= 2020 Women's U19 Volleyball European Championship Qualification =

English

This article describes the qualification for the 2020 Women's U19 Volleyball European Championship.

The qualifying stage for the final tournament was cancelled due to the COVID-19 pandemic by the CEV on 15 June 2020. The tournament itself will be held with participants determined from European Ranking after the respective National Federations confirm their participation in the event.

== Pools composition ==
The second round organisers were drawn and then the pools were set accordingly, following the Serpentine system according to their European Ranking for national teams as of June 2019. Rankings are shown in brackets.

=== First round ===
Pool 1
Sweden (30)
Israel (31)
Montenegro (34)
Kosovo (34)

=== Second round ===
| Pool A | Pool B | Pool C | Pool D | Pool E | Pool F | Pool G |
|---|---|---|---|---|---|---|
| Italy (2) | Serbia (3) | Germany (5) | Slovakia (6) | Poland (10) | Finland (16) | Romania (18) |
| Netherlands (12) | Belgium (11) | France (9) | Belarus (8) | Bulgaria (7) | Turkey (3) | Russia (1) |
| Slovenia (13) | Hungary (13) | Greece (17) | Czech Republic (17) | Latvia (17) | Norway (21) | Denmark (23) |
| 2nd placed Pool 1 | 1st placed Pool 1 | Austria (23) | Ukraine (23) | Spain (23) | Estonia (23) | Switzerland (23) |

== First round ==
=== Pool 1 ===
| Pos | Team | Pld | W | L | Pts | SW | SL | SR | SPW | SPL | SPR | Qualification |
|---|---|---|---|---|---|---|---|---|---|---|---|---|
| 1 | Montenegro | 3 | 3 | 0 | 9 | 9 | 1 | 9.000 | 245 | 182 | 1.346 | Second round |
| 2 | Israel | 3 | 2 | 1 | 6 | 6 | 3 | 2.000 | 206 | 175 | 1.177 | Second round |
| 3 | Sweden | 3 | 1 | 2 | 3 | 4 | 6 | 0.667 | 198 | 232 | 0.853 | |
| 4 | Kosovo | 3 | 0 | 3 | 0 | 0 | 9 | 0.000 | 166 | 227 | 0.731 | |

| Date | Time | | Score | | Set 1 | Set 2 | Set 3 | Set 4 | Set 5 | Total | Report |
|---|---|---|---|---|---|---|---|---|---|---|---|
| 10 Jan | 16:00 | Israel | 3–0 | Sweden | 25–18 | 25–18 | 25–17 | | | 75–53 | Report |
| 10 Jan | 18:30 | Montenegro | 3–0 | Kosovo | 25–17 | 27–25 | 25–14 | | | 77–56 | Report |
| 11 Jan | 16:00 | Sweden | 3–0 | Kosovo | 25–23 | 25–18 | 25–12 | | | 75–53 | Report |
| 11 Jan | 18:30 | Israel | 0–3 | Montenegro | 20–25 | 16–25 | 20–25 | | | 56–75 | Report |
| 12 Jan | 16:00 | Kosovo | 0–3 | Israel | 12–25 | 19–25 | 16–25 | | | 47–75 | Report |
| 12 Jan | 18:30 | Sweden | 1–3 | Montenegro | 25–18 | 16–25 | 17–25 | 12–25 | | 70–93 | Report |

== Second round ==
=== Pool A ===
| Pos | Team | Pld | W | L | Pts | SW | SL | SR | SPW | SPL | SPR | Qualification |
|---|---|---|---|---|---|---|---|---|---|---|---|---|
| 1 | Italy | 0 | 0 | 0 | 0 | 0 | 0 | — | 0 | 0 | — | 2020 European Championship |
| 2 | Netherlands | 0 | 0 | 0 | 0 | 0 | 0 | — | 0 | 0 | — | Third round |
| 3 | Slovenia | 0 | 0 | 0 | 0 | 0 | 0 | — | 0 | 0 | — | |
| 4 | Israel | 0 | 0 | 0 | 0 | 0 | 0 | — | 0 | 0 | — | |

| Date | Time | | Score | | Set 1 | Set 2 | Set 3 | Set 4 | Set 5 | Total | Report |
|---|---|---|---|---|---|---|---|---|---|---|---|
| 24 Apr | 17:00 | Slovenia | – | Netherlands | – | – | – | | | 0–0 | Report |
| 24 Apr | 20:00 | Italy | – | Israel | – | – | – | | | 0–0 | Report |
| 25 Apr | 17:00 | Netherlands | – | Israel | – | – | – | | | 0–0 | Report |
| 25 Apr | 20:00 | Slovenia | – | Italy | – | – | – | | | 0–0 | Report |
| 26 Apr | 17:00 | Israel | – | Slovenia | – | – | – | | | 0–0 | Report |
| 26 Apr | 20:00 | Netherlands | – | Italy | – | – | – | | | 0–0 | Report |

=== Pool B ===
| Pos | Team | Pld | W | L | Pts | SW | SL | SR | SPW | SPL | SPR | Qualification |
|---|---|---|---|---|---|---|---|---|---|---|---|---|
| 1 | Serbia | 0 | 0 | 0 | 0 | 0 | 0 | — | 0 | 0 | — | 2020 European Championship |
| 2 | Belgium | 0 | 0 | 0 | 0 | 0 | 0 | — | 0 | 0 | — | Third round |
| 3 | Hungary | 0 | 0 | 0 | 0 | 0 | 0 | — | 0 | 0 | — | |
| 4 | Montenegro | 0 | 0 | 0 | 0 | 0 | 0 | — | 0 | 0 | — | |

| Date | Time | | Score | | Set 1 | Set 2 | Set 3 | Set 4 | Set 5 | Total | Report |
|---|---|---|---|---|---|---|---|---|---|---|---|
| 30 Apr | 16:30 | Hungary | – | Belgium | – | – | – | | | 0–0 | Report |
| 30 Apr | 19:00 | Serbia | – | Montenegro | – | – | – | | | 0–0 | Report |
| 1 May | 16:30 | Belgium | – | Montenegro | – | – | – | | | 0–0 | Report |
| 1 May | 19:00 | Hungary | – | Serbia | – | – | – | | | 0–0 | Report |
| 2 May | 16:30 | Montenegro | – | Hungary | – | – | – | | | 0–0 | Report |
| 2 May | 19:00 | Belgium | – | Serbia | – | – | – | | | 0–0 | Report |

=== Pool C ===
| Pos | Team | Pld | W | L | Pts | SW | SL | SR | SPW | SPL | SPR | Qualification |
|---|---|---|---|---|---|---|---|---|---|---|---|---|
| 1 | Germany | 0 | 0 | 0 | 0 | 0 | 0 | — | 0 | 0 | — | 2020 European Championship |
| 2 | France | 0 | 0 | 0 | 0 | 0 | 0 | — | 0 | 0 | — | Third round |
| 3 | Greece | 0 | 0 | 0 | 0 | 0 | 0 | — | 0 | 0 | — | |
| 4 | Austria | 0 | 0 | 0 | 0 | 0 | 0 | — | 0 | 0 | — | |

| Date | Time | | Score | | Set 1 | Set 2 | Set 3 | Set 4 | Set 5 | Total | Report |
|---|---|---|---|---|---|---|---|---|---|---|---|
| 24 Apr | 15:00 | Austria | – | France | – | – | – | | | 0–0 | Report |
| 24 Apr | 17:30 | Germany | – | Greece | – | – | – | | | 0–0 | Report |
| 25 Apr | 15:00 | France | – | Greece | – | – | – | | | 0–0 | Report |
| 25 Apr | 17:30 | Austria | – | Germany | – | – | – | | | 0–0 | Report |
| 26 Apr | 15:00 | Greece | – | Austria | – | – | – | | | 0–0 | Report |
| 26 Apr | 17:30 | France | – | Germany | – | – | – | | | 0–0 | Report |

=== Pool D ===
| Pos | Team | Pld | W | L | Pts | SW | SL | SR | SPW | SPL | SPR | Qualification |
|---|---|---|---|---|---|---|---|---|---|---|---|---|
| 1 | Slovakia | 0 | 0 | 0 | 0 | 0 | 0 | — | 0 | 0 | — | 2020 European Championship |
| 2 | Belarus | 0 | 0 | 0 | 0 | 0 | 0 | — | 0 | 0 | — | Third round |
| 3 | Czech Republic | 0 | 0 | 0 | 0 | 0 | 0 | — | 0 | 0 | — | |
| 4 | Ukraine | 0 | 0 | 0 | 0 | 0 | 0 | — | 0 | 0 | — | |

| Date | Time | | Score | | Set 1 | Set 2 | Set 3 | Set 4 | Set 5 | Total | Report |
|---|---|---|---|---|---|---|---|---|---|---|---|
| 23 Apr | 15:30 | Belarus | – | Czech Republic | – | – | – | | | 0–0 | Report |
| 23 Apr | 18:00 | Slovakia | – | Ukraine | – | – | – | | | 0–0 | Report |
| 24 Apr | 15:30 | Czech Republic | – | Ukraine | – | – | – | | | 0–0 | Report |
| 24 Apr | 18:00 | Belarus | – | Slovakia | – | – | – | | | 0–0 | Report |
| 25 Apr | 15:30 | Ukraine | – | Belarus | – | – | – | | | 0–0 | Report |
| 25 Apr | 18:00 | Czech Republic | – | Slovakia | – | – | – | | | 0–0 | Report |

=== Pool E ===
| Pos | Team | Pld | W | L | Pts | SW | SL | SR | SPW | SPL | SPR | Qualification |
|---|---|---|---|---|---|---|---|---|---|---|---|---|
| 1 | Poland | 0 | 0 | 0 | 0 | 0 | 0 | — | 0 | 0 | — | 2020 European Championship |
| 2 | Bulgaria | 0 | 0 | 0 | 0 | 0 | 0 | — | 0 | 0 | — | Third round |
| 3 | Latvia | 0 | 0 | 0 | 0 | 0 | 0 | — | 0 | 0 | — | |
| 4 | Spain | 0 | 0 | 0 | 0 | 0 | 0 | — | 0 | 0 | — | |

| Date | Time | | Score | | Set 1 | Set 2 | Set 3 | Set 4 | Set 5 | Total | Report |
|---|---|---|---|---|---|---|---|---|---|---|---|
| 24 Apr | 16:00 | Bulgaria | – | Spain | – | – | – | | | 0–0 | Report |
| 24 Apr | 18:30 | Latvia | – | Poland | – | – | – | | | 0–0 | Report |
| 25 Apr | 16:00 | Spain | – | Poland | – | – | – | | | 0–0 | Report |
| 25 Apr | 18:30 | Bulgaria | – | Latvia | – | – | – | | | 0–0 | Report |
| 26 Apr | 16:00 | Poland | – | Bulgaria | – | – | – | | | 0–0 | Report |
| 26 Apr | 18:30 | Spain | – | Latvia | – | – | – | | | 0–0 | Report |

=== Pool F ===
| Pos | Team | Pld | W | L | Pts | SW | SL | SR | SPW | SPL | SPR | Qualification |
|---|---|---|---|---|---|---|---|---|---|---|---|---|
| 1 | Finland | 0 | 0 | 0 | 0 | 0 | 0 | — | 0 | 0 | — | 2020 European Championship |
| 2 | Turkey | 0 | 0 | 0 | 0 | 0 | 0 | — | 0 | 0 | — | Third round |
| 3 | Norway | 0 | 0 | 0 | 0 | 0 | 0 | — | 0 | 0 | — | |
| 4 | Estonia | 0 | 0 | 0 | 0 | 0 | 0 | — | 0 | 0 | — | |

| Date | Time | | Score | | Set 1 | Set 2 | Set 3 | Set 4 | Set 5 | Total | Report |
|---|---|---|---|---|---|---|---|---|---|---|---|
| 1 May | 16:30 | Norway | – | Estonia | – | – | – | | | 0–0 | Report |
| 1 May | 19:00 | Finland | – | Turkey | – | – | – | | | 0–0 | Report |
| 2 May | 15:00 | Estonia | – | Turkey | – | – | – | | | 0–0 | Report |
| 2 May | 17:30 | Norway | – | Finland | – | – | – | | | 0–0 | Report |
| 3 May | 15:00 | Turkey | – | Norway | – | – | – | | | 0–0 | Report |
| 3 May | 17:30 | Estonia | – | Finland | – | – | – | | | 0–0 | Report |

=== Pool G ===
| Pos | Team | Pld | W | L | Pts | SW | SL | SR | SPW | SPL | SPR | Qualification |
|---|---|---|---|---|---|---|---|---|---|---|---|---|
| 1 | Romania | 0 | 0 | 0 | 0 | 0 | 0 | — | 0 | 0 | — | 2020 European Championship |
| 2 | Russia | 0 | 0 | 0 | 0 | 0 | 0 | — | 0 | 0 | — | Third round |
| 3 | Denmark | 0 | 0 | 0 | 0 | 0 | 0 | — | 0 | 0 | — | |
| 4 | Switzerland | 0 | 0 | 0 | 0 | 0 | 0 | — | 0 | 0 | — | |

| Date | Time | | Score | | Set 1 | Set 2 | Set 3 | Set 4 | Set 5 | Total | Report |
|---|---|---|---|---|---|---|---|---|---|---|---|
| 23 Apr | 20:00 | Denmark | – | Romania | – | – | – | | | 0–0 | Report |
| 24 Apr | 15:00 | Russia | – | Denmark | – | – | – | | | 0–0 | Report |
| 24 Apr | 17:30 | Romania | – | Switzerland | – | – | – | | | 0–0 | Report |
| 25 Apr | 15:00 | Switzerland | – | Russia | – | – | – | | | 0–0 | Report |
| 26 Apr | 15:00 | Switzerland | – | Denmark | – | – | – | | | 0–0 | Report |
| 26 Apr | 17:30 | Romania | – | Russia | – | – | – | | | 0–0 | Report |
