= 2022 Women's U21 European Volleyball Championship Qualification =

English

This article describes the qualification for the 2022 Women's U21 European Volleyball Championship.

== Pools composition ==
The qualification round organizers were drawn and then the pools were set accordingly, following the Serpentine system according to their European Ranking for U19 national teams as of December 2020. Rankings are shown in brackets. The CEV later excluded Belarus and Russia from European competitions in March 2022. Pool C tournament will be not held, Hungary was moved to Pool B.

Pool A	Pool B	Pool C	Pool D	Pool E
Serbia (2)	Poland (3)	~~Belarus (4)~~	Austria (24)	Montenegro (30)
Denmark (19)	Czech Republic (19)	~~Russia (9)~~	Bulgaria (5)	Turkey (1)
Latvia (19)	Ukraine (24)	~~Hungary (24)~~	Israel (31)	Portugal (33)
	Hungary (24)		Faroe Islands (NP)	Iceland (35)

== Qualification round ==
=== Pool A ===
Pos	Team	Pld	W	L	Pts	SW	SL	SR	SPW	SPL	SPR	Qualification
1	Serbia	2	2	0	6	6	0	MAX	150	89	1.685	2022 European Championship
2	Denmark	2	1	1	3	3	4	0.750	149	154	0.968	2022 European Championship
3	Latvia	2	0	2	0	1	6	0.167	118	174	0.678	

Date	Time		Score		Set 1	Set 2	Set 3	Set 4	Set 5	Total	Report
19 May	18:00	Denmark	0–3	Serbia	14–25	15–25	21–25			50–75	Report
20 May	18:00	Latvia	1–3	Denmark	26–24	16–25	22–25	15–25		79–99	Report
21 May	18:00	Serbia	3–0	Latvia	25–13	25–8	25–18			75–39	Report

=== Pool B ===
Pos	Team	Pld	W	L	Pts	SW	SL	SR	SPW	SPL	SPR	Qualification
1	Poland	3	3	0	9	9	1	9.000	241	174	1.385	2022 European Championship
2	Ukraine	3	2	1	5	7	6	1.167	270	283	0.954	2022 European Championship
3	Czech Republic	3	1	2	4	5	6	0.833	235	236	0.996	
4	Hungary	3	0	3	0	1	9	0.111	192	245	0.784	

Date	Time		Score		Set 1	Set 2	Set 3	Set 4	Set 5	Total	Report
19 May	16:00	Hungary	1–3	Ukraine	15–25	25–20	23–25	23–25		86–95	Report
19 May	19:00	Poland	3–0	Czech Republic	25–22	25–18	25–14			75–54	Report
20 May	16:00	Ukraine	3–2	Czech Republic	15–25	25–22	18–25	25–21	15–13	98–106	Report
20 May	19:00	Hungary	0–3	Poland	18–25	13–25	12–25			43–75	Report
21 May	16:00	Czech Republic	3–0	Hungary	25–19	25–22	25–22			75–63	Report
21 May	19:00	Ukraine	1–3	Poland	25–16	13–25	19–25	20–25		77–91	Report

=== Pool C ===
Tournament cancelled due to expulsion of Belarus and Russia from European competitions.

=== Pool D ===
Pos	Team	Pld	W	L	Pts	SW	SL	SR	SPW	SPL	SPR	Qualification
1	Austria	3	3	0	9	9	1	9.000	240	174	1.379	2022 European Championship
2	Israel	3	2	1	6	7	3	2.333	223	193	1.155	2022 European Championship
3	Bulgaria	3	1	2	3	3	6	0.500	203	201	1.010	
4	Faroe Islands	3	0	3	0	0	9	0.000	127	225	0.564	

Date	Time		Score		Set 1	Set 2	Set 3	Set 4	Set 5	Total	Report
19 May	16:00	Faroe Islands	0–3	Austria	7–25	17–25	10–25			34–75	Report
19 May	18:30	Bulgaria	0–3	Israel	24–26	14–25	22–25			60–76	Report
20 May	16:00	Austria	3–1	Israel	11–25	25–12	25–22	25–13		86–72	Report
20 May	18:30	Faroe Islands	0–3	Bulgaria	13–25	23–25	10–25			46–75	Report
21 May	16:00	Austria	3–0	Bulgaria	25–23	29–27	25–18			79–68	Report
21 May	18:30	Israel	3–0	Faroe Islands	25–15	25–14	25–18			75–47	Report

=== Pool E ===
Pos	Team	Pld	W	L	Pts	SW	SL	SR	SPW	SPL	SPR	Qualification
1	Turkey	3	3	0	9	9	0	MAX	226	159	1.421	2022 European Championship
2	Portugal	3	2	1	5	6	5	1.200	244	227	1.075	
3	Montenegro	3	1	2	4	5	6	0.833	229	240	0.954	
4	Iceland	3	0	3	0	0	9	0.000	153	226	0.677	

Date	Time		Score		Set 1	Set 2	Set 3	Set 4	Set 5	Total	Report
19 May	17:00	Portugal	0–3	Turkey	21–25	19–25	24–26			64–76	Report
19 May	20:00	Montenegro	3–0	Iceland	25–17	25–22	25–22			75–61	Report
20 May	17:00	Turkey	3–0	Iceland	25–13	25–23	25–9			75–45	Report
20 May	20:00	Portugal	3–2	Montenegro	16–25	25–17	22–25	26–24	15–13	104–104	Report
21 May	17:00	Iceland	0–3	Portugal	14–25	9–25	24–26			47–76	Report
21 May	20:00	Turkey	3–0	Montenegro	25–14	25–20	25–16			75–50	Report

=== Ranking of the second placed teams ===
- Matches against the fourth placed team in each pool are not included in this ranking. Originally there would have been a fifth second-placed team until Belarus and Russia were disqualified.

Pos	Team	Pld	W	L	Pts	SW	SL	SR	SPW	SPL	SPR	Qualification
1	Israel	2	1	1	3	4	3	1.333	148	146	1.014	2022 European Championship
2	Denmark	2	1	1	3	3	4	0.750	149	154	0.968	2022 European Championship
3	Ukraine	2	1	1	2	4	5	0.800	175	197	0.888	2022 European Championship
4	Portugal	2	1	1	2	3	5	0.600	168	180	0.933	
