= Switzerland women's national under-21 volleyball team =

Switzerland U20
- Association: Swiss Volleyball Federation
- Confederation: CEV

Uniforms
Home	Away	Third

FIVB U21 World Championship
- Appearances: No Appearances

Europe U19 Championship
- Appearances: 5 (First in 1973)
- Best result: 9th place : (2000)
- www.volleyball.ch/ (in German)

The Switzerland women's national under-20 volleyball team represents Switzerland in international women's volleyball competitions and friendly matches under the age 20 and it is ruled by the Swiss Volleyball Federation That is an affiliate of Federation of International Volleyball FIVB and also a part of European Volleyball Confederation CEV.

== Results ==
=== FIVB U21 World Championship ===
Champions Runners up Third place Fourth place

FIVB U21 World Championship
Year	Round	Position	Pld	W	L	SW	SL	Squad
(Brazil) → 1977	Didn't qualify							
(Belgium) (Netherlands) ← 2021	Didn't qualify							
Total	0 Titles	0/21						

=== Europe Junior Championship ===
Champions Runners up Third place Fourth place

Europe Junior Championship
Year	Round	Position	Pld	W	L	SW	SL	Squad
(Hungary) → 1966	Didn't qualify							
(Italy) ← 1971	Didn't qualify							
(Netherlands) 1973		15th place						Squad
(West Germany) → 1975	Didn't qualify							
(Austria) ← 1990	Didn't qualify							
(Greece) 1992		12th place						Squad
(Hungary) → 1994	Didn't qualify							
(Belgium) ← 1998	Didn't qualify							
(Switzerland) 2000		9th place						Squad
(Croatia) 2002	Didn't qualify							
(Slovakia) 2004		12th place						Squad
(France) → 2006	Didn't qualify							
(Bosnia and Herzegovina) (Croatia) ← 2020	Didn't qualify							
(North Macedonia) 2022		11th place						Squad
Total	0 title	5/28						

== Team ==
=== Current squad ===
The Following players is the Swiss players that Competed in the 2018 Women's U19 Volleyball European Championship

#	name	position	height	weight	birthday	spike	block
1	kressler zoë	setter	181	67	2000	297	285
2	smiljkovic adrijana	setter	188	70	2001	284	269
3	balestra chiara	setter	167	60	2001	260	250
4	maeder annalea	setter	187	57	2002	284	271
5	portmann noemi	libero	165	59	2001	258	249
6	habegger viviane	libero	172	61	2001	266	255
7	duss marie-malene	opposite	177	65	2001	293	282
8	petitat chiara	outside-spiker	180	79	2000	298	288
9	suriano elisa	opposite	178	73	2001	286	275
10	blagojevic anja	outside-spiker	184	66	2001	292	277
11	fiechter jasmine	outside-spiker	179	67	2000	295	284
12	schwörer anika	opposite	180	78	2001	298	285
13	majic amanda	opposite	179	67	2000	282	273
14	merminod thanaë	outside-spiker	181	80	2001	295	283
15	riesen tamara	opposite	178	66	2000	282	273
16	zurlinden lea	middle-blocker	176	70	2001	285	275
17	branca fabiana	middle-blocker	182	80	2000	298	286
18	wirz jeanina	middle-blocker	190	67	2000	286	275
19	florin janina	middle-blocker	184	66	2000	290	279
20	dovhopola polina	middle-blocker	184	65	2001	293	278
21	riner laraine	middle-blocker	192	71	2000	288	277
