= Denmark women's national under-21 volleyball team =

Denmark U20
- Association: Danish Volleyball Federation
- Confederation: CEV

Uniforms
Home	Away	Third

FIVB U21 World Championship
- Appearances: No Appearances

Europe U19 Championship
- Appearances: 1 (First in 1973)
- Best result: 17th place : (1973)

The Denmark women's national under-20 volleyball team represents Denmark in international women's volleyball competitions and friendly matches under the age 20 and it is ruled by the Danish Volleyball Federation That is an affiliate of Federation of International Volleyball FIVB and also a part of European Volleyball Confederation CEV.

== Results ==
=== FIVB U20 World Championship ===
Champions Runners up Third place Fourth place

FIVB U20 World Championship
Year	Round	Position	Pld	W	L	SW	SL	Squad
(Brazil) 1977 To | (Belgium) (Netherlands) 2021	Didn't qualify							
Total	0 Titles	0/21						

=== Europe U19 Championship ===
Champions Runners up Third place Fourth place

Europe U19 Championship
Year	Round	Position	Pld	W	L	SW	SL	Squad
(Hungary) 1966	Didn't qualify							
(Soviet Union) 1969	Didn't qualify							
(Italy) 1971	Didn't qualify							
(Netherlands) 1973		17th place						Squad
(West Germany) 1975	Didn't Qualify							
(Socialist Federal Republic of Yugoslavia) 1977	Didn't Qualify							
(Spain) 1979	Didn't Qualify							
(West Germany) 1982	Didn't Qualify							
(France) 1984	Didn't Qualify							
(Bulgaria) 1986	Didn't Qualify							
(Italy) 1988	Didn't Qualify							
(Austria) 1990	Didn't Qualify							
(Greece) 1992	Didn't Qualify							
(Hungary) 1994	Didn't Qualify							
(Turkey) 1996	Didn't Qualify							
(Belgium) 1998	Didn't Qualify							

Europe U19 Championship
Year	Round	Position	Pld	W	L	SW	SL	Squad
(Switzerland) 2000	Didn't Qualify							
(Croatia) 2002	Didn't Qualify							
(Slovakia) 2004	Didn't Qualify							
(France) 2006	Didn't Qualify							
(Italy) 2008	Didn't Qualify							
(Serbia) 2010	Didn't Qualify							
(Turkey) 2012	Didn't Qualify							
(Finland) / (Estonia) 2014	Didn't Qualify							
2016 Q	Group Stages	4th Placed						
2018 Q	Group Stages	Third Placed						
2020 Q	Group Stages	Third Placed						
Total	0 Titles	1/27						

== Team ==
=== Previous squad ===
#	name	position	height	weight	birthday	spike	block
1	NYGAARD Agnes Due	Outside spiker	178	60	2005	287	232
2	BONFILS Laura	Libero	167	60	2005	270	210
3	CHRISTENSEN Nicole Grønbæk	Libero	170	60	2005	278	220
4	CLAUSEN Nikita Maria Egemark	Middle blocker	180	60	2005	285	225
5	LYØ Frida Meincke	Outside spiker	174	60	2004	297	224
7	SØRENSEN Sarah Karoline Boe	Middle blocker	179	60	2004	288	233
8	LAJER Ingrid Stenkil	Middle blocker	187	60	2004	296	237
9	KROGH Caroline Stenholt	Outside spiker	183	60	2004	284	228
10	HERSKIND Ida Linné	Outside spiker	178	60	2004	286	231
11	KRISTENSEN Frida Pfeiffer	Middle blocker	181	60	2004	283	228
13	LAURIDSEN Pippi Sofia Linnemann	Outside spiker	184	60	2005	300	238
14	CHRISTENSEN Rikke Louise Glargaard	Setter	166	60	2004	276	222
16	NIELSEN Emma Gylling	Opposite	187	60	2004	304	245
17	OVERGAARD Mathilde Rolighed Brinck	Outside spiker	190	60	2004	305	245
17	RASMUSSEN Sofia Herman	Middle blocker	179	60	2005	281	228
18	RIIS Linnea	Libero	158	60	2005	254	216
19	FISKER Frida	Outside spiker	177	65	2004	280	232
20	CHRISTENSEN Clara Therese	Setter	174	58	2005	276	218
21	BERTELSEN Sarah Struwe	Outside spiker	170	60	2004	280	225
22	LAU Ida Damsgaard	Outside spiker	172	60	2004	286	221
23	KJÆRSGAARD Katrine	Libero	166	60	2004	254	216
24	JEPPESEN Alberte Borup	Libero	178	60	2005	283	226
25	DOGAN Elif	Outside spiker	175	60	2005	290	224
