= Belgium women's national under-21 volleyball team =

Belgium U20
- Association: Koninklijk Belgisch Volleybalverbond (KBVBV)
- Confederation: CEV

Uniforms
| Home | Away | Third |

FIVB U21 World Championship
- Appearances: 1 (First in 2011)
- Best result: 8th place : (2011)

CEV Europe U19 Championship
- Appearances: 12 (First in 1969)
- Best result: 4th place : (1998 2016)
- Top Volley Belgium

The Belgium women's national under-20 volleyball team represents Belgium in international women's volleyball competitions and friendly matches under the age 20 and it is ruled and managed by the Belgium Royal Volleyball Federation That is an affiliate of International Volleyball Federation FIVB and also a part of European Volleyball Confederation CEV.

== Results ==
=== FIVB U20 World Championship ===
Champions Runners up Third place Fourth place

FIVB U20 World Championship
| Year | Round | Position | Pld | W | L | SW | SL | Squad |
|---|---|---|---|---|---|---|---|---|
| (Brazil) 1977 | Didn't compete | | | | | | | |
| (Mexico) 1981 | Didn't qualify | | | | | | | |
| (Italy) 1985 | Didn't qualify | | | | | | | |
| (South Korea) 1987 | Didn't qualify | | | | | | | |
| (Peru) 1989 | Didn't qualify | | | | | | | |
| (Czechoslovakia) 1991 | Didn't qualify | | | | | | | |
| (Brazil) 1993 | Didn't qualify | | | | | | | |
| (Thailand) 1995 | Didn't qualify | | | | | | | |
| (Poland) 1997 | Didn't qualify | | | | | | | |
| (Canada) 1999 | Didn't qualify | | | | | | | |
| (Dominican Republic) 2001 | Didn't qualify | | | | | | | |
| (Thailand) 2003 | Didn't qualify | | | | | | | |
| (Turkey) 2005 | Didn't qualify | | | | | | | |
| (Thailand) 2007 | Didn't qualify | | | | | | | |
| (Mexico) 2009 | Didn't qualify | | | | | | | |
| (Peru) 2011 | | 8th place | | | | | | Squad |
| (Czech Republic) 2013 | Didn't qualify | | | | | | | |
| (Puerto Rico) 2015 | Didn't qualify | | | | | | | |
| (Mexico) 2017 | Didn't qualify | | | | | | | |
| (Mexico) 2019 | Didn't qualify | | | | | | | |
| (Belgium) (Netherlands) 2021 | | 13th place | | | | | | Squad |
| Total | 0 Titles | 2/19 | | | | | | |

=== Europe U19 Championship ===
Champions Runners up Third place Fourth place

Europe U19 Championship
| Year | Round | Position | Pld | W | L | SW | SL | Squad |
|---|---|---|---|---|---|---|---|---|
| (Hungary) 1966 | Didn't compete | | | | | | | |
| (Soviet Union) 1969 | | 12th place | | | | | | Squad |
| (Italy) 1971 | Didn't qualify | | | | | | | |
| (Netherlands) 1973 | | 12th place | | | | | | Squad |
| (West Germany) 1975 | | 11th place | | | | | | Squad |
| (Socialist Federal Republic of Yugoslavia) 1977 | Didn't qualify | | | | | | | |
| (Spain) 1979 | Didn't qualify | | | | | | | |
| (West Germany) 1982 | Didn't qualify | | | | | | | |
| (France) 1984 | | 10th place | | | | | | Squad |
| (Bulgaria) 1986 | Didn't qualify | | | | | | | |
| (Italy) 1988 | Didn't qualify | | | | | | | |
| (Austria) 1990 | Didn't qualify | | | | | | | |
| (Greece) 1992 | Didn't qualify | | | | | | | |
| (Hungary) 1994 | Didn't qualify | | | | | | | |
| (Turkey) 1996 | Didn't qualify | | | | | | | |
| (Belgium) 1998 | | 4th place | | | | | | Squad |

Europe U19 Championship
| Year | Round | Position | Pld | W | L | SW | SL | Squad |
|---|---|---|---|---|---|---|---|---|
| (Switzerland) 2000 | | 11th place | | | | | | Squad |
| (Croatia) 2002 | Didn't qualify | | | | | | | |
| (Slovakia) 2004 | Didn't qualify | | | | | | | |
| (France) 2006 | | 8th place | | | | | | Squad |
| (Italy) 2008 | | 7th place | | | | | | Squad |
| (Serbia) 2010 | | 11th place | | | | | | Squad |
| (Turkey) 2012 | | 8th place | | | | | | Squad |
| (Finland) / (Estonia) 2014 | | 8th place | | | | | | Squad |
| (Hungary) / (Slovakia) 2016 | | 4th place | | | | | | Squad |
| (Albania) 2018 | Didn't qualify | | | | | | | |
| Total | 0 Titles | 12/26 | | | | | | |

== Team ==
=== Current squad ===
The Following list include Belgium women's under-20 team.

- Head coach : (Belgium) Callens Fien

| Name | Date of birth | Height | Current club |
|---|---|---|---|
| Coppin Charlotte | 1 December 1998 | 1.86 m (6 ft 1 in) | (Belgium) Asterix Kieldrecht |
| De Donder Sara | 11 February 2000 | 1.75 m (5 ft 9 in) | (Belgium) TSV Vilvoorde |
| De Quick Lotte | 11 January 1998 | 1.72 m (5 ft 8 in) | (Belgium) VDK Gent Dames |
| Moulin Oriane | 18 February 2000 | 1.81 m (5 ft 11 in) | (Belgium) Tchalou |
| Coppens Hanne | 7 May 1998 | 1.84 m (6 ft 0 in) | (Belgium) Asterix Kieldrecht |
| Kindi Bieke | 11 February 2000 | 1.91 m (6 ft 3 in) | (Belgium) TSV Vilvoorde |
| Peeters Elien | 26 April 1999 | 1.82 m (6 ft 0 in) | (Belgium) TSV Vilvoorde |
| Van Avermaet Silke | 6 February 1999 | 1.92 m (6 ft 4 in) | (Belgium) Asterix Kieldrecht |
| Verlinden Marie-Hélène | 6 February 1999 | 1.86 m (6 ft 1 in) | (Belgium) TSV Vilvoorde |
| Claes Laura | 31 March 1998 | 1.80 m (5 ft 11 in) | (Belgium) Datovoc Tongeren |
| De Paepe Nikita | 22 February 2001 | 1.82 m (6 ft 0 in) | (Belgium) TSV Vilvoorde |
| De Sloover Manon | 22 November 1999 | 1.81 m (5 ft 11 in) | (Belgium) TSV Vilvoorde |
| Devos Janne | 25 May 1999 | 1.79 m (5 ft 10 in) | (Belgium) TSV Vilvoorde |
| D’hondt Justine | 8 July 1999 | 1.78 m (5 ft 10 in) | (Belgium) TSV Vilvoorde |
| Flament Laure | 18 June 1998 | 1.82 m (6 ft 0 in) | (Belgium) TSV Vilvoorde |
| Herbots Britt | 24 September 1999 | 1.82 m (6 ft 0 in) | (Belgium) Asterix Kieldrecht |
| Maertens Louka | 11 January 2000 | 1.83 m (6 ft 0 in) | (Belgium) TSV Vilvoorde |
| Stragiers Manon | 12 March 1999 | 1.83 m (6 ft 0 in) | (Belgium) Asterix Kieldrecht |
| Vanassche Felice | 28 July 2000 | 1.83 m (6 ft 0 in) | (Belgium) TSV Vilvoorde |
| Vleminckx Yasmine | 24 January 1999 | 1.83 m (6 ft 0 in) | (Belgium) TSV Vilvoorde |
| De Tant Amber | 22 March 1998 | 1.77 m (5 ft 10 in) | (Belgium) Asterix Kieldrecht |
| Goossens Sofie | 22 October 2001 | 1.74 m (5 ft 9 in) | (Belgium) TSV Vilvoorde |
| Rampelberg Britt | 5 June 2000 | 1.63 m (5 ft 4 in) | (Belgium) TSV Vilvoorde |
| Valkenborg Anna | 4 January 1998 | 1.74 m (5 ft 9 in) | (Belgium) Asterix Kieldrecht |
