= 2022 Women's U21 European Volleyball Championship =

Tournament details
- Host country: Italy
- Dates: 12–17 July 2022
- Teams: 8
- Venues: 2 (in 2 host cities)

Final positions
- Champions: Italy (1st title)

Tournament awards
- MVP: (Italy) Emma Cagnin

Tournament statistics
- Matches played: 16
- Attendance: 5,245 (328 per match)

The 2022 Women's U21 European Volleyball Championship was the inaugural edition of the Women's U21 European Volleyball Championship, a biennial international volleyball tournament organized by the European Volleyball Confederation (CEV). The tournament was held in Italy (host cities Cerignola and Andria) from 12 to 17 July 2022.

== Qualification ==
Means of qualification		Qualifier
Host country		Italy
Qualification round	Pool A	Serbia
Qualification round	Pool B	Poland
Qualification round	~~Pool C~~	Tournament cancelled
Qualification round	Pool D	Austria
Qualification round	Pool E	Turkey
Qualification round	Best runner ups	Israel
Qualification round	Best runner ups	Denmark
Qualification round	Best runner ups	Ukraine

== Pools composition ==
The drawing of lots was combined with a seeding of National Federations and performed as follows:

1. Organiser, Italy, were seeded in Pool I
2. The highest ranked participating team from the CEV European Ranking, Turkey, were seeded in Pool II
3. Remaining 6 participating teams drawn after they were previously placed in three cups as per their position in the latest European Ranking for U19 national teams

Pot 1	Pot 2	Pot 3
Serbia; Poland	Denmark; Austria	Ukraine; Israel

Result

The drawing of lots was held on 1 June 2022.

Pool I	Pool II
Italy	Turkey
Serbia	Poland
Austria	Denmark
Ukraine	Israel

== Venues ==
Pool I, Final round		Pool II	
Cerignola, Italy	Cerignola is located in Italy	Andria, Italy	Andria is located in Italy
Pala Tatarella	Cerignola is located in Italy	Pala Sport	Andria is located in Italy
Capacity: ?	Cerignola is located in Italy	Capacity: ?	Andria is located in Italy

== Preliminary round ==
=== Pool I ===
Pos	Team	Pld	W	L	Pts	SW	SL	SR	SPW	SPL	SPR	Qualification
1	Italy	3	3	0	8	9	3	3.000	280	225	1.244	Semifinals
2	Serbia	3	2	1	7	8	3	2.667	253	198	1.278	Semifinals
3	Ukraine	3	1	2	3	4	7	0.571	228	242	0.942	
4	Austria	3	0	3	0	1	9	0.111	150	246	0.610	

Date	Time		Score		Set 1	Set 2	Set 3	Set 4	Set 5	Total	Report
12 Jul	17:30	Austria	0–3	Serbia	10–25	11–25	18–25			39–75	Report
12 Jul	20:00	Italy	3–1	Ukraine	25–22	23–25	25–14	25–19		98–80	Report
13 Jul	17:30	Serbia	3–0	Ukraine	25–17	25–18	25–17			75–52	Report
13 Jul	20:00	Austria	0–3	Italy	9–25	14–25	19–25			42–75	Report
14 Jul	17:30	Ukraine	3–1	Austria	25–18	21–25	25–15	25–11		96–69	Report
14 Jul	20:00	Serbia	2–3	Italy	25–23	25–13	17–25	17–25	19–21	103–107	Report

=== Pool II ===
Pos	Team	Pld	W	L	Pts	SW	SL	SR	SPW	SPL	SPR	Qualification
1	Poland	3	3	0	9	9	0	MAX	225	175	1.286	Semifinals
2	Turkey	3	2	1	6	6	4	1.500	237	199	1.191	Semifinals
3	Denmark	3	1	2	3	3	6	0.500	174	210	0.829	
4	Israel	3	0	3	0	1	9	0.111	197	249	0.791	

Date	Time		Score		Set 1	Set 2	Set 3	Set 4	Set 5	Total	Report
12 Jul	17:30	Poland	3–0	Denmark	25–16	25–21	25–12			75–49	Report
12 Jul	20:00	Turkey	3–1	Israel	24–26	25–17	25–11	25–20		99–74	Report
13 Jul	17:30	Denmark	3–0	Israel	25–23	25–16	25–21			75–60	Report
13 Jul	20:00	Poland	3–0	Turkey	25–22	25–21	25–20			75–63	Report
14 Jul	17:30	Denmark	0–3	Turkey	12–25	16–25	22–25			50–75	Report
14 Jul	20:00	Israel	0–3	Poland	22–25	23–25	18–25			63–75	Report

== Final round ==
Semifinals
16 July
Italy	3
Turkey	2
16 July
Poland	0
Serbia	3

Final
17 July
Italy	3
Serbia	2
3rd place match
17 July
Turkey	3
Poland	2

=== Semifinals ===
Date	Time		Score		Set 1	Set 2	Set 3	Set 4	Set 5	Total	Report
16 Jul	17:30	Poland	0–3	Serbia	21–25	15–25	20–25			56–75	Report
16 Jul	20:00	Italy	3–2	Turkey	23–25	25–17	25–21	17–25	15–12	105–100	Report

=== 3rd place match ===
Date	Time		Score		Set 1	Set 2	Set 3	Set 4	Set 5	Total	Report
17 Jul	17:30	Turkey	3–2	Poland	21–25	25–23	26–28	25–21	15–10	112–107	Report

=== Final ===
Date	Time		Score		Set 1	Set 2	Set 3	Set 4	Set 5	Total	Report
17 Jul	20:00	Italy	3–2	Serbia	17–25	25–17	15–25	25–19	15–11	97–97	Report

== Final standing ==
Rank	Team
1st place, gold medalist(s)	Italy
2nd place, silver medalist(s)	Serbia
3rd place, bronze medalist(s)	Turkey
4	Poland
5	Ukraine
6	Denmark
7	Israel
8	Austria

== Awards ==
At the conclusion of the tournament, the following players were selected as the tournament dream team.

- Most valuable player
  (Italy) Emma Cagnin
- Best setter
  (Serbia) Andrea Tišma
- Best outside spikers
  (Serbia) Branka Tica
  (Italy) Loveth Omoruyi
- Best middle blockers
  (Italy) Emma Graziani
  (Serbia) Ana Malešević
- Best opposite spiker
  (Turkey) İpar Özay Kurt
- Best libero
  (Turkey) Gülce Güctekin
