= Netherlands women's national under-21 volleyball team =

The Netherlands U20
- Association: Nederlandse Volleybalbond
- Confederation: CEV

Uniforms
Home	Away	Third

FIVB U21 World Championship
- Appearances: 3 (First in 1995)
- Best result: 4th place : (2003)

CEV Europe U19 Championship
- Appearances: 23 (First in 1966)
- Best result: 4th place : (1994, 2002, 2022)
- www.volleybal.nl (in Dutch)

The Netherlands women's national under-20 volleyball team represents Netherlands in international women's volleyball competitions and friendly matches under the age 20 and it is ruled by the Dutch Volleyball Association That is an affiliate of International Volleyball Federation FIVB and also a part of European Volleyball Confederation CEV.

== Results ==
=== FIVB U20 World Championship ===
Champions Runners up Third place Fourth place

FIVB U20 World Championship
Year	Round	Position	Pld	W	L	SW	SL	Squad
(Brazil) 1977	Did not qualify							
(Mexico) 1981	Did not qualify							
(Italy) 1985	Did not qualify							
(South Korea) 1987	Did not qualify							
(Peru) 1989	Did not qualify							
(Czechoslovakia) 1991	Did not qualify							
(Brazil) 1993	Did not qualify							
(Thailand) 1995		5th place						Squad
(Poland) 1997	Didn't Qualify							
(Canada) 1999	Didn't Qualify							
(Dominican Republic) 2001	Didn't Qualify							
(Thailand) 2003		4th place						Squad
(Turkey) 2005	Didn't Qualify							
(Thailand) 2007	Didn't Qualify							
(Mexico) 2009		6th place						Squad
(Peru) 2011	Didn't Qualify							
(Czech Republic) 2013	Didn't Qualify							
(Puerto Rico) 2015	Didn't Qualify							
(Mexico) 2017	Didn't Qualify							
(Mexico) 2019	Didn't Qualify							
(Belgium) (Netherlands) 2021		4th place						Squad
Total	0 Titles	4/19						

=== Europe U19 Championship ===
Champions Runners up Third place Fourth place

Europe U19 Championship
Year	Round	Position	Pld	W	L	SW	SL	Squad
(Hungary) 1966		9th place						Squad
(Soviet Union) 1969		8th place						Squad
(Italy) 1971		8th place						Squad
(Netherlands) 1973		6th place						Squad
(West Germany) 1975		10th place						Squad
(Socialist Federal Republic of Yugoslavia) 1977		9th place						Squad
(Spain) 1979		8th place						Squad
(West Germany) 1982		6th place						Squad
(France) 1984		6th place						Squad
(Bulgaria) 1986		9th place						Squad
(Italy) 1988		11th place						Squad
(Austria) 1990		11th place						Squad
(Greece) 1992		11th place						Squad
(Hungary) 1994		4th place						Squad
(Turkey) 1996	Didn't qualify							
(Belgium) 1998		8th place						Squad

Europe U19 Championship
Year	Round	Position	Pld	W	L	SW	SL	Squad
(Switzerland) 2000	Didn't qualify							
(Croatia) 2002		4th place						Squad
(Slovakia) 2004		8th place						Squad
(France) 2006		10th place						Squad
(Italy) 2008		11th place						Squad
(Serbia) 2010		9th place						Squad
(Turkey) 2012	Didn't qualify							
(Finland) / (Estonia) 2014		10th place						Squad
(Hungary) / (Slovakia) 2016	Didn't qualify							
(Albania) 2018		7th place						Squad
(Bosnia and Herzegovina) / (Croatia) 2020	Didn't qualify							
(North Macedonia) 2022		4th place						Squad
Total	0 title	23/28						

== Team ==
=== Current squad ===
The following is the Dutch roster in the 2016 European U19 Championship.

Head coach: (Netherlands) Julien Van De Vyver

#	Name	Year of birth	Height	Weight	Spike	Block
1	Haar Charlotte	1999	1.80 m (5 ft 11 in)	68 kg (150 lb)	000 cm (0 in)	000 cm (0 in)
2	Martherus Bo	1998	1.64 m (5 ft 5 in)	54 kg (119 lb)	000 cm (0 in)	000 cm (0 in)
3	Ressink Florien	1998	1.74 m (5 ft 9 in)	59 kg (130 lb)	000 cm (0 in)	000 cm (0 in)
4	Van Aalen Sarah	2000	1.77 m (5 ft 10 in)	63 kg (139 lb)	000 cm (0 in)	000 cm (0 in)
5	Wolt Christie	1998	1.80 m (5 ft 11 in)	64 kg (141 lb)	000 cm (0 in)	000 cm (0 in)
6	Wessels Kirsten	1998	1.85 m (6 ft 1 in)	70 kg (150 lb)	000 cm (0 in)	000 cm (0 in)
7	De Zwart Laura	1999	1.98 m (6 ft 6 in)	76 kg (168 lb)	000 cm (0 in)	000 cm (0 in)
8	Schreurs Britt	1998	1.83 m (6 ft 0 in)	73 kg (161 lb)	000 cm (0 in)	000 cm (0 in)
9	Daalderop Nika	1998	1.88 m (6 ft 2 in)	68 kg (150 lb)	000 cm (0 in)	000 cm (0 in)
10	Timmerman Eline	1998	1.92 m (6 ft 4 in)	78 kg (172 lb)	000 cm (0 in)	000 cm (0 in)
11	Koebrugge Carlijn Sanne	1998	1.89 m (6 ft 2 in)	72 kg (159 lb)	000 cm (0 in)	000 cm (0 in)
12	Scholten Iris	1999	1.91 m (6 ft 3 in)	68 kg (150 lb)	000 cm (0 in)	000 cm (0 in)
13	De Vries Tess	2001	1.85 m (6 ft 1 in)	67 kg (148 lb)	000 cm (0 in)	000 cm (0 in)
14	Boom Dagmar	2000	1.83 m (6 ft 0 in)	69 kg (152 lb)	000 cm (0 in)	000 cm (0 in)
15	Kos Susanne	2000	1.68 m (5 ft 6 in)	55 kg (121 lb)	000 cm (0 in)	000 cm (0 in)
16	Akse Jasmijn	1999	1.87 m (6 ft 2 in)	65 kg (143 lb)	000 cm (0 in)	000 cm (0 in)
17	Geerdink Eline	2000	1.93 m (6 ft 4 in)	68 kg (150 lb)	000 cm (0 in)	000 cm (0 in)
18	Mulder Vera	2000	1.87 m (6 ft 2 in)	68 kg (150 lb)	000 cm (0 in)	000 cm (0 in)
19	Vellener Charlot	2001	1.77 m (5 ft 10 in)	59 kg (130 lb)	000 cm (0 in)	000 cm (0 in)
