= Czech Republic women's national under-21 volleyball team =

Youth volleyball team representing the Czech Republic

Czech Republic U20
- Association: Czech Volleyball Federation
- Confederation: CEV

Uniforms
Home	Away	Third

FIVB U21 World Championship
- Appearances: 6 (First in 1997)
- Best result: 6th Place : (1997)

Europe U19 Championship
- Appearances: 10 (First in 1994)
- Best result: (gold) Champions : (2000)
- www.cvf.cz (in Czech)

The Czech Republic women's national under-20 volleyball team represents Czech Republic in international women's volleyball competitions and friendly matches under the age 20 and it is ruled by the Czech Volleyball Federation That is an affiliate of International Volleyball Federation FIVB and also a part of European Volleyball Confederation CEV.

== Results ==
=== FIVB U20 World Championship ===
Champions Runners up Third place Fourth place

FIVB U20 World Championship
Year	Round	Position	Pld	W	L	SW	SL	Squad
(Brazil) 1977	See Czechoslovakia							
(Mexico) 1981	See Czechoslovakia							
(Italy) 1985	See Czechoslovakia							
(South Korea) 1987	See Czechoslovakia							
(Peru) 1989	See Czechoslovakia							
(Czechoslovakia) 1991	See Czechoslovakia							
(Brazil) 1993	See Czechoslovakia							
(Thailand) 1995	Didn't qualify							
(Poland) 1997		6th place						Squad
(Canada) 1999		7th place						Squad
(Dominican Republic) 2001		9th place						Squad
(Thailand) 2003	Didn't qualify							
(Turkey) 2005	Didn't qualify							
(Thailand) 2007	Didn't qualify							
(Mexico) 2009		11th place						Squad
(Peru) 2011	Didn't qualify							
(Czech Republic) 2013		11th place						Squad
(Puerto Rico) 2015		12th place						Squad
(Mexico) 2017	Didn't qualify							
Total	0 Titles	6/19						

=== Europe U19 Championship ===
Champions Runners up Third place Fourth place

Europe U19 Championship
Year	Round	Position	Pld	W	L	SW	SL	Squad
(Hungary) 1966	See Czechoslovakia							
(Soviet Union) 1969	See Czechoslovakia							
(Italy) 1971	See Czechoslovakia							
(Netherlands) 1973	See Czechoslovakia							
(West Germany) 1975	See Czechoslovakia							
(Socialist Federal Republic of Yugoslavia) 1977	See Czechoslovakia							
(Spain) 1979	See Czechoslovakia							
(West Germany) 1982	See Czechoslovakia							
(France) 1984	See Czechoslovakia							
(Bulgaria) 1986	See Czechoslovakia							
(Italy) 1988	See Czechoslovakia							
(Austria) 1990	See Czechoslovakia							
(Greece) 1992	See Czechoslovakia							
(Hungary) 1994		8th place						Squad
(Turkey) 1996		10th place						Squad
(Belgium) 1998		Third place						Squad

Europe U19 Championship
Year	Round	Position	Pld	W	L	SW	SL	Squad
(Switzerland) 2000		Champions						Squad
(Croatia) 2002		10th place						Squad
(Slovakia) 2004	Didn't qualify							
(France) 2006		9th place						Squad
(Italy) 2008		10th place						Squad
(Serbia) 2010		Third place						Squad
(Turkey) 2012		10th place						Squad
(Finland) / (Estonia) 2014		6th place						Squad
(Hungary) / (Slovakia) 2016	Didn't qualify							
(Albania) 2018	Didn't qualify							
Total	1 Title	10/26						

== Team ==
=== Current squad ===
The following is the Czechs roster in the 2015 FIVB Volleyball Women's U20 World Championship.

Head Coach: Ales Novak

No.	Name	Date of birth	Height	Weight	Spike	Block	2015 club
2	Daniela Cerna	12 September 1998	1.84 m (6 ft 0 in)	74 kg (163 lb)	312 cm (123 in)	305 cm (120 in)	(Czech Republic) České Budějovice
3	Eva Valentova	3 March 1998	1.74 m (5 ft 9 in)	73 kg (161 lb)	274 cm (108 in)	265 cm (104 in)	(Czech Republic) České Budějovice
4	Veronika Jandova	11 June 1998	1.86 m (6 ft 1 in)	74 kg (163 lb)	306 cm (120 in)	297 cm (117 in)	(Czech Republic) Olymp Praha
6	Klara Mikelova	3 April 1998	1.82 m (6 ft 0 in)	76 kg (168 lb)	293 cm (115 in)	285 cm (112 in)	(Czech Republic) Královo Pole
9	Anna Sucha	28 April 1998	1.81 m (5 ft 11 in)	83 kg (183 lb)	290 cm (110 in)	280 cm (110 in)	(Czech Republic) Královo Pole
10	Gabriela Kopacova	24 June 1998	1.85 m (6 ft 1 in)	70 kg (150 lb)	310 cm (120 in)	303 cm (119 in)	(Czech Republic) Královo Pole
11	Marie Kurkova	20 May 1996	1.81 m (5 ft 11 in)	75 kg (165 lb)	290 cm (110 in)	284 cm (112 in)	(Czech Republic) Olymp Praha
16	Sarah Cruz	8 March 1998	1.84 m (6 ft 0 in)	65 kg (143 lb)	296 cm (117 in)	286 cm (113 in)	(Czech Republic) VK Prostějov
17	Tiziana Baumrukova (C)	29 April 1998	1.75 m (5 ft 9 in)	69 kg (152 lb)	281 cm (111 in)	271 cm (107 in)	(Czech Republic) Olymp Praha
18	Pavlina Simanova	5 April 1996	1.86 m (6 ft 1 in)	80 kg (180 lb)	295 cm (116 in)	287 cm (113 in)	(Czech Republic) Olymp Praha
19	Lucie Nova	3 May 1996	1.84 m (6 ft 0 in)	68 kg (150 lb)	302 cm (119 in)	295 cm (116 in)	(Czech Republic) Olymp Praha
20	Lucie Kalhousova	14 May 1996	1.85 m (6 ft 1 in)	80 kg (180 lb)	300 cm (120 in)	292 cm (115 in)	(Czech Republic) Olymp Praha
