= Belarus women's national under-21 volleyball team =

Belarus U20
- Association: Volleyball Federation Of The Rep. Of Belarus (BVF)
- Confederation: CEV

Uniforms
Home	Away	Third

FIVB U21 World Championship
- Appearances: 2 (First in 2003)
- Best result: 7th place : (2003)

CEV Europe U19 Championship
- Appearances: 6 (First in 2002)
- Best result: (bronze) Bronze : (2002, 2020)
- Official website

The Belarus women's national under-20 volleyball team represents Belarus in international women's volleyball competitions and friendly matches under the age 20 and it is ruled and managed by the Volleyball Federation Of The Rep. Of Belarus (BVF) That is an affiliate of Federation of International Volleyball FIVB and also a part of European Volleyball Confederation CEV. In light of the 2022 Russian invasion of Ukraine, the European Volleyball Confederation (CEV) banned all Belarusian national teams, clubs, and officials from participating in European competition, and suspended all members of Belarus from their respective functions in CEV organs.

== Results ==
=== FIVB U20 World Championship ===
Champions Runners up Third place Fourth place

FIVB U20 World Championship
Year	Round	Position	Pld	W	L	SW	SL	Squad
(Brazil) 1977	See Soviet Union							
(Mexico) 1981	See Soviet Union							
(Italy) 1985	See Soviet Union							
(South Korea) 1987	See Soviet Union							
(Peru) 1989	See Soviet Union							
(Czechoslovakia) 1991	See Soviet Union							
(Brazil) 1993	Didn't Qualify							
(Thailand) 1995	Didn't Qualify							
(Poland) 1997	Didn't Qualify							
(Canada) 1999	Didn't Qualify							
(Dominican Republic) 2001	Didn't Qualify							
(Thailand) 2003		7th place						Squad
(Turkey) 2005	Didn't Qualify							
(Thailand) 2007	Didn't Qualify							
(Mexico) 2009	Didn't Qualify							
(Peru) 2011	Didn't Qualify							
(Czech Republic) 2013	Didn't Qualify							
(Puerto Rico) 2015	Didn't Qualify							
(Mexico) 2017	Didn't Qualify							
(Mexico) 2019	Didn't Qualify							
(Netherlands) (Belgium) 2021		9th place						Squad
Total	0 Titles	2/21						

=== Europe U19 Championship ===
Champions Runners up Third place Fourth place

Europe U19 Championship
Year	Round	Position	Pld	W	L	SW	SL	Squad
(Hungary) 1966	See Soviet Union							
(Soviet Union) 1969	See Soviet Union							
(Italy) 1971	See Soviet Union							
(Netherlands) 1973	See Soviet Union							
(West Germany) 1975	See Soviet Union							
(Socialist Federal Republic of Yugoslavia) 1977	See Soviet Union							
(Spain) 1979	See Soviet Union							
(West Germany) 1982	See Soviet Union							
(France) 1984	See Soviet Union							
(Bulgaria) 1986	See Soviet Union							
(Italy) 1988	See Soviet Union							
(Austria) 1990	See Soviet Union							
(Greece) 1992	Didn't Qualify							
(Hungary) 1994	Didn't Qualify							
(Turkey) 1996	Didn't Qualify							
(Belgium) 1998	Didn't Qualify							

Europe U19 Championship
Year	Round	Position	Pld	W	L	SW	SL	Squad
(Switzerland) 2000								
(Croatia) 2002		Third place						Squad
(Slovakia) 2004		10th place						Squad
(France) 2006		11th place						Squad
(Italy) 2008	Didn't Qualify							
(Serbia) 2010	Didn't Qualify							
(Turkey) 2012	Didn't Qualify							
(Finland) / (Estonia) 2014	Didn't Qualify							
(Hungary) / (Slovakia) 2016		11th place						Squad
(Albania) 2018		8th place						Squad
(Croatia) (Bosnia and Herzegovina) 2020		Third place						Squad
Total	0 Titles	6/27						

== Team ==
=== Previous squad ===
The following is the Belarus roster in the 2021 FIVB Volleyball Women's U20 World Championship.

Head coach: (Belarus) Volha Palcheuskaya

- 1 Liubou Svetnik OH
- 3 Anastasija Svetnik MB
- 4 Dziyana Vaskouskaya L
- 5 Kseniya Liabiodkina OH
- 6 Viktoryia Kastsiuchyk L
- 7 Hanna Karabinovich OP
- 8 Valeryia Turchyna OS
- 9 Darya Sauchuk MB
- 10 Anastasiya Shahun MB
- 11 Lizaveta Bahayeva S
- 12 Darya Borys OH
- 14 Darya Vakulka OP
- 16 Darya Burak MB
- 17 Marharyta Zakharanka S
- 27 Emilia Mikanovich OH

== See also ==
- Belarus women's national volleyball team
- Belarus women's national under-19 volleyball team
