= Kseniya Liabiodkina =

Belarusian volleyball player (born 2002)

Personal information
- Nationality: Belarusian
- Born: 18 February 2002 (age 24); Minsk, Belarus
- Height: 1.82 m (6 ft 0 in)

Volleyball information
- Position: Opposite hitter
- Current club: Göztepey
- Number: 5

Career
Years
- 2018–2019
- 2019–2021
- 2021–2023
- 2023–2026
- 2026–
Teams
- RGUOR Minsk
- Minchanka-2 U20
- Minchanka Minsk
- Tulitsa Tula
- Göztepe

National team
- 2017
- 2019–2020
- 2021
- Belarus U17
- Belarus U19
- Belarus U21
Honours
Women's volleyball
Representing Belarus

Kseniya Liabiodkina (born 18 February 2002) is a Belarusian volleyball player. She is an opposite hitter. She was part of the national women's U17, U19 and U21 teams. She plays in the topflight Turkish Volleyball League for Göztepe.

== Club career ==
Standing 1.82 m (5 ft 11 1/2 in) tall, Liabiodkina is an opposite hitter.

Liabiodkina played for hometown clubs in Belarus between 2018 and 2023. She won the champions title with Minchanka Minsk four consecutive Belarusian League seasons from 2019–20 to 2022–23, and won the Belarusian Cup in the 2020–21 and 2021–22 seasons. In 2023, she went to Russia, and joined Tulitsa Tula. In May 2026, she moved to Turkey and signed with the İzmir-based club Göztepe to play in the topflight Volleyball League.

== International career ==
=== Belarus U17 ===
Liabiodkina was called up to the Belarus national U17 team, and took part at the 2017 FIVB Volleyball Girls' U18 World Championship in Argentina that finished on the ninth place. At the 2017 Girls' U16 European Volleyball Championship in Bulgaria, her team took the fourth place, while she was selected to the "Dream Team" as one the two "Best Outside Hitter"s.

=== Belarus U19 ===
As part of the national U19 team, Liabiodkina played at the 2019 FIVB Volleyball Girls' U18 World Championship in Egypt that finished as seventeenth. She captained her team at the 020 Women's U19 Volleyball European Championship in Zenica, Bosnia and Herzegovina, and won the bronze medal. She was named as one of the two "Best Outside Hitter"s.

=== Belarus U21 ===
With the national U21 team, Liabiodkina played at the 2021 FIVB Volleyball Women's U20 World Championship in Kortrijk, Belgium that finished ninth.

== Personal life ==
Kseniya Liabiodkina was born in Minsk, Belarus on 18 February 2002.

== Honours ==
=== Club ===
Minchanka

Belarusian Women's Volleyball Lrague

(gold) Champions (4)
2019–20, 2020–21, 2021–22, 2022–23

Belarusian Women"s Volleyball Cup

(gold) Winners (2)

2020–21, 2021–22

=== Internatiomal ===
Belarus U19

(bronze) Third places (1)
2020 Women's U19 European Championship

=== Individual ===
Best Outside Hitter (2)

2017 Girls' U16 European Championship
2020 Women's U19 European Championship
