= Bulgaria women's national under-21 volleyball team =

Youth volleyball team representing Bulgaria

Bulgaria U20
- Association: Bulgarian Volleyball Federation
- Confederation: CEV

Uniforms
Home	Away	Third

FIVB U21 World Championship
- Appearances: 7 (First in 1985)
- Best result: 4th place : (2009)

CEV Europe U19 Championship
- Appearances: 20 (First in 1967)
- Best result: (silver) Runners-Up : (1969 1982)

The Bulgaria women's national under-20 volleyball team represents Bulgaria in international women's volleyball competitions and friendly matches under the age 20 and it is ruled by the Bulgarian Volleyball Federation That is an affiliate of International Volleyball Federation FIVB and also a part of European Volleyball Confederation CEV.

== Results ==
=== FIVB U20 World Championship ===
Champions Runners up Third place Fourth place

FIVB U20 World Championship
Year	Round	Position	Pld	W	L	SW	SL	Squad
(Brazil) 1977	Didn't Compete							
(Mexico) 1981	Didn't Compete							
(Italy) 1985		9th place						Squad
(South Korea) 1987		7th place						Squad
(Peru) 1989	Didn't Qualify							
(Czechoslovakia) 1991		10th place						Squad
(Brazil) 1993	Didn't Qualify							
(Thailand) 1995	Didn't Qualify							
(Poland) 1997	Didn't Qualify							
(Canada) 1999	Didn't Qualify							
(Dominican Republic) 2001	Didn't Qualify							
(Thailand) 2003	Didn't Qualify							
(Turkey) 2005	Didn't Qualify							
(Thailand) 2007	Didn't Qualify							
(Mexico) 2009		4th place						Squad
(Peru) 2011	Didn't Qualify							
(Czech Republic) 2013		9th place						Squad
(Puerto Rico) 2015		8th place						Squad
(Mexico) 2017		8th place						Squad
Total	0 Titles	7/19						

=== Europe U19 Championship ===
Champions Runners up Third place Fourth place

Europe U19 Championship
Year	Round	Position	Pld	W	L	SW	SL	Squad
(Hungary) 1966		4th place						Squad
(Soviet Union) 1969		2nd place						Squad
(Italy) 1971		6th place						Squad
(Netherlands) 1973		8th place						Squad
(West Germany) 1975		4th place						Squad
(Socialist Federal Republic of Yugoslavia) 1977		8th place						Squad
(Spain) 1979		4th place						Squad
(West Germany) 1982		2nd place						Squad
(France) 1984		4th place						Squad
(Bulgaria) 1986		Third place						Squad
(Italy) 1988		4th place						Squad
(Austria) 1990		6th place						Squad
(Greece) 1992		6th place						Squad
(Hungary) 1994	Didn't Qualify							
(Turkey) 1996	Didn't Qualify							
(Belgium) 1998		12th place						Squad

Europe U19 Championship
Year	Round	Position	Pld	W	L	SW	SL	Squad
(Switzerland) 2000	Didn't Qualify							
(Croatia) 2002	Didn't Qualify							
(Slovakia) 2004	Didn't Qualify							
(France) 2006	Didn't Qualify							
(Italy) 2008	Didn't Qualify							
(Serbia) 2010	Didn't Qualify							
(Turkey) 2012		11th place						Squad
(Finland) / (Estonia) 2014		5th place						Squad
(Hungary) / (Slovakia) 2016		8th place						Squad
(Albania) 2018		9th place						Squad
Total	0 Titles	18/26						

== Team ==
=== Current squad ===
The following is the Bulgarian roster in the 2015 FIVB Volleyball Women's U20 World Championship.

Head Coach: Ivan Petkov

No.	Name	Date of birth	Height	Weight	Spike	Block	2015 club
2	Slavena Nikova	7 June 1996	1.80 m (5 ft 11 in)	72 kg (159 lb)	290 cm (110 in)	280 cm (110 in)	(Bulgaria) CSKA
3	Elitsa Barakova	11 March 1997	1.84 m (6 ft 0 in)	60 kg (130 lb)	290 cm (110 in)	280 cm (110 in)	(Bulgaria) Kazanlak
4	Polina Neykova	7 October 1998	1.82 m (6 ft 0 in)	73 kg (161 lb)	287 cm (113 in)	280 cm (110 in)	(Bulgaria) CSKA
5	Simona Nikolova	29 July 1997	1.90 m (6 ft 3 in)	75 kg (165 lb)	308 cm (121 in)	300 cm (120 in)	(Bulgaria) Maritza
6	Iveta Stanchulova (C)	11 August 1997	1.86 m (6 ft 1 in)	72 kg (159 lb)	290 cm (110 in)	285 cm (112 in)	(Bulgaria) CSKA
9	Vangeliya Rachkovska	19 July 1997	1.85 m (6 ft 1 in)	67 kg (148 lb)	296 cm (117 in)	281 cm (111 in)	(Bulgaria) Maritza
10	Gergana Dimitrova	28 February 1996	1.84 m (6 ft 0 in)	71 kg (157 lb)	305 cm (120 in)	288 cm (113 in)	(Bulgaria) Sm'Aesch
12	Miroslava Paskova	16 February 1996	1.80 m (5 ft 11 in)	67 kg (148 lb)	299 cm (118 in)	280 cm (110 in)	(Bulgaria) Levski
13	Kristiana Petrova	13 July 1997	1.77 m (5 ft 10 in)	70 kg (150 lb)	290 cm (110 in)	282 cm (111 in)	(Bulgaria) Levski
14	Radostina Marinova	2 October 1998	1.83 m (6 ft 0 in)	62 kg (137 lb)	287 cm (113 in)	279 cm (110 in)	(Bulgaria) Maritza
15	Zhana Todorova	6 January 1997	1.70 m (5 ft 7 in)	56 kg (123 lb)	271 cm (107 in)	255 cm (100 in)	(Bulgaria) Maritza
19	Mirela Shahpazova	28 October 1997	1.75 m (5 ft 9 in)	65 kg (143 lb)	280 cm (110 in)	270 cm (110 in)	(Bulgaria) Maritza

== See also ==
- Bulgaria women's team
- Bulgaria women's U18 team
- Bulgaria women's U20 team
- Bulgaria women's U23 team
- Bulgaria men's team
