= France women's national under-21 volleyball team =

Youth volleyball team representing France

France U20
- Association: French Volleyball Federation
- Confederation: CEV

Uniforms
Home	Away	Third

FIVB U21 World Championship
- Appearances: 1 (First in 1987)
- Best result: 12th Place : (1987)

Europe U19 Championship
- Appearances: 15 (First in 1973)
- Best result: 4th place : (1992, 1996)
- French Volleyball Federation (in French)

The France women's national under-20 volleyball team represents France in international women's volleyball competitions and friendly matches under the age 20 and it is ruled by the French Volleyball Federation That is an affiliate of Federation of International Volleyball FIVB and also a part of European Volleyball Confederation CEV.

== Results ==
=== FIVB U20 World Championship ===
Champions Runners up Third place Fourth place

FIVB U20 World Championship
Year	Round	Position	Pld	W	L	SW	SL	Squad
(Brazil) 1977	Did not qualify							
(Mexico) 1981	Did not qualify							
(Italy) 1985	Did not qualify							
(South Korea) 1987		12th place						Squad
(Peru) 1989	Did not qualify							
(Czechoslovakia) 1991	Did not qualify							
(Brazil) 1993	Did not qualify							
(Thailand) 1995	Did not qualify							
(Poland) 1997	Did not qualify							
(Canada) 1999	Did not qualify							
(Dominican Republic) 2001	Did not qualify							
(Thailand) 2003	Did not qualify							
(Turkey) 2005	Did not qualify							
(Thailand) 2007	Did not qualify							
(Mexico) 2009	Did not qualify							
(Peru) 2011	Did not qualify							
(Czech Republic) 2013	Did not qualify							
(Puerto Rico) 2015	Did not qualify							
(Mexico) 2017	Did not qualify							
Total	0 Titles	1/19						

=== Europe U19 Championship ===
Champions Runners up Third place Fourth place

Europe U19 Championship
Year	Round	Position	Pld	W	L	SW	SL	Squad
(Hungary) 1966	Did not qualify							
(Soviet Union) 1969	Did not qualify							
(Italy) 1971	Did not qualify							
(Netherlands) 1973		13th place						Squad
(West Germany) 1975		12th place						Squad
(Socialist Federal Republic of Yugoslavia) 1977	Did not qualify							
(Spain) 1979	Did not qualify							
(West Germany) 1982		7th place						Squad
(France) 1984		11th place						Squad
(Bulgaria) 1986	Did not qualify							
(Italy) 1988		8th place						Squad
(Austria) 1990	Did not qualify							
(Greece) 1992		4th place						Squad
(Hungary) 1994		11th place						Squad
(Turkey) 1996		4th place						Squad
(Belgium) 1998		10th place						Squad

Europe U19 Championship
Year	Round	Position	Pld	W	L	SW	SL	Squad
(Switzerland) 2000	Did not qualify							
(Croatia) 2002		9th place						Squad
(Slovakia) 2004	Did not qualify							
(France) 2006		7th place						Squad
(Italy) 2008		9th place						Squad
(Serbia) 2010	Did not qualify							
(Turkey) 2012		12th place						Squad
(Finland) / (Estonia) 2014	Did not qualify							
(Hungary) / (Slovakia) 2016		9th place						Squad
(Albania) 2018		11th place						Squad
Total	0 Titles	15/26						

== Team ==
=== Current squad ===
The Following players is the French players that Competed in the 2018 Women's U19 Volleyball European Championship

#	name	position	height	weight	birthday	spike	block
1	gelin juliette	libero	162	63	2001	288	273
2	andriamaherizo marie	middle-blocker	189	80	2001	304	295
3	kordjani emma	setter	172	68	2001	287	277
4	mauriat mahe	setter	172	62	2000	289	270
5	rotar amélie	outside-spiker	188	69	2000	311	295
6	bakana tess	outside-spiker	178	72	2001	301	288
7	rovira fétia-here	outside-spiker	191	94	2003	315	299
8	graw maeliss	outside-spiker	185	72	2000	300	289
9	cholet jade	outside-spiker	184	66	2000	300	286
10	davidovic iva	outside-spiker	182	80	2000	298	287
11	poulain anaïs	outside-spiker	179	58	2000	289	279
12	giordano pauline	setter	177	62	2000	290	281
13	souidi yousra	libero	162	58	2000	255	245
14	diouf guewe	outside-spiker	182	75	2002	315	290
15	sylves amandha marine	middle-blocker	193	84	2000	321	309
16	nama atangana victoire	outside-spiker	186	82	2000	308	291
17	le roux emma	libero	172	68	2000	287	277
18	vidaller stella	libero	161	50	2002	270	261
19	massuel camille	middle-blocker	184	73	2000	300	291
20	henyo julie	outside-spiker	177	68	2002	300	282
21	respaut emilie	setter	176	56	2003	283	267
22	moreels manon	outside-spiker	178	70	2001	297	282
	kone kendiaba	middle-blocker	184	72	2001	310	299
