= 2018 Women's U19 Volleyball European Championship Qualification =

This is an article about qualification for the 2018 Women's U19 Volleyball European Championship.

== Qualification summary ==
- Albania
- Belarus
- Bulgaria
- France
- Germany
- Italy
- Netherlands
- Poland
- Russia
- Serbia
- Slovakia
- Turkey

== Pool standing procedure ==
1. Number of matches won
2. Match points
3. Sets ratio
4. Points ratio
5. Result of the last match between the tied teams

Match won 3–0 or 3–1: 3 match points for the winner, 0 match points for the loser
Match won 3–2: 2 match points for the winner, 1 match point for the loser

== Direct qualification ==
Host countries, Albania, qualified for final round directly.

== Qualification ==
The winners of each pools and the best three second placed teams qualified for final round.

- Pools composition

First round

Pool 1	Pool 2
Sweden	Israel
Ukraine	Belarus
Cyprus	Montenegro
Iceland	Georgia

Second round

Pool A	Pool B	Pool C	Pool D	Pool E	Pool F	Pool G
Serbia	Russia	Italy	Bulgaria	Turkey	Belgium	Poland
Netherlands	Slovenia	Czech Rep	Estonia	Croatia	France	Germany
Hungary	Finland	Austria	Greece	Slovakia	Romania	Latvia
Denmark	1st Pool 1	Norway	Switzerland	Spain	1st Pool 2	Portugal

== First round ==
=== Pool 1 ===
- All times are Kiev Time (UTC+02:00).
- venue: Budivelnyk Sports Palace, Cherkasy, Ukraine

Pos	Team	Pld	W	L	Pts	SW	SL	SR	SPW	SPL	SPR	Qualification
1	Ukraine	3	3	0	9	9	1	9.000	243	171	1.421	Second round
2	Sweden	3	2	1	5	7	5	1.400	255	240	1.063	
3	Cyprus	3	1	2	4	5	6	0.833	221	229	0.965	
4	Iceland	3	0	3	0	0	9	0.000	146	225	0.649	

Date	Time		Score		Set 1	Set 2	Set 3	Set 4	Set 5	Total	Report
11 Jan	16:00	Sweden	1–3	Ukraine	23–25	25–18	12–25	18–25		78–93	Report
11 Jan	19:00	Iceland	0–3	Cyprus	21–25	20–25	21–25			62–75	Report
12 Jan	16:00	Ukraine	3–0	Cyprus	25–17	25–17	25–11			75–45	Report
12 Jan	19:00	Sweden	3–0	Iceland	25–18	25–10	25–18			75–46	Report
13 Jan	16:00	Ukraine	3–0	Iceland	25–23	25–8	25–17			75–48	Report
13 Jan	19:00	Cyprus	2–3	Sweden	25–12	15–25	22–25	27–25	12–15	101–102	Report

=== Pool 2 ===
- All times are Central European Time (UTC+01:00).
- venue: Sport Center Igalo, Herceg Novi, Montenegro

Pos	Team	Pld	W	L	Pts	SW	SL	SR	SPW	SPL	SPR	Qualification
1	Belarus	3	3	0	9	9	0	MAX	225	133	1.692	Second round
2	Montenegro	3	2	1	6	6	3	2.000	210	170	1.235	
3	Israel	3	1	2	3	3	7	0.429	163	225	0.724	
4	Georgia	3	0	3	0	1	9	0.111	174	244	0.713	

Date	Time		Score		Set 1	Set 2	Set 3	Set 4	Set 5	Total	Report
12 Jan	16:00	Israel	0–3	Belarus	23–25	11–25	4–25			38–75	Report
12 Jan	18:30	Montenegro	3–0	Georgia	25–23	25–20	25–21			75–64	Report
13 Jan	16:00	Belarus	3–0	Georgia	25–11	25–15	25–9			75–35	Report
13 Jan	18:30	Israel	0–3	Montenegro	12–25	6–25	13–25			31–75	Report
14 Jan	12:00	Georgia	1–3	Israel	10–25	25–18	24–26	16–25		75–94	Report
14 Jan	16:30	Belarus	3–0	Montenegro	25–19	25–20	25–21			75–60	Report

== Second round ==
=== Pool A ===
- All times are Central European Summer Time (UTC+02:00).
- venue: Sport Hall, Zrenjanin, Serbia

Pos	Team	Pld	W	L	Pts	SW	SL	SR	SPW	SPL	SPR	Qualification
1	Serbia	3	3	0	9	9	2	4.500	275	204	1.348	2018 European Championship
2	Netherlands	3	2	1	6	7	3	2.333	229	206	1.112	Third round
3	Denmark	3	1	2	3	4	7	0.571	217	258	0.841	
4	Hungary	3	0	3	0	1	9	0.111	183	236	0.775	

Date	Time		Score		Set 1	Set 2	Set 3	Set 4	Set 5	Total	Report
26 Apr	15:00	Denmark	0–3	Netherlands	20–25	20–25	19–25			59–75	Report
26 Apr	17:30	Serbia	3–0	Hungary	25–22	25–10	25–21			75–53	Report
27 Apr	15:00	Netherlands	3–0	Hungary	25–12	25–15	25–17			75–44	Report
27 Apr	17:30	Denmark	1–3	Serbia	10–25	21–25	25–22	16–25		72–97	Report
28 Apr	15:00	Hungary	1–3	Denmark	22–25	19–25	25–11	20–25		86–86	Report
28 Apr	17:30	Netherlands	1–3	Serbia	30–28	16–25	15–25	18–25		79–103	Report

=== Pool B ===
- All times are Moscow Time (UTC+03:00).
- venue: Sport Hall Voleygrad, Anapa, Russia

Pos	Team	Pld	W	L	Pts	SW	SL	SR	SPW	SPL	SPR	Qualification
1	Russia	2	2	0	6	6	0	MAX	150	114	1.316	2018 European Championship
2	Slovenia	2	1	1	3	3	3	1.000	133	138	0.964	Third round
3	Finland	2	0	2	0	0	6	0.000	119	150	0.793	

Date	Time		Score		Set 1	Set 2	Set 3	Set 4	Set 5	Total	Report
26 Apr	17:30	Finland	0–3	Russia	17–25	20–25	19–25			56–75	Report
27 Apr	17:30	Russia	3–0	Slovenia	25–21	25–19	25–18			75–58	Report
28 Apr	15:00	Finland	0–3	Slovenia	20–25	23–25	20–25			63–75	Report

- Ukraine withdrew.

=== Pool C ===
- All times are Central European Summer Time (UTC+02:00).
- venue: Palazzetto dello Sport, Concorezzo, Italy

Pos	Team	Pld	W	L	Pts	SW	SL	SR	SPW	SPL	SPR	Qualification
1	Italy	3	3	0	9	9	1	9.000	248	164	1.512	2018 European Championship
2	Norway	3	1	2	4	5	6	0.833	215	225	0.956	Third round
3	Czech Republic	3	1	2	3	6	8	0.750	276	270	1.022	
4	Austria	3	1	2	2	3	8	0.375	170	250	0.680	

Date	Time		Score		Set 1	Set 2	Set 3	Set 4	Set 5	Total	Report
27 Apr	16:00	Austria	3–2	Czech Republic	13–25	25–17	25–20	3–25	15–13	81–100	Report
27 Apr	19:00	Italy	3–0	Norway	25–18	25–20	25–11			75–49	Report
28 Apr	16:00	Czech Republic	3–2	Norway	25–19	25–15	23–25	18–25	15–7	106–91	Report
28 Apr	19:00	Austria	0–3	Italy	16–25	14–25	15–25			45–75	Report
29 Apr	16:00	Norway	3–0	Austria	25–15	25–10	25–19			75–44	Report
29 Apr	19:00	Czech Republic	1–3	Italy	16–25	15–25	25–23	14–25		70–98	Report

=== Pool D ===
- All times are Eastern European Summer Time (UTC+03:00).
- venue: Portaria Sport Hall, Volos, Greece

Pos	Team	Pld	W	L	Pts	SW	SL	SR	SPW	SPL	SPR	Qualification
1	Bulgaria	3	3	0	8	9	2	4.500	240	178	1.348	2018 European Championship
2	Greece	3	2	1	7	8	4	2.000	268	215	1.247	Third round
3	Switzerland	3	1	2	3	4	6	0.667	196	225	0.871	
4	Estonia	3	0	3	0	0	9	0.000	140	226	0.619	

Date	Time		Score		Set 1	Set 2	Set 3	Set 4	Set 5	Total	Report
26 Apr	17:00	Estonia	0–3	Bulgaria	12–25	12–24	16–25			40–74	Report
26 Apr	19:30	Greece	3–1	Switzerland	25–21	25–12	23–25	25–19		98–77	Report
27 Apr	17:00	Bulgaria	3–0	Switzerland	25–16	25–14	25–14			75–44	Report
27 Apr	19:30	Estonia	0–3	Greece	24–26	14–25	10–25			48–76	Report
28 Apr	16:00	Switzerland	3–0	Estonia	25–15	25–15	25–22			75–52	Report
28 Apr	18:30	Bulgaria	3–2	Greece	25–13	10–25	25–20	15–25	15–11	90–94	Report

=== Pool E ===
- All times are Central European Summer Time (UTC+02:00).
- venue: Mestská Športová Hala, Humenné, Slovakia

Pos	Team	Pld	W	L	Pts	SW	SL	SR	SPW	SPL	SPR	Qualification
1	Turkey	3	3	0	9	9	2	4.500	272	217	1.253	2018 European Championship
2	Slovakia	3	2	1	6	6	3	2.000	205	184	1.114	Third round
3	Croatia	3	1	2	3	4	7	0.571	229	253	0.905	
4	Spain	3	0	3	0	2	9	0.222	211	263	0.802	

Date	Time		Score		Set 1	Set 2	Set 3	Set 4	Set 5	Total	Report
27 Apr	15:00	Croatia	3–1	Spain	16–25	25–21	25–19	25–16		91–81	Report
27 Apr	17:30	Turkey	3–0	Slovakia	28–26	25–14	25–15			78–55	Report
28 Apr	17:30	Spain	0–3	Slovakia	20–25	12–25	13–25			45–75	Report
28 Apr	20:00	Croatia	1–3	Turkey	25–22	15–25	17–25	20–25		77–97	Report
29 Apr	15:00	Spain	1–3	Turkey	22–25	25–22	15–25	23–25		85–97	Report
29 Apr	20:00	Slovakia	3–0	Croatia	25–21	25–20	25–20			75–61	Report

=== Pool F ===
- All times are Eastern European Summer Time (UTC+03:00).
- venue: Olimpia Sports Hall, Ploiești, Romania

Pos	Team	Pld	W	L	Pts	SW	SL	SR	SPW	SPL	SPR	Qualification
1	France	3	2	1	6	8	5	1.600	288	279	1.032	2018 European Championship
2	Belarus	3	2	1	5	6	5	1.200	245	229	1.070	Third round
3	Romania	3	2	1	5	8	7	1.143	297	293	1.014	Third round
4	Belgium	3	0	3	2	4	9	0.444	255	284	0.898	

Date	Time		Score		Set 1	Set 2	Set 3	Set 4	Set 5	Total	Report
26 Apr	20:00	Belarus	3–2	Romania	17–25	25–20	19–25	25–15	15–10	101–95	Report
27 Apr	15:00	France	3–0	Belarus	26–24	25–22	25–23			76–69	Report
27 Apr	17:30	Romania	3–2	Belgium	17–25	25–16	25–15	16–25	15–10	98–91	Report
28 Apr	15:00	Belgium	2–3	France	20–25	23–25	25–22	26–24	12–15	106–111	Report
29 Apr	15:00	Belgium	0–3	Belarus	22–25	21–25	15–25			58–75	Report
29 Apr	17:30	Romania	3–2	France	24–26	15–25	25–20	25–21	15–9	104–101	Report

=== Pool G ===
- All times are Central European Summer Time (UTC+02:00).
- venue: Ballsporthalle, Vilsbiburg, Germany

Pos	Team	Pld	W	L	Pts	SW	SL	SR	SPW	SPL	SPR	Qualification
1	Poland	3	3	0	8	9	2	4.500	255	190	1.342	2018 European Championship
2	Germany	3	2	1	7	8	3	2.667	260	182	1.429	Third round
3	Latvia	3	1	2	3	3	7	0.429	178	220	0.809	
4	Portugal	3	0	3	0	1	9	0.111	147	248	0.593	

Date	Time		Score		Set 1	Set 2	Set 3	Set 4	Set 5	Total	Report
26 Apr	16:00	Latvia	0–3	Poland	14–25	14–25	15–25			43–75	Report
26 Apr	19:00	Germany	3–0	Portugal	25–10	25–11	25–19			75–40	Report
27 Apr	16:00	Poland	3–0	Portugal	25–18	25–9	25–10			75–37	Report
27 Apr	19:00	Latvia	0–3	Germany	8–25	18–25	11–25			37–75	Report
28 Apr	16:00	Portugal	1–3	Latvia	17–25	14–25	25–23	14–25		70–98	Report
28 Apr	19:00	Poland	3–2	Germany	20–25	18–25	26–24	26–24	15–12	105–110	Report

== Second round ==
=== Pool H ===
- All times are Eastern European Summer Time (UTC+03:00).
- venue: Olimpia Sports Hall, Ploiești, Romania

Pos	Team	Pld	W	L	Pts	SW	SL	SR	SPW	SPL	SPR	Qualification
1	Belarus	3	3	0	9	9	2	4.500	276	246	1.122	2018 European Championship
2	Germany	3	2	1	6	7	4	1.750	256	227	1.128	2018 European Championship
3	Romania	3	1	2	3	4	7	0.571	255	243	1.049	
4	Norway	3	0	3	0	2	9	0.222	202	273	0.740	

Date	Time		Score		Set 1	Set 2	Set 3	Set 4	Set 5	Total	Report
29 Jun	17:30	Germany	3–1	Romania	20–25	25–23	25–17	25–19		95–84	Report
29 Jun	20:00	Belarus	3–1	Norway	23–25	25–17	25–20	27–25		100–87	Report
30 Jun	17:30	Romania	3–1	Norway	25–14	23–25	25–18	25–12		98–69	Report
30 Jun	20:00	Germany	1–3	Belarus	18–25	23–25	25–22	20–25		86–97	Report
1 Jul	17:30	Romania	0–3	Belarus	26–28	24–26	23–25			73–79	Report
1 Jul	20:00	Norway	0–3	Germany	20–25	9–25	17–25			46–75	Report

=== Pool I ===
- All times are Eastern European Summer Time (UTC+03:00).
- venue: Vathi Sports Hall, Samos, Greece

Pos	Team	Pld	W	L	Pts	SW	SL	SR	SPW	SPL	SPR	Qualification
1	Slovakia	3	3	0	8	9	2	4.500	250	216	1.157	2018 European Championship
2	Netherlands	3	2	1	7	8	3	2.667	257	219	1.174	2018 European Championship
3	Slovenia	3	1	2	3	3	6	0.500	192	217	0.885	
4	Greece	3	0	3	0	0	9	0.000	180	227	0.793	

Date	Time		Score		Set 1	Set 2	Set 3	Set 4	Set 5	Total	Report
28 Jun	17:00	Slovenia	0–3	Netherlands	18–25	22–25	20–25			60–75	Report
28 Jun	20:30	Greece	0–3	Slovakia	15–25	16–25	23–25			54–75	Report
29 Jun	17:00	Netherlands	2–3	Slovakia	22–25	25–22	22–25	25–13	12–15	106–100	Report
29 Jun	20:30	Slovenia	3–0	Greece	25–21	26–24	25–22			76–67	Report
30 Jun	16:30	Slovakia	3–0	Slovenia	25–19	25–17	25–20			75–56	Report
30 Jun	20:00	Netherlands	3–0	Greece	25–14	26–24	25–21			76–59	Report
