= 2020 Women's U19 Volleyball European Championship =

Women's sporting event

Tournament details
- Host country: Bosnia and Herzegovina; Croatia
- Dates: 22 – 30 August 2020
- Teams: 9
- Venues: 2 (in 2 host cities)

Final positions
- Champions: Turkey (2nd title)

Tournament awards
- MVP: (Turkey) İpar Özay Kurt

The 2020 Women's Junior European Volleyball Championship was the 27th edition of the competition, with the main phase (contested between 9 teams) held in Bosnia and Herzegovina and Croatia from 22 to 30 August 2020.

== Qualification ==
The qualifying stage for the final tournament was cancelled due to the COVID-19 pandemic by the CEV on 15 June 2020. The tournament itself will be held with participants determined from European Ranking after the respective National Federations confirm their participation in the event. On 16 July, it was announced that all of them confirmed the wish to use their respective slot.

Means of qualification		Qualifier
Host Countries		Bosnia and Herzegovina
Host Countries		Croatia
~~Qualification 2nd round~~	~~Pool A~~	Russia (1)
~~Qualification 2nd round~~	~~Pool B~~	Italy (2)
~~Qualification 2nd round~~	~~Pool C~~	Turkey (3)
~~Qualification 2nd round~~	~~Pool D~~	Serbia (3)
~~Qualification 2nd round~~	~~Pool E~~	Germany (5)
~~Qualification 2nd round~~	~~Pool F~~	Slovakia (6)
~~Qualification 2nd round~~	~~Pool G~~	Bulgaria (7)
~~Qualification 3rd round~~	~~Pool H~~	Belarus (8)
~~Qualification 3rd round~~	~~Pool I~~	France (9)
~~Qualification 3rd round~~	~~Best runner up~~	Poland (10)

== Venues ==
Pool I, Final round		Pool II, Classification matches	
Zenica, Bosnia and Herzegovina	Zenica is located in Bosnia and Herzegovina	Osijek, Croatia	Osijek is located in Croatia
Arena Zenica	Zenica is located in Bosnia and Herzegovina	Gradski vrt Hall	Osijek is located in Croatia
Capacity: 6,200	Zenica is located in Bosnia and Herzegovina	Capacity: 3,500	Osijek is located in Croatia

== Pools composition ==
The drawing of lots was combined with a seeding of National Federations and performed as follows:

1. The two organisers were seeded in Preliminary pools. Bosnia and Herzegovina in Pool I and Croatia in Pool II.
2. Remaining 10 participating teams drawn after they were previously placed in five cups as per their position in the latest European Ranking

Pot 1	Pot 2	Pot 3	Pot 4	Pot 5
Russia; Italy	Turkey; Serbia	Germany; Slovakia	Bulgaria; Belarus	France; Poland

Result

The drawing of lots was held on 23 July 2020 in Luxembourg.

Pool I	Pool II
Bosnia and Herzegovina	Croatia
Italy	Russia
Serbia	Turkey
Slovakia	Germany
Belarus	Bulgaria
Poland	France

Before the start of the tournament it was announced that Italy, Russia and Germany have withdrawn due to travel restrictions imposed by COVID-19 pandemic.

== Preliminary round ==
=== Pool I ===
Pos	Team	Pld	W	L	Pts	SW	SL	SR	SPW	SPL	SPR	Qualification
1	Belarus	4	4	0	10	12	5	2.400	375	346	1.084	Semifinals
2	Serbia	4	3	1	10	11	4	2.750	352	296	1.189	Semifinals
3	Poland	4	2	2	7	8	6	1.333	324	269	1.204	5th–8th semifinals
4	Slovakia	4	1	3	3	5	10	0.500	331	356	0.930	5th–8th semifinals
5	Bosnia and Herzegovina	4	0	4	0	1	12	0.083	210	325	0.646	

Date	Time		Score		Set 1	Set 2	Set 3	Set 4	Set 5	Total	Report
22 Aug	17:30	Serbia	3–1	Slovakia	25–19	25–20	22–25	25–20		97–84	Report
22 Aug	20:00	Bosnia and Herzegovina	0–3	Poland	11–25	12–25	10–25			33–75	Report
23 Aug	17:30	Poland	3–0	Slovakia	27–25	25–15	25–18			77–58	Report
23 Aug	20:00	Belarus	3–2	Serbia	16–25	25–21	25–21	20–25	15–13	101–105	Report
24 Aug	17:30	Slovakia	1–3	Belarus	25–20	24–26	19–25	21–25		89–96	Report
24 Aug	20:00	Serbia	3–0	Bosnia and Herzegovina	25–23	25–11	25–13			75–47	Report
26 Aug	17:30	Poland	2–3	Belarus	23–25	23–25	25–19	25–19	12–15	108–103	Report
26 Aug	20:00	Bosnia and Herzegovina	1–3	Slovakia	19–25	25–22	26–28	16–25		86–100	Report
27 Aug	17:30	Serbia	3–0	Poland	25–22	25–21	25–21			75–64	Report
27 Aug	20:00	Belarus	3–0	Bosnia and Herzegovina	25–16	25–18	25–10			75–44	Report

=== Pool II ===
Pos	Team	Pld	W	L	Pts	SW	SL	SR	SPW	SPL	SPR	Qualification
1	France	3	3	0	8	9	3	3.000	286	242	1.182	Semifinals
2	Turkey	3	2	1	6	7	3	2.333	241	213	1.131	Semifinals
3	Bulgaria	3	1	2	2	3	8	0.375	230	261	0.881	5th–8th semifinals
4	Croatia	3	0	3	2	4	9	0.444	263	304	0.865	5th–8th semifinals

Date	Time		Score		Set 1	Set 2	Set 3	Set 4	Set 5	Total	Report
22 Aug	17:30	Croatia	2–3	France	24–26	26–24	14–25	25–23	7–15	96–113	Report
22 Aug	20:00	Turkey	3–0	Bulgaria	25–22	25–17	25–20			75–59	Report
24 Aug	17:30	Croatia	0–3	Turkey	15–25	22–25	19–25			56–75	Report
24 Aug	20:00	France	3–0	Bulgaria	25–17	25–17	25–21			75–55	Report
26 Aug	17:30	Bulgaria	3–2	Croatia	27–25	24–26	25–19	22–25	18–16	116–111	Report
26 Aug	20:00	Turkey	1–3	France	25–23	22–25	23–25	21–25		91–98	Report

== 5th–8th classification ==
Semifinals
29 August
Poland	3
Croatia	0
29 August
Bulgaria	3
Slovakia	0

5th place match
30 August
Poland	3
Bulgaria	0
7th place match
30 August
Croatia	3
Slovakia	1

=== 5th–8th semifinals ===
Date	Time		Score		Set 1	Set 2	Set 3	Set 4	Set 5	Total	Report
29 Aug	17:30	Poland	3–0	Croatia	25–20	25–19	25–8			75–47	Report
29 Aug	20:00	Bulgaria	3–0	Slovakia	25–17	25–23	25–17			75–57	Report

=== 7th place match ===
Date	Time		Score		Set 1	Set 2	Set 3	Set 4	Set 5	Total	Report
30 Aug	15:00	Croatia	3–1	Slovakia	25–17	21–25	25–10	25–20		96–72	Report

=== 5th place match ===
Date	Time		Score		Set 1	Set 2	Set 3	Set 4	Set 5	Total	Report
30 Aug	17:30	Poland	3–0	Bulgaria	25–19	25–23	25–17			75–59	Report

== Final round ==
Semifinals
29 August
Belarus	1
Turkey	3
29 August
France	1
Serbia	3

Final
30 August
Turkey	3
Serbia	2
3rd place match
30 August
Belarus	3
France	1

=== Semifinals ===
Date	Time		Score		Set 1	Set 2	Set 3	Set 4	Set 5	Total	Report
29 Aug	17:00	Belarus	1–3	Turkey	25–21	17–25	22–25	24–26		88–97	Report
29 Aug	19:30	France	1–3	Serbia	25–23	15–25	20–25	14–25		74–98	Report

=== 3rd place match ===
Date	Time		Score		Set 1	Set 2	Set 3	Set 4	Set 5	Total	Report
30 Aug	17:00	Belarus	3–1	France	25–18	25–21	23–25	27–25		100–89	Report

=== Final ===
Date	Time		Score		Set 1	Set 2	Set 3	Set 4	Set 5	Total	Report
30 Aug	20:00	Turkey	3–2	Serbia	25–17	16–25	23–25	25–16	15–8	104–91	Report

== Final standing ==
Rank	Team
1st place, gold medalist(s)	Turkey
2nd place, silver medalist(s)	Serbia
3rd place, bronze medalist(s)	Belarus
4	France
5	Poland
6	Bulgaria
7	Croatia
8	Slovakia
9	Bosnia and Herzegovina

Qualified for the 2021 Women's U20 World Championship

== Awards ==
- Most valuable player
  (Turkey) İpar Özay Kurt
- Best setter
  (Turkey) Lila Şengün
- Best outside spikers
  (France) Guewe Diouf
  (Belarus) Kseniya Liabiodkina
- Best middle blockers
  (Belarus) Darya Sauchuk
  (Serbia) Hena Kurtagić
- Best opposite spiker
  (Serbia) Vanja Savić
- Best libero
  (Turkey) Gülce Güçtekin

== See also ==
- 2020 Men's U20 Volleyball European Championship
