= Austria women's national under-21 volleyball team =

Youth volleyball team representing Austria

Austria U20
- Association: Austrian Volleyball Federation
- Confederation: CEV

Uniforms
Home	Away	Third

FIVB U21 World Championship
- Appearances: 1 (First in 1985)
- Best result: 13th Place : (1985)

Europe U20 Championship
- Appearances: 4 (First in 1966)
- Best result: 12th place : (1966, 1979, 1990)
- Volleyball Association of Austria

The Austria women's national under-20 volleyball team represents Austria in international women's volleyball competitions and friendly matches under the age 20 and it is ruled by the Austrian Volleyball Federation That is an affiliate of Federation of International Volleyball FIVB and also a part of European Volleyball Confederation CEV.

== Results ==
=== FIVB U20 World Championship ===
Champions Runners up Third place Fourth place

FIVB U20 World Championship
Year	Round	Position	Pld	W	L	SW	SL	Squad
(Brazil) 1977 →	Didn't qualify							
(Mexico) 1981 ←	Didn't qualify							
(Italy) 1985		13th place						Squad
(South Korea) 1987 →	Didn't qualify							
(Belgium) (Netherlands) 2021 ←	Didn't qualify							
Total	0 Titles	1/21						

=== CEV Europe U19 Championship ===
Champions Runners up Third place Fourth place

CEV Europe U19 Championship
Year	Round	Position	Pld	W	L	SW	SL	Squad
(Hungary) 1966		12th place						Squad
(Soviet Union) 1969 →	Didn't qualify							
(Italy) 1971 ←	Didn't qualify							
(Netherlands) 1973		14th place						Squad
(West Germany) 1975 →	Didn't qualify							
(Socialist Federal Republic of Yugoslavia) 1977 ←	Didn't qualify							
(Spain) 1979		12th place						Squad
(West Germany) 1982 →	Didn't qualify							
(Italy) 1988 ←	Didn't qualify							
(Austria) 1990		12th place						Squad
(Greece) 1992 →	Didn't qualify							
(Bosnia and Herzegovina) / (Croatia) 2020 ←	Didn't qualify							
Total	0 Titles	4/26						

== Team ==
=== Current squad ===
The Following players is the Austrian players that Competed in the 2018 Women's U19 Volleyball European Championship Qualifications

#	name	position	height	weight	birthday	spike	block
	bajraktarevic elma	setter	175	62	2001	280	260
	Brindlinger nadia	opposite	174	65	2000	280	265
	Duvnjak andrea	middle-blocker	187	76	2001	297	283
	Epure maria alexandra	libero	172	65	2000	284	265
	Galic anamarija	opposite	200	84	2001	300	284
	Goger viktoria	outside-spiker	177	74	2000	280	263
	Haslinger jasmin	outside-spiker	171	73	2001	280	260
	Kastenberger sarah	libero	172	72	2000	283	265
	Katz daniela	setter	171	227	2000	259	0
	Maros patricia	outside-spiker	175	71	2000	286	272
	Mehic aida	middle-blocker	186	66	2001	301	285
	Messenböck alexandra	setter	175	55	2000	284	271
	Mitter julia	outside-spiker	172	63	2001	290	274
	Oiwoh noemi laureen	middle-blocker	191	79	2001	306	288
	Stockhammer lena	setter	175	78	2001	274	257
	Trathnigg saskia	opposite	178	68	2001	280	265
	Tuluk sema	outside-spiker	180	72	2000	285	261
