= 2006 Women's Junior European Volleyball Championship =

Tournament details
- Host country: France
- Dates: 26 August – 3 September 2006
- Teams: 12
- Venues: 2 (in 2 host cities)

Final positions
- Champions: Italy (4th title)

Tournament awards
- MVP: (Ukraine) Nataliya Goncharova

The 2006 Women's Junior European Volleyball Championship was the 20th edition of the competition, with the main phase (contested between 12 teams) held in France from 22 August to 30 September 2006.

== Qualification ==
Means of qualification		Qualifier
Host country		France
Top three teams from 2004 tournament		Italy
Top three teams from 2004 tournament		Russia
Top three teams from 2004 tournament		Serbia and Montenegro
Qualification Round	Pool A	Croatia
Qualification Round	Pool A	Poland
Qualification Round	Pool B	Ukraine
Qualification Round	Pool B	Belarus
Qualification Round	Pool C	Turkey
Qualification Round	Pool C	Belgium
Qualification Round	Pool D	Czech Republic
Qualification Round	Pool D	Netherlands

== Venues ==
Pool I, final round, classification matches		Pool II	
Saint-Dié-des-Vosges, France	Saint-Dié-des-Vosges is located in France	Metz, France	Metz is located in France
Palais Omnisports Joseph-Claudel	Saint-Dié-des-Vosges is located in France		Metz is located in France
Capacity: 1,100	Saint-Dié-des-Vosges is located in France		Metz is located in France

== Preliminary round ==
=== Pool I ===
Pos	Team	Pld	W	L	Pts	SW	SL	SR	SPW	SPL	SPR	Qualification
1	Italy	5	5	0	10	15	2	7.500	414	304	1.362	Semifinals
2	Croatia	5	4	1	9	13	5	2.600	414	371	1.116	Semifinals
3	Belgium	5	2	3	7	6	9	0.667	312	346	0.902	5th–8th semifinals
4	France	5	2	3	7	7	11	0.636	374	416	0.899	5th–8th semifinals
5	Czech Republic	5	1	4	6	6	12	0.500	377	407	0.926	
6	Belarus	5	1	4	6	4	12	0.333	323	370	0.873	

Date	Time		Score		Set 1	Set 2	Set 3	Set 4	Set 5	Total	Report
26 Aug	15:00	Italy	3–1	Croatia	17–25	25–16	25–16	25–20		92–77	Report
26 Aug	17:30	France	0–3	Belgium	15–25	21–25	23–25			59–75	Report
26 Aug	20:00	Czech Republic	0–3	Belarus	21–25	11–25	21–25			53–75	Report
27 Aug	25:00	Belgium	0–3	Italy	14–25	16–25	22–25			52–75	Report
27 Aug	17:30	Czech Republic	2–3	France	25–22	18–25	21–25	25–16	12–15	101–103	Report
27 Aug	20:00	Belarus	1–3	Croatia	24–26	24–26	25–12	16–25		89–89	Report
28 Aug	15:00	Italy	3–1	Czech Republic	25–22	22–25	25–19	25–19		97–85	Report
28 Aug	17:30	Croatia	3–0	Belgium	25–10	25–22	25–20			75–52	Report
28 Aug	20:00	France	3–0	Belarus	26–24	26–24	25–19			77–67	Report
30 Aug	15:00	Czech Republic	0–3	Croatia	21–25	23–25	17–25			61–75	Report
30 Aug	17:30	Belarus	0–3	Belgium	20–25	16–25	24–26			60–76	Report
30 Aug	20:00	France	0–3	Italy	22–25	19–25	17–25			58–75	Report
31 Aug	15:00	Belgium	0–3	Czech Republic	12–25	20–25	25–27			57–77	Report
31 Aug	17:30	Italy	3–0	Belarus	25–8	25–12	25–12			75–32	Report
31 Aug	20:00	Croatia	3–1	France	25–21	25–18	23–25	25–13		98–77	Report

=== Pool II ===
Pos	Team	Pld	W	L	Pts	SW	SL	SR	SPW	SPL	SPR	Qualification
1	Russia	5	4	1	9	14	5	2.800	449	412	1.090	Semifinals
2	Ukraine	5	4	1	9	14	6	2.333	468	401	1.167	Semifinals
3	Turkey	5	3	2	8	10	8	1.250	394	384	1.026	5th–8th semifinals
4	Serbia and Montenegro	5	3	2	8	9	9	1.000	388	391	0.992	5th–8th semifinals
5	Netherlands	5	1	4	6	7	13	0.538	426	451	0.945	
6	Poland	5	0	5	5	2	15	0.133	335	421	0.796	

Date	Time		Score		Set 1	Set 2	Set 3	Set 4	Set 5	Total	Report
26 Aug	15:00	Ukraine	3–1	Netherlands	19–25	25–17	25–20	26–24		95–86	Report
26 Aug	17:30	Serbia and Montenegro	3–0	Poland	25–16	25–17	25–21			75–54	Report
26 Aug	20:30	Russia	3–1	Turkey	23–25	25–19	25–20	25–23		98–87	Report
27 Aug	25:00	Ukraine	2–3	Serbia and Montenegro	25–14	25–23	26–28	27–29	14–16	117–110	Report
27 Aug	17:30	Netherlands	2–3	Turkey	25–23	15–25	19–25	25–13	14–16	98–102	Report
27 Aug	20:00	Poland	1–3	Russia	23–25	20–25	25–22	18–25		86–97	Report
28 Aug	15:00	Serbia and Montenegro	3–1	Netherlands	25–16	17–25	25–13	25–16		92–70	Report
28 Aug	17:30	Ukraine	3–2	Russia	21–25	25–21	20–25	25–19	15–10	106–100	Report
28 Aug	20:00	Turkey	3–0	Poland	25–21	25–19	25–22			75–62	Report
30 Aug	15:00	Serbia and Montenegro	0–3	Russia	20–25	18–25	22–25			60–75	Report
30 Aug	17:30	Netherlands	3–1	Poland	25–20	26–24	23–25	25–14		99–83	Report
30 Aug	20:00	Ukraine	3–0	Turkey	25–21	25–14	25–20			75–55	Report
31 Aug	15:00	Russia	3–0	Netherlands	25–23	25–23	29–27			79–73	Report
31 Aug	17:30	Turkey	3–0	Serbia and Montenegro	25–19	25–16	25–16			75–51	Report
31 Aug	20:00	Poland	0–3	Ukraine	17–25	22–25	11–25			50–75	Report

== 5th–8th classification ==
Semifinals
2 September
Belgium	0
Serbia and Montenegro	3
2 September
France	1
Turkey	3

5th place match
3 September
Serbia and Montenegro	0
Turkey	3
7th place match
3 September
Belgium	2
France	3

=== 5th–8th semifinals ===
Date	Time		Score		Set 1	Set 2	Set 3	Set 4	Set 5	Total	Report
2 Sep	13:00	Belgium	0–3	Serbia and Montenegro	19–25	22–25	16–25			57–75	Report
2 Sep	15:30	France	1–3	Turkey	18–25	25–22	22–25	12–25		77–97	Report

=== 7th place match ===
Date	Time		Score		Set 1	Set 2	Set 3	Set 4	Set 5	Total	Report
3 Sep	10:30	Belgium	2–3	France	25–19	18–25	14–25	25–22	13–15	95–106	Report

=== 5th place match ===
Date	Time		Score		Set 1	Set 2	Set 3	Set 4	Set 5	Total	Report
3 Sep	13:00	Serbia and Montenegro	0–3	Turkey	21–25	19–25	17–25			57–75	Report

== Final round ==
Semifinals
2 September
Italy	3
Ukraine	0
2 September
Russia	1
Croatia	3

Final
3 September
Italy	3
Croatia	0
3rd place match
3 September
Ukraine	3
Russia	0

=== Semifinals ===
Date	Time		Score		Set 1	Set 2	Set 3	Set 4	Set 5	Total	Report
2 Sep	18:00	Italy	3–0	Ukraine	25–19	25–21	25–17			75–57	Report
2 Sep	20:30	Russia	1–3	Croatia	26–28	22–25	35–33	20–25		103–111	Report

=== 3rd place match ===
Date	Time		Score		Set 1	Set 2	Set 3	Set 4	Set 5	Total	Report
3 Sep	15:30	Ukraine	3–0	Russia	25–23	25–19	27–25			77–67	Report

=== Final ===
Date	Time		Score		Set 1	Set 2	Set 3	Set 4	Set 5	Total	Report
3 Sep	18:00	Italy	3–0	Croatia	25–21	25–20	25–21			75–62	Report

== Final standing ==
Rank	Team
1st place, gold medalist(s)	Italy
2nd place, silver medalist(s)	Croatia
3rd place, bronze medalist(s)	Ukraine
4	Russia
5	Turkey
6	Serbia and Montenegro
7	France
8	Belgium
9	Netherlands
10	Czech Republic
11	Belarus
12	Poland

Qualified for the 2007 Women's U20 World Championship

== Awards ==
- Most valuable player
  (Ukraine) Nataliya Goncharova
- Best scorer
  (Russia) Natalia Dianskaya
- Best server
  (Italy) Lucia Bosetti
- Best blocker
  (Italy) Federica Stufi
- Best setter
  (Italy) Manuela Di Crescenzo
- Best libero
  (Croatia) Paola Došen
- Best receiver
  (Croatia) Matea Ikić
