= 2012 Women's Junior European Volleyball Championship =

Tournament details
- Host country: Turkey
- Dates: August 18 – 26
- Teams: 12
- Venues: 2 (in Ankara host cities)

Final positions
- Champions: Turkey (1st title)

Tournament awards
- MVP: Damla Çakıroğlu (TUR)

The 2012 Women's Junior European Volleyball Championship was played in Ankara, Turkey from August 18 to 26, 2012. Turkey won the championship before Serbia and Italy, and qualified to the 2013 Women's Junior World Championship.

== Participating teams ==
- Host
  - Turkey
- Defending Champion
  - Italy
- Qualified through 2012 Women's Junior European Volleyball Championship Qualification
  - Belgium
  - Bulgaria
  - Czech Republic
  - France
  - Germany
  - Poland
  - Russia
  - Serbia
  - Slovakia
  - Slovenia

== Preliminary round ==
=== Pool A ===
| Pos | Team | Pld | W | L | Pts | SPW | SPL | SPR | SW | SL | SR | Qualification |
|---|---|---|---|---|---|---|---|---|---|---|---|---|
| 1 | Serbia | 5 | 5 | 0 | 15 | 395 | 296 | 1.334 | 15 | 1 | 15.000 | Semifinals |
| 2 | Turkey | 5 | 4 | 1 | 11 | 442 | 381 | 1.160 | 12 | 7 | 1.714 | Semifinals |
| 3 | Slovenia | 5 | 3 | 2 | 9 | 424 | 411 | 1.032 | 11 | 9 | 1.222 | 5th–8th classification |
| 4 | Belgium | 5 | 2 | 3 | 5 | 419 | 444 | 0.944 | 9 | 11 | 0.818 | 5th–8th classification |
| 5 | Slovakia | 5 | 1 | 4 | 4 | 339 | 413 | 0.821 | 5 | 13 | 0.385 | |
| 6 | France | 5 | 0 | 5 | 1 | 372 | 446 | 0.834 | 4 | 15 | 0.267 | |

| Date | | Score | | Set 1 | Set 2 | Set 3 | Set 4 | Set 5 | Total |
|---|---|---|---|---|---|---|---|---|---|
| 18 Aug | Turkey | 3–1 | Belgium | 25–19 | 25–20 | 25–27 | 25–17 | | 100–83 |
| 18 Aug | Slovenia | 3–2 | Slovakia | 25–16 | 21–25 | 21–25 | 25–17 | 15–12 | 107–95 |
| 18 Aug | France | 0–3 | Serbia | 18–25 | 17–25 | 20–25 | | | 55–75 |
| 19 Aug | Belgium | 3–0 | Slovakia | 25–18 | 25–22 | 25–18 | | | 75–52 |
| 19 Aug | Turkey | 3–1 | France | 24–26 | 25–22 | 25–15 | 25–16 | | 99–79 |
| 19 Aug | Serbia | 3–0 | Slovenia | 25–18 | 25–14 | 25–21 | | | 75–53 |
| 20 Aug | France | 2–3 | Belgium | 20–25 | 25–19 | 19–25 | 25–23 | 6–15 | 95–107 |
| 20 Aug | Slovenia | 2–3 | Turkey | 25–23 | 25–17 | 17–25 | 12–25 | 14–16 | 93–106 |
| 20 Aug | Slovakia | 0–3 | Serbia | 20–25 | 13–25 | 12–25 | | | 45–75 |
| 21 Aug | France | 0–3 | Slovenia | 21–25 | 19–25 | 22–25 | | | 62–75 |
| 21 Aug | Belgium | 1–3 | Serbia | 23–25 | 13–25 | 25–20 | 20–25 | | 81–95 |
| 21 Aug | Turkey | 3–0 | Slovakia | 25–21 | 25–17 | 25–13 | | | 75–51 |
| 22 Aug | Slovenia | 3–1 | Belgium | 21–25 | 25–14 | 25–19 | 25–15 | | 96–73 |
| 22 Aug | Slovakia | 3–1 | France | 25–19 | 25–19 | 15–25 | 25–18 | | 90–81 |
| 22 Aug | Serbia | 3–0 | Turkey | 25–22 | 25–19 | 25–21 | | | 75–62 |

=== Pool B ===
| Pos | Team | Pld | W | L | Pts | SPW | SPL | SPR | SW | SL | SR | Qualification |
|---|---|---|---|---|---|---|---|---|---|---|---|---|
| 1 | Russia | 5 | 4 | 1 | 12 | 441 | 388 | 1.137 | 13 | 6 | 2.167 | Semifinals |
| 2 | Italy | 5 | 4 | 1 | 12 | 425 | 361 | 1.177 | 12 | 6 | 2.000 | Semifinals |
| 3 | Poland | 5 | 3 | 2 | 9 | 424 | 409 | 1.037 | 10 | 8 | 1.250 | 5th–8th classification |
| 4 | Germany | 5 | 3 | 2 | 8 | 456 | 432 | 1.056 | 11 | 9 | 1.222 | 5th–8th classification |
| 5 | Czech Republic | 5 | 1 | 4 | 3 | 357 | 435 | 0.821 | 5 | 13 | 0.385 | |
| 6 | Bulgaria | 5 | 0 | 5 | 1 | 424 | 502 | 0.845 | 6 | 15 | 0.400 | |

| Date | | Score | | Set 1 | Set 2 | Set 3 | Set 4 | Set 5 | Total |
|---|---|---|---|---|---|---|---|---|---|
| 18 Aug | Germany | 1–3 | Russia | 19–25 | 25–20 | 17–25 | 19–25 | | 80–95 |
| 18 Aug | Italy | 3–1 | Bulgaria | 19–25 | 25–21 | 25–17 | 25–12 | | 94–75 |
| 18 Aug | Czech Republic | 1–3 | Poland | 25–23 | 22–25 | 22–25 | 15–25 | | 84–98 |
| 19 Aug | Russia | 3–1 | Bulgaria | 21–25 | 25–16 | 25–15 | 25–16 | | 96–72 |
| 19 Aug | Poland | 3–0 | Italy | 27–25 | 25–20 | 25–20 | | | 77–65 |
| 19 Aug | Germany | 3–1 | Czech Republic | 25–27 | 25–16 | 25–12 | 25–18 | | 100–73 |
| 20 Aug | Bulgaria | 1–3 | Poland | 21–25 | 25–23 | 23–25 | 16–25 | | 85–98 |
| 20 Aug | Czech Republic | 0–3 | Russia | 18–25 | 21–25 | 14–25 | | | 53–75 |
| 20 Aug | Italy | 3–1 | Germany | 21–25 | 25–23 | 23–25 | 16–25 | | 85–98 |
| 21 Aug | Russia | 3–1 | Poland | 25–22 | 21–25 | 25–21 | 25–17 | | 96–85 |
| 21 Aug | Czech Republic | 0–3 | Italy | 20–25 | 22–25 | 7–25 | | | 49–75 |
| 21 Aug | Germany | 3–2 | Bulgaria | 23–25 | 25–19 | 25–18 | 23–25 | 20–18 | 116–105 |
| 22 Aug | Poland | 0–3 | Germany | 23–25 | 25–15 | 25–23 | 25–16 | | 98–79 |
| 22 Aug | Bulgaria | 1–3 | Czech Republic | 25–23 | 20–25 | 22–25 | 20–25 | | 87–98 |
| 22 Aug | Italy | 3–1 | Russia | 23–25 | 25–15 | 25–23 | 25–16 | | 98–79 |

== Championship round ==
=== 5th to 8th bracket ===
Semifinals
Slovenia | 0
Germany | 3
Belgium | 1
Poland | 3

Final
Germany | 3
Poland | 1
Third place
Slovenia | 3
Belgium | 0

=== Championship bracket ===
Semifinals
Serbia | 3
Italy | 0
Russia | 2
Turkey | 3

Final
Serbia | 0
Turkey | 3
Third place
Italy | 3
Russia | 0

=== Classification 5th to 8th ===
| Date | | Score | | Set 1 | Set 2 | Set 3 | Set 4 | Set 5 | Total |
|---|---|---|---|---|---|---|---|---|---|
| 25 Aug | Slovenia | 0–3 | Germany | 17-25 | 23-25 | 21-25 | | | 61-75 |
| 25 Aug | Belgium | 1–3 | Poland | 17-25 | 21-25 | 25-19 | 22-25 | | 85-94 |

=== Semifinals ===
| Date | | Score | | Set 1 | Set 2 | Set 3 | Set 4 | Set 5 | Total |
|---|---|---|---|---|---|---|---|---|---|
| 25 Aug | Serbia | 3–0 | Italy | 25-23 | 25-19 | 26-24 | | | 76-66 |
| 25 Aug | Russia | 2–3 | Turkey | 25-18 | 23-25 | 25-23 | 23-25 | 6-15 | 102-106 |

=== 7th place match ===
| Date | | Score | | Set 1 | Set 2 | Set 3 | Set 4 | Set 5 | Total |
|---|---|---|---|---|---|---|---|---|---|
| 26 Aug | Slovenia | 3–0 | Belgium | 27–25 | 25–18 | 27–25 | | | 79–68 |

=== 5th place match ===
| Date | | Score | | Set 1 | Set 2 | Set 3 | Set 4 | Set 5 | Total |
|---|---|---|---|---|---|---|---|---|---|
| 26 Aug | Germany | 3–1 | Poland | 25–23 | 25–18 | 17–25 | 25–23 | | 92–89 |

=== 3rd place match ===
| Date | | Score | | Set 1 | Set 2 | Set 3 | Set 4 | Set 5 | Total |
|---|---|---|---|---|---|---|---|---|---|
| 26 Aug | Italy | 3–0 | Russia | 25–20 | 25–23 | 25–21 | | | 75–64 |

=== Final ===
| Date | | Score | | Set 1 | Set 2 | Set 3 | Set 4 | Set 5 | Total |
|---|---|---|---|---|---|---|---|---|---|
| 26 Aug | Serbia | 0–3 | Turkey | 21–25 | 22–25 | 18–25 | | | 61–75 |

== Final standing ==
| Rank | Team |
|---|---|
| 1st place, gold medalist(s) | Turkey |
| 2nd place, silver medalist(s) | Serbia |
| 3rd place, bronze medalist(s) | Italy |
| 4 | Russia |
| 5 | Germany |
| 6 | Poland |
| 7 | Slovenia |
| 8 | Belgium |
| 9 | Slovakia |
| 10 | Czech Republic |
| 11 | Bulgaria |
| 12 | France |

| Qualified for the 2013 World Junior Championship |

2012 Women's Junior European champions

Turkey
1st title

Team Roster
Damla Çakıroğlu, Çağla Akın, Kübra Akman, Şeyma Ercan, Ceylan Arısan, Ceyda Aktaş, Aslı Kalaç, Ece Hocaoğlu, Kübra Kegan, Ecem Alıcı, Dilara Bağcı, Didem Marangoz
Head Coach: Gökhan Edman

== Individual awards ==
- MVP: (Turkey) Damla Çakıroğlu
- Best spiker: (Germany) Lisa Izquierdo
- Best server: (Russia) Kseniia Ilchenko
- Best blocker: (Serbia) Mina Popovic
- Best receiver: (Italy) Elena Perinelli
- Best setter: (Serbia) Sladjana Mirkovic
- Best libero: (Turkey) Dilara Bağcı
- Best scorer: (Russia) Irina Voronkova
