= 2002 Women's Junior European Volleyball Championship =

Tournament details
- Host country: Croatia
- Dates: 17 – 25 August 2002
- Teams: 12
- Venues: 2 (in 1 host city)

Final positions
- Champions: Poland (1st title)

The 2002 Women's Junior European Volleyball Championship was the 18th edition of the competition, with the main phase (contested between 12 teams) held in Croatia from 17 to 25 August 2002.

== Qualification ==
| Means of qualification | | Qualifier |
|---|---|---|
| Host Country | | Croatia |
| Top three teams from 2000 tournament | | Czech Republic |
| Top three teams from 2000 tournament | | Italy |
| Top three teams from 2000 tournament | | Poland |
| Qualification Round | Pool A | Russia |
| Qualification Round | Pool A | Netherlands |
| Qualification Round | Pool B | Germany |
| Qualification Round | Pool B | Ukraine |
| Qualification Round | Pool C | France |
| Qualification Round | Pool C | Hungary |
| Qualification Round | Pool D | Belarus |
| Qualification Round | Pool D | Turkey |

== Venues ==
| Zagreb, Croatia | Zagreb is located in Croatia |
| Zrinjevac Sport Hall | Zagreb is located in Croatia |
| Capacity: 1,160 | Zagreb is located in Croatia |

== Preliminary round ==
=== Pool I ===
| Pos | Team | Pld | W | L | Pts | SW | SL | SR | SPW | SPL | SPR | Qualification |
|---|---|---|---|---|---|---|---|---|---|---|---|---|
| 1 | Ukraine | 5 | 5 | 0 | 10 | 15 | 5 | 3.000 | 479 | 364 | 1.316 | Semifinals |
| 2 | Belarus | 5 | 4 | 1 | 9 | 13 | 5 | 2.600 | 426 | 371 | 1.148 | Semifinals |
| 3 | Italy | 5 | 3 | 2 | 8 | 10 | 6 | 1.667 | 355 | 331 | 1.073 | 5th–8th semifinals |
| 4 | Russia | 5 | 2 | 3 | 7 | 8 | 10 | 0.800 | 398 | 393 | 1.013 | 5th–8th semifinals |
| 5 | Croatia | 5 | 1 | 4 | 6 | 6 | 13 | 0.462 | 382 | 459 | 0.832 | 9th–12th semifinals |
| 6 | Hungary | 5 | 0 | 5 | 5 | 2 | 15 | 0.133 | 301 | 423 | 0.712 | 9th–12th semifinals |

| Date | Time | | Score | | Set 1 | Set 2 | Set 3 | Set 4 | Set 5 | Total | Report |
|---|---|---|---|---|---|---|---|---|---|---|---|
| 17 Aug | 15:00 | Ukraine | 3–2 | Russia | 25–18 | 26–28 | 21–25 | 25–13 | 15–11 | 112–95 | Report |
| 17 Aug | 17:30 | Italy | 0–3 | Belarus | 22–25 | 14–25 | 19–25 | | | 55–75 | Report |
| 17 Aug | 20:30 | Croatia | 3–1 | Hungary | 25–22 | 25–23 | 19–25 | 25–19 | | 94–89 | Report |
| 18 Aug | 15:00 | Ukraine | 3–1 | Italy | 25–9 | 22–25 | 25–18 | 25–23 | | 97–75 | Report |
| 18 Aug | 17:30 | Russia | 3–0 | Hungary | 25–23 | 25–17 | 25–10 | | | 75–50 | Report |
| 18 Aug | 20:00 | Belarus | 3–1 | Croatia | 25–20 | 25–18 | 25–27 | 25–16 | | 100–81 | Report |
| 19 Aug | 15:00 | Italy | 3–0 | Russia | 25–21 | 25–19 | 25–23 | | | 75–63 | Report |
| 19 Aug | 17:30 | Hungary | 1–3 | Belarus | 31–29 | 11–25 | 14–25 | 14–25 | | 70–104 | Report |
| 19 Aug | 20:00 | Croatia | 1–3 | Ukraine | 25–22 | 17–25 | 18–25 | 19–25 | | 79–97 | Report |
| 21 Aug | 15:00 | Russia | 0–3 | Belarus | 23–25 | 20–25 | 24–26 | | | 67–76 | Report |
| 21 Aug | 17:30 | Ukraine | 3–0 | Hungary | 25–16 | 25–13 | 25–15 | | | 75–44 | Report |
| 21 Aug | 20:00 | Italy | 3–0 | Croatia | 25–16 | 25–13 | 25–19 | | | 75–48 | Report |
| 22 Aug | 15:00 | Belarus | 1–3 | Ukraine | 25–23 | 14–25 | 16–25 | 16–25 | | 71–98 | Report |
| 22 Aug | 17:30 | Hungary | 0–3 | Italy | 16–25 | 21–25 | 11–25 | | | 48–75 | Report |
| 22 Aug | 20:00 | Croatia | 1–3 | Russia | 25–23 | 20–25 | 20–25 | 15–25 | | 80–98 | Report |

=== Pool II ===
| Pos | Team | Pld | W | L | Pts | SW | SL | SR | SPW | SPL | SPR | Qualification |
|---|---|---|---|---|---|---|---|---|---|---|---|---|
| 1 | Poland | 5 | 5 | 0 | 10 | 15 | 4 | 3.750 | 437 | 359 | 1.217 | Semifinals |
| 2 | Netherlands | 5 | 4 | 1 | 9 | 14 | 6 | 2.333 | 462 | 433 | 1.067 | Semifinals |
| 3 | Germany | 5 | 2 | 3 | 7 | 8 | 10 | 0.800 | 414 | 391 | 1.059 | 5th–8th semifinals |
| 4 | Turkey | 5 | 2 | 3 | 7 | 7 | 9 | 0.778 | 353 | 366 | 0.964 | 5th–8th semifinals |
| 5 | Czech Republic | 5 | 2 | 3 | 7 | 10 | 13 | 0.769 | 477 | 496 | 0.962 | 9th–12th semifinals |
| 6 | France | 5 | 0 | 5 | 5 | 3 | 15 | 0.200 | 343 | 441 | 0.778 | 9th–12th semifinals |

| Date | Time | | Score | | Set 1 | Set 2 | Set 3 | Set 4 | Set 5 | Total | Report |
|---|---|---|---|---|---|---|---|---|---|---|---|
| 17 Aug | 15:00 | Germany | 0–3 | Netherlands | 25–27 | 25–27 | 20–25 | | | 70–79 | Report |
| 17 Aug | 17:30 | Turkey | 0–3 | Poland | 22–25 | 20–25 | 23–25 | | | 65–75 | Report |
| 17 Aug | 21:00 | Czech Republic | 3–2 | France | 25–27 | 25–15 | 25–21 | 21–25 | 15–9 | 111–97 | Report |
| 18 Aug | 15:00 | Netherlands | 2–3 | Poland | 23–25 | 18–25 | 25–21 | 25–20 | 8–15 | 99–106 | Report |
| 18 Aug | 17:30 | France | 0–3 | Turkey | 22–25 | 18–25 | 16–25 | | | 56–75 | Report |
| 18 Aug | 20:00 | Germany | 2–3 | Czech Republic | 28–26 | 25–16 | 22–25 | 18–25 | 13–15 | 106–107 | Report |
| 19 Aug | 15:00 | Poland | 3–0 | France | 25–15 | 25–15 | 25–9 | | | 75–39 | Report |
| 19 Aug | 17:30 | Turkey | 1–3 | Germany | 18–25 | 26–24 | 18–25 | 14–25 | | 76–99 | Report |
| 19 Aug | 20:00 | Czech Republic | 2–3 | Netherlands | 25–20 | 27–25 | 21–25 | 17–25 | 10–15 | 100–110 | Report |
| 21 Aug | 15:00 | Germany | 0–3 | Poland | 20–25 | 19–25 | 19–25 | | | 58–75 | Report |
| 21 Aug | 17:30 | Netherlands | 3–1 | France | 26–24 | 20–25 | 26–24 | 27–25 | | 99–98 | Report |
| 21 Aug | 20:00 | Czech Republic | 0–3 | Turkey | 19–25 | 17–25 | 25–27 | | | 61–77 | Report |
| 22 Aug | 15:00 | France | 0–3 | Germany | 15–25 | 9–25 | 29–31 | | | 53–81 | Report |
| 22 Aug | 17:30 | Poland | 3–2 | Czech Republic | 25–19 | 23–25 | 18–25 | 25–17 | 15–12 | 106–98 | Report |
| 22 Aug | 20:00 | Turkey | 0–3 | Netherlands | 22–25 | 21–25 | 16–25 | | | 59–75 | Report |

== 9th–12th classification ==
Semifinals
24 August
Croatia | 1
France | 3
24 August
Hungary | 1
Czech Republic | 3

9th place match
25 August
France | 3
Czech Republic | 0
11th place match
25 August
Croatia | 3
Hungary | 0

=== 9th–12th semifinals ===
| Date | Time | | Score | | Set 1 | Set 2 | Set 3 | Set 4 | Set 5 | Total | Report |
|---|---|---|---|---|---|---|---|---|---|---|---|
| 24 Aug | 15:00 | Croatia | 1–3 | France | 21–25 | 25–23 | 13–25 | 20–25 | | 79–98 | Report |
| 24 Aug | 17:30 | Hungary | 1–3 | Czech Republic | 26–24 | 19–25 | 18–25 | 14–25 | | 77–99 | Report |

=== 11th place match ===
| Date | Time | | Score | | Set 1 | Set 2 | Set 3 | Set 4 | Set 5 | Total | Report |
|---|---|---|---|---|---|---|---|---|---|---|---|
| 25 Aug | 11:30 | Croatia | 3–0 | Hungary | 25–19 | 25–18 | 25–22 | | | 75–59 | Report |

=== 9th place match ===
| Date | Time | | Score | | Set 1 | Set 2 | Set 3 | Set 4 | Set 5 | Total | Report |
|---|---|---|---|---|---|---|---|---|---|---|---|
| 25 Aug | 14:00 | France | 3–0 | Czech Republic | 25–21 | 25–15 | 25–17 | | | 75–53 | Report |

== 5th–8th classification ==
Semifinals
24 August
Italy | 2
Turkey | 3
24 August
Russia | 3
Germany | 1

5th place match
25 August
Turkey | 3
Russia | 1
7th place match
25 August
Italy | 3
Germany | 0

=== 5th–8th semifinals ===
| Date | Time | | Score | | Set 1 | Set 2 | Set 3 | Set 4 | Set 5 | Total | Report |
|---|---|---|---|---|---|---|---|---|---|---|---|
| 24 Aug | 12:30 | Italy | 2–3 | Turkey | 25–11 | 25–19 | 18–25 | 25–27 | 20–22 | 113–104 | Report |
| 24 Aug | 15:00 | Russia | 3–1 | Germany | 19–25 | 25–22 | 25–15 | 25–21 | | 94–83 | Report |

=== 7th place match ===
| Date | Time | | Score | | Set 1 | Set 2 | Set 3 | Set 4 | Set 5 | Total | Report |
|---|---|---|---|---|---|---|---|---|---|---|---|
| 25 Aug | 11:30 | Italy | 3–0 | Germany | 25–17 | 25–19 | 25–20 | | | 75–56 | Report |

=== 5th place match ===
| Date | Time | | Score | | Set 1 | Set 2 | Set 3 | Set 4 | Set 5 | Total | Report |
|---|---|---|---|---|---|---|---|---|---|---|---|
| 25 Aug | 14:00 | Turkey | 3–1 | Russia | 23–25 | 25–17 | 25–20 | 25–21 | | 98–83 | Report |

== Final round ==
Semifinals
24 August
Ukraine | 3
Netherlands | 0
24 August
Belarus | 2
Poland | 3

Final
25 August
Ukraine | 0
Poland | 3
3rd place match
25 August
Netherlands | 0
Belarus | 3

=== Semifinals ===
| Date | Time | | Score | | Set 1 | Set 2 | Set 3 | Set 4 | Set 5 | Total | Report |
|---|---|---|---|---|---|---|---|---|---|---|---|
| 24 Aug | 17:30 | Ukraine | 3–0 | Netherlands | 25–23 | 25–21 | 25–16 | | | 75–60 | Report |
| 24 Aug | 20:00 | Belarus | 2–3 | Poland | 25–19 | 25–20 | 19–25 | 20–25 | 11–15 | 100–104 | Report |

=== 3rd place match ===
| Date | Time | | Score | | Set 1 | Set 2 | Set 3 | Set 4 | Set 5 | Total | Report |
|---|---|---|---|---|---|---|---|---|---|---|---|
| 25 Aug | 16:30 | Netherlands | 0–3 | Belarus | 16–25 | 18–25 | 20–25 | | | 54–75 | Report |

=== Final ===
| Date | Time | | Score | | Set 1 | Set 2 | Set 3 | Set 4 | Set 5 | Total | Report |
|---|---|---|---|---|---|---|---|---|---|---|---|
| 25 Aug | 19:00 | Ukraine | 0–3 | Poland | 25–27 | 16–25 | 19–25 | | | 60–77 | Report |

== Final standing ==
| Rank | Team |
|---|---|
| 1st place, gold medalist(s) | Poland |
| 2nd place, silver medalist(s) | Ukraine |
| 3rd place, bronze medalist(s) | Belarus |
| 4 | Netherlands |
| 5 | Turkey |
| 6 | Russia |
| 7 | Italy |
| 8 | Germany |
| 9 | France |
| 10 | Czech Republic |
| 11 | Croatia |
| 12 | Hungary |

| Qualified for the 2003 Women's U20 World Championship |
