= 2018 Women's U19 Volleyball European Championship =

Tournament details
- Host country: Albania
- Dates: 1–9 September
- Teams: 12
- Venues: 2 (in 2 host cities)

Final positions
- Champions: Italy (7th title)

Tournament awards
- MVP: (Italy) Valeria Battista

The 2018 Women's Junior European Volleyball Championship was the 26th edition of the competition, with the main phase (contested between 12 teams) held in Albania from 1 to 9 September 2018.

== Participating teams ==
- Hosts
  - Albania
- Qualified through 2018 Women's U19 Volleyball European Championship Qualification
  - Belarus
  - Bulgaria
  - France
  - Germany
  - Italy
  - Netherlands
  - Poland
  - Russia
  - Serbia
  - Slovakia
  - Turkey

== Preliminary round ==
All times are Central European Summer Time (UTC+02:00).

=== Pool I ===
- venue: Dhimitrag Goga Sport Hall, Durrës

Pos	Team	Pld	W	L	Pts	SW	SL	SR	SPW	SPL	SPR	Qualification
1	Italy	5	5	0	15	15	2	7.500	420	327	1.284	Semifinals
2	Poland	5	4	1	12	12	3	4.000	360	271	1.328	Semifinals
3	Belarus	5	3	2	9	10	7	1.429	385	357	1.078	5th–8th semifinals
4	Netherlands	5	2	3	6	6	10	0.600	343	353	0.972	5th–8th semifinals
5	Bulgaria	5	1	4	3	6	12	0.500	376	421	0.893	
6	Albania	5	0	5	0	0	15	0.000	220	375	0.587	

Date	Time		Score		Set 1	Set 2	Set 3	Set 4	Set 5	Total	Report
1 Sep	15:00	Albania	0–3	Netherlands	11–25	13–25	15–25			39–75	Report
1 Sep	17:30	Poland	3–0	Bulgaria	25–23	25–18	25–22			75–63	Report
1 Sep	20:00	Belarus	1–3	Italy	17–25	20–25	25–20	18–25		80–95	Report
2 Sep	15:00	Netherlands	3–1	Bulgaria	25–16	25–22	22–25	25–23		97–86	Report
2 Sep	17:30	Albania	0–3	Belarus	15–25	21–25	13–25			49–75	Report
2 Sep	20:00	Italy	3–0	Poland	25–21	29–27	25–12			79–60	Report
3 Sep	15:00	Belarus	3–0	Netherlands	25–16	25–22	26–24			76–62	Report
3 Sep	17:30	Poland	3–0	Albania	25–13	25–6	25–9			75–28	Report
3 Sep	20:00	Bulgaria	1–3	Italy	11–25	25–19	20–25	20–25		76–94	Report
5 Sep	15:00	Belarus	0–3	Poland	23–25	15–25	19–25			57–75	Report
5 Sep	17:30	Albania	0–3	Bulgaria	19–25	18–25	21–25			58–75	Report
5 Sep	20:00	Netherlands	0–3	Italy	21–25	19–25	25–27			65–77	Report
6 Sep	15:00	Bulgaria	1–3	Belarus	20–25	16–25	25–22	15–25		76–97	Report
6 Sep	17:30	Italy	3–0	Albania	25–13	25–14	25–19			75–46	Report
6 Sep	20:00	Poland	3–0	Netherlands	25–14	25–12	25–18			75–44	Report

=== Pool II ===
- venue: Olympic Park, Tirana

Pos	Team	Pld	W	L	Pts	SW	SL	SR	SPW	SPL	SPR	Qualification
1	Russia	5	5	0	15	15	2	7.500	415	312	1.330	Semifinals
2	Turkey	5	3	2	10	12	7	1.714	433	394	1.099	Semifinals
3	Serbia	5	3	2	9	10	7	1.429	387	367	1.054	5th–8th semifinals
4	Germany	5	3	2	7	10	10	1.000	421	407	1.034	5th–8th semifinals
5	Slovakia	5	1	4	3	3	13	0.231	289	377	0.767	
6	France	5	0	5	1	4	15	0.267	351	439	0.800	

Date	Time		Score		Set 1	Set 2	Set 3	Set 4	Set 5	Total	Report
1 Sep	15:00	Turkey	2–3	Germany	22–25	21–25	25–22	25–23	10–15	103–110	Report
1 Sep	17:30	Russia	3–0	Serbia	26–24	25–21	25–17			76–62	Report
1 Sep	20:00	Slovakia	3–1	France	25–12	25–14	12–25	25–21		87–72	Report
2 Sep	15:00	Germany	1–3	Serbia	16–25	25–14	19–25	23–25		83–89	Report
2 Sep	17:30	Turkey	3–0	Slovakia	25–11	25–17	28–26			78–54	Report
2 Sep	20:00	France	1–3	Russia	25–23	20–25	21–25	12–25		78–98	Report
3 Sep	15:00	Slovakia	0–3	Germany	14–25	17–25	14–25			45–75	Report
3 Sep	17:30	Russia	3–1	Turkey	25–23	25–12	16–25	25–20		91–80	Report
3 Sep	20:00	Serbia	3–0	France	25–20	25–11	25–20			75–51	Report
5 Sep	15:00	Slovakia	0–3	Russia	19–25	12–25	12–25			43–75	Report
5 Sep	17:30	Turkey	3–1	Serbia	22–25	25–17	25–21	25–21		97–84	Report
5 Sep	20:00	Germany	3–2	France	25–19	20–25	25–14	19–25	15–12	104–95	Report
6 Sep	15:00	Serbia	3–0	Slovakia	25–16	25–19	27–25			77–60	Report
6 Sep	17:30	France	0–3	Turkey	20–25	18–25	17–25			55–75	Report
6 Sep	20:00	Russia	3–0	Germany	25–16	25–19	25–14			75–49	Report

== 5th–8th classification ==
All times are Central European Summer Time (UTC+02:00).

- venue: Dhimitrag Goga Sport Hall, Durrës

Semifinals
8 September
Belarus	1
Germany	3
8 September
Netherlands	1
Serbia	3

5th place match
9 September
Germany	1
Serbia	3
7th place match
9 September
Belarus	2
Netherlands	3

=== 5th–8th semifinals ===
Date	Time		Score		Set 1	Set 2	Set 3	Set 4	Set 5	Total	Report
8 Sep	16:00	Belarus	1–3	Germany	18–25	19–25	25–16	20–25		82–91	Report
8 Sep	18:30	Netherlands	1–3	Serbia	19–25	18–25	26–24	14–25		77–99	Report

=== 7th place match ===
Date	Time		Score		Set 1	Set 2	Set 3	Set 4	Set 5	Total	Report
9 Sep	15:00	Belarus	2–3	Netherlands	17–25	25–18	25–20	16–25	8–15	91–103	Report

=== 5th place match ===
Date	Time		Score		Set 1	Set 2	Set 3	Set 4	Set 5	Total	Report
9 Sep	17:30	Germany	1–3	Serbia	23–25	25–18	22–25	16–25		86–93	Report

== Final round ==
All times are Central European Summer Time (UTC+02:00).

- venue: Olympic Park, Tirana

Semifinals
8 September
Italy	3
Turkey	1
8 September
Russia	3
Poland	2

Final
9 September
Italy	3
Russia	2
3rd place match
9 September
Turkey	2
Poland	3

=== Semifinals ===
Date	Time		Score		Set 1	Set 2	Set 3	Set 4	Set 5	Total	Report
8 Sep	16:00	Italy	3–1	Turkey	25–15	10–25	25–22	25–22		85–84	Report
8 Sep	18:30	Russia	3–2	Poland	19–25	25–19	25–22	19–25	17–15	105–106	Report

=== 3rd place match ===
Date	Time		Score		Set 1	Set 2	Set 3	Set 4	Set 5	Total	Report
9 Sep	16:30	Turkey	2–3	Poland	21–25	25–17	25–15	20–25	12–15	103–97	Report

=== Final ===
Date	Time		Score		Set 1	Set 2	Set 3	Set 4	Set 5	Total	Report
9 Sep	19:00	Italy	3–2	Russia	24–26	18–25	26–24	25–22	15–9	108–106	Report

== Final standing ==
Rank	Team
1st place, gold medalist(s)	Italy
2nd place, silver medalist(s)	Russia
3rd place, bronze medalist(s)	Poland
4	Turkey
5	Serbia
6	Germany
7	Netherlands
8	Belarus
9	Bulgaria
10	Slovakia
11	France
12	Albania

Qualified for the 2019 Women's U20 World Championship

== Awards ==
- Most valuable player
  (Italy) Valeria Battista
- Best setter
  (Russia) Polina Matveeva
- Best outside spikers
  (Poland) Oliwia Bałuk
  (Turkey) Derya Cebecioğlu
- Best middle blockers
  (Russia) Viktoriia Pushina
  (Italy) Sarah Luisa Fahr
- Best opposite spiker
  (Poland) Magdalena Stysiak
- Best libero
  (Italy) Sara Panetoni

Source: CEV

== See also ==
- 2018 Men's U20 Volleyball European Championship
