= 1995 FIVB Volleyball Women's U20 World Championship =

1995 FIVB Women's U20 World Championship
Tournament details
- Host country: Thailand
- Dates: July 24–30, 1995
- Teams: 16
- Venue: 1 (in Bangkok host cities)

Final positions
- Champions: China (1st title)

Tournament awards
- MVP: (China) Zhang Jinwen

The 1995 FIVB Women's U20 World Championship was held in Bangkok, Thailand from July 24 to 30, 1995. 16 teams participated in the tournament. This tournament had to be played at Bangkok, Thailand.

== Qualification process ==
Confederation	Method of Qualification	Date	Venue	Vacancies	Qualified
FIVB	Host			1	Thailand
NORCECA	NORCECA Election			2	Cuba; Dominican Republic
CEV	1994 European Junior Championship	September 2–10, 1994	Debrecen, Hungary	5	Russia; Italy; Germany; Netherlands; Poland*
AVC	1994 Asian Junior Championship		Manila, Philippines	4	China; Japan; South Korea; Chinese Taipei
CSV	1994 South American Junior Championship	November 7–12, 1994	Medellín, Colombia	2	Brazil; Peru**
CAVB	African Election			1	Tunisia
FIVB	Wild card			1	Romania
Total				16	

- * Poland replaced Croatia.
- ** Peru replaced Argentina.

== Pools composition ==
Pool A	Pool B	Pool C	Pool D
Thailand; Dominican Republic; Germany; Netherlands	Cuba; South Korea; Italy; Tunisia	Japan; Peru; Russia; Romania	Brazil; China; Chinese Taipei; Poland

== Preliminary round ==
=== Pool A ===
Pos	Team	Pld	W	L	Pts	SW	SL	SR	SPW	SPL	SPR	Qualification
1	Germany	3	3	0	6	9	1	9.000	150	110	1.364	Seeding group
2	Netherlands	3	2	1	5	7	3	2.333	141	102	1.382	Elimination group
3	Dominican Republic	3	1	2	4	3	6	0.500	99	124	0.798	Elimination group
4	Thailand	3	0	3	3	0	9	0.000	82	136	0.603	Eliminated

Date		Score		Set 1	Set 2	Set 3	Set 4	Set 5	Total
23 Jul	Dominican Republic	3–0	Thailand	15–13	15–11	15–10			45–34
23 Jul	Germany	3–1	Netherlands	12–15	15–10	17–16	15–10		59–51
24 Jul	Netherlands	3–0	Dominican Republic	15–12	15–4	15–10			45–26
24 Jul	Germany	3–0	Thailand	15–7	16–14	15–10			46–31
25 Jul	Germany	3–0	Dominican Republic	15–6	15–13	15–9			45–28
25 Jul	Netherlands	3–0	Thailand	15–5	15–5	15–7			45–17

=== Pool B ===
Pos	Team	Pld	W	L	Pts	SW	SL	SR	SPW	SPL	SPR	Qualification
1	South Korea	3	3	0	6	9	3	3.000	174	112	1.554	Seeding group
2	Italy	3	2	1	5	7	4	1.750	149	105	1.419	Elimination group
3	Cuba	3	1	2	4	6	6	1.000	141	141	1.000	Elimination group
4	Tunisia	3	0	3	3	0	9	0.000	29	135	0.215	Eliminated

Date		Score		Set 1	Set 2	Set 3	Set 4	Set 5	Total
23 Jul	Italy	3–1	Cuba	15–2	11–15	15–9	15–11		56–37
23 Jul	South Korea	3–0	Tunisia	15–2	15–3	15–0			45–5
24 Jul	South Korea	3–2	Cuba	15–9	11–15	15–9	14–16	15–10	70–59
24 Jul	Italy	3–0	Tunisia	15–3	15–3	15–3			45–9
25 Jul	South Korea	3–1	Italy	17–16	7–15	15–10	15–7		59–48
25 Jul	Cuba	3–0	Tunisia	15–7	15–4	15–4			45–15

=== Pool C ===
Pos	Team	Pld	W	L	Pts	SW	SL	SR	SPW	SPL	SPR	Qualification
1	Russia	3	3	0	6	9	2	4.500	155	80	1.938	Seeding group
2	Japan	3	2	1	5	8	3	2.667	146	112	1.304	Elimination group
3	Peru	3	1	2	4	3	6	0.500	95	116	0.819	Elimination group
4	Romania	3	0	3	3	0	9	0.000	47	135	0.348	Eliminated

Date		Score		Set 1	Set 2	Set 3	Set 4	Set 5	Total
23 Jul	Russia	3–0	Romania	15–0	15–4	15–10			45–14
23 Jul	Japan	3–0	Peru	15–10	16–14	16–14			47–38
24 Jul	Russia	3–0	Peru	15–6	15–3	15–3			45–12
24 Jul	Japan	3–0	Romania	15–3	15–6	15–0			45–9
25 Jul	Peru	3–0	Romania	15–12	15–9	15–3			45–24
25 Jul	Russia	3–2	Japan	15–9	9–15	11–15	15–5	15–10	65–54

=== Pool D ===
Pos	Team	Pld	W	L	Pts	SW	SL	SR	SPW	SPL	SPR	Qualification
1	China	3	3	0	6	9	2	4.500	167	108	1.546	Seeding group
2	Brazil	3	2	1	5	8	4	2.000	175	139	1.259	Elimination group
3	Poland	3	1	2	4	4	6	0.667	100	125	0.800	Elimination group
4	Chinese Taipei	3	0	3	3	0	9	0.000	65	135	0.481	Eliminated

Date		Score		Set 1	Set 2	Set 3	Set 4	Set 5	Total
23 Jul	China	3–2	Brazil	15–10	9–15	15–9	14–6	24–22	77–72
23 Jul	Poland	3–0	Chinese Taipei	15–9	15–10	15–3			45–22
24 Jul	China	3–0	Poland	15–5	15–5	15–9			45–19
24 Jul	Brazil	3–0	Chinese Taipei	15–4	15–13	15–9			45–26
25 Jul	Brazil	3–1	Poland	15–5	13–15	15–11	15–5		58–36
25 Jul	China	3–0	Chinese Taipei	15–2	15–6	15–9			45–17

== Second round ==
=== Play off – elimination group ===
Date		Score		Set 1	Set 2	Set 3	Set 4	Set 5	Total
26 Jul	Italy	3–1	Poland	15–7	15–9	8–15	15–5		53–36
26 Jul	Netherlands	3–1	Peru	15–5	7–15	15–12	15–13		52–45
26 Jul	Brazil	3–0	Dominican Republic	15–1	15–9	15–6			45–16
26 Jul	Japan	3–0	Cuba	15–7	15–8	15–12			45–27

=== Play off – seeding group ===
Date		Score		Set 1	Set 2	Set 3	Set 4	Set 5	Total
26 Jul	Russia	3–0	Germany	15–2	15–12	15–8			45–22
26 Jul	China	3–0	South Korea	15–3	15–6	15–6			45–15

== Final round ==
Quarterfinals
July 28 – Bangkok
China	3
Italy	0
July 28 – Bangkok
Japan	3
Germany	1
July 28 – Bangkok
Brazil	3
South Korea	2
July 28 – Bangkok
Russia	3
Netherlands	0

Semifinals
July 29 – Bangkok
China	3
Japan	0
July 29 – Bangkok
Brazil	3
Russia	2

Final
July 29 – Bangkok
China	3
Brazil	0
3rd place
July 29 – Bangkok
Japan	0
Russia	3

5th–8th places
July 29 – Bangkok
Netherlands	3
South Korea	0
July 29 – Bangkok
Italy	3
Germany	0

5th place
July 30 – Bangkok
Netherlands	3
Italy	2
7th place
July 30 – Bangkok
South Korea	3
Germany	1

=== Quarterfinals ===
Date		Score		Set 1	Set 2	Set 3	Set 4	Set 5	Total
Jul 28	China	3–0	Italy	15–7	15–9	15–9			45–25
Jul 28	Japan	3–1	Germany	15–8	14–16	15–10	15–7		59–41
Jul 28	Brazil	3–2	South Korea	15–12	10–15	11–15	15–8	15–13	66–63
Jul 28	Russia	3–0	Netherlands	15–8	15–4	25–10			45–22

=== 5th–8th semifinals ===
Date		Score		Set 1	Set 2	Set 3	Set 4	Set 5	Total
Jul 29	Netherlands	3–0	South Korea	15–3	15–9	16–14			46–26
Jul 29	Italy	3–0	Germany	16–14	15–8	15–10			46–32

=== Semifinals ===
Date		Score		Set 1	Set 2	Set 3	Set 4	Set 5	Total
Jul 29	China	3–0	Japan	15–12	15–10	15–13			45–35
Jul 29	Brazil	3–2	Russia	2–15	15–10	15–0	6–15	15–6	53–46

=== 7th place ===
Date		Score		Set 1	Set 2	Set 3	Set 4	Set 5	Total
Jul 30	South Korea	3–1	Germany	15–5	12–15	15–9	15–11		57–40

=== 5th place ===
Date		Score		Set 1	Set 2	Set 3	Set 4	Set 5	Total
Jul 30	Netherlands	3–2	Italy	15–13	13–15	8–15	15–8	15–12	66–63

=== 3rd place ===
Date		Score		Set 1	Set 2	Set 3	Set 4	Set 5	Total
Jul 30	Russia	3–0	Japan	16–14	15–4	15–11			46–29

=== Final ===
Date		Score		Set 1	Set 2	Set 3	Set 4	Set 5	Total
Jul 30	China	3–0	Brazil	16–14	15–12	15–2			46–28

== Final standing ==
Rank	Team
1st place, gold medalist(s)	China
2nd place, silver medalist(s)	Brazil
3rd place, bronze medalist(s)	Russia
4	Japan
5	Netherlands
6	Italy
7	South Korea
8	Germany
9	Cuba
9	Dominican Republic
9	Peru
9	Poland
13	Chinese Taipei
13	Romania
13	Thailand
13	Tunisia

1995 FIVB Women's Junior World champions

China
1st title

== Individual awards ==
- MVP: (China) Zhang Jinwen
- Best scorer: (Brazil) Valeska Menezes
- Best spiker: (Brazil) Valeska Menezes
- Best blocker: (Russia) Elena Godina
- Best server: (Netherlands) Elles Leferink
