= 2023 FIVB Volleyball Women's U21 World Championship =

22nd edition of the FIVB Volleyball Women's U21 World Championship

Campeonato Mundial de Voleibol Femenino Sub-21 de 2023

Tournament details
- Host country: Mexico
- Cities: León; Aguascalientes
- Dates: 17–26 August 2023
- Teams: 16 (from 5 confederations)
- Venues: 2 (in 2 host cities)

Final positions
- Champions: China (4th title)
- Runners-up: Italy
- Third place: Brazil
- Fourth place: Japan

Tournament awards
- MVP: (China) Zhuang Yushan
- Best Setter: (Italy) Valentina Bartolucci
- Best OH: (China) Zhuang Yushan (Italy) Stella Nervini
- Best MB: (China) Wan Ziyue (Brazil) Luzia Nezzo
- Best OPP: (Italy) Anna Adelusi
- Best Libero: (China) Zhu Xingchen

Tournament statistics
- Matches played: 64
- Attendance: 61,614 (963 per match)

The 2023 FIVB Volleyball Women's U21 World Championship was the 22nd edition of the FIVB Volleyball Women's U21 World Championship, contested by the women's national teams under the age of 20 of the members of the Fédération Internationale de Volleyball (FIVB), the sport's global governing body. It was held in Mexico from 17 to 26 August 2023.

This was the first edition with under-21 national teams after FIVB decided, in March 2022, to move the age category of the women's U20 championship to U21 in order to align it with the Men's U21 World Championship.

Italy were the defending champions but failed to defend their title. China claimed their fourth title of U21 World Championship by defeating Italy 3–2 in the final match.

== Host selection ==
On 2 June 2022, FIVB opened the bidding process for member associations whose countries were interested in hosting one of the four Age Group World Championships in 2023 (i.e., U19 Boys' and Girls' World Championships and U21 Men's and Women's World Championships). The expression of interest of the member associations had to be submitted to FIVB by 29 July 2022, 18:00 CEST (UTC+2).

FIVB announced the hosts for its four Age Group World Championship on 24 January 2023, with Mexico being selected to host the 2023 Women's U21 World Championship. This will be the fifth time that Mexico hosts the FIVB Women's U21 World Championship having previously done so in 1981, 2009, 2017 and 2019.

== Qualification ==
A total of 16 national teams qualified for the final tournament. In addition to Mexico who qualified automatically as the host, 10 other teams qualified through five separate continental competitions which were required to be held by 31 December 2022 at the latest. The remaining 5 teams entered via the Women's U21 FIVB World Ranking among the teams not yet qualified.

The slot allocation was set as follows:

- AVC (Asia & Oceania): 2
- CAVB (Africa): 2
- CEV (Europe): 2
- CSV (South America): 2
- NORCECA (North, Central America and Caribbean): 2
- Host: 1
- Top teams not yet qualified as per Women's U21 FIVB World Ranking: 5

Confederation	Qualifying tournament	Team qualified	Appearances			Previous best performance
Confederation	Qualifying tournament	Team qualified	Total	First	Last	Previous best performance
AVC (Asia & Oceania)	2022 Asian Women's U20 Championship ( (Kazakhstan) Nur-Sultan, 4–11 July)	Japan	18th	1977	2019	Champions (2019)
AVC (Asia & Oceania)	2022 Asian Women's U20 Championship ( (Kazakhstan) Nur-Sultan, 4–11 July)	China	21st	1977	2019	Champions (1995, 2013, 2017)
AVC (Asia & Oceania)	Women's U21 FIVB World Ranking	Thailand	7th	1995	2021	Eighth place (2007)
CAVB (Africa)	2022 Women's U21 African Nations Championship ( (Tunisia) Tunis, 26 August–4 September)	Egypt	9th	2005	2021	Eleventh place (2005)
CAVB (Africa)	2022 Women's U21 African Nations Championship ( (Tunisia) Tunis, 26 August–4 September)	Tunisia	3rd	1995	2011	Thirteenth place (1995)
CEV (Europe)	2022 Women's U19 European Championship ( (North Macedonia) Skopje, 27 August–4 September)	Italy	17th	1985	2021	Champions (2011, 2021)
CEV (Europe)	2022 Women's U19 European Championship ( (North Macedonia) Skopje, 27 August–4 September)	Serbia	10th	1997	2021	Runners-up (2005, 2021)
CEV (Europe)	Women's U21 FIVB World Ranking	Netherlands	5th	1995	2021	Fourth place (2003, 2021)
CEV (Europe)	Women's U21 FIVB World Ranking	Poland	12th	1991	2021	Third place (2003)
CEV (Europe)	Women's U21 FIVB World Ranking	Turkey	11th	1999	2021	Fourth place (2017, 2019)
CSV (South America)	2022 Women's U21 South American Championship ( (Peru) Cajamarca, 17–21 August)	Brazil	22nd (all)	1977	2021	Champions (1987, 1989, 2001, 2003, 2005, 2007)
CSV (South America)	2022 Women's U21 South American Championship ( (Peru) Cajamarca, 17–21 August)	Argentina	13th	1977	2021	Seventh place (2001)
NORCECA (North, Central America and Caribbean)	2022 Women's Junior Pan-American Cup ( (Mexico) La Paz, 7–12 July)	United States	12th	1977	2021	Fourth place (2007, 2011)
NORCECA (North, Central America and Caribbean)	2022 Women's Junior Pan-American Cup ( (Mexico) La Paz, 7–12 July)	Cuba	15th	1981	2019	Champions (1985, 1993)
NORCECA (North, Central America and Caribbean)	Host nation	Mexico	12th	1977	2019	Fourth place (1981)
NORCECA (North, Central America and Caribbean)	Women's U21 FIVB World Ranking	Dominican Republic	13th	1995	2021	Champions (2015)

== Format ==
Teams will play round-robin in each pool. The top two teams from each pool will advance to round-robin pools E and F of the second phase, while the rest will move to pools G and H to continue the battles for classification from 9th to 16th. The winners and runners-up of pools E and F will progress to the semifinals and eventually determine the medallists.

== First round ==
- All times are Central Time Zone (UTC−06:00).

=== Pool A ===
Pos	Team	Pld	W	L	Pts	SW	SL	SR	SPW	SPL	SPR	Qualification
1	Japan	3	3	0	8	9	2	4.500	254	202	1.257	Final eight (Pools E and F)
2	Mexico	3	2	1	6	6	4	1.500	222	200	1.110	Final eight (Pools E and F)
3	Egypt	3	1	2	4	6	7	0.857	271	278	0.975	9th–16th places (Pools G and H)
4	Thailand	3	0	3	0	1	9	0.111	179	246	0.728	9th–16th places (Pools G and H)

Source: FIVB

Date	Time		Score		Set 1	Set 2	Set 3	Set 4	Set 5	Total	Report
17 Aug	17:00	Egypt	3–1	Thailand	21–25	25–13	25–23	25–19		96–80	P2 Report
17 Aug	20:00	Mexico	0–3	Japan	19–25	12–25	22–25			53–75	P2 Report
18 Aug	17:00	Egypt	2–3	Japan	17–25	25–19	25–20	16–25	12–15	95–104	P2 Report
18 Aug	20:00	Mexico	3–0	Thailand	25–15	25–16	25–14			75–45	P2 Report
19 Aug	17:00	Thailand	0–3	Japan	13–25	23–25	18–25			54–75	P2 Report
19 Aug	20:00	Mexico	3–1	Egypt	25–22	25–18	19–25	25–15		94–80	P2 Report

=== Pool B ===
Pos	Team	Pld	W	L	Pts	SW	SL	SR	SPW	SPL	SPR	Qualification
1	Italy	3	3	0	9	9	1	9.000	248	168	1.476	Final eight (Pools E and F)
2	Brazil	3	2	1	6	7	3	2.333	239	170	1.406	Final eight (Pools E and F)
3	Dominican Republic	3	1	2	3	3	6	0.500	154	208	0.740	9th–16th places (Pools G and H)
4	Tunisia	3	0	3	0	0	9	0.000	130	225	0.578	9th–16th places (Pools G and H)

Source: FIVB

Date	Time		Score		Set 1	Set 2	Set 3	Set 4	Set 5	Total	Report
17 Aug	11:00	Italy	3–0	Tunisia	25–15	25–8	25–16			75–39	P2 Report
17 Aug	14:00	Brazil	3–0	Dominican Republic	25–14	25–12	25–13			75–39	P2 Report
18 Aug	11:00	Italy	3–0	Dominican Republic	25–16	25–11	25–13			75–40	P2 Report
18 Aug	14:00	Brazil	3–0	Tunisia	25–9	25–9	25–15			75–33	P2 Report
19 Aug	11:00	Italy	3–1	Brazil	23–25	25–23	25–23	25–18		98–89	P2 Report
19 Aug	14:00	Dominican Republic	3–0	Tunisia	25–20	25–18	25–20			75–58	P2 Report

=== Pool C ===
Pos	Team	Pld	W	L	Pts	SW	SL	SR	SPW	SPL	SPR	Qualification
1	China	3	2	1	6	6	3	2.000	219	183	1.197	Final eight (Pools E and F)
2	Serbia	3	2	1	6	7	4	1.750	264	254	1.039	Final eight (Pools E and F)
3	Poland	3	1	2	3	4	6	0.667	217	237	0.916	9th–16th places (Pools G and H)
4	Argentina	3	1	2	3	3	7	0.429	216	242	0.893	9th–16th places (Pools G and H)

Source: FIVB

Date	Time		Score		Set 1	Set 2	Set 3	Set 4	Set 5	Total	Report
17 Aug	11:00	Serbia	3–0	China	26–24	25–21	26–24			77–69	P2 Report
17 Aug	14:00	Poland	3–0	Argentina	25–17	27–25	25–23			77–65	P2 Report
18 Aug	11:00	Serbia	1–3	Argentina	24–26	25–21	23–25	18–25		90–97	P2 Report
18 Aug	14:00	Poland	0–3	China	18–25	15–25	19–25			52–75	P2 Report
19 Aug	11:00	Serbia	3–1	Poland	25–21	25–21	22–25	25–21		97–88	P2 Report
19 Aug	14:00	Argentina	0–3	China	15–25	22–25	17–25			54–75	P2 Report

=== Pool D ===
Pos	Team	Pld	W	L	Pts	SW	SL	SR	SPW	SPL	SPR	Qualification
1	Turkey	3	3	0	8	9	3	3.000	283	231	1.225	Final eight (Pools E and F)
2	United States	3	2	1	6	7	4	1.750	250	232	1.078	Final eight (Pools E and F)
3	Netherlands	3	1	2	4	6	6	1.000	253	263	0.962	9th–16th places (Pools G and H)
4	Cuba	3	0	3	0	0	9	0.000	168	228	0.737	9th–16th places (Pools G and H)

Source: FIVB

Date	Time		Score		Set 1	Set 2	Set 3	Set 4	Set 5	Total	Report
17 Aug	17:00	United States	3–0	Cuba	25–23	25–14	25–21			75–58	P2 Report
17 Aug	20:00	Netherlands	2–3	Turkey	26–24	18–25	16–25	25–22	13–15	98–111	P2 Report
18 Aug	17:00	United States	1–3	Turkey	17–25	25–22	23–25	14–25		79–97	P2 Report
18 Aug	20:00	Netherlands	3–0	Cuba	28–26	25–16	25–14			78–56	P2 Report
19 Aug	17:00	United States	3–1	Netherlands	21–25	25–20	25–15	25–17		96–77	P2 Report
19 Aug	20:00	Turkey	3–0	Cuba	25–14	25–22	25–18			75–54	P2 Report

== Second round ==
- All times are Central Time Zone (UTC−06:00).

=== Pool E ===
Pos	Team	Pld	W	L	Pts	SW	SL	SR	SPW	SPL	SPR	Qualification
1	China	3	3	0	8	9	3	3.000	281	209	1.344	Semifinals
2	Japan	3	2	1	5	7	6	1.167	272	284	0.958	Semifinals
3	Serbia	3	1	2	5	7	6	1.167	272	275	0.989	5th–8th semifinals
4	Mexico	3	0	3	0	1	9	0.111	193	250	0.772	5th–8th semifinals

Source: FIVB

Date	Time		Score		Set 1	Set 2	Set 3	Set 4	Set 5	Total	Report
21 Aug	17:00	Japan	3–2	Serbia	25–19	18–25	25–22	23–25	15–13	106–104	P2 Report
21 Aug	20:00	Mexico	0–3	China	14–25	11–25	24–26			49–76	P2 Report
22 Aug	17:00	Japan	1–3	China	15–25	11–25	25–21	16–25		67–96	P2 Report
22 Aug	20:00	Mexico	0–3	Serbia	23–25	17–25	20–25			60–75	P2 Report
23 Aug	17:00	China	3–2	Serbia	19–25	25–18	25–11	25–27	15–12	109–93	P2 Report
23 Aug	20:00	Japan	3–1	Mexico	25–17	25–20	24–26	25–21		99–84	P2 Report

=== Pool F ===
Pos	Team	Pld	W	L	Pts	SW	SL	SR	SPW	SPL	SPR	Qualification
1	Italy	3	3	0	9	9	2	4.500	284	213	1.333	Semifinals
2	Brazil	3	2	1	6	7	3	2.333	229	206	1.112	Semifinals
3	United States	3	1	2	3	4	7	0.571	230	271	0.849	5th–8th semifinals
4	Turkey	3	0	3	0	1	9	0.111	192	245	0.784	5th–8th semifinals

Source: FIVB

Date	Time		Score		Set 1	Set 2	Set 3	Set 4	Set 5	Total	Report
21 Aug	17:00	Italy	3–1	United States	25–19	25–10	32–34	25–17		107–80	P2 Report
21 Aug	20:00	Brazil	3–0	Turkey	25–15	25–21	25–13			75–49	P2 Report
22 Aug	17:00	Italy	3–0	Turkey	25–6	29–27	25–21			79–54	P2 Report
22 Aug	20:00	Brazil	3–0	United States	25–19	25–18	25–22			75–59	P2 Report
23 Aug	17:00	Italy	3–1	Brazil	22–25	25–15	25–15	26–24		98–79	P2 Report
23 Aug	20:00	Turkey	1–3	United States	23–25	25–16	20–25	21–25		89–91	P2 Report

=== Pool G ===
Pos	Team	Pld	W	L	Pts	SW	SL	SR	SPW	SPL	SPR	Qualification
1	Argentina	3	2	1	7	8	3	2.667	258	238	1.084	9th–12th semifinals
2	Poland	3	2	1	6	6	3	2.000	205	184	1.114	9th–12th semifinals
3	Egypt	3	2	1	4	6	7	0.857	277	266	1.041	13th–16th semifinals
4	Thailand	3	0	3	1	2	9	0.222	205	257	0.798	13th–16th semifinals

Source: FIVB

Date	Time		Score		Set 1	Set 2	Set 3	Set 4	Set 5	Total	Report
21 Aug	11:00	Thailand	0–3	Poland	16–25	14–25	21–25			51–75	P2 Report
21 Aug	14:00	Egypt	3–2	Argentina	25–19	23–25	22–25	31–29	15–6	116–104	P2 Report
22 Aug	11:00	Thailand	0–3	Argentina	27–29	22–25	19–25			68–79	P2 Report
22 Aug	14:00	Egypt	0–3	Poland	24–26	17–25	17–25			58–76	P2 Report
23 Aug	11:00	Poland	0–3	Argentina	20–25	16–25	18–25			54–75	P2 Report
23 Aug	14:00	Egypt	3–2	Thailand	22–25	25–16	16–25	25–9	15–11	103–86	P2 Report

=== Pool H ===
Pos	Team	Pld	W	L	Pts	SW	SL	SR	SPW	SPL	SPR	Qualification
1	Netherlands	3	3	0	9	9	0	MAX	225	158	1.424	9th–12th semifinals
2	Cuba	3	2	1	6	6	5	1.200	240	243	0.988	9th–12th semifinals
3	Dominican Republic	3	1	2	3	4	7	0.571	236	256	0.922	13th–16th semifinals
4	Tunisia	3	0	3	0	2	9	0.222	220	264	0.833	13th–16th semifinals

Source: FIVB

Date	Time		Score		Set 1	Set 2	Set 3	Set 4	Set 5	Total	Report
21 Aug	11:00	Dominican Republic	1–3	Cuba	25–17	17–25	23–25	21–25		86–92	P2 Report
21 Aug	14:00	Tunisia	0–3	Netherlands	15–25	18–25	16–25			49–75	P2 Report
22 Aug	11:00	Dominican Republic	0–3	Netherlands	15–25	18–25	19–25			52–75	P2 Report
22 Aug	14:00	Tunisia	1–3	Cuba	25–16	23–25	20–25	14–25		82–91	P2 Report
23 Aug	11:00	Dominican Republic	3–1	Tunisia	25–19	25–23	23–25	25–22		98–89	P2 Report
23 Aug	14:00	Netherlands	3–0	Cuba	25–15	25–19	25–23			75–57	P2 Report

== Final round ==
- All times are Central Time Zone (UTC−06:00).

=== 13th–16th places ===
13th–16th semifinals
25 August
Egypt	3
Tunisia	1
25 August
Dominican Republic	3
Thailand	0

13th place match
26 August
Egypt	3
Dominican Republic	0
15th place match
26 August
Tunisia	0
Thailand	3

==== 13th–16th semifinals ====
Date	Time		Score		Set 1	Set 2	Set 3	Set 4	Set 5	Total	Report
25 Aug	11:00	Egypt	3–1	Tunisia	25–23	24–26	25–13	25–14		99–76	P2 Report
25 Aug	14:00	Dominican Republic	3–0	Thailand	25–23	25–23	25–20			75–66	P2 Report

==== 15th place match ====
Date	Time		Score		Set 1	Set 2	Set 3	Set 4	Set 5	Total	Report
26 Aug	11:00	Tunisia	0–3	Thailand	24–26	13–25	20–25			57–76	P2 Report

==== 13th place match ====
Date	Time		Score		Set 1	Set 2	Set 3	Set 4	Set 5	Total	Report
26 Aug	14:00	Egypt	3–0	Dominican Republic	25–23	25–21	25–14			75–58	P2 Report

=== 9th–12th places ===
9th–12th semifinals
25 August
Argentina	3
Cuba	1
25 August
Netherlands	3
Poland	1

9th place match
26 August
Argentina	3
Netherlands	0
11th place match
26 August
Cuba	1
Poland	3

==== 9th–12th semifinals ====
Date	Time		Score		Set 1	Set 2	Set 3	Set 4	Set 5	Total	Report
25 Aug	17:00	Argentina	3–1	Cuba	25–20	24–26	25–17	25–19		99–82	P2 Report
25 Aug	20:00	Netherlands	3–1	Poland	19–25	25–21	31–29	25–20		100–95	P2 Report

==== 11th place match ====
Date	Time		Score		Set 1	Set 2	Set 3	Set 4	Set 5	Total	Report
26 Aug	17:00	Cuba	1–3	Poland	25–21	17–25	18–25	20–25		80–96	P2 Report

==== 9th place match ====
Date	Time		Score		Set 1	Set 2	Set 3	Set 4	Set 5	Total	Report
26 Aug	20:00	Argentina	3–0	Netherlands	25–12	25–19	25–23			75–54	P2 Report

=== 5th–8th places ===
5th–8th semifinals
25 August
Serbia	1
Turkey	3
25 August
United States	3
Mexico	2

5th place match
26 August
Turkey	3
United States	1
7th place match
26 August
Serbia	3
Mexico	2

==== 5th–8th semifinals ====
Date	Time		Score		Set 1	Set 2	Set 3	Set 4	Set 5	Total	Report
25 Aug	11:00	Serbia	1–3	Turkey	25–22	24–26	14–25	22–25		85–98	P2 Report
25 Aug	20:00	United States	3–2	Mexico	23–25	25–21	27–25	24–26	15–11	114–108	P2 Report

==== 7th place match ====
Date	Time		Score		Set 1	Set 2	Set 3	Set 4	Set 5	Total	Report
26 Aug	11:00	Serbia	3–2	Mexico	19–25	24–26	25–18	25–13	16–14	109–96	P2 Report

==== 5th place match ====
Date	Time		Score		Set 1	Set 2	Set 3	Set 4	Set 5	Total	Report
26 Aug	14:00	Turkey	3–1	United States	26–28	25–20	25–19	25–18		101–85	P2 Report

=== Final four ===
Semifinals
25 August
China	3
Brazil	2
25 August
Italy	3
Japan	0

Final
26 August
China	3
Italy	2
3rd place match
26 August
Brazil	3
Japan	0

==== Semifinals ====
Date	Time		Score		Set 1	Set 2	Set 3	Set 4	Set 5	Total	Report
25 Aug	14:00	China	3–2	Brazil	27–25	25–17	20–25	19–25	15–6	106–98	P2 Report
25 Aug	17:00	Italy	3–0	Japan	25–22	25–13	25–18			75–53	P2 Report

==== 3rd place match ====
Date	Time		Score		Set 1	Set 2	Set 3	Set 4	Set 5	Total	Report
26 Aug	17:00	Brazil	3–0	Japan	25–16	25–21	25–14			75–51	P2 Report

==== Final ====
Date	Time		Score		Set 1	Set 2	Set 3	Set 4	Set 5	Total	Report
26 Aug	20:00	China	3–2	Italy	19–25	25–23	23–25	25–22	15–8	107–103	P2 Report

== Final standing ==
Rank	Team
Gold medal	China
Silver medal	Italy
Bronze medal	Brazil
4	Japan
5	Turkey
6	United States
7	Serbia
8	Mexico
9	Argentina
10	Netherlands
11	Poland
12	Cuba
13	Egypt
14	Dominican Republic
15	Thailand
16	Tunisia

2023 Women's U21 World champions

China
4th title

12–woman Roster
Zhuang Yushan (C), Zhu Xingchen, Zhao Yalun, Wang Yifan,
Wan Ziyue, Zeng Jieya, Tang Xin, Yin Xiaolan,
Wang Yindi, Yang Jia, Xie Shengyan. Shan Linqian
Head coach
Qi Kuang

== Awards ==
- Most valuable player
  (China) Zhuang Yushan
- Best setter
  (Italy) Valentina Bartolucci
- Best outside spikers
  (China) Zhuang Yushan
  (Italy) Stella Nervini
- Best middle blockers
  (China) Wan Ziyue
  (Brazil) Luzia Nezzo
- Best opposite spiker
  (Italy) Anna Adelusi
- Best libero
  (China) Zhu Xingchen

== See also ==
- 2023 FIVB Volleyball Girls' U19 World Championship
- 2023 FIVB Volleyball Boys' U19 World Championship
- 2023 FIVB Volleyball Men's U21 World Championship
