= CEV Women's U22 Volleyball European Championship =

European Volleyball Confederation event

- Most recent season or competition: 2026 Women's U22 European Volleyball Championship
- Sport: Volleyball
- Founded: 2022; 4 years ago
- First season: 2022
- No. of teams: 8
- Continent: Europe (CEV)
- Most recent champion: Italy (3rd title)
- Most titles: Italy (3 titles)
- Website: cev.eu

The Women's U22 European Volleyball Championship is a sport competition for volleyball national teams with players under 22 years, currently held biannually and organized by the European Volleyball Confederation, the volleyball federation from Europe. As of the 2024 edition, the CEV has aligned the age limit for the men's and women's competitions to U22.

== Results summary ==
| Year | Host | Final | | | Third place match | | | Teams |
| Year | Host | Champions | Score | Runners-up | 3rd place | Score | 4th place | Teams |
|---|---|---|---|---|---|---|---|---|
| 2022; Details | Italy | Italy | 3–2 | Serbia | Turkey | 3–2 | Poland | 8 |
| 2024; Details | Italy | Italy | 3–0 | Serbia | Turkey | 3–0 | Poland | 8 |
| 2026; Details | Netherlands | Italy | 3–1 | Serbia | Netherlands | 3–0 | Spain | 8 |

== Medal table ==
| Rank | Nation | Gold | Silver | Bronze | Total |
|---|---|---|---|---|---|
| 1 | Italy | 3 | 0 | 0 | 3 |
| 2 | Serbia | 0 | 3 | 0 | 3 |
| 3 | Turkey | 0 | 0 | 2 | 2 |
| 4 | Netherlands | 0 | 0 | 1 | 1 |
| Totals (4 entries) | | 3 | 3 | 3 | 9 |

== Participating nations ==
| Nation | (Italy) 2022 | (Italy) 2024 | (Netherlands) 2026 | Years |
|---|---|---|---|---|
| Austria | 8th | | | 1 |
| Czech Republic | | 5th | | 1 |
| Denmark | 6th | | | 1 |
| Israel | 7th | | | 1 |
| Italy | 1st | 1st | 1st | 3 |
| Latvia | | 8th | | 1 |
| Netherlands | | | 3rd | 1 |
| Poland | 4th | 4th | 5th | 3 |
| Portugal | | 7th | 8th | 2 |
| Serbia | 2nd | 2nd | 2nd | 3 |
| Spain | | | 4th | 1 |
| Turkey | 3rd | 3rd | 6th | 3 |
| Ukraine | 5th | 6th | 7th | 3 |
