= 2026 Women's U22 European Volleyball Championship =

Tournament details
- Host country: Netherlands
- Dates: 6–12 July 2026
- Teams: 8
- Venue: 1 (in 1 host city)

Final positions
- Champions: Italy (3rd title)

Tournament awards
- MVP: (Italy) Merit Adigwew

The 2026 Women's U22 European Volleyball Championship, also referred to as EuroVolleyU22W 2026, was the 3rd edition of the biannual continental tournament for women's under-22 national volleyball teams, organised by Europe's governing volleyball body, CEV. The tournament was held between from 6 to 12 July 2026. It was organised in Netherlands, marking the first time the country hosted this championship.

8 teams participated for the third time as well. Qualification took place in July 2025 to decide the final 7 spots. The hosts Netherlands qualified automatically. Spain will make their debut.

Italy are the defending champions, having beaten Serbia, 3–0, in the final in Lecce.

== Qualification ==
Means of qualification		Qualifier
Host country		Netherlands
Qualification round	Pool A	Italy
Qualification round	Pool B	Ukraine
Qualification round	Pool C	Poland
Qualification round	Pool D	Turkey
Qualification round	Pool E	Serbia
Qualification round	Best runners-up	Portugal
Qualification round	Best runners-up	Spain

== Pools composition ==
The drawing of lots was held on 22 January 2026.

Pool I	Pool II
Netherlands	Italy
Turkey	Serbia
Ukraine	Poland
Spain	Portugal

== Venue ==
The Hague, Netherlands	The Hague is located in Netherlands
Sportcampus Zuiderpark	The Hague is located in Netherlands
Capacity: 3,500	The Hague is located in Netherlands

== Group stage ==
=== Pool I ===
Pos	Team	Pld	W	L	Pts	SW	SL	SR	SPW	SPL	SPR	Qualification
1	Netherlands (H)	3	2	1	7	8	3	2.667	253	209	1.211	Semifinals
2	Spain	3	2	1	4	7	7	1.000	289	298	0.970	Semifinals
3	Turkey	3	1	2	4	5	6	0.833	233	229	1.017	
4	Ukraine	3	1	2	3	3	7	0.429	197	236	0.835	

Source: CEV.eu
(H) Host

Date	Time		Score		Set 1	Set 2	Set 3	Set 4	Set 5	Total	Report
7 Jul	17:00	Ukraine	0–3	Turkey	21–25	15–25	16–25			52–75	Report
7 Jul	20:30	Netherlands	2–3	Spain	21–25	23–25	25–19	25–17	9–15	103–101	Report
8 Jul	17:00	Turkey	2–3	Spain	25–12	27–25	23–25	19–25	5–15	99–102	Report
8 Jul	20:30	Ukraine	0–3	Netherlands	18–25	15–25	16–25			49–75	Report
9 Jul	17:00	Spain	1–3	Ukraine	25–21	17–25	22–25	22–25		86–96	Report
9 Jul	20:30	Turkey	0–3	Netherlands	21–25	18–25	20–25			59–75	Report

=== Pool II ===
Pos	Team	Pld	W	L	Pts	SW	SL	SR	SPW	SPL	SPR	Qualification
1	Italy	3	3	0	8	9	3	3.000	279	238	1.172	Semifinals
2	Serbia	3	2	1	6	7	5	1.400	285	277	1.029	Semifinals
3	Poland	3	1	2	4	6	6	1.000	266	266	1.000	
4	Portugal	3	0	3	0	1	9	0.111	196	245	0.800	

Source: CEV.eu

Date	Time		Score		Set 1	Set 2	Set 3	Set 4	Set 5	Total	Report
7 Jul	16:00	Serbia	3–1	Portugal	25–21	19–25	25–18	25–23		94–87	Report
7 Jul	19:30	Italy	3–2	Poland	25–22	25–16	19–25	21–25	15–11	105–99	Report
8 Jul	16:00	Portugal	0–3	Poland	18–25	22–25	18–25			58–75	Report
8 Jul	19:30	Serbia	1–3	Italy	19–25	25–27	25–21	19–25		88–98	Report
9 Jul	16:00	Poland	1–3	Serbia	25–19	16–25	19–25	32–34		92–103	Report
9 Jul	19:30	Portugal	0–3	Italy	13–25	24–26	14–25			51–76	Report

== Final round ==
Semifinals
11 July
Netherlands	2
Serbia	3
11 July
Spain	0
Italy	3

Final
12 July
Serbia	1
Italy	3
3rd place match
12 July
Netherlands	3
Spain	0

=== Semifinals ===
Date	Time		Score		Set 1	Set 2	Set 3	Set 4	Set 5	Total	Report
11 Jul	15:30	Netherlands	2–3	Serbia	26–28	25–20	28–26	22–25	12–15	113–114	Report
11 Jul	12:30	Spain	0–3	Italy	11–25	15–25	15–25			41–75	Report

=== 3rd place match ===
Date	Time		Score		Set 1	Set 2	Set 3	Set 4	Set 5	Total	Report
12 Jul	15:00	Netherlands	3–0	Spain	25–21	25–23	25–17			75–61	Report

=== Final ===
Date	Time		Score		Set 1	Set 2	Set 3	Set 4	Set 5	Total	Report
12 Jul	18:30	Serbia	1–3	Italy	21–25	19–25	25–18	13–25		78–93	Report

== Dream Team ==
- MVP
  (Italy) Merit Adigwew
- Best setter
  (Italy) Helena Sassolini
- Best outside spikers
  (Italy) Giorgia Amoruso
  (Netherlands) Sjakkie Donkers
- Best middle blockers
  (Serbia) Lana Mijačić
  (Italy) Dalila Marchesini
- Best Opposite
  (Serbia) Milica Vidačić
- Best libero
  (Serbia) Višnja Žigić

== See also ==
- 2026 Men's U22 European Volleyball Championship
