= Serbia women's national under-21 volleyball team =

Serbia U20
- Association: Serbian Volleyball Federation
- Confederation: CEV

Uniforms
Home	Away	Third

FIVB U21 World Championship
- Appearances: 6 (First in 2011)
- Best result: (silver) Runners up : (2021)

CEV Europe U19 Championship
- Appearances: 8 (First in 2008)
- Best result: (gold) Champions : (2014)
- Official website
Honours
Representing Yugoslavia / Serbia and Montenegro / Serbia
U21 World Championship
Silver medal – second place	2005 Turkey
Silver medal – second place	2021 Belgium/Netherlands
U21/22 European Championship
Silver medal – second place	2022 Italy
Silver medal – second place	2024 Italy
Silver medal – second place	2026 Netherlands
U19 European Championship
Gold medal – first place	2014 Finland/Estonia
Silver medal – second place	2004 Slovakia
Silver medal – second place	2010 Serbia
Silver medal – second place	2012 Turkey
Silver medal – second place	2016 Hungary/Slovakia
Silver medal – second place	2020 Bosnia and Herzegovina/Croatia
Silver medal – second place	2022 North Macedonia

The Serbia women's national under-20 volleyball team represents Serbia in international women's volleyball competitions and friendly matches under the age 20 and it is ruled by the Serbian Volleyball Federation that is an affiliate of International Volleyball Federation FIVB and also a part of European Volleyball Confederation CEV.

== Results ==
=== FIVB U21 World Championship ===
Champions Runners up Third place Fourth place

FIVB U21 World Championship
Year	Round	Position	Pld	W	L	SW	SL	Squad
(Brazil) 1977	See Yugoslavia							
(Mexico) 1981	See Yugoslavia							
(Italy) 1985	See Yugoslavia							
(South Korea) 1987	See Yugoslavia							
(Peru) 1989	See Yugoslavia							
(Czechoslovakia) 1991	See Yugoslavia							
(Brazil) 1993	didn't participate							
(Thailand) 1995	didn't participate							
(Poland) 1997	Second Round	9th place	4	1	3	4	10	Squad
(Canada) 1999	Second Round	9th place	4	1	3	4	11	Squad
(Dominican Republic) 2001	didn't qualify							
(Thailand) 2003	didn't qualify							
(Turkey) 2005	Final	2nd place	7	5	2	17	12	Squad
(Thailand) 2007	didn't qualify							
(Mexico) 2009	didn't qualify							
(Peru) 2011	Final round	13th place	8	3	5	14	16	Squad
(Czech Republic) 2013	Final round	7th place	8	5	3	16	11	Squad
(Puerto Rico) 2015	Final round	5th place	8	5	3	17	13	Squad
(Mexico) 2017	Final round	10th place	8	5	3	18	13	Squad
(Mexico) 2019	Final round	9th place	8	5	3	19	12	Squad
(Belgium) (Netherlands) 2021	Final	2nd place	8	6	2	18	7	Squad
(Mexico) 2023	Second round	7th place	8	4	4	18	15	Squad
(Indonesia) 2025	Final round	14th place	9	5	4	16	15	
Total	0 title	11/23						

=== Europe U21/22 Championship ===
Champions Runners up Third place Fourth place

Europe U21/22 Championship
Year	Round	Position	Pld	W	L	SW	SL	Squad
(Italy) 2022	Final	2nd place	5	3	2	13	6	Squad
(Italy) 2024	Final	2nd place	5	4	1	12	5	Squad
(Netherlands) 2026	Final	2nd place	5	3	2	11	10	Squad
Total	0 Titles	3/3	15	10	5	36	21	

=== Europe U19 Championship ===
Champions Runners up Third place Fourth place

Europe U19 Championship
Year	Round	Position	Pld	W	L	SW	SL	Squad
(Hungary) 1966	See Yugoslavia							
(Soviet Union) 1969	See Yugoslavia							
(Italy) 1971	See Yugoslavia							
(Netherlands) 1973	See Yugoslavia							
(West Germany) 1975	See Yugoslavia							
(Socialist Federal Republic of Yugoslavia) 1977	See Yugoslavia							
(Spain) 1979	See Yugoslavia							
(West Germany) 1982	See Yugoslavia							
(France) 1984	See Yugoslavia							
(Bulgaria) 1986	See Yugoslavia							
(Italy) 1988	See Yugoslavia							
(Austria) 1990	See Yugoslavia							
(Greece) 1992	See Yugoslavia							
(Hungary) 1994	See Serbia and Montenegro							
(Turkey) 1996	See Serbia and Montenegro							
(Belgium) 1998	See Serbia and Montenegro							

Europe U19 Championship
Year	Round	Position	Pld	W	L	SW	SL	Squad
(Switzerland) 2000
(Croatia) 2002
(Slovakia) 2004	Final	2nd place	7	6	1	18	6	Squad
(France) 2006		6th place	7	4	3	12	12	Squad
(Italy) 2008		4th place						Squad
(Serbia) 2010	Final	2nd place						Squad
(Turkey) 2012	Final	2nd place	7	6	1	18	4	Squad
(Finland) / (Estonia) 2014	Final	1st place	7	7	0	21	2	Squad
(Hungary) / (Slovakia) 2016	Final	2nd place	7	5	2	16	9	Squad
(Albania) 2018		5th place	7	5	2	16	9	Squad
(Bosnia and Herzegovina) / (Croatia) 2020	Final	2nd place	6	4	2	16	8	Squad
(North Macedonia) 2022	Final	2nd place	7	6	1	20	3	Squad
(Bulgaria) / (Republic of Ireland) 2024		8th place	7	4	3	14	12	Squad
Total	1 title	11/29						

== Current squad ==
The following is the Serbian roster in the 2019 FIVB Volleyball Women's U20 World Championship.

Head coach: Marijana Boričić

No.	Name	Date of birth	Height	Weight	Spike	Block	2019 club
3	Bojana Gočanin	25 September 2002	1.79 m (5 ft 10 in)	66 kg (146 lb)	286 cm (113 in)	276 cm (109 in)	(Serbia) Takovo Zvezda Helios GM
4	Isidora Rodić	27 January 2001	1.85 m (6 ft 1 in)	77 kg (170 lb)	298 cm (117 in)	289 cm (114 in)	(Serbia) VIZURA Beograd
6	Vanja Savić	13 May 2002	1.88 m (6 ft 2 in)	73 kg (161 lb)	306 cm (120 in)	295 cm (116 in)	(Serbia) Omladinac NB
8	Tara Taubner	11 January 2002	1.88 m (6 ft 2 in)	75 kg (165 lb)	310 cm (120 in)	305 cm (120 in)	(Serbia) Crvena Zvezda Beograd
9	Rada Perović	13 April 2001	1.82 m (6 ft 0 in)	74 kg (163 lb)	290 cm (110 in)	280 cm (110 in)	(Serbia) KLEK Klek
10	Miljana Glušac	3 September 2000	1.86 m (6 ft 1 in)	72 kg (159 lb)	295 cm (116 in)	287 cm (113 in)	(Serbia) Jedinstvo SP
11	Milica Milunović	27 February 2001	1.84 m (6 ft 0 in)	65 kg (143 lb)	290 cm (110 in)	280 cm (110 in)	(Serbia) Crvena Zvezda Beograd
12	Jovana Mirosavljević (c)	16 January 2000	1.83 m (6 ft 0 in)	68 kg (150 lb)	290 cm (110 in)	281 cm (111 in)	(Serbia) Jedinstvo SP
14	Ana-Marija Jonjev	1 January 2000	1.78 m (5 ft 10 in)	65 kg (143 lb)	275 cm (108 in)	268 cm (106 in)	(Serbia) Partizan
16	Veronika Djokić	27 August 2001	1.87 m (6 ft 2 in)	74 kg (163 lb)	298 cm (117 in)	287 cm (113 in)	(Serbia) Jedinstvo SP
20	Jovana Cvetković	25 March 2002	1.86 m (6 ft 1 in)	68 kg (150 lb)	298 cm (117 in)	287 cm (113 in)	(Serbia) TENT Obrenovac
28	Ana Pejičić	5 November 2000	1.9 m (6 ft 3 in)	69 kg (152 lb)	299 cm (118 in)	288 cm (113 in)	(Serbia) Vizura Beograd
