= 2024 Women's U22 European Volleyball Championship =

Tournament details
- Host country: Italy
- Dates: 1–6 July 2024
- Teams: 8

Final positions
- Champions: Italy (2nd title)

Tournament awards
- MVP: (Italy) Beatrice Gardini

The 2024 Women's U22 European Volleyball Championship was the second edition of the Women's U22 European Volleyball Championship, a biennial international volleyball tournament organized by the European Volleyball Confederation (CEV). The tournament was held in Italy from 1 to 6 July 2024.

== Qualification ==
Means of qualification		Qualifier
Host country		Italy
Qualification round	Pool A	Portugal
Qualification round	Pool B	Poland
Qualification round	Pool C	Turkey
Qualification round	Pool D	Serbia
Qualification round	Best runners-up	Ukraine
Qualification round	Best runners-up	Latvia
Qualification round	Best runners-up	Czech Republic

== Pools composition ==
The drawing of lots was combined with a seeding of National Federations and performed as follows:

1. Organiser, Italy, were seeded in Pool I
2. The highest ranked participating team from the CEV European Ranking, Serbia, were seeded in Pool II
3. Remaining 6 participating teams drawn after they were previously placed in three cups as per their position in the latest European Ranking for U22 national teams (as of 27 June 2023)

Pot 1	Pot 2	Pot 3
Turkey; Poland	Ukraine; Portugal	Czech Republic; Latvia

Result

The drawing of lots was held on 18 January 2024.

Pool I	Pool II
Italy	Serbia
Turkey	Poland
Ukraine	Portugal
Latvia	Czech Republic

== Venues ==
Pool I, Final round		Pool II	
Lecce, Italy	Lecce is located in Italy	Copertino, Italy	Copertino is located in Italy
Palazzetto dello Sport	Lecce is located in Italy	Palazzetto dello Sport	Copertino is located in Italy
Capacity: ?	Lecce is located in Italy	Capacity: ?	Copertino is located in Italy

== Group stage ==
=== Pool I ===
Pos	Team	Pld	W	L	Pts	SW	SL	SR	SPW	SPL	SPR	Qualification
1	Italy	3	3	0	9	9	0	MAX	228	152	1.500	Semifinals
2	Turkey	3	2	1	6	6	3	2.000	217	165	1.315	Semifinals
3	Ukraine	3	1	2	3	3	7	0.429	197	235	0.838	
4	Latvia	3	0	3	0	1	9	0.111	161	251	0.641	

Updated to match(es) played on 2 July 2024. Source: CEV.eu

Date	Time		Score		Set 1	Set 2	Set 3	Set 4	Set 5	Total	Report
1 Jul	18:00	Ukraine	0–3	Turkey	21–25	13–25	18–25			52–75	Report
1 Jul	21:00	Italy	3–0	Latvia	25–14	25–12	25–15			75–41	Report
2 Jul	18:00	Turkey	3–0	Latvia	25–13	25–11	25–11			75–35	Report
2 Jul	21:00	Ukraine	0–3	Italy	16–25	14–25	14–25			44–75	Report
3 Jul	18:00	Latvia	1–3	Ukraine	25–23	26–28	13–25	21–25		85–101	Report
3 Jul	21:00	Turkey	0–3	Italy	24–26	18–25	25–27			67–78	Report

=== Pool II ===
Pos	Team	Pld	W	L	Pts	SW	SL	SR	SPW	SPL	SPR	Qualification
1	Serbia	3	3	0	9	9	0	MAX	230	177	1.299	Semifinals
2	Poland	3	2	1	6	6	3	2.000	221	205	1.078	Semifinals
3	Czech Republic	3	1	2	3	3	7	0.429	210	231	0.909	
4	Portugal	3	0	3	0	1	9	0.111	199	247	0.806	

Updated to match(es) played on 2 July 2024. Source: CEV.eu

Date	Time		Score		Set 1	Set 2	Set 3	Set 4	Set 5	Total	Report
1 Jul	18:00	Serbia	3–0	Poland	26–24	25–18	29–27			80–69	Report
1 Jul	21:00	Portugal	1–3	Czech Republic	23–25	25–20	19–25	14–25		81–95	Report
2 Jul	18:00	Poland	3–0	Czech Republic	25–17	25–16	25–21			75–54	Report
2 Jul	21:00	Serbia	3–0	Portugal	25–16	25–12	25–19			75–47	Report
3 Jul	18:00	Czech Republic	0–3	Serbia	17–25	23–25	21–25			61–75	Report
3 Jul	21:00	Poland	3–0	Portugal	25–23	27–25	25–23			77–71	Report

== Final round ==
Semifinals
5 July
Italy	3
Poland	1
5 July
Serbia	3
Turkey	2

Final
6 July
Italy	3
Serbia	0
3rd place match
6 July
Poland	0
Turkey	3

=== Semifinals ===
Date	Time		Score		Set 1	Set 2	Set 3	Set 4	Set 5	Total	Report
5 Jul	18:00	Serbia	3–2	Turkey	25–20	25–23	20–25	17–25	15–10	102–103	Report
5 Jul	21:00	Italy	3–1	Poland	25–22	25–18	16–25	25–22		91–87	Report

=== 3rd place match ===
Date	Time		Score		Set 1	Set 2	Set 3	Set 4	Set 5	Total	Report
6 Jul	17:30	Poland	0–3	Turkey	16–25	23–25	17–25			56–75	Report

=== Final ===
Date	Time		Score		Set 1	Set 2	Set 3	Set 4	Set 5	Total	Report
6 Jul	20:30	Italy	3–0	Serbia	26–24	25–18	25–23			76–65	Report

== Dream Team ==
- MVP
  (Italy) Beatrice Gardini
- Best setter
  (Italy) Chidera Blessing Eze
- Best outside spikers
  (Serbia) Branka Tica
  (Turkey) Aleksia Karutasu
- Best middle blockers
  (Serbia) Iva Šućurović
  (Italy) Katja Eckl
- Best Opposite
  (Italy) Beatrice Gardini
- Best libero
  (Turkey) Selin Adali
