= Stella Nervini =

Italian volleyball player (born 2002)

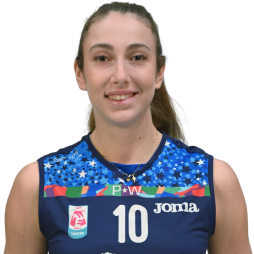

Personal information
- Born: 10 September 2003 (age 23); Milan, Italy
- Height: 184 cm (6 ft 0 in)
Honours
Women's volleyball
Representing Italy
World Championship
Gold medal – first place	2025 Thailand	Team
FIVB Nations League
Gold medal – first place	2025 Łódź	Team
Bronze medal – third place	2026 Macau	Team
European Championship
Silver medal – second place	2026 Azerbaijan-Czechia-Sweden-Turkey	Team

Stella Nervini (born 10 September 2003) is an Italian volleyball player. She represented Italy at the 2025 FIVB Women's Volleyball World Championship.

== Life and career ==
Born in Milan, Nervini grew up in Florence, where she started playing volleyball when she was 8. Her professional career started at 14 years old with San Michele, in the B1 league, the third category of Italian women's volleyball.

In 2019, at the age of 16, Nervini finished as runner-up at the U18 World Championship, and in 2021, she became world champion at FIVB Volleyball Women's U20 World Championship. After playing for Club Italia for two seasons, in 2022 she made her A1 League debut with Chieri. In 2023, she became vice world champion in the 2023 FIVB Volleyball Women's U21 World Championship, being named best spiker of the tournament.

In 2024, Nervini won the gold medal at the U22 European Volleyball Championship. The same year, she received her first call-up to the senior national team. In 2025, she made her debut with the Italian team in the match against Japan at the Nations League; Italy went on to win the tournament. Nervini was also part of the Italian roster at the 2025 FIVB Women's Volleyball World Championship.
