= FIVB Youth and Junior World Rankings =

Volleyball team rankings

The FIVB Youth and Junior World Rankings is a ranking system for men's and women's age-group (U- categories) national teams in volleyball. The teams of the member nations of Fédération Internationale de Volleyball (FIVB), volleyball's world governing body, are ranked based on their ranking in each FIVB appointed international tournaments, like the previous senior world ranking system. The rankings are used in international competitions to define the seeded teams and arrange them in pools. Specific procedures for seeding and pooling are established by the FIVB in each competition's formula, but the method usually employed is the serpentine system.

The FIVB Youth and Junior World Rankings are composed of:

- FIVB Youth World Rankings for boy's under-19 and women's under-18
- FIVB Junior World Rankings for men's under-21 and women's under-20

while FIVB under-23 World Rankings are dissolved.

== Calculation method ==
The system of point attribution for the selected FIVB World and Official Competitions below is as follows:

- World Championship final and qualifying tournaments: included for 2 years and points are also granted for the qualification matches, to the best non-qualified teams.
- Continental Championship final and qualifying tournaments: included for 2 years and points are also granted for the qualification matches, to the best non-qualified teams.

=== Points for final qualifiers ===
Place	WJCH	WYCH	CCH
1	100	100	30
2	90	90	26
3	80	80	22
4	70	70	18
5	60	60	14
6	50	50	10
7	40	40	5
8	30	30	5
9	25	25	3
10	20	20	3
11	18	18	3
12	15	15	3
13	13	13	2
14	12	12	2
15	11	11	2
16	10	10	2
17		8	
18		7	
19		6	
20		5	
QT			2
D2			2

=== Examples ===
These are example how world ranking works.

Team	Round	EJCH 2018		WJCH 2019		Total
Team	Round	Rank	Point	Rank	Point	Total
Italy	Final	1	30	2	90	120
Italy	Qualification	Q	0			0
Italy	Total	1	30	2	90	130
Germany	Final	6	10	DNQ	0	10
Germany	Qualification	Q	0			0
Germany	Total	6	10	DNQ	0	10
Romania	Final	DNQ	0	DNQ	0	0
Romania	Qualification	R3-3	2			2
Romania	Total	1	2	DNQ	0	2

== FIVB Junior World Rankings ==
Top 20 rankings
As of 12 September 2025

Men's U21
Rank	Change*	Team	Points
1	Steady	Iran	130
2	▲7	United States	110
3	Steady	Italy	104
4	▲6	Czech Republic	92
5	▲8	France	90
6	Steady	Poland	55
7	▼5	Bulgaria	46
8	▲12	Ukraine	43
9	▲6	South Korea	41
10	▼5	Brazil	40
10	▲2	Tunisia	40
10	▲8	Japan	40
10	▲56	Cuba	40
14	▼7	Egypt	39
15	▼7	Canada	36
15	Steady	Colombia	36
17	▼13	Argentina	33
18	Steady	Morocco	32
19	▲47	China	30
20	Steady	Puerto Rico	28
20	Steady	Indonesia	28

*Change: Men's versus September 2024
As of 20 August 2025

Women's U21
Rank	Change*	Team	Points
1	▲1	Italy	126
2	▲2	Japan	116
3	Steady	Brazil	100
4	▼3	China	90
5	▲23	Bulgaria	80
6	▲6	Poland	68
7	Steady	Argentina	66
8	▼3	Turkey	60
9	▼3	United States	55
10	Steady	Tunisia	40
11	▲4	Puerto Rico	37
12	▼1	Egypt	36
13	▲4	South Korea	35
14	▲11	Czech Republic	34
15	▼1	Thailand	33
16	▼3	Dominican Republic	32
16	▲1	Chile	32
16	▲1	Algeria	32
19	▲2	Canada	28
20	▼11	Mexico	24
20	▲5	Vietnam	24

*Change: Women's versus August 2024

== FIVB Youth World Rankings ==
Top 20 rankings
As of 8 August 2025

Boys' U19
Rank	Change*	Team	Points
1	Steady	France	130
2	▲17	Poland	112
3	▲19	Spain	98
4	▼2	Iran	96
5	Steady	Italy	86
6	▲8	China	55
7	▲19	Finland	54
8	▼ d	Bulgaria	53
9	Steady	Brazil	46
10	Steady	Argentina	45
11	▼8	United States	41
12	▲7	Pakistan	35
13	▲1	Tunisia	34
13	▲3	Cuba	34
15	▼11	South Korea	30
15	▼7	Egypt	30
17	▼4	Puerto Rico	29
18	▼11	Belgium	28
18	▼7	Japan	28
18	▼6	Colombia	28

*Change: Men's versus August 2024
As of 15 July 2025

Girls' U19
Rank	Change*	Team	Points
1	▲7	Bulgaria	130
2	▼1	United States	120
3	▲10	Poland	98
4	▼2	Italy	82
5	▲5	China	80
6	▼2	Turkey	73
7	▼4	Japan	66
8	▼3	Brazil	60
9	Steady	Argentina	46
10	▲10	Chinese Taipei	40
11	▲7	Belgium	38
12	▲3	Tunisia	34
13	▲1	Canada	33
13	▲6	Mexico	33
15	▼9	Thailand	31
16	▼5	Egypt	30
17	▼10	Croatia	28
18	▼6	Puerto Rico	27
19	▼3	Peru	26
20	Steady	Chile	24
20	▲2	Germany	24

*Change: Women's versus July 2024

== Notes and references ==
- Fédération Internationale de Volleyball (FIVB). "FIVB World Rankings".
