= 2019 FIVB Volleyball Women's U20 World Championship =

20th edition of the FIVB Volleyball Women's U20 World Championship

Campeonato Mundial de Femenino Sub-20 México 2019
- Official logo

Tournament details
- Host country: Mexico
- Dates: 12–21 July
- Teams: 16 (from 5 confederations)
- Venues: 2 (in 2 host cities)

Final positions
- Champions: Japan (1st title)
- Runners-up: Italy
- Third place: Russia
- Fourth place: Turkey

Tournament awards
- MVP: (Japan) Mayu Ishikawa
- Best Setter: (Japan) Tsukasa Nakagawa
- Best OH: (Japan) Haruna Soga (Japan) Mayu Ishikawa
- Best MB: (Russia) Yulia Brovkina (Turkey) Merve Atlıer
- Best OPP: (Italy) Terry Enweonwu
- Best Libero: (China) Ni Feifan

The 2019 FIVB Volleyball Women's U20 World Championship will be the twentieth edition of the FIVB Volleyball Women's U20 World Championship, contested by the women's national teams under the age of 20 of the members of the Fédération Internationale de Volleyball (FIVB), the sport's global governing body. The final tournament was held in Mexico from 12 to 21 July 2019. Mexico played hosts for this event for the fourth time.

The finals involved 16 teams, of which 15 came through qualifying competitions, while the host nation qualified automatically. Of the 16 teams, 15 had also appeared in the previous tournament in 2017, while Rwanda made its first appearances at an FIVB Volleyball Women's U20 World Championship.

China is the defending champions, having won their third title in Mexico.

== Qualification ==
A total of 16 teams qualified for the final tournament. In addition to Mexico, who qualified automatically as the hosts, another 10 teams qualified via six separate continental tournaments while the remaining 5 teams qualified via the FIVB Junior World Ranking.

Means of qualification	Date	Venue	Vacancies	Qualifier
Host country		(Switzerland) Lausanne	1	Mexico
2018 Asian Championship	10–17 June 2018	(Vietnam) Bắc Ninh and Từ Sơn	2	Japan
2018 Asian Championship	10–17 June 2018	(Vietnam) Bắc Ninh and Từ Sơn	2	China
2018 NORCECA Championship	16–24 June 2018	(Mexico) Aguascalientes City	1	United States
2018 African Championship	26 August – 2 September 2018	(Kenya) Nairobi	2	Egypt
2018 African Championship	26 August – 2 September 2018	(Kenya) Nairobi	2	Rwanda
2018 European Championship	1–9 September 2018	(Albania) Tirana and Durrës	2	Italy
2018 European Championship	1–9 September 2018	(Albania) Tirana and Durrës	2	Russia
2018 South American Championship	17–21 October 2018	(Peru) Lima	2	Brazil
2018 South American Championship	17–21 October 2018	(Peru) Lima	2	Argentina
2019 Pan-American Cup	13–18 May 2019	(Peru) Lima	1	Cuba
FIVB Junior World Ranking	As per 1 January 2019	(Switzerland) Lausanne	5	Turkey
FIVB Junior World Ranking	As per 1 January 2019	(Switzerland) Lausanne	5	Poland
FIVB Junior World Ranking	As per 1 January 2019	(Switzerland) Lausanne	5	Dominican Republic
FIVB Junior World Ranking	As per 1 January 2019	(Switzerland) Lausanne	5	Serbia
FIVB Junior World Ranking	As per 1 January 2019	(Switzerland) Lausanne	5	Peru
Total			16	

== Pools composition ==
=== First round ===
The draw was held in León, Mexico on 18 June 2019. Mexico as a host country team were seeded in the top position of pool A. The top seven teams from World ranking as per January 2019 were seed in serpentine system in first two rows. The eight remaining teams were drawn in next two rows. Numbers in brackets denote the World ranking.

Seeded teams		Pot 1	Pot 2
Mexico (Host); China (1); Russia (2); Japan (3)	Brazil (4); Turkey (5); Poland (6); United States (7)	Italy (8); Dominican Republic (9); Argentina (10); Egypt (11)	Peru (13); Serbia (13); Cuba (16); Rwanda (17)

Draw

Pool A	Pool B	Pool C	Pool D
Mexico	China	Russia	Japan
United States	Poland	Turkey	Brazil
Italy	Egypt	Argentina	Dominican Republic
Cuba	Peru	Serbia	Rwanda

=== Second round ===
Pool E		Pool F		Pool G		Pool H	
1A	Italy	1B	Poland	3A	Mexico	3B	Peru
1C	Russia	1D	Japan	3C	Serbia	3D	Dominican Republic
2B	China	2A	United States	4B	Egypt	4A	Cuba
2D	Brazil	2C	Turkey	4D	Rwanda	4C	Argentina

== Venues ==
León	Aguascalientes City
Domo de la Feria	Hermanos Carreon Stadium
Capacity: 5000	Capacity: 3000
	No Image
2019 FIVB Volleyball Women's U20 World Championship is located in Mexico

== Referees ==
There were sixteen referees from 5 continental confederations in this tournament.

AVC (1)

- (Kazakhstan) Irina Kabulbekova

CAVB (2)

- (Cameroon) Marthe Clémence Eyike
- (Tunisia) Abderrazek Hariz

CEV (4)

- (Austria) Sinisa Isajlovic
- (Germany) Sabine Witte
- (Israel) Roy Goren
- (Slovenia) Sanja Miklosic

CSV (4)

- (Brazil) Ângela Grass
- (Colombia) Misael Galindo Reyez
- (Peru) Rocio Aida Huarcaya Lopez
- (Venezuela) José Blanco Gonto

NORCECA (5)

- (Canada) Andrew Robb
- (Cuba) Lourdes Perez Perez
- (Dominican Republic) Nestor Bienvenido Mateo Perez
- (Mexico) Maria Del Carmen Idalia Duran Guzman
- (Mexico) Pablo Mendoza Sanchez

== Pool standing procedure ==
1. Number of matches won
2. Match points
3. Sets ratio
4. Points ratio
5. If the tie continues as per the point ratio between two teams, the priority will be given to the team which won the last match between them. When the tie in points ratio is between three or more teams, a new classification of these teams in the terms of points 1, 2 and 3 will be made taking into consideration only the matches in which they were opposed to each other.

Match won 3–0 or 3–1: 3 match points for the winner, 0 match points for the loser
Match won 3–2: 2 match points for the winner, 1 match point for the loser

== First round ==
=== Pool A ===
Pos	Team	Pld	W	L	Pts	SW	SL	SR	SPW	SPL	SPR	Qualification
1	Italy	3	3	0	9	9	1	9.000	252	211	1.194	Second round Pool E
2	United States	3	2	1	6	7	3	2.333	251	225	1.116	Second round Pool F
3	Mexico	3	1	2	3	3	7	0.429	214	232	0.922	Second round Pool G
4	Cuba	3	0	3	0	1	9	0.111	194	243	0.798	Second round Pool H

Date	Time		Score		Set 1	Set 2	Set 3	Set 4	Set 5	Total	Report
12 Jul	12:30	United States	1–3	Italy	26–28	25–18	28–30	22–25		101–101	P2
12 Jul	21:00	Mexico	3–1	Cuba	25–16	18–25	25–17	25–23		93–81	P2
13 Jul	12:30	Cuba	0–3	Italy	20–25	13–25	17–25			50–75	P2
13 Jul	20:00	Mexico	0–3	United States	17–25	23–25	21–25			61–75	P2
14 Jul	12:30	United States	3–0	Cuba	25–20	25–23	25–20			75–63	P2
14 Jul	20:00	Italy	3–0	Mexico	26–24	25–21	25–15			76–60	P2

=== Pool B ===
Pos	Team	Pld	W	L	Pts	SW	SL	SR	SPW	SPL	SPR	Qualification
1	Poland	3	2	1	7	8	3	2.667	236	217	1.088	Second round Pool F
2	China	3	2	1	6	8	5	1.600	301	248	1.214	Second round Pool E
3	Peru	3	2	1	5	6	5	1.200	248	235	1.055	Second round Pool H
4	Egypt	3	0	3	0	0	9	0.000	140	225	0.622	Second round Pool G

Date	Time		Score		Set 1	Set 2	Set 3	Set 4	Set 5	Total	Report
12 Jul	12:30	China	2–3	Peru	27–29	25–18	19–25	25–20	17–19	113–111	P2
12 Jul	15:00	Poland	3–0	Egypt	25–17	25–14	25–11			75–42	P2
13 Jul	12:30	Peru	3–0	Egypt	25–16	25–15	25–16			75–47	P2
13 Jul	15:00	China	3–2	Poland	23–25	25–17	25–12	25–27	15–5	113–86	P2
14 Jul	12:30	Poland	3–0	Peru	25–22	25–20	25–20			75–62	P2
14 Jul	15:00	Egypt	0–3	China	18–25	20–25	13–25			51–75	P2

=== Pool C ===
Pos	Team	Pld	W	L	Pts	SW	SL	SR	SPW	SPL	SPR	Qualification
1	Russia	3	3	0	8	9	3	3.000	278	246	1.130	Second round Pool E
2	Turkey	3	2	1	5	8	7	1.143	301	302	0.997	Second round Pool F
3	Serbia	3	1	2	3	6	8	0.750	297	297	1.000	Second round Pool G
4	Argentina	3	0	3	2	4	9	0.444	250	281	0.890	Second round Pool H

Date	Time		Score		Set 1	Set 2	Set 3	Set 4	Set 5	Total	Report
12 Jul	17:30	Russia	3–1	Serbia	25–21	30–28	21–25	25–22		101–96	P2
12 Jul	21:00	Turkey	3–2	Argentina	23–25	25–18	25–21	21–25	15–7	109–96	P2
13 Jul	17:30	Serbia	3–2	Argentina	13–25	19–25	25–22	25–12	15–13	97–97	P2
13 Jul	20:00	Russia	3–2	Turkey	25–12	25–17	16–25	20–25	16–14	102–93	P2
14 Jul	17:30	Turkey	3–2	Serbia	18–25	25–23	25–23	16–25	15–8	99–104	P2
14 Jul	20:00	Argentina	0–3	Russia	21–25	16–25	20–25			57–75	P2

=== Pool D ===
Pos	Team	Pld	W	L	Pts	SW	SL	SR	SPW	SPL	SPR	Qualification
1	Japan	3	3	0	9	9	0	MAX	226	145	1.559	Second round Pool F
2	Brazil	3	2	1	6	6	3	2.000	215	149	1.443	Second round Pool E
3	Dominican Republic	3	1	2	3	3	6	0.500	177	198	0.894	Second round Pool H
4	Rwanda	3	0	3	0	0	9	0.000	99	225	0.440	Second round Pool G

Date	Time		Score		Set 1	Set 2	Set 3	Set 4	Set 5	Total	Report
12 Jul	15:00	Japan	3–0	Rwanda	25–8	25–9	25–4			75–21	P2
12 Jul	17:30	Brazil	3–0	Dominican Republic	25–12	25–11	25–20			75–43	P2
13 Jul	15:00	Rwanda	0–3	Dominican Republic	19–25	15–25	14–25			48–75	P2
13 Jul	17:30	Japan	3–0	Brazil	26–24	25–22	25–19			76–65	P2
14 Jul	15:00	Brazil	3–0	Rwanda	25–8	25–9	25–13			75–30	P2
14 Jul	17:30	Dominican Republic	0–3	Japan	15–25	21–25	23–25			59–75	P2

== Second round ==
=== Pool E ===
Pos	Team	Pld	W	L	Pts	SW	SL	SR	SPW	SPL	SPR	Qualification
1	Italy	3	2	1	7	8	3	2.667	254	233	1.090	Semifinals
2	Russia	3	2	1	5	6	5	1.200	242	229	1.057	Semifinals
3	Brazil	3	1	2	4	5	6	0.833	241	244	0.988	5th–8th semifinals
4	China	3	1	2	2	3	8	0.375	221	252	0.877	5th–8th semifinals

Date	Time		Score		Set 1	Set 2	Set 3	Set 4	Set 5	Total	Report
16 Jul	12:30	Italy	3–0	Brazil	27–25	25–21	25–18			77–64	P2
16 Jul	15:00	China	0–3	Russia	15–25	14–25	23–25			52–75	P2
17 Jul	12:30	Russia	0–3	Brazil	22–25	23–25	14–25			59–75	P2
17 Jul	15:00	Italy	3–0	China	25–19	25–22	25–20			75–61	P2
18 Jul	12:30	China	3–2	Brazil	25–21	23–25	25–20	20–25	15–11	108–102	P2
18 Jul	15:00	Italy	2–3	Russia	25–22	25–21	21–25	20–25	11–15	102–108	P2

=== Pool F ===
Pos	Team	Pld	W	L	Pts	SW	SL	SR	SPW	SPL	SPR	Qualification
1	Japan	3	3	0	8	9	3	3.000	284	239	1.188	Semifinals
2	Turkey	3	2	1	7	8	4	2.000	281	271	1.037	Semifinals
3	Poland	3	1	2	3	5	6	0.833	249	259	0.961	5th–8th semifinals
4	United States	3	0	3	0	0	9	0.000	187	232	0.806	5th–8th semifinals

Date	Time		Score		Set 1	Set 2	Set 3	Set 4	Set 5	Total	Report
16 Jul	17:30	Poland	1–3	Turkey	26–24	23–25	21–25	18–25		88–99	P2
16 Jul	20:00	United States	0–3	Japan	18–25	15–25	20–25			53–75	P2
17 Jul	17:30	Japan	3–2	Turkey	22–25	20–25	25–15	25–19	18–16	110–100	P2
17 Jul	20:00	Poland	3–0	United States	25–18	25–20	25–23			75–61	P2
18 Jul	17:30	United States	0–3	Turkey	23–25	20–25	30–32			73–82	P2
18 Jul	20:00	Poland	1–3	Japan	20–25	26–24	21–25	19–25		86–99	P2

=== Pool G ===
Pos	Team	Pld	W	L	Pts	SW	SL	SR	SPW	SPL	SPR	Qualification
1	Mexico	3	3	0	9	9	1	9.000	246	182	1.352	9th–12th semifinals
2	Serbia	3	2	1	6	7	3	2.333	233	182	1.280	9th–12th semifinals
3	Egypt	3	1	2	3	3	6	0.500	177	205	0.863	13th–16th semifinals
4	Rwanda	3	0	3	0	0	9	0.000	138	225	0.613	13th–16th semifinals

Date	Time		Score		Set 1	Set 2	Set 3	Set 4	Set 5	Total	Report
16 Jul	15:00	Egypt	0–3	Serbia	20–25	15–25	15–25			50–75	P2
16 Jul	17:30	Mexico	3–0	Rwanda	25–14	25–17	25–16			75–47	P2
17 Jul	12:30	Serbia	3–0	Rwanda	25–12	25–12	25–12			75–36	P2
17 Jul	17:30	Mexico	3–0	Egypt	25–20	25–17	25–15			75–52	P2
18 Jul	12:30	Egypt	3–0	Rwanda	25–18	25–18	25–19			75–55	P2
18 Jul	17:30	Mexico	3–1	Serbia	21–25	25–19	25–21	25–18		96–83	P2

=== Pool H ===
Pos	Team	Pld	W	L	Pts	SW	SL	SR	SPW	SPL	SPR	Qualification
1	Argentina	3	3	0	9	9	1	9.000	243	201	1.209	9th–12th semifinals
2	Peru	3	2	1	6	6	4	1.500	232	222	1.045	9th–12th semifinals
3	Dominican Republic	3	1	2	2	4	8	0.500	254	274	0.927	13th–16th semifinals
4	Cuba	3	0	3	1	3	9	0.333	247	279	0.885	13th–16th semifinals

Date	Time		Score		Set 1	Set 2	Set 3	Set 4	Set 5	Total	Report
16 Jul	12:30	Peru	0–3	Argentina	23–25	17–25	22–25			62–75	P2
16 Jul	20:00	Cuba	2–3	Dominican Republic	20–25	20–25	25–22	25–19	16–18	106–109	P2
17 Jul	15:00	Dominican Republic	0–3	Argentina	19–25	16–25	21–25			56–75	P2
17 Jul	20:00	Peru	3–0	Cuba	27–25	25–13	25–20			77–58	P2
18 Jul	15:00	Cuba	1–3	Argentina	22–25	17–25	25–18	19–25		83–93	P2
18 Jul	20:00	Peru	3–1	Dominican Republic	18–25	25–23	25–19	25–22		93–89	P2

== Final round ==
- All times are Central Daylight Time Zone (UTC−05:00).

=== Classification 13th–16th ===
13th–16th semifinals
20 Jul
Egypt	1
Cuba	3
20 Jul
Dominican Republic	3
Rwanda	0

13th-place match
21 Jul
Cuba	0
Dominican Republic	3
15th-place match
21 Jul
Egypt	3
Rwanda	0

==== 13th–16th semifinals ====
Date	Time		Score		Set 1	Set 2	Set 3	Set 4	Set 5	Total	Report
20 Jul	12:30	Egypt	1–3	Cuba	25–20	11–25	13–25	15–25		64–95	P2
20 Jul	15:00	Dominican Republic	3–0	Rwanda	25–14	25–13	25–21			75–48	P2

==== 15th-place match ====
Date	Time		Score		Set 1	Set 2	Set 3	Set 4	Set 5	Total	Report
21 Jul	12:30	Egypt	3–0	Rwanda	25–20	26–24	26–24			77–68	P2

==== 13th-place match ====
Date	Time		Score		Set 1	Set 2	Set 3	Set 4	Set 5	Total	Report
21 Jul	15:00	Cuba	0–3	Dominican Republic	23–25	24–26	22–25			69–76	P2

=== Classification 9th–12th ===
9th–12th semifinals
20 Jul
Argentina	1
Serbia	3
20 Jul
Mexico	3
Peru	2

9th-place match
21 Jul
Serbia	3
Mexico	0
11th-place match
21 Jul
Argentina	3
Peru	1

==== 9th–12th semifinals ====
Date	Time		Score		Set 1	Set 2	Set 3	Set 4	Set 5	Total	Report
20 Jul	20:00	Argentina	1–3	Serbia	17–25	20–25	25–23	19–25		81–98	P2
20 Jul	17:30	Mexico	3–2	Peru	23–25	20–25	25–17	25–12	15–10	108–89	P2

==== 11th-place match ====
Date	Time		Score		Set 1	Set 2	Set 3	Set 4	Set 5	Total	Report
21 Jul	20:00	Argentina	3–1	Peru	25–23	25–18	23–25	26–24		99–90	P2

==== 9th-place match ====
Date	Time		Score		Set 1	Set 2	Set 3	Set 4	Set 5	Total	Report
21 Jul	17:30	Serbia	3–0	Mexico	25–23	25–18	25–22			75–63	P2

=== Classification 5th–8th ===
5th–8th semifinals
20 Jul
Brazil	3
United States	1
20 Jul
Poland	3
China	2

5th-place match
21 Jul
Brazil	2
Poland	3
7th-place match
21 Jul
United States	0
China	3

==== 5th–8th semifinals ====
Date	Time		Score		Set 1	Set 2	Set 3	Set 4	Set 5	Total	Report
20 Jul	12:30	Brazil	3–1	United States	25–15	14–25	25–9	25–15		89–64	P2
20 Jul	15:00	Poland	3–2	China	27–25	25–15	23–25	14–25	15–12	104–102	P2

==== 7th-place match ====
Date	Time		Score		Set 1	Set 2	Set 3	Set 4	Set 5	Total	Report
21 Jul	12:30	United States	0–3	China	20–25	19–25	20–25			59–75	P2

==== 5th-place match ====
Date	Time		Score		Set 1	Set 2	Set 3	Set 4	Set 5	Total	Report
21 Jul	15:00	Brazil	2–3	Poland	19–25	25–17	25–14	20–25	10–15	99–96	P2

=== Final four ===
Semifinals
20 Jul
Japan	3
Russia	2
20 Jul
Italy	3
Turkey	2

Final
21 Jul
Japan	3
Italy	2
3rd-place match
21 Jul
Russia	3
Turkey	1

==== Semifinals ====
Date	Time		Score		Set 1	Set 2	Set 3	Set 4	Set 5	Total	Report
20 Jul	17:30	Japan	3–2	Russia	18–25	26–24	25–13	18–25	15–12	102–99	P2
20 Jul	20:00	Italy	3–2	Turkey	19–25	24–26	25–21	25–16	18–16	111–104	P2

==== 3rd-place match ====
Date	Time		Score		Set 1	Set 2	Set 3	Set 4	Set 5	Total	Report
21 Jul	17:30	Russia	3–1	Turkey	25–22	26–28	25–19	29–27		105–96	P2

==== Final ====
Date	Time		Score		Set 1	Set 2	Set 3	Set 4	Set 5	Total	Report
21 Jul	20:00	Japan	3–2	Italy	23–25	21–25	25–20	25–19	15–12	109–101	P2

== Final standing ==
Rank	Team
1st place, gold medalist(s)	Japan
2nd place, silver medalist(s)	Italy
3rd place, bronze medalist(s)	Russia
4	Turkey
5	Poland
6	Brazil
7	China
8	United States
9	Serbia
10	Mexico
11	Argentina
12	Peru
13	Dominican Republic
14	Cuba
15	Egypt
16	Rwanda

2019 Women's U20 World champions

Japan
1st title

12–man roster
Miyu Nakagawa, Nichika Yamada, Mayu Ishikawa (c), Shion Hirayama, Yuki Nishikawa, Haruna Soga, Ameze Miyabe, Ayaka Araki, Minami Nishimura, Rena Mizusugi, Kanon Sonoda, Tsukasa Nakagawa
Head coach
Aihara Noboru

== Awards ==
- Most valuable player
  (Japan) Mayu Ishikawa
- Best setter
  (Japan) Tsukasa Nakagawa
- Best outside spikers
  (Japan) Haruna Soga
  (Japan) Mayu Ishikawa
- Best middle blockers
  (Russia) Yulia Brovkina
  (Turkey) Merve Atlıer
- Best opposite spiker
  (Italy) Terry Enweonwu
- Best libero
  (China) Ni Feifan

== See also ==
- 2019 FIVB Volleyball Men's U21 World Championship
