= China women's national under-21 volleyball team =

Youth volleyball team representing China

China
- Association: Chinese Volleyball Association
- Confederation: AVC

Uniforms
Home	Away	Third

FIVB U21 World Championship
- Appearances: 21 (First in 1977)
- Best result: (gold) Gold : (1995, 2013, 2017, 2023)

AVC U20 Asian Championship
- Appearances: 17 (First in 1984)
- Best result: (gold) Gold : (1992, 1994, 1996, 1998, 2000, 2002, 2004, 2006, 2010, 2012, 2014, 2016).

The China women's national under-20 volleyball team represents China in women's under-20 volleyball events, it is controlled and managed by the Chinese Volleyball Association that is a member of Asian volleyball body Asian Volleyball Confederation (AVC) and the international volleyball body government the Fédération Internationale de Volleyball (FIVB).

== Results ==
=== FIVB U20 World Championship ===
Champions Runners up Third place Fourth place

FIVB U20 World Championship
Year	Round	Position	GP	MW	ML	SW	SL	Squad
(Brazil) 1977	Final	Runners-Up						Squad
(Mexico) 1981		5th place						Squad
(Italy) 1985	Semifinals	Third place						Squad
(South Korea) 1987	Semifinals	Third place						Squad
(Peru) 1989		5th place						Squad
(Czechoslovakia) 1991	Semifinals	4th place						Squad
(Brazil) 1993		9th place						Squad
(Thailand) 1995	Final	1st place						Squad
(Poland) 1997	Semifinals	Third place						Squad
(Canada) 1999	Semifinals	4th place						Squad
(Dominican Republic) 2001	Semifinals	Third place						Squad
(Thailand) 2003	Final	Runners-Up						Squad
(Turkey) 2005	Semifinals	Third place						Squad
(Thailand) 2007	Final	Runners-Up						Squad
(Mexico) 2009		10th place						Squad
(Peru) 2011	Semifinals	Third place						Squad
(Czech Republic) 2013	Final	1st place						Squad
(Puerto Rico) 2015		9th place						Squad
(Mexico) 2017	Final	1st place						Squad
(Mexico) 2019		7th place						Squad
(Belgium) (Netherlands) 2021	withdrew							
(Mexico) 2023	Final	1st place						
Total	4 Titles	21/22	—	—	—	—	—	—

== Team ==
=== Current squad ===
The following is the Chinese roster in the 2017 FIVB Volleyball Women's U20 World Championship.

Head Coach: Shen Mang

No.	Name	Date of birth	Height	Weight	Spike	Block	2017 club
2	Yang Hanyu	12 October 1999	1.92 m (6 ft 4 in)	72 kg (159 lb)	317 cm (125 in)	311 cm (122 in)	(China) Shandong
3	Chen Peiyan	16 September 1999	1.93 m (6 ft 4 in)	79 kg (174 lb)	318 cm (125 in)	309 cm (122 in)	(China) Guangdong
5	Cai Yaqian (C)	29 June 1998	1.79 m (5 ft 10 in)	69 kg (152 lb)	315 cm (124 in)	308 cm (121 in)	(China) Shandong
6	Zhang Yuqian	18 August 1998	1.85 m (6 ft 1 in)	72 kg (159 lb)	302 cm (119 in)	294 cm (116 in)	(China) Shanghai
7	Xie Xing	28 November 1998	1.84 m (6 ft 0 in)	68 kg (150 lb)	271 cm (107 in)	265 cm (104 in)	(China) Jiangsu
9	Guan Ruige	25 October 1998	1.88 m (6 ft 2 in)	71 kg (157 lb)	311 cm (122 in)	303 cm (119 in)	(China) Beijing
10	Zang Qianqian	14 August 1998	1.74 m (5 ft 9 in)	60 kg (130 lb)	271 cm (107 in)	265 cm (104 in)	(China) Jiangsu
11	Cai Xiaoqing	5 April 1998	1.79 m (5 ft 10 in)	71 kg (157 lb)	305 cm (120 in)	295 cm (116 in)	(China) Henan
12	Wu Han	23 April 1998	1.83 m (6 ft 0 in)	64 kg (141 lb)	294 cm (116 in)	284 cm (112 in)	(China) Jiangsu
14	Fang Jing	27 July 1999	1.77 m (5 ft 10 in)	67 kg (148 lb)	297 cm (117 in)	291 cm (115 in)	(China) Zhejiang
16	Xu Xiaoting	21 January 1998	1.83 m (6 ft 0 in)	72 kg (159 lb)	308 cm (121 in)	300 cm (120 in)	(China) Shanghai
17	Liu Jiayuan	9 May 1998	1.81 m (5 ft 11 in)	80 kg (180 lb)	281 cm (111 in)	276 cm (109 in)	(China) Shandong

=== Notable players ===
- Zhu Ting (2011–2012)
- Yang Hanyu (2016–2017)
