= Spain women's national under-21 volleyball team =

Spain U20
- Association: Real Federación Española de Voleibol
- Confederation: CEV

Uniforms
Home	Away	Third

FIVB U21 World Championship
- Appearances: 3 (First in 1977)
- Best result: 13th place : (1981)

CEV Europe U19 Championship
- Appearances: 4 (First in 1979)
- Best result: 6th place : (2000)
- Website

The Spain women's national under-20 volleyball team represents Spain in under-20 international women's volleyball competitions and friendly matches, It is ruled and managed by The Spanish Royal Volleyball Federation That is an affiliate of International Volleyball Federation FIVB and also a part of European Volleyball Confederation CEV.

== Results ==
=== FIVB U20 World Championship ===
Champions Runners up Third place Fourth place

FIVB U20 World Championship
Year	Round	Position	Pld	W	L	SW	SL	Squad
(Brazil) 1977		14th place						Squad
(Mexico) 1981		13th place						Squad
(Italy) 1985	Didn't qualify							
(South Korea) 1987	Didn't qualify							
(Peru) 1989		14th place						Squad
(Czechoslovakia) 1991	Didn't qualify							
(Brazil) 1993	Didn't qualify							
(Thailand) 1995	Didn't qualify							
(Poland) 1997	Didn't qualify							
(Canada) 1999	Didn't qualify							
(Dominican Republic) 2001	Didn't qualify							
(Thailand) 2003	Didn't qualify							
(Turkey) 2005	Didn't qualify							
(Thailand) 2007	Didn't qualify							
(Mexico) 2009	Didn't qualify							
(Peru) 2011	Didn't qualify							
(Czech Republic) 2013	Didn't qualify							
(Puerto Rico) 2015	Didn't qualify							
(Mexico) 2017	Didn't qualify							
Total	0 Titles	3/19						

=== Europe U19 Championship ===
Champions Runners up Third place Fourth place

Europe U19 Championship
Year	Round	Position	Pld	W	L	SW	SL	Squad
(Hungary) 1966	Didn't qualify							
(Soviet Union) 1969	Didn't qualify							
(Italy) 1971	Didn't qualify							
(Netherlands) 1973	Didn't qualify							
(West Germany) 1975	Didn't qualify							
(Socialist Federal Republic of Yugoslavia) 1977	Didn't qualify							
(Spain) 1979		10th place						Squad
(West Germany) 1982		12th place						Squad
(France) 1984	Didn't qualify							
(Bulgaria) 1986	Didn't qualify							
(Italy) 1988	Didn't qualify							
(Austria) 1990	Didn't qualify							
(Greece) 1992	Didn't qualify							
(Hungary) 1994	Didn't qualify							
(Turkey) 1996		12th place						Squad
(Belgium) 1998	Didn't qualify							

Europe U19 Championship
Year	Round	Position	Pld	W	L	SW	SL	Squad
(Switzerland) 2000		6th place						Squad
(Croatia) 2002	Didn't qualify							
(Slovakia) 2004	Didn't qualify							
(France) 2006	Didn't qualify							
(Italy) 2008	Didn't qualify							
(Serbia) 2010	Didn't qualify							
(Turkey) 2012	Didn't qualify							
(Finland) / (Estonia) 2014	Didn't qualify							
(Hungary) / (Slovakia) 2016	Didn't qualify							
(Albania) 2018	Didn't qualify							
Total	0 Titles	4/26						

== Team ==
=== Current squad ===
The following is the Spanish roster in the 2016 European U19 Championship.

Head coach: (Spain) Jose Miguel Serrato

#	Name	Year of birth	Height	Weight	Spike	Block
1	Cristina Pérez	28 November 1998	1.72 m (5 ft 8 in)	63 kg (139 lb)	000 cm (0 in)	000 cm (0 in)
2	Anna Grima	22 August 1998	1.86 m (6 ft 1 in)	75 kg (165 lb)	000 cm (0 in)	000 cm (0 in)
3	Aina Berbel	28 November 1999	1.84 m (6 ft 0 in)	67 kg (148 lb)	000 cm (0 in)	000 cm (0 in)
4	Clara Barcelo	13 November 1998	1.64 m (5 ft 5 in)	56 kg (123 lb)	000 cm (0 in)	000 cm (0 in)
5	Paola Vela Martínez	28 March 1998	1.82 m (6 ft 0 in)	71 kg (157 lb)	000 cm (0 in)	000 cm (0 in)
6	Emma Ordoñez	28 November 1999	1.82 m (6 ft 0 in)	62 kg (137 lb)	000 cm (0 in)	000 cm (0 in)
7	Ana Escamilla	15 January 1998	1.83 m (6 ft 0 in)	70 kg (150 lb)	000 cm (0 in)	000 cm (0 in)
8	Paula Carpintero	28 August 1999	1.78 m (5 ft 10 in)	69 kg (152 lb)	000 cm (0 in)	000 cm (0 in)
9	Raquel Lazaro	14 June 2000	1.80 m (5 ft 11 in)	62 kg (137 lb)	000 cm (0 in)	000 cm (0 in)
10	Andrea Pedro Martínez	28 November 1998	1.79 m (5 ft 10 in)	67 kg (148 lb)	000 cm (0 in)	000 cm (0 in)
11	Victoria Margarida Pizà	28 November 2000	1.63 m (5 ft 4 in)	57 kg (126 lb)	000 cm (0 in)	000 cm (0 in)
12	Alejandra Olalla	21 February 1998	1.83 m (6 ft 0 in)	64 kg (141 lb)	000 cm (0 in)	000 cm (0 in)
13	Lucia Ballve	28 November 1999	1.83 m (6 ft 0 in)	72 kg (159 lb)	000 cm (0 in)	000 cm (0 in)
14	Lucia Prol	10 September 1999	1.75 m (5 ft 9 in)	71 kg (157 lb)	000 cm (0 in)	000 cm (0 in)
15	Sara Mendoza	13 October 1998	1.75 m (5 ft 9 in)	60 kg (130 lb)	000 cm (0 in)	000 cm (0 in)
16	Andrea Bové	3 September 1999	1.69 m (5 ft 7 in)	62 kg (137 lb)	000 cm (0 in)	000 cm (0 in)
17	Ada Guilera	3 October 1999	1.80 m (5 ft 11 in)	67 kg (148 lb)	000 cm (0 in)	000 cm (0 in)
18	Maria Del Mar Calvo	28 November 1998	1.81 m (5 ft 11 in)	61 kg (134 lb)	000 cm (0 in)	000 cm (0 in)
19	Sol Guadalupe Rosell	25 July 2000	1.82 m (6 ft 0 in)	71 kg (157 lb)	000 cm (0 in)	000 cm (0 in)
20	Erika García González	27 October 1998	1.80 m (5 ft 11 in)	78 kg (172 lb)	000 cm (0 in)	000 cm (0 in)
21	Elsa Van Hulst	4 July 1998	1.82 m (6 ft 0 in)	62 kg (137 lb)	000 cm (0 in)	000 cm (0 in)
22	Berta Vela	9 July 1998	1.79 m (5 ft 10 in)	74 kg (163 lb)	000 cm (0 in)	000 cm (0 in)
