= Portugal women's national under-21 volleyball team =

Portugal U20
- Association: Federação Portuguesa de Voleibol
- Confederation: CEV

Uniforms
Home	Away	Third

FIVB U21 World Championship
- Appearances: No Appearances

Europe U19 Championship
- Appearances: No Appearances
- www.fpvoleibol.pt (in Portuguese)

The Portugal women's national under-20 volleyball team represents Portugal in international women's volleyball competitions and friendly matches under the age 20 and it is ruled by the Federação Portuguesa de Voleibol That is an affiliate of Federation of International Volleyball FIVB and also a part of European Volleyball Confederation CEV.

== Results ==
=== FIVB U21 World Championship ===
Champions Runners up Third place Fourth place

FIVB U21 World Championship
Year	Round	Position	Pld	W	L	SW	SL	Squad
(Brazil) 1977	Didn't qualify → ←							
(Belgium) (Netherlands) 2021	Didn't qualify → ←							
Total	0 Titles	0/21						

=== Europe Junior Championship ===
Champions Runners up Third place Fourth place

Europe Junior Championship
Year	Round	Position	Pld	W	L	SW	SL	Squad
(Hungary) → 1966	Didn't qualify							
(Finland) / (Estonia) ← 2014	Didn't qualify							
2016 Q	Second Round	4th Placed						Squad
2018 Q	Second Round	4th Placed						Squad
2020 Q	Didn't Enter							
2022 Q	Didn't Enter							
Total	0 Titles	0/27						

== Team ==
=== Current squad ===
The Following players is the Portuguese players that Competed in the 2018 Women's U19 Volleyball European Championship

#	name	position	height	weight	birthday	spike	block
	basto beatriz	libero	158	53	2001.1.1	235	215
	braga catarina	setter	180	56	2000.11.8	270	260
	bras mafalda	opposite	180	65	2003.9.3	275	255
	campos rita	libero	170	50	2003.3.3	265	243
	candeias catarina	outside-spiker	170	59	2000.11.28	265	260
	cavalcanti amanda	middle-blocker	183	62	2002.4.17	284	260
	clemente alice	opposite	182	62	2003.1.3	278	243
	fernandes margarida	middle-blocker	177	62	2001.11.28	272	263
	ferreira daniela	opposite	184	76	2001.8.10	250	240
	lopes ana	middle-blocker	178	78	2000.11.28	255	235
	lopes maria	outside-spiker	183	68	2002.8.26	260	250
	matos maria	outside-spiker	176	66	2001.1.29	270	266
	moreira beatriz	middle-blocker	185	59	2001.5.2	282	276
	moreira mariana	opposite	177	62	2002.2.2	258	245
	mouta matilde	setter	172	57	2003.11.28	240	235
	pedrosa margarida	middle-blocker	178	60	2001.7.16	280	268
	pereira marlene	middle-blocker	180	70	2002.6.29	280	265
	pinheiro beatriz	outside-spiker	175	60	2000.11.28	286	281
	rodrigues beatriz	outside-spiker	180	60	2001.11.28	265	260
	rodrigues carolina	outside-spiker	183	63	2001.8.7	255	235
	rodrigues matilde	outside-spiker	172	52	2000.4.29	267	256
	santos maria	setter	168	57	2001.4.22	236	230
	teixeira matilde	outside-spiker	177	65	2003.5.1	275	270
	vale ana	outside-spiker	183	60	2001.3.29	280	255
	vasconcelos mariana	outside-spiker	174	64	2001.5.1	285	280
	veiga susana	opposite	174	63	2000.12.16	288	276
