= Italy women's national under-21 volleyball team =

Italy U21
- Association: Italian Volleyball Federation (FIPAV)
- Confederation: CEV
- Head coach: Gaetano Gagliardi

Uniforms
Home	Away	Third

FIVB U21 World Championship
- Appearances: 18 (First in 1985)
- Best result: (2011, 2021, 2025)

European U20 Championship
- Appearances: 27 (First in 1969)
- Best result: (1996, 1998, 2004, 2006, 2008, 2010, 2018, 2022)

The Italy women's national under-21 volleyball team represents Italy in international women's volleyball competitions and friendly matches under the age 20 & 21 and it is ruled by the Italian Volleyball Federation That is an affiliate of International Volleyball Federation FIVB and also a part of European Volleyball Confederation CEV.

== Competition record ==
=== FIVB U21 World Championship ===
Champions Runners-up Third place Fourth place

FIVB U21 World Championship
Year	Round	Position	Pld	W	L	SW	SL	Squad
(Brazil) 1977	Did not compete							
(Mexico) 1981	Did not compete							
(Italy) 1985		7th place						Squad
(South Korea) 1987	Did not qualify							
(Peru) 1989		7th place						Squad
(Czechoslovakia) 1991		7th place						Squad
(Brazil) 1993		5th place						Squad
(Thailand) 1995		6th place						Squad
(Poland) 1997	Final	Runners-up						Squad
(Canada) 1999		9th place						Squad
(Dominican Republic) 2001	Semifinals	4th place						Squad
(Thailand) 2003	Did not qualify							
(Turkey) 2005	Semifinals	4th place						Squad
(Thailand) 2007		5th place						Squad
(Mexico) 2009	Did not qualify							
(Peru) 2011	Final	Champions	8	7	1	22	6	Squad
(Czech Republic) 2013		4th place						Squad
(Puerto Rico) 2015	Semifinals	3rd place						Squad
(Mexico) 2017		9th place						Squad
(Mexico) 2019	Final	Runners-up						Squad
(Belgium) (Netherlands) 2021	Final	Champions	8	8	0	24	2	Squad
(Mexico) 2023	Final	Runners up						Squad
(Indonesia) 2025	Final	Champions	9	8	1	26	8	Squad
Total	3 Titles	18/23						—

=== Europe U20 Championship ===
Champions Runners-up Third place Fourth place

Europe U20 Championship
Year	Round	Position	Pld	W	L	SW	SL	Squad
(Hungary) 1966	Didn't compete							
(Soviet Union) 1969		9th place						Squad
(Italy) 1971		7th place						Squad
(Netherlands) 1973		10th place						Squad
(West Germany) 1975		8th place						Squad
(Socialist Federal Republic of Yugoslavia) 1977		6th place						Squad
(Spain) 1979		6th place						Squad
(West Germany) 1982		5th place						Squad
(France) 1984		Runners-up						Squad
(Bulgaria) 1986		10th place						Squad
(Italy) 1988		Runners-up						Squad
(Austria) 1990		4th place						Squad
(Greece) 1992		Third place						Squad
(Hungary) 1994		Runners-up						Squad
(Turkey) 1996		Champions						Squad
(Belgium) 1998		Champions						Squad

Europe U20 Championship
Year	Round	Position	Pld	W	L	SW	SL	Squad
(Switzerland) 2000		Runners-up						Squad
(Croatia) 2002		7th place						Squad
(Slovakia) 2004		Champions						Squad
(France) 2006		Champions						Squad
(Italy) 2008		Champions						Squad
(Serbia) 2010		Champions						Squad
(Turkey) 2012		Third place						Squad
(Finland) / (Estonia) 2014		9th place						Squad
(Hungary) / (Slovakia) 2016		5th place						Squad
(Albania) 2018	Final	Champions						Squad
(Bosnia and Herzegovina) / (Croatia) 2020	Withdrew							
(North Macedonia) 2022	Final	Champions						Squad
(Bulgaria) (Republic of Ireland) 2024	Final	Runners up						Squad
Total	8 Titles	27/29						

== Team ==
=== Current squad ===
The following is the Italian roster in the 2025 U21 World Championship.

Head coach: (Italy) Gaetano Gagliardi

No.	Name	Date of birth	Height	Weight	Spike	Block	2025 club
2	Nicole Piomboni	22 November 2005	1.80 m (5 ft 11 in)	0 kg (0 lb)	0 cm (0 in)	0 cm (0 in)	(Italy) CBF Balducci HR Macerata
3	Dalila Marchesini	3 January 2006	1.88 m (6 ft 2 in)	0 kg (0 lb)	322 cm (127 in)	293 cm (115 in)	(Italy) Altino Volley
5	Teresa Maria Bosso	6 January 2005	1.82 m (6 ft 0 in)	0 kg (0 lb)	0 cm (0 in)	0 cm (0 in)	(Italy) Roma Volley
6	Helena Sassolini	14 January 2005	1.81 m (5 ft 11 in)	0 kg (0 lb)	0 cm (0 in)	0 cm (0 in)	(Italy) Futura Volley Giovani
8	Erika Esposito	1 February 2006	1.85 m (6 ft 1 in)	0 kg (0 lb)	0 cm (0 in)	0 cm (0 in)	(Italy) Nuvolì AltaFratte Padova
9	Silene Martinelli	8 September 2006	1.90 m (6 ft 3 in)	0 kg (0 lb)	0 cm (0 in)	0 cm (0 in)	(Italy) Volley Offanengo
10	Anna Bardaro	29 April 2005	1.79 m (5 ft 10 in)	0 kg (0 lb)	296 cm (117 in)	288 cm (113 in)	(Italy) Cuneo Granda Volley
11	Merit Adigwe	24 August 2006	1.82 m (6 ft 0 in)	0 kg (0 lb)	0 cm (0 in)	0 cm (0 in)	(Italy) Imoco Volley
12	Lisa Esposito	25 September 2005	1.86 m (6 ft 1 in)	0 kg (0 lb)	0 cm (0 in)	0 cm (0 in)	(Italy) Nuvolì AltaFratte Padova
14	Emma Magnabosco	26 May 2006	1.81 m (5 ft 11 in)	0 kg (0 lb)	0 cm (0 in)	0 cm (0 in)	(Italy) Club Italia
15	Linda Manfredini	14 May 2006	1.88 m (6 ft 2 in)	0 kg (0 lb)	0 cm (0 in)	0 cm (0 in)	(Italy) Volley Bergamo
17	Adji Ndoye	3 April 2006	1.83 m (6 ft 0 in)	0 kg (0 lb)	0 cm (0 in)	0 cm (0 in)	(Italy) Altino Volley
