= 2021 FIVB Volleyball Women's U20 World Championship =

20th edition of the FIVB Volleyball Women's U20 World Championship

Tournament details
- Host country: Belgium; Netherlands
- Dates: 9–18 July 2021
- Teams: 16 (from 5 confederations)

Final positions
- Champions: Italy (2nd title)
- Runners-up: Serbia
- Third place: Russia
- Fourth place: Netherlands

Tournament awards
- MVP: (Italy) Gaia Guiducci
- Best Setter: (Italy) Gaia Guiducci
- Best OH: (Italy) Loveth Omoruyi (Netherlands) Jolien Knollema
- Best MB: (Italy) Emma Graziani (Serbia) Hena Kurtagić
- Best OPP: (Russia) Vita Akimova
- Best Libero: (Italy) Martina Armini

The 2021 FIVB Volleyball Women's U20 World Championship was the 21st edition of the FIVB Volleyball Women's U20 World Championship, contested by the women's national teams under the age of 20 of the members of the Fédération Internationale de Volleyball (FIVB), the sport's global governing body. The final tournament was held in Belgium and Netherlands, making it the first time that the tournament was jointly hosted by more than one country.

The defending champions, Japan, withdrew from the event.

== Qualification ==
A total of 16 teams qualified for the final tournament. In addition to Belgium and Netherlands, who qualified automatically as the hosts, another 10 teams qualified via five separate continental tournaments which were required to be held by 31 December 2020 at the latest. However, due to the ongoing global COVID-19 pandemic and the subsequent impact on some Confederations’ ability to organize the events within the given deadline, the FIVB decided to postpone the deadline for continental qualifications to 28 February 2021. Additionally, in the case of no Continental Confederations being able to hold qualifying events, teams were to qualify according to the respective Continental Rankings. The remaining 4 teams qualified via the FIVB Junior World Ranking.

Means of qualification	Date	Venue	Vacancies	Qualifier
Host countries	13 October 2020	(Switzerland) Lausanne	2	Belgium Netherlands
2020 European Championship	22–30 August 2020	(Bosnia and Herzegovina) Zenica (Croatia) Osijek	2	Turkey Serbia
2018 Asian Championship	10–17 June 2018	(Vietnam) Bac Ninh and Tu Son	~~2~~ 1*	~~Japan~~ ~~China~~ Thailand
~~2020 NORCECA Championship~~	~~14–22 February 2021~~	~~United States~~	2	Dominican Republic ~~Cuba~~ Puerto Rico**
~~2020 African Championship~~	~~18–26 February 2021~~	~~(Uganda) Kampala~~	2	Egypt Rwanda
~~2020 South American Championship~~		~~Brazil~~	2	Brazil Argentina
FIVB Junior World Ranking	As per 1 March 2021	(Switzerland) Lausanne	4+1*	Italy Russia Poland United States Belarus
Total			16	

* China and Japan withdrew from the competition. Thailand entered by the 3rd place at the Asian Volleyball Championship and Belarus entered by the world ranking.

** Cuba was forced to withdraw from the competition due to COVID-19 infections and was replaced by Puerto Rico.

== Pools composition ==
Teams were seeded in the first two positions of each pool following the serpentine system according to their FIVB U20 World Ranking as of 1 March 2021. FIVB reserved the right to seed the hosts as head of pools A and B regardless of the U20 World Ranking. All teams not seeded were drawn to take other available positions in the remaining lines, following the U20 World Ranking. The draw was held on 14 June 2021. Rankings are shown in brackets except the hosts who ranked both 22nd.

Seeded teams		Pot 1	Pot 2
Netherlands (Hosts); Belgium (Hosts); Turkey (1); Italy (3)	Russia (4); Poland (5); Serbia (6); Brazil (7)	United States (9); Belarus (10); Argentina (12); Dominican Republic (15)	~~Cuba (16)~~*; Egypt (17); Rwanda (18); Thailand (44)

Pool A	Pool B	Pool C	Pool D
Netherlands	Belgium	Turkey	Italy
Brazil	Serbia	Russia**	Poland**
Argentina**	Dominican Republic**	United States	Belarus
Rwanda	Puerto Rico**	Thailand	Egypt

* Cuba withdrew due to COVID-19 concerns and was replaced by Puerto Rico.

** The teams changed their groups after the draw because a policy about immigration of Belgium ban the people from Argentina, Brazil and Russia.

== Venues ==
(Netherlands) Rotterdam (Pool A, Pool C, Pool E, Pool G)	(Belgium) Kortrijk (Pool B, Pool D, Pool F, Pool H)
Sportcentrum Schuttersveld	Sportcampus Lange Munte
Capacity: 5000	Capacity: 5000
No Image	No Image

== Pool standing procedure ==
1. Number of matches won
2. Match points
3. Sets ratio
4. Points ratio
5. If the tie continues as per the point ratio between two teams, the priority will be given to the team which won the last match between them. When the tie in points ratio is between three or more teams, a new classification of these teams in the terms of points 1, 2, and 3 will be made taking into consideration only the matches in which they were opposed to each other.

Match won 3–0 or 3–1: 3 match points for the winner, 0 match points for the loser
Match won 3–2: 2 match points for the winner, 1 match point for the loser

== Preliminary round ==
- All times are Central European Summer Time (UTC+02:00).

=== Pool A ===
Pos	Team	Pld	W	L	Pts	SW	SL	SR	SPW	SPL	SPR	Qualification
1	Netherlands	3	3	0	9	9	1	9.000	249	165	1.509	Second round Pool E
2	Brazil	3	2	1	6	7	3	2.333	240	198	1.212	Second round Pool E
3	Argentina	3	1	2	3	3	6	0.500	208	195	1.067	Second round Pool G
4	Rwanda	3	0	3	0	0	9	0.000	86	225	0.382	Second round Pool G

Date	Time		Score		Set 1	Set 2	Set 3	Set 4	Set 5	Total	Report
9 July	14:30	Argentina	0–3	Brazil	24–26	24–26	24–26			72–78	P2Report
9 July	17:30	Netherlands	3–0	Rwanda	25–6	25–5	25–6			75–17	P2Report
10 July	14:30	Rwanda	0–3	Brazil	10–25	15–25	2–25			27–75	P2Report
10 July	17:30	Netherlands	3–0	Argentina	25–18	25–21	25–22			75–61	P2Report
11 July	14:30	Argentina	3–0	Rwanda	25–18	25–10	25–14			75–42	P2Report
11 July	17:30	Brazil	1–3	Netherlands	25–22	21–25	16–25	25–27		87–99	P2Report

=== Pool B ===
Pos	Team	Pld	W	L	Pts	SW	SL	SR	SPW	SPL	SPR	Qualification
1	Serbia	3	3	0	9	9	0	MAX	225	97	2.320	Second round Pool F
2	Dominican Republic	3	2	1	6	6	3	2.000	205	132	1.553	Second round Pool F
3	Belgium	3	1	2	3	3	6	0.500	179	150	1.193	Second round Pool H
4	Puerto Rico (Note: Puerto Rico was forced to withdraw after several team members tested positive for COVID-19 and their games were forfeited.)	3	0	3	0	0	9	0.000	0	225	0.000	Second round Pool H

Notes:

Date	Time		Score		Set 1	Set 2	Set 3	Set 4	Set 5	Total	Report
9 July	13:00	Puerto Rico	0–3	Dominican Republic	0–25	0–25	0–25			0–75	Report
9 July	18:00	Belgium	0–3	Serbia	17–25	10–25	15–25			42–75	P2Report
10 July	13:00	Belgium	3–0	Puerto Rico	25–0	25–0	25–0			75–0	Report
10 July	15:00	Serbia	3–0	Dominican Republic	25–18	25–20	25–17			75–55	P2Report
11 July	13:00	Serbia	3–0	Puerto Rico	25–0	25–0	25–0			75–0	Report
11 July	18:00	Dominican Republic	3–0	Belgium	25–19	25–21	25–17			75–57	P2Report

=== Pool C ===
Pos	Team	Pld	W	L	Pts	SW	SL	SR	SPW	SPL	SPR	Qualification
1	United States	3	3	0	9	9	1	9.000	250	177	1.412	Second round Pool E
2	Russia	3	2	1	6	7	4	1.750	247	241	1.025	Second round Pool E
3	Turkey	3	1	2	3	4	6	0.667	224	230	0.974	Second round Pool G
4	Thailand	3	0	3	0	0	9	0.000	152	225	0.676	Second round Pool G

Date	Time		Score		Set 1	Set 2	Set 3	Set 4	Set 5	Total	Report
9 July	15:30	Turkey	3–0	Thailand	25–20	25–18	25–19			75–57	P2Report
9 July	18:30	Russia	1–3	United States	20–25	25–23	14–25	17–25		76–98	P2Report
10 July	15:00	Thailand	0–3	United States	15–25	8–25	13–25			36–75	P2Report
10 July	18:30	Turkey	1–3	Russia	23–25	25–21	19–25	17–25		84–96	P2Report
11 July	15:00	Russia	3–0	Thailand	25–23	25–20	25–16			75–59	P2Report
11 July	18:30	United States	3–0	Turkey	25–18	27–25	25–22			77–65	P2Report

=== Pool D ===
Pos	Team	Pld	W	L	Pts	SW	SL	SR	SPW	SPL	SPR	Qualification
1	Italy	3	3	0	9	9	1	9.000	235	181	1.298	Second round Pool F
2	Poland	3	2	1	6	7	3	2.333	221	186	1.188	Second round Pool F
3	Belarus	3	1	2	2	3	8	0.375	217	260	0.835	Second round Pool H
4	Egypt	3	0	3	1	2	9	0.222	210	256	0.820	Second round Pool H

Date	Time		Score		Set 1	Set 2	Set 3	Set 4	Set 5	Total	Report
9 July	15:00	Poland	3–0	Belarus	25–14	25–19	25–17			75–50	P2Report
9 July	20:30	Italy	3–0	Egypt	25–15	25–19	25–15			75–49	P2Report
10 July	15:30	Italy	3–1	Poland	25–16	10–25	25–21	25–9		85–71	P2Report
10 July	20:30	Egypt	2–3	Belarus	23–25	26–24	21–25	25–15	15–17	110–106	P2Report
11 July	15:30	Belarus	0–3	Italy	23–25	17–25	21–25			61–75	P2Report
11 July	20:30	Poland	3–0	Egypt	25–11	25–23	25–17			75–51	P2Report

== Second round ==
- All times are Central European Summer Time (UTC+02:00).

=== Classification 1–8 ===
==== Pool E ====
Pos	Team	Pld	W	L	Pts	SW	SL	SR	SPW	SPL	SPR	Qualification
1	Netherlands	3	3	0	8	9	3	3.000	273	235	1.162	Semifinals
2	Russia	3	2	1	6	7	4	1.750	261	230	1.135	Semifinals
3	United States	3	1	2	4	6	7	0.857	287	295	0.973	5th–8th semifinals
4	Brazil	3	0	3	0	1	9	0.111	191	252	0.758	5th–8th semifinals

Date	Time		Score		Set 1	Set 2	Set 3	Set 4	Set 5	Total	Report
13 July	14:30	Brazil	1–3	United States	22–25	29–27	20–25	14–25		85–102	P2Report
13 July	17:30	Netherlands	3–1	Russia	25–16	25–20	16–25	25–22		91–83	P2Report
14 July	14:30	Russia	3–1	United States	25–13	25–22	28–30	25–23		103–88	P2Report
14 July	17:30	Netherlands	3–0	Brazil	25–20	25–17	25–18			75–55	P2Report
15 July	14:30	Brazil	0–3	Russia	18–25	16–25	17–25			51–75	P2Report
15 July	17:30	United States	2–3	Netherlands	15–25	22–25	25–21	25–21	10–15	97–107	P2Report

==== Pool F ====
Pos	Team	Pld	W	L	Pts	SW	SL	SR	SPW	SPL	SPR	Qualification
1	Italy	3	3	0	9	9	1	9.000	246	188	1.309	Semifinals
2	Serbia	3	2	1	6	6	3	2.000	215	193	1.114	Semifinals
3	Poland	3	1	2	3	4	6	0.667	218	221	0.986	5th–8th semifinals
4	Dominican Republic	3	0	3	0	0	9	0.000	148	225	0.658	5th–8th semifinals

Date	Time		Score		Set 1	Set 2	Set 3	Set 4	Set 5	Total	Report
13 July	15:00	Serbia	3–0	Poland	25–21	27–25	25–23			77–69	P2Report
13 July	17:30	Dominican Republic	0–3	Italy	16–25	20–25	15–25			51–75	P2Report
14 July	15:00	Italy	3–1	Poland	25–12	19–25	27–25	25–12		96–74	P2Report
14 July	17:30	Serbia	3–0	Dominican Republic	25–13	25–18	25–18			75–49	P2Report
15 July	15:00	Dominican Republic	0–3	Poland	21–25	11–25	16–25			48–75	P2Report
15 July	17:30	Serbia	0–3	Italy	23–25	18–25	22–25			63–75	P2Report

=== Classification 9–16 ===
==== Pool G ====
Pos	Team	Pld	W	L	Pts	SW	SL	SR	SPW	SPL	SPR	Qualification
1	Turkey	3	3	0	9	9	0	MAX	225	143	1.573	9th–12th semifinals
2	Argentina	3	2	1	6	6	3	2.000	204	152	1.342	9th–12th semifinals
3	Thailand	3	1	2	3	3	6	0.500	172	196	0.878	13th–16th semifinals
4	Rwanda	3	0	3	0	0	9	0.000	115	225	0.511	13th–16th semifinals

Date	Time		Score		Set 1	Set 2	Set 3	Set 4	Set 5	Total	Report
13 July	15:30	Rwanda	0–3	Turkey	10–25	9–25	16–25			35–75	P2Report
13 July	18:30	Argentina	3–0	Thailand	25–13	25–12	25–18			75–43	P2Report
14 July	15:30	Rwanda	0–3	Argentina	12–25	7–25	15–25			34–75	P2Report
14 July	18:30	Turkey	3–0	Thailand	25–17	25–16	25–21			75–54	P2Report
15 July	15:30	Rwanda	0–3	Thailand	14–25	16–25	16–25			46–75	P2Report
15 July	18:30	Turkey	3–0	Argentina	25–10	25–22	25–22			75–54	P2Report

==== Pool H ====
Pos	Team	Pld	W	L	Pts	SW	SL	SR	SPW	SPL	SPR	Qualification
1	Belarus	3	3	0	9	9	0	MAX	225	79	2.848	9th–12th semifinals
2	Egypt	3	2	1	5	6	5	1.200	230	179	1.285	9th–12th semifinals
3	Belgium	3	1	2	4	5	6	0.833	213	185	1.151	13th–16th semifinals
4	Puerto Rico	3	0	3	0	0	9	0.000	0	225	0.000	13th–16th semifinals

Date	Time		Score		Set 1	Set 2	Set 3	Set 4	Set 5	Total	Report
13 July	13:00	Puerto Rico	0–3	Belarus	0–25	0–25	0–25			0–75	Report
13 July	20:00	Belgium	2–3	Egypt	20–25	25–18	29–27	21–25	9–15	104–110	P2Report
14 July	13:00	Belgium	3–0	Puerto Rico	25–0	25–0	25–0			75–0	Report
14 July	20:00	Belarus	3–0	Egypt	25–18	25–15	25–12			75–45	P2Report
15 July	13:00	Puerto Rico	0–3	Egypt	0–25	0–25	0–25			0–75	Report
15 July	20:00	Belgium	0–3	Belarus	16–25	7–25	11–25			34–75	P2Report

== Final round ==
- All times are Central European Summer Time (UTC+02:00).

=== Classification 13th–16th ===
13th–16th semifinals
17 July
Thailand	3
Puerto Rico	0
17 July
Belgium	3
Rwanda	0

13th place match
18 July
Thailand	0
Belgium	3
15th place match
18 July
Puerto Rico	0
Rwanda	3

==== 13th–16th semifinals ====
Date	Time		Score		Set 1	Set 2	Set 3	Set 4	Set 5	Total	Report
17 July	13:00	Thailand	3–0	Puerto Rico	25–0	25–0	25–0			75–0	Report
17 July	20:30	Belgium	3–0	Rwanda	25–14	25–13	25–13			75–40	P2Report

==== 15th place match ====
Date	Time		Score		Set 1	Set 2	Set 3	Set 4	Set 5	Total	Report
18 July	13:00	Puerto Rico	0–3	Rwanda	0–25	0–25	0–25			0–75	Report

==== 13th place match ====
Date	Time		Score		Set 1	Set 2	Set 3	Set 4	Set 5	Total	Report
18 July	20:00	Thailand	0–3	Belgium	20–25	20–25	19–25			59–75	P2Report

=== Classification 9th–12th ===
9th–12th semifinals
17 July
Turkey	3
Egypt	1
17 July
Belarus	3
Argentina	0

9th place match
18 July
Turkey	1
Belarus	3
11th place match
18 July
Egypt	0
Argentina	3

==== 9th–12th semifinals ====
Date	Time		Score		Set 1	Set 2	Set 3	Set 4	Set 5	Total	Report
17 July	15:30	Turkey	3–1	Egypt	24–26	25–15	25–15	25–20		99–76	P2Report
17 July	18:30	Belarus	3–0	Argentina	25–15	25–17	25–15			75–47	P2Report

==== 11th place match ====
Date	Time		Score		Set 1	Set 2	Set 3	Set 4	Set 5	Total	Report
18 July	13:30	Egypt	0–3	Argentina	16–25	15–25	16–25			47–75	P2Report

==== 9th place match ====
Date	Time		Score		Set 1	Set 2	Set 3	Set 4	Set 5	Total	Report
18 July	16:30	Turkey	1–3	Belarus	25–20	17–25	13–25	21–25		76–95	P2Report

=== Classification 5th–8th ===
5th–8th semifinals
17 July
United States	3
Dominican Republic	0
17 July
Poland	3
Brazil	0

5th place match
18 July
United States	3
Poland	2
7th place match
18 July
Dominican Republic	0
Brazil	3

==== 5th–8th semifinals ====
Date	Time		Score		Set 1	Set 2	Set 3	Set 4	Set 5	Total	Report
17 July	15:30	United States	3–0	Dominican Republic	25–22	25–15	25–18			75–55	P2Report
17 July	17:30	Poland	3–0	Brazil	25–15	26–24	25–15			76–54	P2Report

==== 7th place match ====
Date	Time		Score		Set 1	Set 2	Set 3	Set 4	Set 5	Total	Report
18 July	15:00	Dominican Republic	0–3	Brazil	18–25	10–25	21–25			49–75	P2Report

==== 5th place match ====
Date	Time		Score		Set 1	Set 2	Set 3	Set 4	Set 5	Total	Report
18 July	17:30	United States	3–2	Poland	14–25	18–25	25–16	29–27	15–13	101–106	P2Report

=== Final four ===
Semifinals
17 July
Italy	3
Russia	0
17 July
Netherlands	1
Serbia	3

Final
18 July
Italy	3
Serbia	0
3rd place match
18 July
Russia	3
Netherlands	2

==== Semifinals ====
Date	Time		Score		Set 1	Set 2	Set 3	Set 4	Set 5	Total	Report
17 July	14:30	Italy	3–0	Russia	25–22	29–27	25–23			79–72	P2Report
17 July	17:30	Netherlands	1–3	Serbia	21–25	25–17	23–25	26–28		95–95	P2Report

==== 3rd place match ====
Date	Time		Score		Set 1	Set 2	Set 3	Set 4	Set 5	Total	Report
18 July	14:30	Russia	3–2	Netherlands	16–25	23–25	25–22	25–22	22–20	111–114	P2Report

==== Final ====
Date	Time		Score		Set 1	Set 2	Set 3	Set 4	Set 5	Total	Report
18 July	17:30	Italy	3–0	Serbia	25–18	25–20	25–23			75–61	P2Report

== Final standing ==
Rank	Team
1st place, gold medalist(s)	Italy
2nd place, silver medalist(s)	Serbia
3rd place, bronze medalist(s)	Russia
4	Netherlands
5	United States
6	Poland
7	Brazil
8	Dominican Republic
9	Belarus
10	Turkey
11	Argentina
12	Egypt
13	Belgium
14	Thailand
15	Rwanda
16	Puerto Rico

== Awards ==
- Most valuable player
  (Italy) Gaia Guiducci
- Best setter
  (Italy) Gaia Guiducci
- Best outside spikers
  (Italy) Loveth Omoruyi
  (Netherlands) Jolien Knollema
- Best middle blockers
  (Italy) Emma Graziani
  (Serbia) Hena Kurtagić
- Best opposite spiker
  (Russia) Vita Akimova
- Best libero
  (Italy) Martina Armini

== See also ==
- 2021 FIVB Volleyball Men's U21 World Championship
