= 2003 FIVB Volleyball Women's U20 World Championship =

2003 FIVB Women's U20 World Championship
Tournament details
- Host country: Thailand
- Dates: September 6–14, 2003
- Teams: 16
- Venue: 1 (in Suphanburi host cities)

Final positions
- Champions: Brazil (4th title)

The 2003 FIVB Women's U20 World Championship was held in Suphanburi, Thailand from September 6 to 14, 2003. 16 teams participated in the tournament.

== Qualification process ==
Confederation	Method of Qualification	Date	Venue	Vacancies	Qualified
FIVB	Host			1	Thailand
CSV	2002 South American Junior Championship	May 8 – 12, 2002	La Paz, Bolivia	2	Brazil; Venezuela
CEV	2002 European Junior Championship	May 22 – 25, 2002	Zagreb, Croatia	1	Poland
AVC	2002 Asian Junior Championship	September 1 – 8, 2002	Ho Chi Minh City, Vietnam	3	China; Chinese Taipei; South Korea
CAVB	2002 African Junior Championship	September 9 – 14, 2002	Sidi Bou Said, Tunisia	1	Algeria
NORCECA	2002 NORCECA Junior Championship	September 13 – 19, 2002	Humacao, Puerto Rico	2	Puerto Rico; Cuba
CEV	2003 Women's Junior European Volleyball Championship Qualification	May 22 – 25, 2003	Zagreb, Croatia	6	Ukraine
CEV	2003 Women's Junior European Volleyball Championship Qualification	May 22 – 25, 2003	Braila, Romania	6	Belarus
CEV	2003 Women's Junior European Volleyball Championship Qualification	May 22 – 25, 2003	Bardejov, Slovakia	6	Netherlands
CEV	2003 Women's Junior European Volleyball Championship Qualification	May 22 – 25, 2003	Istanbul, Turkey	6	Germany; Turkey*
CEV	2003 Women's Junior European Volleyball Championship Qualification	May 22 – 25, 2003	Montesilvano, Italy	6	Russia
Total				16	

- Turkey qualified as the best second place of the 2003 Women's Junior European Volleyball Championship Qualification's groups.

== Pools composition ==
Pool A	Pool B	Pool C	Pool D
Thailand; Netherlands; Venezuela; Algeria	Russia; South Korea; Puerto Rico; Belarus	China; Germany; Ukraine; Chinese Taipei	Cuba; Brazil; Poland; Turkey

== Preliminary round ==
=== Pool A ===
Pos	Team	Pld	W	L	Pts	SW	SL	SR	SPW	SPL	SPR	Qualification
1	Netherlands	3	3	0	6	9	0	MAX	226	147	1.537	Quarterfinals
2	Venezuela	3	2	1	5	6	6	1.000	252	263	0.958	Quarterfinals
3	Thailand	3	1	2	4	5	7	0.714	239	263	0.909	Quarterfinals
4	Algeria	3	0	3	3	2	9	0.222	216	260	0.831	Eliminated

Date		Score		Set 1	Set 2	Set 3	Set 4	Set 5	Total
6 Sep	Netherlands	3–0	Venezuela	25–21	25–22	25–9			75–52
6 Sep	Thailand	3–1	Algeria	25–13	25–21	16–25	25–22		91–81
7 Sep	Venezuela	3–1	Algeria	25–22	19–25	25–20	25–21		94–88
7 Sep	Netherlands	3–0	Thailand	25–11	26–24	25–13			76–48
8 Sep	Algeria	0–3	Netherlands	20–25	9–25	18–25			47–75
8 Sep	Thailand	2–3	Venezuela	25–22	25–19	17–25	22–25	11–15	100–106

=== Pool B ===
Pos	Team	Pld	W	L	Pts	SW	SL	SR	SPW	SPL	SPR	Qualification
1	Russia	3	2	1	5	8	4	2.000	275	245	1.122	Quarterfinals
2	South Korea	3	2	1	5	8	5	1.600	277	254	1.091	Quarterfinals
3	Belarus	3	2	1	5	7	6	1.167	268	266	1.008	Quarterfinals
4	Puerto Rico	3	0	3	3	1	9	0.111	171	246	0.695	Eliminated

Date		Score		Set 1	Set 2	Set 3	Set 4	Set 5	Total
6 Sep	Puerto Rico	0–3	South Korea	20–25	18–25	13–25			51–75
6 Sep	Belarus	1–3	Russia	18–25	27–25	22–25	22–25		89–100
7 Sep	Puerto Rico	1–3	Belarus	25–20	10–25	9–25	22–25		66–95
7 Sep	South Korea	3–2	Russia	23–25	25–14	25–21	13–25	16–14	102–99
8 Sep	Russia	3–0	Puerto Rico	25–15	26–24	25–15			76–54
8 Sep	Belarus	3–2	South Korea	15–25	25–20	24–26	25–20	15–9	104–100

=== Pool C ===
Pos	Team	Pld	W	L	Pts	SW	SL	SR	SPW	SPL	SPR	Qualification
1	Germany	3	3	0	6	9	2	4.500	263	219	1.201	Quarterfinals
2	China	3	2	1	5	6	3	2.000	215	183	1.175	Quarterfinals
3	Ukraine	3	1	2	4	5	7	0.714	237	267	0.888	Quarterfinals
4	Chinese Taipei	3	0	3	3	1	9	0.111	200	246	0.813	Eliminated

Date		Score		Set 1	Set 2	Set 3	Set 4	Set 5	Total
6 Sep	Ukraine	0–3	China	16–25	20–25	14–25			50–75
6 Sep	Germany	3–0	Chinese Taipei	25–17	25–21	26–24			76–62
7 Sep	Ukraine	2–3	Germany	20–25	25–23	25–21	14–25	8–15	92–108
7 Sep	China	3–0	Chinese Taipei	25–18	25–16	25–20			75–54
8 Sep	Germany	3–0	China	25–16	25–22	29–27			79–65
8 Sep	Chinese Taipei	1–3	Ukraine	21–25	22–25	25–20	16–25		84–95

=== Pool D ===
Pos	Team	Pld	W	L	Pts	SW	SL	SR	SPW	SPL	SPR	Qualification
1	Brazil	3	3	0	6	9	1	9.000	244	205	1.190	Quarterfinals
2	Poland	3	2	1	5	6	4	1.500	234	206	1.136	Quarterfinals
3	Turkey	3	1	2	4	2	7	0.286	242	241	1.004	Quarterfinals
4	Cuba	3	0	3	3	2	9	0.222	201	269	0.747	Eliminated

Date		Score		Set 1	Set 2	Set 3	Set 4	Set 5	Total
6 Sep	Poland	3–0	Turkey	25–14	25–22	25–20			75–56
6 Sep	Brazil	3–0	Cuba	25–19	25–21	25–14			75–54
7 Sep	Turkey	3–1	Cuba	25–13	23–25	25–12	25–23		98–72
7 Sep	Poland	0–3	Brazil	22–25	20–25	21–25			63–75
8 Sep	Brazil	3–1	Turkey	27–25	25–18	17–25	25–20		94–88
8 Sep	Cuba	1–3	Poland	17–25	11–25	25–21	22–25		75–96

== Second round ==
=== Play off – elimination group ===
Date		Score		Set 1	Set 2	Set 3	Set 4	Set 5	Total
Sep 10	Venezuela	0–3	Belarus	19–25	18–25	16–25			53–75
Sep 10	South Korea	1–3	Ukraine	26–24	18–25	23–25	18–25		85–99
Sep 10	China	3–0	Turkey	25–17	25–17	25–19			75–53
Sep 10	Poland	3–2	Thailand	25–18	24–26	25–18	25–27	15–7	114–96

=== Play off – seeding group ===
Date		Score		Set 1	Set 2	Set 3	Set 4	Set 5	Total
Sep 10	Germany	2–3	Netherlands	23–25	25–22	18–25	25–20	12–15	103–107
Sep 10	Brazil	3–2	Russia	25–19	22–25	31–33	27–25	17–15	122–117

== Final round ==
Quarterfinals
September 12 – Suphanburi
Brazil	3
Belarus	1
September 12 – Suphanburi
Poland	3
Germany	1
September 12 – Suphanburi
Netherlands	3
Ukraine	2
September 12 – Suphanburi
China	3
Russia	2

Semifinals
September 13 – Suphanburi
Brazil	3
Poland	1
September 13 – Suphanburi
Netherlands	2
China	3

Final
September 14 – Suphanburi
Brazil	3
China	2
3rd place
September 14 – Suphanburi
Poland	3
Netherlands	0

5th–8th places
September 13 – Suphanburi
Belarus	1
Germany	3
September 13 – Suphanburi
Ukraine	3
Russia	2

5th place
September 14 – Suphanburi
Germany	3
Ukraine	1
7th place
September 14 – Suphanburi
Belarus	3
Russia	2

=== Quarterfinals ===
Date		Score		Set 1	Set 2	Set 3	Set 4	Set 5	Total
Sep 12	Poland	3–1	Germany	25–22	25–18	21–25	25–17		92–86
Sep 12	Russia	2–3	China	19–25	25–17	25–19	20–25	9–15	98–101
Sep 12	Brazil	3–1	Belarus	25–17	25–16	26–28	25–22		101–83
Sep 12	Ukraine	2–3	Netherlands	20–25	25–20	22–25	25–17	11–15	103–102

=== 5th–8th semifinals ===
Date		Score		Set 1	Set 2	Set 3	Set 4	Set 5	Total
Sep 13	Germany	3–1	Belarus	25–21	25–20	23–25	25–21		98–87
Sep 13	Russia	2–3	Ukraine	25–21	19–25	25–18	15–25	26–28	110–117

=== Semifinals ===
Date		Score		Set 1	Set 2	Set 3	Set 4	Set 5	Total
Sep 13	Poland	1–3	Brazil	23–25	20–25	25–16	17–25		85–91
Sep 13	China	3–2	Netherlands	25–17	25–20	28–30	20–25	15–4	113–96

=== 7th place ===
Date		Score		Set 1	Set 2	Set 3	Set 4	Set 5	Total
Sep 14	Belarus	3–2	Russia	26–24	25–18	18–25	18–25	15–8	102–100

=== 5th place ===
Date		Score		Set 1	Set 2	Set 3	Set 4	Set 5	Total
Sep 14	Germany	3–1	Ukraine	17–25	25–20	25–18	25–24		92–86

=== 3rd place ===
Date		Score		Set 1	Set 2	Set 3	Set 4	Set 5	Total
Sep 14	Poland	3–0	Netherlands	28–26	25–23	25–14			78–63

=== Final ===
Date		Score		Set 1	Set 2	Set 3	Set 4	Set 5	Total
Sep 14	Brazil	3–2	China	22–25	25–22	25–17	21–25	15–10	108–99

== Final standing ==
Rank	Team
1st place, gold medalist(s)	Brazil
2nd place, silver medalist(s)	China
3rd place, bronze medalist(s)	Poland
4	Netherlands
5	Germany
6	Ukraine
7	Belarus
8	Russia
9	Thailand
9	Venezuela
9	South Korea
9	Turkey
13	Algeria
13	Puerto Rico
13	Chinese Taipei
13	Cuba

2003 FIVB Women's Junior World champions

Brazil
4th title

12–woman Roster
Fernanda Gritzbach, Danielle Lins, Camila Adao, Thaisa Menezes, Fabiana Claudino, Fernanda Alves, Mari Mendes, Alessandra Sperb, Dayse Figueiredo, Joyce Silva, Joyce Victalino, Elymara Silva
Head coach
Wadson Lima

== Individual awards ==
- Best scorer: (Netherlands) Manon Flier
- Best spiker: (Brazil) Fabiana Claudino
- Best blocker: (Germany) Christiane Furst
- Best server: (Netherlands) Manon Flier
- Best setter: (China) Guan Jingjing
- Best receiver: (Poland) Agata Sawicka
- Best digger: (Poland) Agata Sawicka
