= Poland women's national under-21 volleyball team =

Poland U20
- Association: Polish Volleyball Federation
- Confederation: CEV

Uniforms
Home	Away	Third

FIVB U21 World Championship
- Appearances: 10 (First in 1991)
- Best result: (bronze) Third Place : (2003)

Europe U20 / U19 Championship
- Appearances: 23 (First in 1966)
- Best result: (gold) Champions : (2002)
- pzps.pl (in Polish)

The Poland women's national under-20 volleyball team represents Poland in international women's volleyball competitions and friendly matches under the age 20 and it is ruled by the Polish Volleyball Federation That is an affiliate of Federation of International Volleyball FIVB and also a part of European Volleyball Confederation CEV.

== Results ==
=== FIVB U20 World Championship ===
Champions Runners up Third place Fourth place

FIVB U20 World Championship
Year	Round	Position	Pld	W	L	SW	SL	Squad
(Brazil) 1977	Didn't Qualify							
(Mexico) 1981	Didn't Qualify							
(Italy) 1985	Didn't Qualify							
(South Korea) 1987	Didn't Qualify							
(Peru) 1989	Didn't Qualify							
(Czechoslovakia) 1991		13th place						Squad
(Brazil) 1993	Didn't Qualify							
(Thailand) 1995		9th place						Squad
(Poland) 1997		5th place						Squad
(Canada) 1999		5th place						Squad
(Dominican Republic) 2001		13th place						Squad
(Thailand) 2003		Third Place						
(Turkey) 2005	Didn't Qualify							
(Thailand) 2007	Didn't Qualify							
(Mexico) 2009		13th place						
(Peru) 2011		9th place						Squad
(Czech Republic) 2013	Didn't Qualify							
(Puerto Rico) 2015	Didn't Qualify							
(Mexico) 2017		6th place						Squad
(Mexico) 2019		5th place						Squad
(Belgium) (Netherlands) 2021		6th place						Squad
Total	0 Titles	10/21						

=== Europe U19 Championship ===
Champions Runners up Third place Fourth place

Europe U19 Championship
Year	Round	Position	Pld	W	L	SW	SL	Squad
(Hungary) 1966		5th place						
(Soviet Union) 1969		Third place						Squad
(Italy) 1971		Third place						Squad
(Netherlands) 1973		4th place						Squad
(West Germany) 1975		6th place						Squad
(Socialist Federal Republic of Yugoslavia) 1977		4th place						Squad
(Spain) 1979		5th place						Squad
(West Germany) 1982	Didn't Qualify							
(France) 1984	Didn't Qualify							
(Bulgaria) 1986		6th place						Squad
(Italy) 1988		6th place						Squad
(Austria) 1990		8th place						Squad
(Greece) 1992	Didn't Qualify							
(Hungary) 1994		7th place						Squad
(Turkey) 1996		Third place						Squad
(Belgium) 1998		5th place						Squad

Europe U19 Championship
Year	Round	Position	Pld	W	L	SW	SL	Squad
(Switzerland) 2000		Third place						Squad
(Croatia) 2002		Champions						Squad
(Slovakia) 2004		11th place						Squad
(France) 2006		12th place						Squad
(Italy) 2008		6th place						Squad
(Serbia) 2010		10th place						Squad
(Turkey) 2012		6th place						Squad
(Finland) / (Estonia) 2014	Didn't Qualify							
(Hungary) / (Slovakia) 2016	Didn't Qualify							
(Albania) 2018		Third place						Squad
(Bosnia and Herzegovina) / (Croatia) 2020		5th place						Squad
(North Macedonia) 2022		Third place						Squad
Total	1 title	23/28						

== Team ==
=== Current squad ===
The following is the Polish roster for the 2019 FIVB Volleyball Women's U20 World Championship.

Head coach: Waldemar Kawka

No.	Name	Pos.	Date of birth	Height	Weight	Spike	2019 club
2	Monika Jagła	4 January 2000	1.77 m (5 ft 10 in)	69 kg (152 lb)	298 cm (117 in)	285 cm (112 in)	(Poland) KS Pałac Bydgoszcz
5	Weronika Centka	6 September 2000	1.91 m (6 ft 3 in)	63 kg (139 lb)	312 cm (123 in)	297 cm (117 in)	(Poland) Grot Budowlani Łódź
8	Zuzanna Gorecka	10 April 2000	1.81 m (5 ft 11 in)	63 kg (139 lb)	301 cm (119 in)	284 cm (112 in)	(Poland) LTS Legionovia Legionowo
9	Paulina Damaske	1 June 2001	1.78 m (5 ft 10 in)	64 kg (141 lb)	304 cm (120 in)	292 cm (115 in)	(Poland) SPS Volley Piła
10	Adrianna Rybak	29 September 2000	1.88 m (6 ft 2 in)	72 kg (159 lb)	300 cm (120 in)	287 cm (113 in)	(Poland) GEDANIA S.A. Gdańsk
12	Oliwia Baluk (c)	17 May 2000	1.75 m (5 ft 9 in)	62 kg (137 lb)	288 cm (113 in)	279 cm (110 in)	(Poland) PSPS Chemik Police
13	Klaudia Laskowska	23 January 2000	1.88 m (6 ft 2 in)	77 kg (170 lb)	303 cm (119 in)	291 cm (115 in)	(Poland) KS Palac Bydgoszcz
14	Paulina Zaborowska	7 June 2000	1.79 m (5 ft 10 in)	66 kg (146 lb)	290 cm (110 in)	271 cm (107 in)	(Poland) LTS Legionovia Legionowo
16	Julia Mazur	17 April 2001	1.69 m (5 ft 7 in)	62 kg (137 lb)	286 cm (113 in)	270 cm (110 in)	(Poland) SPS Volley Piła
19	Julia Orzoł	11 October 2002	1.86 m (6 ft 1 in)	74 kg (163 lb)	310 cm (120 in)	297 cm (117 in)	(Poland) LTS Legionovia Legionowo
20	Zofia Szczotkiewicz	10 July 2001	1.84 m (6 ft 0 in)	61 kg (134 lb)	300 cm (120 in)	290 cm (110 in)	(Poland) SPS Volley Piła
22	Weronika Szlagowska	29 November 2001	1.88 m (6 ft 2 in)	70 kg (150 lb)	306 cm (120 in)	290 cm (110 in)	(Poland) APS Rumia

== See also ==
- Poland women's team
- Poland women's U18 team
- Poland women's U20 team
- Poland women's U23 team
- Poland men's team
