= 1981 FIVB Volleyball Women's U20 World Championship =

1981 FIVB Women's U20 World Championship
Tournament details
- Host country: Mexico
- Dates: October 16–26, 1981
- Teams: 15
- Venue: 1 (in Mexico City host cities)

Final positions
- Champions: South Korea (2nd title)

The 1981 FIVB Women's U20 World Championship was held in Mexico City, Mexico from October 16 to 26, 1981. 15 teams participated in the tournament.

== Qualification ==
A total of 15 teams qualified for the final tournament. In addition to Mexico, who qualified automatically as the hosts, another 14 teams qualified via four separate continental tournament.

| Means of qualification | Vacancies | Qualified |
|---|---|---|
| Host country | 1 | Mexico |
| 1980 Asian Junior Championship | 4 | South Korea |
| 1980 Asian Junior Championship | 4 | Japan |
| 1980 Asian Junior Championship | 4 | India |
| 1980 Asian Junior Championship | 4 | Australia * |
| 1980 NORCECA Junior Championship | 2 | Cuba |
| 1980 NORCECA Junior Championship | 2 | Canada |
| 1979 European Junior Championship | 2 | Soviet Union |
| 1979 European Junior Championship | 2 | Spain ** |
| 1980 South American Championship | 3 | Peru |
| 1980 South American Championship | 3 | Brazil |
| 1980 South American Championship | 3 | Argentina |
| Wild card | 3 | China *** |
| Wild card | 3 | Puerto Rico |
| Wild card | 3 | Costa Rica |
| Wild card | 3 | ~~Bolivia~~ **** |
| Total | 15 | |

- * Australia replaced Singapore.
- ** Spain replaced East Germany.
- *** China didn't participate in Asian Championship because they did not maintain any relations with South Korea. Officially they were in War.
- **** Bolivia declined to participate.

== Pools composition ==
=== First round ===
| Pool A | Pool B | Pool C | Pool D |
|---|---|---|---|
| Mexico; Argentina; Australia; India | Canada; Cuba; South Korea; Spain | Brazil; Costa Rica; Japan; ~~Bolivia~~ * | China; Peru; Puerto Rico; Soviet Union |

- Bolivia declined to participate.

=== Second round ===
| Pool A1 | Pool A2 | Pool B1 | Pool B2 |
|---|---|---|---|
| Argentina; Brazil; Japan; Mexico | China; Cuba; Peru; South Korea | Australia; Costa Rica; India | Canada; Puerto Rico; Soviet Union; Spain |

== Preliminary round ==
=== Pool A ===
| Pos | Team | Pld | W | L | Pts | SW | SL | SR | SPW | SPL | SPR | Qualification |
|---|---|---|---|---|---|---|---|---|---|---|---|---|
| 1 | Mexico | 3 | 3 | 0 | 6 | 9 | 0 | MAX | 135 | 39 | 3.462 | Pool A1 or A2 |
| 2 | Argentina | 3 | 2 | 1 | 5 | 6 | 4 | 1.500 | 127 | 83 | 1.530 | Pool A1 or A2 |
| 3 | Australia | 3 | 1 | 2 | 4 | 3 | 6 | 0.500 | 63 | 120 | 0.525 | Pool B1 or B2 |
| 4 | India | 3 | 0 | 3 | 3 | 1 | 9 | 0.111 | 66 | 149 | 0.443 | Pool B1 or B2 |

| Date | | Score | | Set 1 | Set 2 | Set 3 | Set 4 | Set 5 | Total |
|---|---|---|---|---|---|---|---|---|---|
| 16 Oct | Mexico | 3–0 | Argentina | 15–10 | 15–7 | 15–7 | | | 45–24 |
| 16 Oct | Australia | 3–0 | India | 15–9 | 16–14 | 15–7 | | | 46–30 |
| 17 Oct | Argentina | 3–1 | India | 13–15 | 15–6 | 15–3 | 15–3 | | 58–27 |
| 17 Oct | Mexico | 3–0 | Australia | 15–0 | 15–3 | 15–3 | | | 45–6 |
| 18 Oct | Argentina | 3–0 | Australia | 15–6 | 15–2 | 15–3 | | | 45–11 |
| 18 Oct | Mexico | 3–0 | India | 15–3 | 15–2 | 15–4 | | | 45–9 |

=== Pool B ===
| Pos | Team | Pld | W | L | Pts | SW | SL | SR | SPW | SPL | SPR | Qualification |
|---|---|---|---|---|---|---|---|---|---|---|---|---|
| 1 | South Korea | 3 | 3 | 0 | 6 | 9 | 0 | MAX | 135 | 31 | 4.355 | Pool A1 or A2 |
| 2 | Cuba | 3 | 2 | 1 | 5 | 6 | 3 | 2.000 | 105 | 93 | 1.129 | Pool A1 or A2 |
| 3 | Canada | 3 | 1 | 2 | 4 | 3 | 6 | 0.500 | 89 | 114 | 0.781 | Pool B1 or B2 |
| 4 | Spain | 3 | 0 | 3 | 3 | 0 | 9 | 0.000 | 44 | 134 | 0.328 | Pool B1 or B2 |

| Date | | Score | | Set 1 | Set 2 | Set 3 | Set 4 | Set 5 | Total |
|---|---|---|---|---|---|---|---|---|---|
| 16 Oct | South Korea | 3–0 | Spain | 15–2 | 15–4 | 15–1 | | | 45–7 |
| 16 Oct | Cuba | 3–0 | Canada | 15–7 | 15–13 | 16–14 | | | 46–34 |
| 17 Oct | Canada | 3–0 | Spain | 15–6 | 15–5 | 15–12 | | | 45–23 |
| 17 Oct | South Korea | 3–0 | Cuba | 15–2 | 15–7 | 15–5 | | | 45–14 |
| 18 Oct | South Korea | 3–0 | Canada | 15–3 | 15–6 | 15–1 | | | 45–10 |
| 18 Oct | Cuba | 3–0 | Spain | 15–5 | 15–4 | 15–5 | | | 45–14 |

=== Pool C ===
| Pos | Team | Pld | W | L | Pts | SW | SL | SR | SPW | SPL | SPR | Qualification |
|---|---|---|---|---|---|---|---|---|---|---|---|---|
| 1 | Japan | 2 | 2 | 0 | 4 | 6 | 1 | 6.000 | 97 | 38 | 2.553 | Pool A1 or A2 |
| 2 | Brazil | 2 | 1 | 1 | 3 | 4 | 3 | 1.333 | 83 | 53 | 1.566 | Pool A1 or A2 |
| 3 | Costa Rica | 2 | 0 | 2 | 2 | 0 | 6 | 0.000 | 1 | 90 | 0.011 | Pool B1 or B2 |

| Date | | Score | | Set 1 | Set 2 | Set 3 | Set 4 | Set 5 | Total |
|---|---|---|---|---|---|---|---|---|---|
| 16 Oct | Brazil | 3–0 | Costa Rica | 15–1 | 15–0 | 15–0 | | | 45–1 |
| 17 Oct | Japan | 3–0 | Costa Rica | 15–0 | 15–0 | 15–0 | | | 45–0 |
| 18 Oct | Japan | 3–1 | Brazil | 15–10 | 15–7 | 7–15 | 15–6 | | 52–38 |

=== Pool D ===
| Pos | Team | Pld | W | L | Pts | SW | SL | SR | SPW | SPL | SPR | Qualification |
|---|---|---|---|---|---|---|---|---|---|---|---|---|
| 1 | Peru | 3 | 3 | 0 | 6 | 9 | 2 | 4.500 | 148 | 67 | 2.209 | Pool A1 or A2 |
| 2 | China | 3 | 2 | 1 | 5 | 7 | 5 | 1.400 | 145 | 122 | 1.189 | Pool A1 or A2 |
| 3 | Soviet Union | 3 | 1 | 2 | 4 | 6 | 6 | 1.000 | 130 | 118 | 1.102 | Pool B1 or B2 |
| 4 | Puerto Rico | 3 | 0 | 3 | 3 | 0 | 9 | 0.000 | 19 | 135 | 0.141 | Pool B1 or B2 |

| Date | | Score | | Set 1 | Set 2 | Set 3 | Set 4 | Set 5 | Total |
|---|---|---|---|---|---|---|---|---|---|
| 16 Oct | Soviet Union | 3–0 | Puerto Rico | 15–3 | 15–3 | 15–0 | | | 45–6 |
| 16 Oct | Peru | 3–1 | China | 15–8 | 15–5 | 11–15 | 15–7 | | 56–35 |
| 17 Oct | Peru | 3–0 | Puerto Rico | 15–0 | 15–1 | 15–3 | | | 45–4 |
| 17 Oct | China | 3–2 | Soviet Union | 11–15 | 15–8 | 9–15 | 15–11 | 15–8 | 65–57 |
| 18 Oct | China | 3–0 | Puerto Rico | 15–1 | 15–8 | 15–0 | | | 45–9 |
| 18 Oct | Peru | 3–0 | Soviet Union | 15–5 | 15–8 | 17–15 | | | 47–28 |

== Second round ==
=== Pool A1 (1st–8th) ===
| Pos | Team | Pld | W | L | Pts | SW | SL | SR | SPW | SPL | SPR | Qualification |
|---|---|---|---|---|---|---|---|---|---|---|---|---|
| 1 | Japan | 3 | 3 | 0 | 6 | 9 | 1 | 9.000 | 142 | 70 | 2.029 | Semifinals |
| 2 | Mexico | 3 | 2 | 1 | 5 | 6 | 5 | 1.200 | 134 | 127 | 1.055 | Semifinals |
| 3 | Brazil | 3 | 1 | 2 | 4 | 6 | 6 | 1.000 | 141 | 147 | 0.959 | 5th place playoff |
| 4 | Argentina | 3 | 0 | 3 | 3 | 0 | 9 | 0.000 | 62 | 135 | 0.459 | 5th place playoff |

| Date | | Score | | Set 1 | Set 2 | Set 3 | Set 4 | Set 5 | Total |
|---|---|---|---|---|---|---|---|---|---|
| 20 Oct | Mexico | 3–2 | Brazil | 10–15 | 15–12 | 15–8 | 12–15 | 15–8 | 67–58 |
| 20 Oct | Japan | 3–0 | Argentina | 15–4 | 15–4 | 15–2 | | | 45–10 |
| 21 Oct | Japan | 3–0 | Mexico | 15–9 | 15–9 | 15–4 | | | 45–22 |
| 21 Oct | Brazil | 3–0 | Argentina | 15–12 | 15–11 | 15–5 | | | 45–28 |

=== Pool A2 (1st–8th) ===
| Pos | Team | Pld | W | L | Pts | SW | SL | SR | SPW | SPL | SPR | Qualification |
|---|---|---|---|---|---|---|---|---|---|---|---|---|
| 1 | South Korea | 3 | 3 | 0 | 6 | 9 | 3 | 3.000 | 161 | 121 | 1.331 | Semifinals |
| 2 | Peru | 3 | 2 | 1 | 5 | 7 | 5 | 1.400 | 162 | 120 | 1.350 | Semifinals |
| 3 | China | 3 | 1 | 2 | 4 | 6 | 6 | 1.000 | 139 | 135 | 1.030 | 5th place playoff |
| 4 | Cuba | 3 | 0 | 3 | 3 | 1 | 9 | 0.111 | 62 | 148 | 0.419 | 5th place playoff |

| Date | | Score | | Set 1 | Set 2 | Set 3 | Set 4 | Set 5 | Total |
|---|---|---|---|---|---|---|---|---|---|
| 20 Oct | Peru | 3–1 | Cuba | 15–8 | 15–4 | 13–15 | 15–5 | | 58–32 |
| 20 Oct | South Korea | 3–2 | China | 9–15 | 15–12 | 9–15 | 15–8 | 15–9 | 63–59 |
| 21 Oct | South Korea | 3–1 | Peru | 15–12 | 8–15 | 15–8 | 15–13 | | 53–48 |
| 21 Oct | China | 3–0 | Cuba | 15–3 | 15–11 | 15–2 | | | 45–16 |

=== Pool B1 (9th–16th) ===
| Pos | Team | Pld | W | L | Pts | SW | SL | SR | SPW | SPL | SPR | Qualification |
|---|---|---|---|---|---|---|---|---|---|---|---|---|
| 1 | Australia | 2 | 2 | 0 | 4 | 6 | 0 | MAX | 91 | 54 | 1.685 | 9th place playoff |
| 2 | India | 2 | 1 | 1 | 3 | 3 | 3 | 1.000 | 75 | 57 | 1.316 | 9th place playoff |
| 3 | Costa Rica | 2 | 0 | 2 | 2 | 0 | 6 | 0.000 | 35 | 90 | 0.389 | 13th place playoff |

| Date | | Score | | Set 1 | Set 2 | Set 3 | Set 4 | Set 5 | Total |
|---|---|---|---|---|---|---|---|---|---|
| 20 Oct | India | 3–0 | Costa Rica | 15–4 | 15–4 | 15–3 | | | 45–11 |
| 21 Oct | Australia | 3–0 | Costa Rica | 15–7 | 15–5 | 15–12 | | | 45–24 |

=== Pool B2 (9th–16th) ===
| Pos | Team | Pld | W | L | Pts | SW | SL | SR | SPW | SPL | SPR | Qualification |
|---|---|---|---|---|---|---|---|---|---|---|---|---|
| 1 | Soviet Union | 3 | 3 | 0 | 6 | 9 | 0 | MAX | 135 | 36 | 3.750 | 9th place playoff |
| 2 | Canada | 3 | 2 | 1 | 5 | 6 | 3 | 2.000 | 114 | 90 | 1.267 | 9th place playoff |
| 3 | Puerto Rico | 3 | 1 | 2 | 4 | 3 | 8 | 0.375 | 101 | 155 | 0.652 | 13th place playoff |
| 4 | Spain | 3 | 0 | 3 | 3 | 2 | 9 | 0.222 | 94 | 163 | 0.577 | 13th place playoff |

| Date | | Score | | Set 1 | Set 2 | Set 3 | Set 4 | Set 5 | Total |
|---|---|---|---|---|---|---|---|---|---|
| 20 Oct | Canada | 3–0 | Puerto Rico | 15–7 | 15–8 | 15–7 | | | 45–22 |
| 20 Oct | Soviet Union | 3–0 | Spain | 15–3 | 15–3 | 15–10 | | | 45–6 |
| 21 Oct | Soviet Union | 3–0 | Canada | 15–13 | 15–10 | 15–1 | | | 45–24 |
| 21 Oct | Puerto Rico | 3–2 | Spain | 17–15 | 13–15 | 15–11 | 13–15 | 15–9 | 73–65 |

== Final round ==
=== 13th–15th places ===
13th–15th places
Spain | 3
Costa Rica | 0
Puerto Rico
Bye

13th place
Spain | 3
Puerto Rico | 0

=== Classification 13th and 15th ===
| Date | | Score | | Set 1 | Set 2 | Set 3 | Set 4 | Set 5 | Total |
|---|---|---|---|---|---|---|---|---|---|
| 24 Oct | Spain | 3–0 | Costa Rica | 15–3 | 15–9 | 15–12 | | | 45–24 |

=== Classification 13th ===
| Date | | Score | | Set 1 | Set 2 | Set 3 | Set 4 | Set 5 | Total |
|---|---|---|---|---|---|---|---|---|---|
| 25 Oct | Spain | 3–0 | Puerto Rico | 15–10 | 15–13 | 16–14 | | | 46–37 |

=== 9th–12th places ===
9th–12th places
Soviet Union | 3
India | 0
Canada | 3
Australia | 0

9th place
Soviet Union | 3
Canada | 0
11th place
India | 3
Australia | 1

=== Classification 9th and 12th ===
| Date | | Score | | Set 1 | Set 2 | Set 3 | Set 4 | Set 5 | Total |
|---|---|---|---|---|---|---|---|---|---|
| 24 Oct | Soviet Union | 3–0 | India | 15–6 | 15–7 | 15–2 | | | 45–15 |
| 24 Oct | Canada | 3–0 | Australia | 15–4 | 15–4 | 15–5 | | | 45–13 |

=== Classification 11th ===
| Date | | Score | | Set 1 | Set 2 | Set 3 | Set 4 | Set 5 | Total |
|---|---|---|---|---|---|---|---|---|---|
| 25 Oct | India | 3–1 | Australia | 15–12 | 11–15 | 15–13 | 15–5 | | 56–45 |

=== Classification 9th ===
| Date | | Score | | Set 1 | Set 2 | Set 3 | Set 4 | Set 5 | Total |
|---|---|---|---|---|---|---|---|---|---|
| 25 Oct | Soviet Union | 3–0 | Canada | 15–3 | 15–10 | 15–9 | | | 45–22 |

=== 5th–8th places ===
5th–8th places
China | 3
Argentina | 0
Brazil | 3
Cuba | 0

5th place
China | 3
Brazil | 0
7th place
Argentina | 1
Cuba | 3

=== Classification 5th and 8th ===
| Date | | Score | | Set 1 | Set 2 | Set 3 | Set 4 | Set 5 | Total |
|---|---|---|---|---|---|---|---|---|---|
| 25 Oct | China | 3–0 | Argentina | 15–9 | 15–3 | 15–5 | | | 45–17 |
| 25 Oct | Brazil | 3–2 | Cuba | 15–11 | 6–15 | 12–15 | 15–9 | 15–9 | 63–59 |

=== Classification 7th ===
| Date | | Score | | Set 1 | Set 2 | Set 3 | Set 4 | Set 5 | Total |
|---|---|---|---|---|---|---|---|---|---|
| 26 Oct | Cuba | 3–1 | Argentina | 15–3 | 15–7 | 8–15 | 15–7 | | 63–32 |

=== Classification 5th ===
| Date | | Score | | Set 1 | Set 2 | Set 3 | Set 4 | Set 5 | Total |
|---|---|---|---|---|---|---|---|---|---|
| 26 Oct | China | 3–0 | Brazil | 15–8 | 15–13 | 15–4 | | | 45–25 |

=== Championship round ===
Semifinals
South Korea | 3
Mexico | 0
Peru | 3
Japan | 0

Final
South Korea | 3
Peru | 1
Third place
Mexico | 0
Japan | 3

=== Semifinals ===
| Date | | Score | | Set 1 | Set 2 | Set 3 | Set 4 | Set 5 | Total |
|---|---|---|---|---|---|---|---|---|---|
| 25 Oct | Peru | 3–0 | Japan | 15–12 | 17–15 | 15–11 | | | 47–38 |
| 25 Oct | South Korea | 3–0 | Mexico | 15–2 | 15–3 | 15–2 | | | 45–7 |

=== Bronze medal match ===
| Date | | Score | | Set 1 | Set 2 | Set 3 | Set 4 | Set 5 | Total |
|---|---|---|---|---|---|---|---|---|---|
| 26 Oct | Japan | 3–0 | Mexico | 16–14 | 15–11 | 15–13 | | | 46–38 |

=== Gold medal match ===
| Date | | Score | | Set 1 | Set 2 | Set 3 | Set 4 | Set 5 | Total |
|---|---|---|---|---|---|---|---|---|---|
| 26 Oct | South Korea | 3–1 | Peru | 6–15 | 15–11 | 15–13 | 15–8 | | 51–47 |

== Final standing ==
| Rank | Team |
|---|---|
| 1st place, gold medalist(s) | South Korea |
| 2nd place, silver medalist(s) | Peru |
| 3rd place, bronze medalist(s) | Japan |
| 4 | Mexico |
| 5 | China |
| 6 | Brazil |
| 7 | Cuba |
| 8 | Argentina |
| 9 | Soviet Union |
| 10 | Canada |
| 11 | India |
| 12 | Australia |
| 13 | Spain |
| 14 | Puerto Rico |
| 15 | Costa Rica |

1981 FIVB Women's Junior World champions

South Korea
2nd title
