= 2022 Women's U19 Volleyball European Championship Qualification =

This article describes the qualification for the 2022 Women's U19 Volleyball European Championship.

== Pools composition ==
The second round organisers were drawn and then the pools were set accordingly, following the serpentine system according to their European Ranking for national teams as of December 2020. Rankings are shown in brackets. The CEV later excluded Belarus and Russia from participation in all competitions at the start of March 2022.

=== Second round ===
Pool A	Pool B	Pool C	Pool D	Pool E
Italy (8)	Croatia (11)	Romania (13)	Slovenia (13)	Greece (15)
Germany (10)	~~Russia (9)~~; Sweden (32)	Slovakia (7)	Bulgaria (5)	France (5)
Netherlands (11)	Norway (15)	Denmark (19)	Finland (19)	Latvia (19)
			~~Sweden (32)~~	Israel (31)

Pool F	Pool G	Pool H	Pool I
Bosnia and Herzegovina (17)	Albania (18)	Czech Republic (19)	Kosovo (35)
~~Belarus (4)~~	Poland (3)	Serbia (2)	Turkey (1)
Switzerland (19)	Austria (24)	Belgium (24)	Estonia (24)
Montenegro (30)	Ukraine (24)	Spain (24)	Hungary (24)

=== Third round ===
Pool J	Pool K
Estonia (24)	Montenegro (30)
Slovakia (7)	France (5)
Netherlands (11)	Finland (19)
Spain (24)	Austria (24)

== Second round ==
=== Pool A ===
Pos	Team	Pld	W	L	Pts	SW	SL	SR	SPW	SPL	SPR	Qualification
1	Italy	2	2	0	6	6	1	6.000	173	125	1.384	2022 European Championship
2	Netherlands	2	1	1	3	4	3	1.333	149	161	0.925	
3	Germany	2	0	2	0	0	6	0.000	114	150	0.760	

Date	Time		Score		Set 1	Set 2	Set 3	Set 4	Set 5	Total	Report
8 Apr	19:00	Germany	0–3	Italy	15–25	17–25	19–25			51–75	Report
9 Apr	19:00	Netherlands	3–0	Germany	25–22	25–20	25–21			75–63	Report
10 Apr	19:00	Italy	3–1	Netherlands	25–19	25–20	23–25	25–10		98–74	Report

=== Pool B ===
Pos	Team	Pld	W	L	Pts	SW	SL	SR	SPW	SPL	SPR	Qualification
1	Croatia	2	2	0	6	6	1	6.000	165	102	1.618	2022 European Championship
2	Sweden	2	1	1	2	4	5	0.800	168	184	0.913	
3	Norway	2	0	2	1	2	6	0.333	131	178	0.736	

Date	Time		Score		Set 1	Set 2	Set 3	Set 4	Set 5	Total	Report
8 Apr	20:00	Norway	2–3	Sweden	19–25	25–16	25–22	17–25	8–15	94–103	Report
9 Apr	20:00	Croatia	3–0	Norway	25–13	25–11	25–13			75–37	Report
10 Apr	20:00	Sweden	1–3	Croatia	14–25	25–15	10–25	16–25		65–90	Report

=== Pool C ===
Pos	Team	Pld	W	L	Pts	SW	SL	SR	SPW	SPL	SPR	Qualification
1	Romania	2	2	0	6	6	1	6.000	171	132	1.295	2022 European Championship
2	Slovakia	2	1	1	3	4	3	1.333	160	139	1.151	
3	Denmark	2	0	2	0	0	6	0.000	90	150	0.600	

Date	Time		Score		Set 1	Set 2	Set 3	Set 4	Set 5	Total	Report
8 Apr	18:00	Romania	3–1	Slovakia	20–25	26–24	25–18	25–18		96–85	Report
9 Apr	18:00	Denmark	0–3	Romania	19–25	11–25	17–25			47–75	Report
10 Apr	18:00	Slovakia	3–0	Denmark	25–15	25–14	25–14			75–43	Report

=== Pool D ===
Pos	Team	Pld	W	L	Pts	SW	SL	SR	SPW	SPL	SPR	Qualification
1	Slovenia	2	2	0	6	6	1	6.000	170	120	1.417	2022 European Championship
2	Finland	2	1	1	3	4	4	1.000	164	186	0.882	
3	Bulgaria	2	0	2	0	1	6	0.167	146	174	0.839	

Date	Time		Score		Set 1	Set 2	Set 3	Set 4	Set 5	Total	Report
8 Apr	17:00	Finland	1–3	Slovenia	25–20	15–25	17–25	8–25		65–95	Report
9 Apr	15:00	Bulgaria	1–3	Finland	25–22	19–25	25–27	22–25		91–99	Report
10 Apr	17:00	Slovenia	3–0	Bulgaria	25–21	25–14	25–20			75–55	Report

=== Pool E ===
Pos	Team	Pld	W	L	Pts	SW	SL	SR	SPW	SPL	SPR	Qualification
1	Greece	3	3	0	9	9	0	MAX	228	156	1.462	2022 European Championship
2	France	3	2	1	6	6	4	1.500	233	208	1.120	
3	Latvia	3	1	2	3	4	7	0.571	227	258	0.880	
4	Israel	3	0	3	0	1	9	0.111	179	245	0.731	

Date	Time		Score		Set 1	Set 2	Set 3	Set 4	Set 5	Total	Report
8 Apr	16:00	Israel	0–3	France	16–25	18–25	15–25			49–75	Report
8 Apr	19:15	Greece	3–0	Latvia	25–12	25–17	25–22			75–51	Report
9 Apr	16:00	France	3–1	Latvia	31–33	25–20	25–11	25–17		106–81	Report
9 Apr	19:15	Israel	0–3	Greece	14–25	20–25	19–25			53–75	Report
10 Apr	16:00	Latvia	3–1	Israel	25–22	20–25	25–18	25–12		95–77	Report
10 Apr	19:15	France	0–3	Greece	26–28	13–25	13–25			52–78	Report

=== Pool F ===
Pos	Team	Pld	W	L	Pts	SW	SL	SR	SPW	SPL	SPR	Qualification
1	Switzerland	2	2	0	5	6	2	3.000	185	167	1.108	2022 European Championship
2	Montenegro	2	1	1	3	5	5	1.000	207	213	0.972	
3	Bosnia and Herzegovina	2	0	2	1	2	6	0.333	176	188	0.936	

Date	Time		Score		Set 1	Set 2	Set 3	Set 4	Set 5	Total	Report
7 Apr	17:30	Montenegro	2–3	Switzerland	23–25	25–23	25–19	15–25	9–15	97–107	Report
8 Apr	17:30	Bosnia and Herzegovina	2–3	Montenegro	23–25	22–25	25–23	25–22	11–15	106–110	Report
9 Apr	17:30	Switzerland	3–0	Bosnia and Herzegovina	28–26	25–23	25–21			78–70	Report

=== Pool G ===
Pos	Team	Pld	W	L	Pts	SW	SL	SR	SPW	SPL	SPR	Qualification
1	Poland	3	3	0	9	9	0	MAX	225	80	2.813	2022 European Championship
2	Austria	3	2	1	6	6	3	2.000	199	118	1.686	
3	Albania	3	1	2	3	3	6	0.500	149	150	0.993	
4	Ukraine	3	0	3	0	0	9	0.000	0	225	0.000	

Date	Time		Score		Set 1	Set 2	Set 3	Set 4	Set 5	Total	Report
8 Apr	15:00	Ukraine	0–3	Albania	0–25	0–25	0–25			0–75	Report
8 Apr	18:00	Austria	0–3	Poland	11–25	21–25	17–25			49–75	Report
9 Apr	15:00	Austria	3–0	Ukraine	25–0	25–0	25–0			75–0	Report
9 Apr	18:00	Poland	3–0	Albania	25–7	25–7	25–17			75–31	Report
10 Apr	15:00	Poland	3–0	Ukraine	25–0	25–0	25–0			75–0	Report
10 Apr	18:00	Albania	0–3	Austria	18–25	12–25	13–25			43–75	Report

=== Pool H ===
Pos	Team	Pld	W	L	Pts	SW	SL	SR	SPW	SPL	SPR	Qualification
1	Serbia	3	3	0	9	9	0	MAX	226	175	1.291	2022 European Championship
2	Spain	3	1	2	3	4	6	0.667	227	223	1.018	
3	Czech Republic	3	1	2	3	3	6	0.500	182	209	0.871	
4	Belgium	3	1	2	3	3	7	0.429	209	237	0.882	

Date	Time		Score		Set 1	Set 2	Set 3	Set 4	Set 5	Total	Report
8 Apr	16:00	Spain	0–3	Serbia	23–25	21–25	23–25			67–75	Report
8 Apr	19:00	Czech Republic	3–0	Belgium	25–20	25–15	26–24			76–59	Report
9 Apr	16:00	Serbia	3–0	Belgium	25–19	25–12	26–24			76–55	Report
9 Apr	19:00	Spain	3–0	Czech Republic	25–16	25–20	25–17			75–53	Report
10 Apr	16:00	Belgium	3–1	Spain	20–25	25–17	25–23	25–20		95–85	Report
10 Apr	19:00	Serbia	3–0	Czech Republic	25–12	25–20	25–21			75–53	Report

=== Pool I ===
Pos	Team	Pld	W	L	Pts	SW	SL	SR	SPW	SPL	SPR	Qualification
1	Turkey	3	3	0	9	9	0	MAX	227	159	1.428	2022 European Championship
2	Estonia	3	2	1	5	6	6	1.000	247	241	1.025	
3	Hungary	3	1	2	3	4	6	0.667	212	200	1.060	
4	Kosovo	3	0	3	1	2	9	0.222	173	259	0.668	

Date	Time		Score		Set 1	Set 2	Set 3	Set 4	Set 5	Total	Report
8 Apr	16:00	Turkey	3–0	Hungary	25–17	27–25	25–21			77–63	Report
8 Apr	19:00	Estonia	3–2	Kosovo	25–17	21–25	23–25	25–19	15–6	109–92	Report
9 Apr	16:00	Hungary	3–0	Kosovo	25–10	25–15	25–10			75–35	Report
9 Apr	19:00	Turkey	3–0	Estonia	25–18	25–14	25–18			75–50	Report
10 Apr	16:00	Kosovo	0–3	Turkey	16–25	16–25	14–25			46–75	Report
10 Apr	19:00	Hungary	1–3	Estonia	22–25	12–25	25–13	15–25		74–88	Report

=== Ranking of the second placed teams ===
- Matches against the fourth placed team in each pool are not included in this ranking.

Pos	Team	Pld	W	L	Pts	SW	SL	SR	SPW	SPL	SPR	Qualification
1	Slovakia	2	1	1	3	4	3	1.333	160	139	1.151	Third round
2	Netherlands	2	1	1	3	4	3	1.333	149	161	0.925	Third round
3	Spain	2	1	1	3	3	3	1.000	142	128	1.109	Third round
4	Austria	2	1	1	3	3	3	1.000	124	118	1.051	Third round
5	Montenegro	2	1	1	3	5	5	1.000	207	213	0.972	Third round
6	Finland	2	1	1	3	4	4	1.000	164	186	0.882	Third round
7	France	2	1	1	3	3	4	0.750	158	159	0.994	Third round
8	Estonia	2	1	1	3	3	4	0.750	138	149	0.926	Third round
9	Sweden	2	1	1	2	4	5	0.800	168	184	0.913	

== Third round ==
=== Pool J ===
Pos	Team	Pld	W	L	Pts	SW	SL	SR	SPW	SPL	SPR	Qualification
1	Netherlands	3	3	0	9	9	1	9.000	239	194	1.232	2022 European Championship
2	Spain	3	2	1	5	6	6	1.000	261	262	0.996	
3	Estonia	3	1	2	2	4	8	0.500	221	273	0.810	
4	Slovakia	3	0	3	2	5	9	0.556	299	291	1.027	

Date	Time		Score		Set 1	Set 2	Set 3	Set 4	Set 5	Total	Report
1 Jul	16:00	Estonia	0–3	Netherlands	16–25	13–25	18–25			47–75	Report
1 Jul	19:00	Slovakia	2–3	Spain	22–25	23–25	25–15	25–23	15–17	110–105	Report
2 Jul	16:00	Netherlands	3–0	Spain	25–13	25–23	27–25			77–61	Report
2 Jul	19:00	Estonia	3–2	Slovakia	19–25	15–25	25–22	25–18	15–13	99–103	Report
3 Jul	16:00	Netherlands	3–1	Slovakia	12–25	25–23	25–17	25–21		87–86	Report
3 Jul	19:00	Spain	3–1	Estonia	20–25	25–16	25–19	25–15		95–75	Report

=== Pool K ===
Pos	Team	Pld	W	L	Pts	SW	SL	SR	SPW	SPL	SPR	Qualification
1	Finland	3	2	1	7	8	4	2.000	275	228	1.206	2022 European Championship
2	Austria	3	2	1	6	7	5	1.400	265	278	0.953	
3	France	3	2	1	5	7	5	1.400	266	249	1.068	
4	Montenegro	3	0	3	0	1	9	0.111	188	239	0.787	

Date	Time		Score		Set 1	Set 2	Set 3	Set 4	Set 5	Total	Report
1 Jul	17:00	Finland	2–3	France	25–18	19–25	19–25	25–16	14–16	102–100	Report
1 Jul	20:00	Montenegro	1–3	Austria	25–14	22–25	21–25	21–25		89–89	Report
2 Jul	17:00	France	1–3	Austria	25–20	23–25	21–25	22–25		91–95	Report
2 Jul	20:00	Finland	3–0	Montenegro	25–15	25–17	25–15			75–47	Report
3 Jul	17:00	Austria	1–3	Finland	20–25	25–23	21–25	15–25		81–98	Report
3 Jul	20:00	France	3–0	Montenegro	25–18	25–20	25–14			75–52	Report
