= Turkey women's national under-21 volleyball team =

Turkey U20
- Association: Turkish Volleyball Federation
- Confederation: CEV
- Head coach: Gökhan Edman

Uniforms
Home	Away	Third

FIVB U21 World Championship
- Appearances: 8 (First in 1999)
- Best result: 4th Place : 2017
- tvf.org.tr
Honours
European Championship
Gold medal – first place	2024 Bulgaria/Ireland	Team
Gold medal – first place	2012 Ankara	Team
Gold medal – first place	2020 Zenica	Team
Bronze medal – third place	2008 Perugia	Team
Bronze medal – third place	2014 Tartu	Team
Bronze medal – third place	2016 Nitra	Team

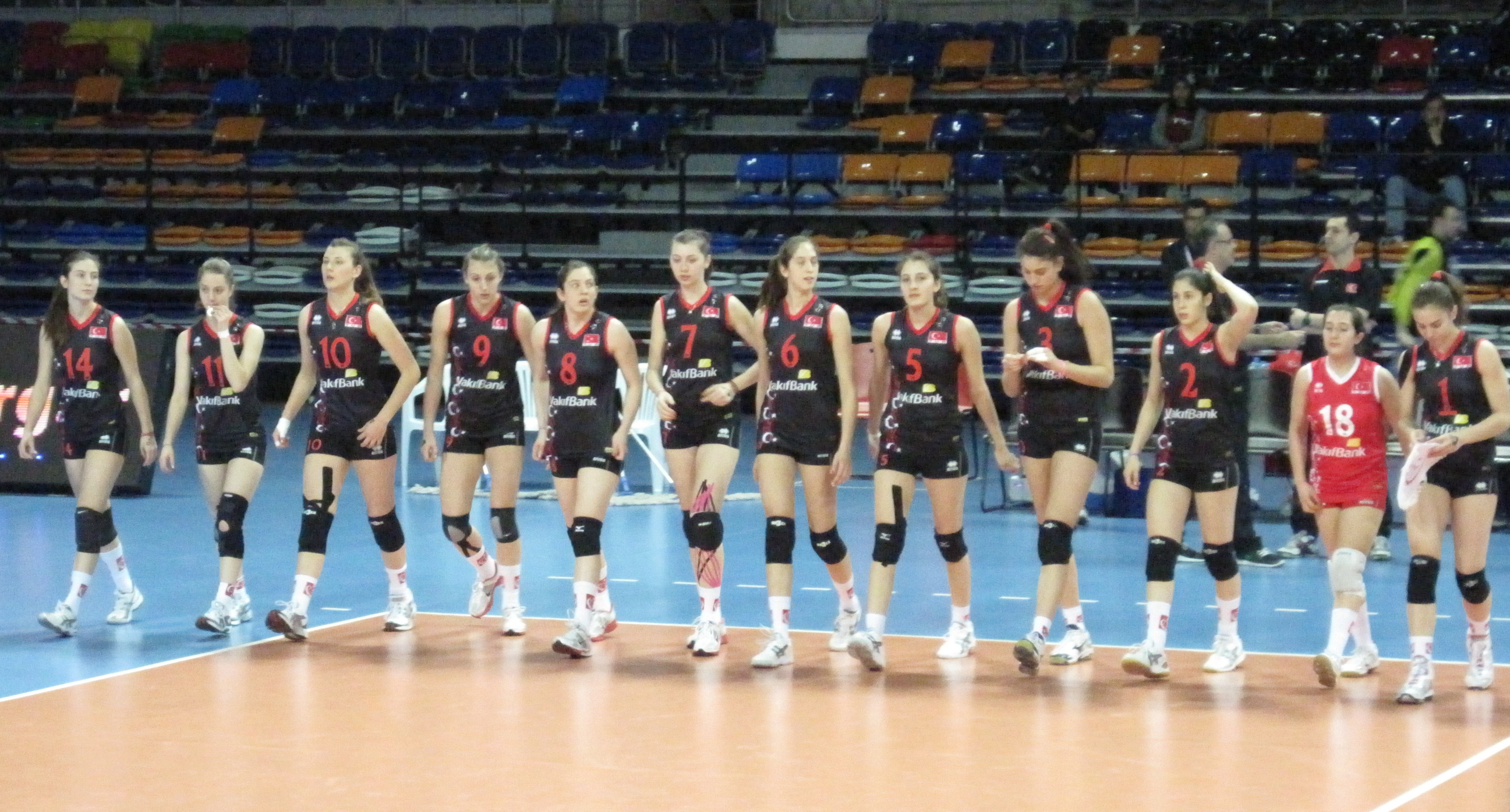
The Turkey women's national under-21 volleyball team in 2011

Turkey women's junior national volleyball team (Turkish: Türkiye Genç Kadın Voleybol Milli Takımı) is the women's under-20 and under-19 national team formed by the Turkish Volleyball Federation (TVF) representing Turkey in international junior volleyball competitions like Women's Junior Volleyball World Championship with the U20 team and Women's Junior European Volleyball Championship with the U19 team.

The team became bronze medalist at the 2008 Women's Junior European Volleyball Championship and champion at the Women's Junior European Volleyball Championship in 2012.

The national team qualified for participation at the 2013 FIVB Women's Junior World Championship, and placed 5th.

== Achievements ==
=== World Championship ===
Year	Position	W	L
U20 team
(Brazil) 1977	Did not start		
(Mexico) 1981	Did not qualify		
(Italy) 1985	Did not qualify		
(South Korea) 1987	Did not qualify		
(Peru) 1989	Did not qualify		
(Czechoslovakia) 1991	Did not qualify		
(Brazil) 1993	Did not qualify		
(Thailand) 1995	Did not qualify		
(Poland) 1997	Did not qualify		
(Canada) 1999	13th	0	3
(Dominican Republic) 2001	8th	3	4
(Thailand) 2003	9th	1	3
(Turkey) 2005	6th	3	4
(Thailand) 2007	Did not qualify		
(Mexico) 2009	7th	5	3
(Peru) 2011	Did not qualify		
(Czech Republic) 2013	5th	7	1
(Puerto Rico) 2015	10th	5	3
(Mexico) 2017	4th	4	4
(Mexico) 2019	4th	4	4
(Belgium) (Netherlands) 2021	10th	5	3
U21 team
(Mexico) 2023	5th	5	3
(Indonesia) 2025	8th	4	5
Total	12/23	46	40

=== Balkan Championship ===
Year	Position	W	L
U19 team
(Turkey) 2019	1st place, gold medalist(s)	4	0
(Romania) 2022	2nd place, silver medalist(s)	4	1
(Bulgaria) 2023	2nd place, silver medalist(s)	2	2
U20 team
(Albania) 2024	1st place, gold medalist(s)	5	0

=== European Championship ===
Year	Position	W	L
U19 team
(Hungary) 1966	10th	2	5
(Soviet Union) 1969	Did not participate		
(Italy) 1971	Did not participate		
(Netherlands) 1973	Did not participate		
(West Germany) 1975	Did not participate		
(Socialist Federal Republic of Yugoslavia) 1977	11th	2	5
(Spain) 1979	Did not participate		
(West Germany) 1982	11th	1	6
(France) 1984	Did not participate		
(Bulgaria) 1986	Did not participate		
(Italy) 1988	12th	0	7
(Austria) 1990	7th	3	4
(Greece) 1992	9th	2	5
(Hungary) 1994	10th	2	5
(Turkey) 1996	11th	2	5
(Belgium) 1998	9th	3	4
(Switzerland) 2000	8th	3	4
(Croatia) 2002	5th	4	3
(Slovakia) 2004	6th	4	3
(France) 2006	5th	5	2
(Italy) 2008	3rd place, bronze medalist(s)	5	2
(Serbia) 2010	5th	5	2
(Turkey) 2012	1st place, gold medalist(s)	6	1
(Finland) (Estonia) 2014	3rd place, bronze medalist(s)	5	2
(Slovakia) (Hungary) 2016	3rd place, bronze medalist(s)	6	1
(Albania) 2018	4th	3	4
(Bosnia and Herzegovina) (Croatia) 2020	1st place, gold medalist(s)	4	1
(North Macedonia) 2022	5th	5	2
U20 team
(Bulgaria) (Republic of Ireland) 2024	1st place, gold medalist(s)	9	0
Total	22/29	81	73

Squads

- 2012 European Championship — Gold medal
  Damla Çakıroğlu, Çağla Akın, Kübra Akman, Şeyma Ercan, Ceylan Arısan, Ceyda Aktaş, Aslı Kalaç, Ece Hocaoğlu, Kübra Kegan, Ecem Alıcı, Dilara Bağcı, Didem Marangoz. Head coach: (Turkey) Gökhan Edman
- 2014 European Championship — Bronze medal
  Melis Yılmaz, Cansu Özbay, Ayça Aykaç, Rida Erlalelitepe, Ada Germen, Aybüke Özdemir, Pelin Aroğuz, Hümay Topaloğlu, Yağmur Mislina Kılıç, Arelya Karasoy, Su Zent, Hande Baladin. Head coach: (Turkey) Mustafa Suphi Doğancı
- 2020 European Championship — Gold medal
  Sude Hacımustafaoğlu, Çağla Salih, Elif Su Eriçek, Lila Şengün, Hanife Nur Özaydınlı, İlayda Uçak, Sude Naz Uzun, İpar Özay Kurt, Aleyna Göçmen, Beren Yeşilırmak, Gülce Güçtekin, Melisa Ege Bükmen. Head coach: (Turkey) Şahin Çatma
- 2024 European Championship — Gold medal
  Selin Çalışkan, Dilay Özdemir, Beren Yeşilırmak, Selen Köse, Şevval Acıbal, Eylül Durgun, Bianka İlayda Mumcular, Liza Safronova, Nisan Eroğuz, Bilge Paşa, Ece Şenyapıcı, Begüm Kaçmaz, Helin Kayıkçı, İlayda Naz Gergef. Head coach: (Turkey) Gökhan Durmaz

=== Current squad (U20 nteam) ===
As of 4 August 2024

Team manager	Ecem Türker
Head coach	(Turkey) Gökhan Durmaz
Assistant coach	(Turkey) Batuhan Ragıp Şen

№	Name	Date of birth	Height m	Weight kg	Spike cm	Block cm	Club	Position
1	Ece Şenyapıcı	24 January 2006	1.88	72	287	233	Fenerbahçe	Middle Blocker
4	Beren Yeşilırmak	1 June 2005	1.84	64	290	268	Zerenspor	Opposite Hitter
5	Begüm Kaçmaz	26 April 2007	1.88	65	296	270	Beşiktaş	Middle Blocker
6	Dilay Özdemir	15 August 2005	1.87	58	295	275	Beşiktaş	Setter
7	İlayda Naz Gergef	2 January 2006	1.74	60			VakıfBank	Libero
9	Nisan Eroğuz	11 April 2006	1.86	70	285	274	VakıfBank	Middle Blocker
11	Selin Çalışkan	3 June 2005	1.83	70	285	265	Nilüfer Belediye	Setter
13	Bianka İlayda Mumcular	18 June 2006	1.88	79	295	280	Zerenspor	Outside Hitter
14	Liza Safronova	17 January 2006	1.90	69	291	283	Fenerbahçe	Outside Hitter
16	Şevval Acıbal	14 November 2005	1.78	65	280	265	Karşıyaka	Outside Hitter
17	Eylül Durgun	4 February 2005	1.89	70	290	265	Karayolları	Outside Hitter
18	Selen Köse	7 April 2005	1.86	69	280	240	Aras Kargo	Outside Hitter
22	Helin Kayıkçı	13 July 2005	1.75	57			Zerenspor	Libero
24	Bilge Paşa	24 October 2005	1.91	78	290	270	Nilüfer Belediye	Middle Blocker

== See also ==
Women's

- Turkey Women's national volleyball team
- Turkey Women's national volleyball team U23
- Turkey Women's national volleyball team U20
- Turkey Women's national volleyball team U19

Men's

- Turkey Men's national volleyball team
- Turkey Men's national volleyball team U23
- Turkey Men's national volleyball team U21
- Turkey Men's national volleyball team U19
