= 1987 FIVB Volleyball Women's U20 World Championship =

1987 FIVB Women's U20 World Championship
Tournament details
- Host country: South Korea
- Dates: September 2–13, 1987
- Teams: 13
- Venues: 2 (in Seoul and Pusan host cities)

Final positions
- Champions: Brazil (1st title)

Tournament awards
- MVP: (Brazil) Ana Moser

The 1987 FIVB Women's U20 World Championship was held in Seoul and Pusan, South Korea from September 2 to 13, 1987. 13 teams participated in the tournament.

== Qualification process ==
Confederation	Method of Qualification	Venue	Date	Vacancies	Qualified
FIVB	Host			1	South Korea
NORCECA	NORCECA Election			2	Canada; Puerto Rico; ~~Cuba~~ *
CSV	1986 South American Junior Championship	São Paulo, Brazil	August 2 – 9, 1986	3	Peru; Brazil; Argentina
CEV	1986 European Junior Championship	Sofia, Bulgaria	August 17 – 24, 1986	3	Soviet Union; Bulgaria; Greece **
AVC	1986 Asian Junior Championship	Bangkok, Thailand	October 18 – 25, 1986	3	Japan; China; Chinese Taipei ***
FIVB	Wild card			1	France
Total				13	

- * Cuba declined to participate because their players lost to many school days when participating in the Panamerican Games.
- ** Greece replaced East Germany.
- *** Chinese Taipei replaced Thailand.

== Pools composition ==
Pool A	Pool B
South Korea; Brazil; Canada; Chinese Taipei; France; Soviet Union; ~~Cuba~~ *	Argentina; Bulgaria; China; Greece; Japan; Peru; Puerto Rico

- Cuba declined to participate.

== Preliminary round ==
=== Pool A ===
Pos	Team	Pld	W	L	Pts	SW	SL	SR	SPW	SPL	SPR	Qualification
1	South Korea	5	5	0	10	15	3	5.000	262	161	1.627	Semifinals
2	Brazil	5	4	1	9	13	5	2.600	238	166	1.434	Semifinals
3	Soviet Union	5	3	2	8	13	6	2.167	258	174	1.483	5th place playoff
4	Canada	5	2	3	7	6	9	0.667	158	181	0.873	5th place playoff
5	Chinese Taipei	5	1	4	6	3	12	0.250	126	190	0.663	9th place playoff
6	France	5	0	5	5	0	15	0.000	55	225	0.244	9th place playoff

Date		Score		Set 1	Set 2	Set 3	Set 4	Set 5	Total
2 Sep	Brazil	3–2	Soviet Union	15–17	6–15	15–6	15–13	15–13	66–64
2 Sep	Chinese Taipei	3–0	France	15–3	15–3	15–3			45–9
2 Sep	South Korea	3–0	Canada	15–5	16–14	15–8			46–27
3 Sep	South Korea	3–1	Brazil	15–3	14–16	15–11	15–7		59–37
3 Sep	Canada	3–0	Chinese Taipei	15–11	15–6	16–14			46–31
4 Sep	Brazil	3–0	Chinese Taipei	15–6	15–2	15–3			45–11
4 Sep	Canada	3–0	France	15–1	15–4	15–9			45–14
5 Sep	South Korea	3–2	Soviet Union	15–11	12–15	10–15	15–7	15–11	67–59
5 Sep	Brazil	3–0	France	15–3	15–1	15–3			45–7
7 Sep	Soviet Union	3–0	Chinese Taipei	15–5	15–8	15–2			45–15
7 Sep	Brazil	3–0	Canada	15–10	15–4	15–11			45–25
8 Sep	South Korea	3–0	Chinese Taipei	15–7	15–9	15–8			45–24
8 Sep	Soviet Union	3–0	France	15–5	15–0	15–6			45–11
9 Sep	South Korea	3–0	France	15–1	15–5	15–8			45–14
9 Sep	Soviet Union	3–0	Canada	15–5	15–8	15–2			45–15

=== Pool B ===
Pos	Team	Pld	W	L	Pts	SW	SL	SR	SPW	SPL	SPR	Qualification
1	Japan	6	5	1	11	16	3	5.333	224	121	1.851	Semifinals
2	China	6	5	1	11	17	4	4.250	293	181	1.619	Semifinals
3	Peru	6	5	1	11	15	6	2.500	287	156	1.840	5th place playoff
4	Bulgaria	6	3	3	9	10	10	1.000	207	227	0.912	5th place playoff
5	Greece	6	2	4	8	7	12	0.583	169	195	0.867	9th place playoff
6	Argentina	6	1	5	7	3	15	0.200	132	246	0.537	9th place playoff
7	Puerto Rico	6	0	6	6	0	18	0.000	84	270	0.311	

Date		Score		Set 1	Set 2	Set 3	Set 4	Set 5	Total
2 Sep	Peru	3–0	Greece	15–3	15–2	15–3			45–8
2 Sep	Japan	3–0	Puerto Rico	15–0	15–0	15–6			45–6
2 Sep	Bulgaria	3–0	Argentina	15–7	15–4	15–7			45–18
3 Sep	Japan	3–0	Argentina	15–4	15–3	15–3			45–10
3 Sep	China	3–0	Bulgaria	15–6	15–3	15–3			45–12
3 Sep	Greece	3–0	Puerto Rico	15–10	15–0	15–8			45–18
4 Sep	China	3–1	Japan	15–7	12–15	15–8	15–11		57–41
4 Sep	Peru	3–0	Puerto Rico	15–2	15–4	15–3			45–9
4 Sep	Greece	3–0	Argentina	15–7	15–11	15–11			45–29
5 Sep	China	3–0	Greece	15–10	15–10	15–8			45–28
5 Sep	Japan	3–0	Bulgaria	15–5	15–4	15–12			45–21
5 Sep	Peru	3–0	Argentina	15–0	15–1	15–8			45–9
7 Sep	Peru	3–2	China	11–15	15–6	15–12	13–15	15–8	69–56
7 Sep	Bulgaria	3–1	Greece	13–15	15–11	15–9	15–8		58–43
7 Sep	Argentina	3–0	Puerto Rico	15–9	15–6	15–6			45–21
8 Sep	Peru	3–1	Bulgaria	11–15	15–6	15–5	15–0		56–26
8 Sep	China	3–0	Puerto Rico	15–3	15–4	15–3			45–10
8 Sep	Japan	3–0	Greece						
9 Sep	Japan	3–0	Peru	15–2	15–9	18–16			48–27
9 Sep	China	3–0	Argentina	15–1	15–13	15–7			45–21
9 Sep	Bulgaria	3–0	Puerto Rico	15–6	15–10	15–4			45–20

== Final round ==
=== 9th–12th places ===
9th–12th places
Chinese Taipei	3
Argentina	0
Greece	3
France	0

9th place
Chinese Taipei	3
Greece	0
11th place
Argentina	3
France	0

=== Classification 9th and 12th ===
Date	Game		
12 Sep	Chinese Taipei	3–0	Argentina
12 Sep	Greece	3–0	France

=== Classification 11th ===
Date	Game		
13 Sep	Argentina	3–0	France

=== Classification 9th ===
Date	Game		
13 Sep	Chinese Taipei	3–0	Greece

=== 5th–8th places ===
5th–8th places
Soviet Union	3
Bulgaria	0
Peru	3
Canada	0

5th place
Soviet Union	3
Peru	1
7th place
Bulgaria	3
Canada	0

=== Classification 5th and 8th ===
Date	Game		
12 Sep	Soviet Union	3–0	Bulgaria
12 Sep	Peru	3–0	Canada

=== Classification 7th ===
Date	Game		
13 Sep	Bulgaria	3–0	Canada

=== Classification 5th ===
Date	Game			Set 1	Set 2	Set 3	Set 4	Set 5	Total
13 Sep	Soviet Union	3–1	Peru	15–10	10–15	15–8	15–6		55–39

=== Championship round ===
Semifinals
Brazil	3
Japan	1
South Korea	3
China	0

Final
Brazil	3
South Korea	0
Third place
Japan	2
China	3

=== Semifinals ===
Date	Game			Set 1	Set 2	Set 3	Set 4	Set 5	Total
12 Sep	Brazil	3–1	Japan	6–15	15–8	15–10	15–13		51–46
12 Sep	South Korea	3–0	China	15–3	15–11	15–9			45–23

=== Bronze medal match ===
Date	Game			Set 1	Set 2	Set 3	Set 4	Set 5	Total
03 Aug	China	3–2	Japan	7–15	15–7	15–9	7–15	15–7	59–53

=== Gold medal match ===
Date	Game			Set 1	Set 2	Set 3	Set 4	Set 5	Total
13 Sep	Brazil	3–0	South Korea	17–15	15–4	16–14			48–33

== Final standing ==
Rank	Team
1st place, gold medalist(s)	Brazil
2nd place, silver medalist(s)	South Korea
3rd place, bronze medalist(s)	China
4	Japan
5	Soviet Union
6	Peru
7	Bulgaria
8	Canada
9	Chinese Taipei
10	Greece
11	Argentina
12	France
13	Puerto Rico

1987 FIVB Women's Junior World champions

Brazil
1st title

12–woman Roster
Kerly Santos, Ana Moser, Denise Souza, Karla Costa, Simone Storm, Ana Lima, Ana Maria Volponi, Fátima dos Santos, Márcia Fu, Cilene Drewnick, Fernanda Venturini and Ingrid Gomes
Head coach
Marco Aurelio Motta

== Individual awards ==
- MVP: (Brazil) Ana Moser
- Best attacker: (Peru) Gabriela Perez del Solar
- Best rookie: (Brazil) Ana Moser
- Best blocker: (Brazil) Kerly Santos
- Best server: (Brazil) Marcia Fu
- Best setter: (Brazil) Simone Storm
- Best coach: (Brazil) Marco Aurelio Motta
