= 2024 Women's U20 Volleyball European Championship =

Tournament details
- Host countries: Bulgaria; Ireland
- Dates: 5–17 August 2024
- Teams: 16
- Venue: (in 2 host cities)

Final positions
- Champions: Turkey (3rd title)
- Runners-up: Italy
- Third place: Belgium
- Fourth place: Poland

Tournament awards
- MVP: (Turkey) Dilay Özdemir
- Best Setter: (Turkey) Dilay Özdemir
- Best OH: (Turkey) Liza Safronova (Turkey) Beren Yeşilırmak
- Best MB: (Italy) Linda Manfredinii (Belgium) Yana Wouters
- Best OPP: (Italy) Maria Teresa Bosso
- Best Libero: (Italy) Anna Bardaro

The 2024 Women's U20 Volleyball European Championship will be the 29th edition of the Women's Junior European Volleyball Championship, a biennial international volleyball tournament organised by the European Volleyball Confederation (CEV) the women's under-20 national teams of Europe. The tournament will be held in Bulgaria and Ireland from 5 to 17 August 2024.

== Host selection ==
- Bulgaria
- Ireland
- Scotland (withdrew)

Originally, Ireland and Scotland were given the hosting rights together on 12 October 2022. However, in August 2023, Scotland withdrew due to financial reasons. Bulgaria took their place as a co-host. Ireland's portion of the event marks the first time a EuroVolley event at any level will be hosted by a nation in the Small Countries Association.

== Qualification ==
Means of qualification		Qualifier
Host countries		Bulgaria
Host countries		Ireland
Qualification 1st round	BVA	Turkey
Qualification 1st round	EEVZA	Poland
Qualification 1st round	MEVZA	Croatia
Qualification 1st round	NEVZA	Sweden
Qualification 1st round	WEVZA	Italy
Qualification 2nd round	Pool A	Serbia
Qualification 2nd round	Pool B	Spain
Qualification 2nd round	Pool C	Ukraine
Qualification 2nd round	Pool D	Czech Republic
Qualification 2nd round	Pool E	Portugal
Qualification 2nd round	Best runner up	Slovenia
Qualification 2nd round	Best runner up	Belgium
Qualification 2nd round	Best runner up	Netherlands
Qualification 2nd round	Best runner up	Finland

== Venues ==
The venues are in Sofia and Dublin.

Pool I, Final round		Pool II	
(Bulgaria) Sofia	Sofia is located in Bulgaria	Dublin	Dublin is located in Ireland
Hristo Botev Hall	Sofia is located in Bulgaria	Sport Ireland National Indoor Arena	Dublin is located in Ireland
Capacity: 1,500	Sofia is located in Bulgaria	Capacity: 1,900	Dublin is located in Ireland

== Draw ==
The draw was held on 12 April 2024 in Luxembourg.

== Group stage ==
=== Pool A ===
- All times are local.

Pos	Team	Pld	W	L	Pts	SW	SL	SR	SPW	SPL	SPR	Qualification
1	Turkey	7	7	0	20	21	2	10.500	548	433	1.266	Semifinals and World Championship
2	Belgium	7	6	1	16	18	9	2.000	621	512	1.213	Semifinals and World Championship
3	Bulgaria (H)	7	4	3	12	14	13	1.077	583	547	1.066	World Championship
4	Croatia	7	4	3	11	14	13	1.077	576	564	1.021	
5	Spain	7	4	3	10	14	14	1.000	606	605	1.002	
6	Netherlands	7	2	5	7	12	18	0.667	640	651	0.983	
7	Slovenia	7	1	6	7	11	18	0.611	547	640	0.855	
8	Sweden	7	0	7	1	4	21	0.190	427	606	0.705	

Source: Report
(H) Host

Date	Time		Score		Set 1	Set 2	Set 3	Set 4	Set 5	Total	Report
5 August	11:30	Spain	1–3	Croatia	23–25	24–26	25–21	14–25		86–97	Report
5 August	14:00	Slovenia	2–3	Netherlands	25–23	13–25	16–25	25–19	13–15	92–107	Report
5 August	16:30	Bulgaria	3–1	Sweden	21–25	25–16	25–10	25–14		96–65	Report
5 August	19:00	Belgium	0–3	Turkey	23–25	20–25	18–25			61–75	Report
6 August	11:30	Sweden	1–3	Netherlands	26–24	18–25	23–25	19–25		86–99	Report
6 August	14:00	Croatia	3–2	Slovenia	25–15	21–25	19–25	25–13	15–12	105–90	Report
6 August	16:30	Bulgaria	0–3	Belgium	23–25	19–25	18–25			60–75	Report
6 August	19:00	Turkey	3–0	Spain	25–19	25–23	25–17			75–59	Report
7 August	11:30	Belgium	3–2	Sweden	25–13	23–25	25–18	23–25	15–4	111–85	Report
7 August	14:00	Slovenia	0–3	Turkey	9–25	20–25	13–25			42–75	Report
7 August	16:30	Spain	3–2	Bulgaria	25–15	16–25	16–25	25–21	15–4	97–90	Report
7 August	19:00	Netherlands	1–3	Croatia	19–25	20–25	25–18	18–25		82–93	Report
9 August	11:30	Belgium	3–1	Spain	25–19	18–25	25–17	25–21		93–82	Report
9 August	14:00	Turkey	3–2	Netherlands	21–25	12–25	25–21	25–21	15–10	98–102	Report
9 August	16:30	Bulgaria	3–2	Slovenia	24–26	25–15	26–24	23–25	15–9	113–99	Report
9 August	19:00	Sweden	0–3	Croatia	15–25	13–25	15–25			43–75	Report
10 August	11:30	Slovenia	0–3	Belgium	6–25	19–25	14–25			39–75	Report
10 August	14:00	Spain	3–0	Sweden	25–22	25–19	25–6			75–47	Report
10 August	16:30	Netherlands	0–3	Bulgaria	22–25	18–25	21–25			61–75	Report
10 August	19:00	Croatia	0–3	Turkey	14–25	22–25	20–25			56–75	Report
12 August	11:30	Sweden	0–3	Turkey	15–25	11–25	18–25			44–75	Report
12 August	14:00	Belgium	3–2	Netherlands	21–25	22–25	25–13	25–23	15–10	108–96	Report
12 August	16:30	Bulgaria	3–1	Croatia	25–16	25–17	15–25	25–17		90–75	Report
12 August	19:00	Spain	3–2	Slovenia	22–25	25–22	25–22	17–25	18–16	107–110	Report
13 August	11:30	Croatia	1–3	Belgium	23–25	25–23	13–25	14–25		75–98	Report
13 August	14:00	Netherlands	1–3	Spain	25–27	20–25	25–22	23–25		93–99	Report
13 August	16:30	Slovenia	3–0	Sweden	25–15	25–23	25–19			75–57	Report
13 August	19:00	Turkey	3–0	Bulgaria	25–19	25–17	25–23			75–59	Report

=== Pool B ===
Pos	Team	Pld	W	L	Pts	SW	SL	SR	SPW	SPL	SPR	Qualification
1	Italy	7	7	0	20	21	4	5.250	610	443	1.377	Semifinals and World Championship
2	Poland	7	6	1	19	20	6	3.333	611	507	1.205	Semifinals and World Championship
3	Czech Republic	7	4	3	12	12	10	1.200	501	437	1.146	World Championship
4	Serbia	7	4	3	11	14	12	1.167	592	564	1.050	
5	Finland	7	3	4	9	12	13	0.923	533	545	0.978	
6	Ukraine	7	3	4	9	11	13	0.846	557	543	1.026	
7	Portugal	7	1	6	4	7	18	0.389	519	567	0.915	
8	Ireland (H)	7	0	7	0	0	21	0.000	205	525	0.390	

Source: Report
(H) Host

Date	Time		Score		Set 1	Set 2	Set 3	Set 4	Set 5	Total	Report
5 August	13:30	Serbia	3–1	Ukraine	21–25	27–25	25–22	28–26		101–98	Report
5 August	16:00	Italy	3–0	Czech Republic	25–21	25–19	25–19			75–59	Report
5 August	18:30	Ireland	0–3	Portugal	12–25	8–25	11–25			31–75	Report
5 August	21:00	Poland	3–1	Finland	25–11	25–19	17–25	25–20		92–75	Report
6 August	13:30	Italy	3–0	Portugal	25–23	25–16	25–19			75–58	Report
6 August	16:00	Serbia	0–3	Poland	22–25	24–26	14–25			60–76	Report
6 August	18:30	Czech Republic	3–1	Finland	25–20	17–25	25–18	25–11		92–74	Report
6 August	21:00	Ukraine	3–0	Ireland	25–11	25–12	25–8			75–31	Report
7 August	12:30	Portugal	0–3	Finland	24–26	16–25	19–25			59–76	Report
7 August	15:00	Ireland	0–3	Czech Republic	11–25	10–25	11–25			32–75	Report
7 August	18:30	Poland	3–1	Ukraine	25–23	22–25	26–24	25–16		98–88	Report
7 August	21:00	Italy	3–1	Serbia	20–25	25–19	25–17	25–18		95–79	Report
9 August	13:30	Czech Republic	0–3	Poland	19–25	21–25	18–25			58–75	Report
9 August	16:00	Finland	3–0	Ireland	25–9	25–14	25–7			75–30	Report
9 August	18:30	Serbia	3–2	Portugal	21–25	23–25	25–20	25–17	15–13	109–100	Report
9 August	21:00	Ukraine	0–3	Italy	21–25	16–25	22–25			59–75	Report
10 August	13:30	Serbia	1–3	Finland	23–25	25–17	19–25	24–26		91–93	Report
10 August	16:00	Italy	3–0	Ireland	25–1	25–2	25–12			75–15	Report
10 August	18:30	Poland	3–1	Portugal	21–25	25–20	25–14	25–22		96–81	Report
10 August	21:00	Ukraine	0–3	Czech Republic	20–25	21–25	14–25			55–75	Report
12 August	13:30	Finland	0–3	Ukraine	27–29	16–25	23–25			66–79	Report
12 August	16:00	Portugal	0–3	Czech Republic	25–27	12–25	12–25			49–77	Report
12 August	18:30	Ireland	0–3	Serbia	12–25	13–25	12–25			37–75	Report
12 August	21:00	Poland	2–3	Italy	15–25	25–27	25–23	25–23	9–15	99–113	Report
13 August	13:30	Portugal	1–3	Ukraine	23–25	19–25	25–21	30–32		97–103	Report
13 August	16:00	Czech Republic	0–3	Serbia	25–27	18–25	22–25			65–77	Report
13 August	18:30	Finland	1–3	Italy	16–25	15–25	29–27	14–25		74–102	Report
13 August	21:00	Ireland	0–3	Poland	12–25	12–25	8–25			32–75	Report

== Final round ==
Semifinals
16 August
Turkey	3
Poland	1
16 August
Italy	3
Belgium	1

Final
17 August
Turkey	3
Italy	2
3rd place match
17 August
Poland	2
Belgium	3

=== Semifinals ===
Date	Time		Score		Set 1	Set 2	Set 3	Set 4	Set 5	Total	Report
16 Aug	15:30	Turkey	3–1	Poland	25–14	22–25	25–17	25–18		97–74	Report
16 Aug	18:30	Italy	3–1	Belgium	18–25	28–26	25–17	25–21		96–89	Report

=== 3rd place match ===
Date	Time		Score		Set 1	Set 2	Set 3	Set 4	Set 5	Total	Report
17 Aug	15:30	Poland	2–3	Belgium	23–25	25–21	25–13	15–25	10–15	98–99	Report

=== Final ===
Date	Time		Score		Set 1	Set 2	Set 3	Set 4	Set 5	Total	Report
17 Aug	18:30	Turkey	3–2	Italy	22–25	25–16	25–19	17–25	15–11	104–96	Report

== Final standing ==
Rank	Team
1st place, gold medalist(s)	Turkey
2nd place, silver medalist(s)	Italy
3rd place, bronze medalist(s)	Belgium
4	Poland
5	Bulgaria
6	Czech Republic
7	Croatia
8	Serbia
9	Spain
10	Finland
11	Ukraine
12	Netherlands
13	Slovenia
14	Portugal
15	Sweden
16	Ireland

Qualified for the 2025 U21 World Championship

2024 European Women's U20 champions

Turkey
Third title

== Awards ==
- Most valuable player
  (Turkey) Dilay Özdemir
- Best setter
  (Turkey) Dilay Özdemir
- Best outside spikers
  (Turkey) Liza Safronova
  (Turkey) Beren Yeşilırmak
- Best middle blockers
  (Italy) Linda Manfredinii
  (Belgium) Yana Wouters
- Best opposite spiker
  (Italy) Maria Teresa Bosso
- Best libero
  (Italy) Anna Bardaro
