= Finland women's national under-21 volleyball team =

Finland U20
- Association: Finnish Volleyball Federation
- Confederation: CEV

Uniforms
Home	Away	Third

FIVB U21 World Championship
- Appearances: 1 (First in 1985)
- Best result: 14th Place : (1985)

Europe U19 Championship
- Appearances: 3 (First in 1979)
- Best result: 8th place : (2022)
- www.lentopalloliitto.fi/en (in English)

The Finland women's national under-20 volleyball team represents Finland in international women's volleyball competitions and friendly matches under the age 20 and it is ruled by the Finnish Volleyball Federation That is an affiliate of Federation of International Volleyball FIVB and also a part of European Volleyball Confederation CEV.

== Results ==
=== FIVB U21 World Championship ===
Champions Runners up Third place Fourth place

FIVB U21 World Championship
Year	Round	Position	Pld	W	L	SW	SL	Squad
(Brazil) → 1977	Didn't qualify							
(Mexico) ← 1981	Didn't qualify							
(Italy) 1985		14th place						Squad
(South Korea) → 1987	Didn't qualify							
(Belgium) (Netherlands) ← 2021	Didn't qualify							
Total	0 Titles	1/21						

=== Europe Junior Championship ===
Champions Runners up Third place Fourth place

Europe Junior Championship
Year	Round	Position	Pld	W	L	SW	SL	Squad
(Hungary) → 1966	Didn't qualify							
(Socialist Federal Republic of Yugoslavia) ← 1977	Didn't qualify							
(Spain) 1979		11th place						Squad
(West Germany) → 1982	Didn't qualify							
(Turkey) ← 2012	Didn't qualify							
(Finland) / (Estonia) 2014		12th place						Squad
2016 Q	Third Round	Third Placed						Squad
2018 Q	Second Round	Third Placed						Squad
2020 Q	Second Round	Third Placed						Squad
(North Macedonia) 2022		8th place						Squad
(Bulgaria) / (Republic of Ireland) 2024		10th place						Squad
(Italy) / (Malta) 2027								Squad
Total	0 title	5/30						

== Team ==
=== Current squad ===
The Following players is the Finnish players that Competed in the 2018 Women's U19 Volleyball European Championship Qualifications

#	name	position	height	weight	birthday	spike	block
	autere ella	middle-blocker	189	76	2000	293	289
	haatainen nea emilia	middle-blocker	185	70	2000	287	282
	heikkilä tiina	opposite	183	71	2000	283	276
	heikkiniemi roosa	outside-spiker	175	67	2000	283	270
	hirvonen alisa	outside-spiker	178	70	2000	285	278
	jäärni jemina	outside-spiker	178	68	2001	285	280
	jantunen jenni	middle-blocker	181	72	2001	285	275
	kaikkonen jenny	outside-spiker	177	68	2001	275	265
	kaukoranta taija	setter	170	60	2000	280	265
	kokkonen suvi	outside-spiker	183	72	2000	300	288
	laaksonen netta	outside-spiker	174	62	2001	283	276
	lindgren saana	opposite	188	77	2000	295	285
	mehtola inka	middle-blocker	181	70	2001	277	271
	piesanen milja	libero	160	52	2000	276	260
	prihti wilhelmiina	outside-spiker	181	67	2001	295	286
	rantanen elli	setter	172	66	2001	276	265
	rekola netta	middle-blocker	183	71	2000	286	280
	riikonen jutta	outside-spiker	179	70	2000	283	270
	roivainen pipsa-pauliina	setter	182	69	2000	289	282
	salmela petra	setter	170	65	2000	283	279
	salminen jessica	outside-spiker	176	68	2001	281	270
	tuominen tuuli	libero	174	67	2001	284	268
	virtanen salla	setter	165	58	2001	265	246
	yli-sissala bettina	middle-blocker	178	68	2000	285	270
