= Norway women's national under-21 volleyball team =

Norway U20
- Association: Norwegian Volleyball Federation
- Confederation: CEV

Uniforms
Home	Away	Third

FIVB U21 World Championship
- Appearances: No Appearances

Europe U19 Championship
- Appearances: No Appearances

The Norway women's national under-20 volleyball team represents Norway in international women's volleyball competitions and friendly matches under the age 20 and it is ruled by the Norwegian Volleyball Federation That is an affiliate of Federation of International Volleyball FIVB and also a part of European Volleyball Confederation CEV.

== Results ==
=== FIVB U20 World Championship ===
Champions Runners up Third place Fourth place

FIVB U20 World Championship
Year	Round	Position	Pld	W	L	SW	SL	Squad
(Brazil) 1977 To (Belgium) (Netherlands) 2021	Didn't qualify							
Total	0 Titles	0/21						

=== Europe U19 Championship ===
Champions Runners up Third place Fourth place

Europe U19 Championship
Year	Round	Position	Pld	W	L	SW	SL	Squad
(Hungary) 1966	Didn't qualify							
(Soviet Union) 1969	Didn't qualify							
(Italy) 1971	Didn't qualify							
(Netherlands) 1973	Didn't qualify							
(West Germany) 1975	Didn't qualify							
(Socialist Federal Republic of Yugoslavia) 1977	Didn't qualify							
(Spain) 1979	Didn't qualify							
(West Germany) 1982	Didn't qualify							
(France) 1984	Didn't qualify							
(Bulgaria) 1986	Didn't qualify							
(Italy) 1988	Didn't qualify							
(Austria) 1990	Didn't qualify							
(Greece) 1992	Didn't qualify							
(Hungary) 1994	Didn't qualify							
(Turkey) 1996	Didn't qualify							
(Belgium) 1998	Didn't qualify							

Europe U19 Championship
Year	Round	Position	Pld	W	L	SW	SL	Squad
(Switzerland) 2000	Didn't Qualify							
(Croatia) 2002	Didn't Qualify							
(Slovakia) 2004	Didn't Qualify							
(France) 2006	Didn't Qualify							
(Italy) 2008	Didn't Qualify							
(Serbia) 2010	Didn't Qualify							
(Turkey) 2012	Didn't Qualify							
(Finland) / (Estonia) 2014	Didn't Qualify							
2016 Q	Group Stages	4th Place						
2018 Q	Group Stages	4th Place						
2020 Q	Group Stages	Third Place						
2022 Q	On Hold							
Total	0 Titles	0/27						

== Team ==
=== Previous squad ===
The Following Players Represents Norway in the 2022 Women's U19 Volleyball European Championship Qualification

#	name	position	height	weight	birthday	spike	block
1	STAVEM Ane	Outside spiker	179	60	2004	295	234
2	VAIGAFA Ariel	Opposite	179	60	2004	295	237
3	HÅKSTAD Aurora	Outside spiker	178	80	2004	290	233
4	HANSEN Eline	Libero	160	60	2004	249	207
5	ENEVOLDSEN Tuva Melund	Setter	168	60	2004	276	219
6	STAVEM Helma	Setter	173	60	2004	280	222
7	SØRGULEN Jenny	Setter	174	60	2004	280	227
8	MOI TENNØY Julia	Opposite	183	60	2005	294	240
9	HALLERAKER Malin Nummedal	Middle blocker	193	60	2005	300	255
10	FLATEKVÅL Kaja Markhus	Outside spiker	172	60	2004	285	223
11	SUNDE Solveig Gladsøy	Outside spiker	178	60	2005	293	235
12	DAHL-SIGURDSEN Madelen	Middle blocker	173	60	2004	290	224
14	ØVERENG Nora Jenny	Middle blocker	184	60	2004	300	240
15	ØVERENG Hedda Jonette	Middle blocker	185	60	2004	298	240
16	Pedersen Elise Munkejord	Libero	172	60	2004	294	223
17	EKELAND Ingrid Marie	Middle blocker	179	60	2005	285	234
18	GJERDE Vera	Setter	174	60	2005	274	228
19	GUDDAL Sara Kvalvågnes	Middle blocker	189	60	2005	287	247
20	HAUGHOM Julianne	Middle blocker	181	60	2004	300	270
21	Kleivane Lisa	Opposite	185	60	2005	298	245
22	MOLLAND Elinor Steen	Opposite	179	60	2005	296	234
