= Greece women's national under-21 volleyball team =

Greece U20
- Association: Hellenic Volleyball Federation
- Confederation: CEV

Uniforms
Home	Away	Third

FIVB U21 World Championship
- Appearances: 1 (First in 1987)
- Best result: 10th place : (1987)

Europe U19 Championship
- Appearances: 8 (First in 1986)
- Best result: 4th place : (2014)
- Official Website

The Greece women's national under-20 volleyball team represents Greece in international women's volleyball competitions and friendly matches under the age 20 and it is ruled by the Hellenic Volleyball Federation That is an affiliate of Federation of International Volleyball FIVB and also a part of European Volleyball Confederation CEV.

== Results ==
=== FIVB U21 World Championship ===
Champions Runners up Third place Fourth place

FIVB U21 World Championship
Year	Round	Position	Pld	W	L	SW	SL	Squad
(Brazil) → 1977	Didn't qualify							
(Italy) ← 1985	Didn't qualify							
(South Korea) 1987		10th place						Squad
(Peru) → 1989	Didn't qualify							
(Belgium) (Netherlands) ← 2021	Didn't qualify							
Total	0 Titles	1/21						

=== Europe Junior Championship ===
Champions Runners up Third place Fourth place

Europe Junior Championship
Year	Round	Position	Pld	W	L	SW	SL	Squad
(Hungary) → 1966	Didn't qualify							
(France) ← 1984	Didn't qualify							
(Bulgaria) 1986		12th place						Squad
(Italy) 1988		10th place						Squad
(Austria) 1990		10th place						Squad
(Greece) 1992		8th place						Squad
(Hungary) 1994		12th place						Squad
(Turkey) 1996		7th place						Squad
(Belgium) → 1998	Didn't qualify							
(Turkey) ← 2012	Didn't qualify							
(Finland) / (Estonia) 2014		4th place						Squad
(Hungary) / (Slovakia) → 2016	Didn't qualify							
(Bosnia and Herzegovina) (Croatia) ← 2020	Didn't qualify							
(North Macedonia) 2022		9th place						Squad
Total	0 title	8/28						

== Team ==
=== Current squad ===
The Following players is the Greek players that Competed in the 2018 Women's U19 Volleyball European Championship

#	name	position	height	weight	birthday	spike	block
	Alexakou effrosyni	outside-spiker	180	77	2000	272	265
	Antypa styliani	outside-spiker	176	62	2002	272	265
	Bakodimou effrosyni	outside-spiker	177	65	2000	284	286
	Charitonidi ioanna-foteini	outside-spiker	179	58	2001	273	269
	Chounta spyridoula	outside-spiker	180	70	2000	279	278
	Fliakou paraskevi evelina	setter	177	65	2000	278	268
	Galanou anastasia	opposite	187	77	2001	278	268
	Georgatzi ioanna	outside-spiker	187	70	2001	285	282
	Gkoltsiou Georgia	opposite	182	64	2000	282	277
	Gounou anastasia	opposite	180	71	2001	281	280
	Iliopoulou elisavet	setter	176	60	2001	273	264
	Kalapoda maria ioanna	middle-blocker	186	70	2001	283	281
	Karakasi eleni	setter	182	63	2000	282	277
	Karavokyri alexandra	libero	164	57	2000	260	256
	Kathariou ariadni	middle-blocker	184	72	2000	289	283
	Kotta christina	libero	165	58	2000	254	248
	Kyparissi stamatia	outside-spiker	184	59	2002	289	283
	Marinaki chara	middle-blocker	183	69	2001	283	275
	Petrinoli olga	libero	164	50	2002	254	248
	Tselepi Georgia	opposite	182	64	2000	278	276
	Tsiogka andromachi	middle-blocker	190	69	2001	291	288
	Tsitsigianni maria	opposite	186	67	2000	283	281
	Tziarli dimitra	middle-blocker	186	67	2000	283	281
	Vogiatzoglou athina	setter	175	55	2001	273	264
	Zampati olga	outside-spiker	180	59	2000	283	280
	Zoidou elpiniki	setter	170	60	2000	270	262
