= Helin Kayıkçı =

Turkish volleyball player (born 2005)

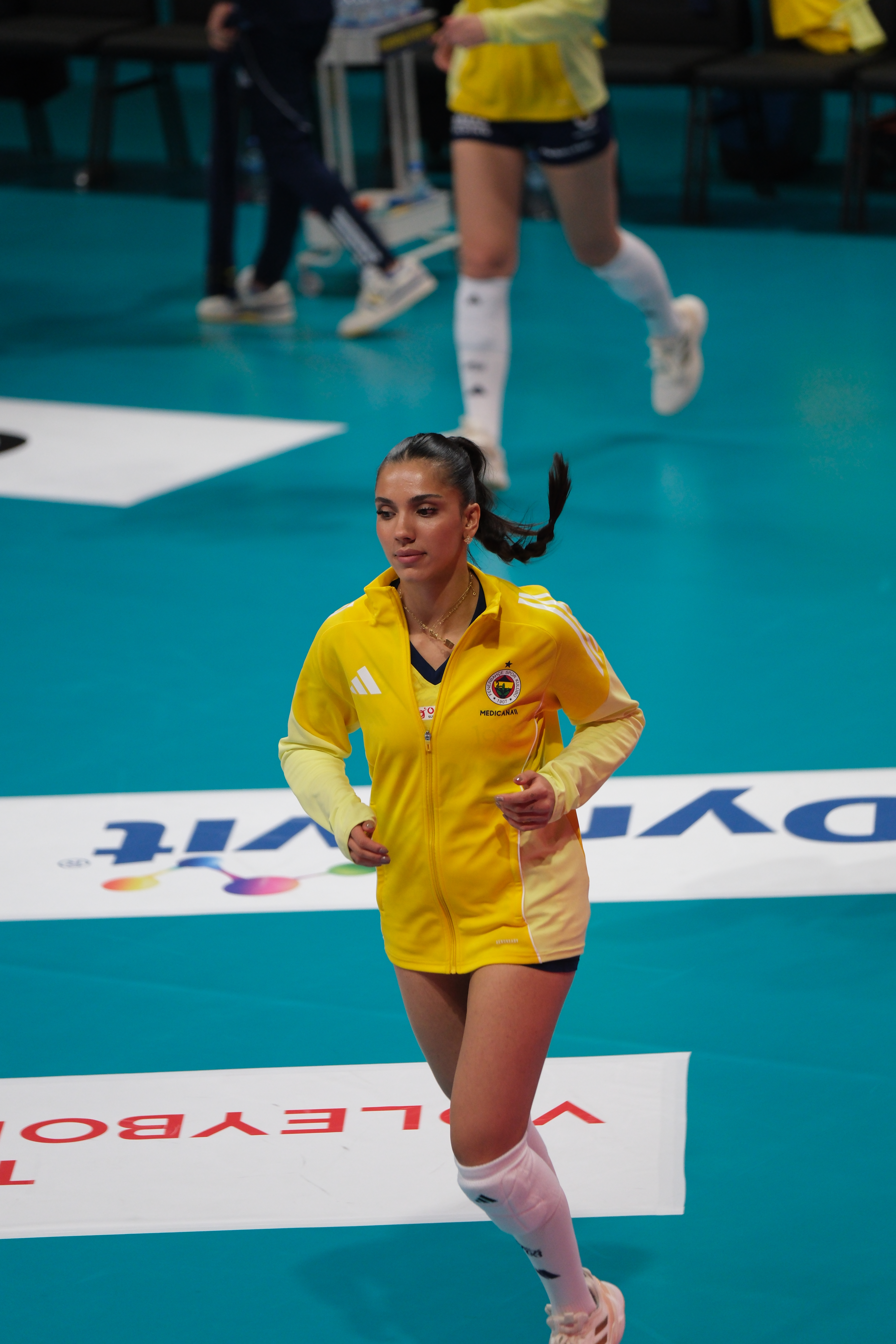

Personal information
- Full name: Helin Kayıkçı
- Born: July 13, 2005 (age 21); Ankara, Turkey
- Height: 1.75 m (5 ft 9 in)
- Weight: 57 kg (126 lb)

Volleyball information
- Position: Libero
- Current club: Fenerbahçe

Career
Years
- 2021–2024
- 2024–2025
- 2025–
Teams
- Fenerbahçe II
- Zeren Spor Kulübü
- Fenerbahçe

Helin Kayıkçı (born July 13, 2005 in Ankara, Turkey) is a Turkish volleyball player. She is 175 cm (5.74 ft) tall at 57 kg (126 lb) and plays in the libero position. She plays for Fenerbahçe of the CEV Champions League and Sultanlar Ligi.

== Career ==
She started her career with Fenerbahçe U18 team in the 2021–22 season, then became professional for Fenerbahçe in the 2021–22 season, and also played for Zeren Spor Kulübü in the 2024–25 season.

== International ==
She plays for Turkey women's national under-21 volleyball team.

== Honours ==
=== Club ===
(Turkey) Fenerbahçe

- Turkish Super Cup: 2025

=== National ===
(Turkey) Youth National Team

- FIVB U20 European Championship: 2024
- Balkan Volleyball U21 Championship: 2024, 2025
- Balkan Volleyball U18 Championship: 2022
