= Kerly =

- Gender: Female

Other names
- Related names: Gerli, Kerli

Kerly is a feminine given name.

People named Kerly include:

- Kerly Théus (born 1999), Haitian footballer
- Kerly Santos (born 1970), Brazilian volleyball player
