= 2022 Women's U19 Volleyball European Championship squads =

This article shows the roster of all participating teams at the 2022 Women's U19 Volleyball European Championship.

== Pool I ==
=== North Macedonia ===
The following is the North Macedonia roster in the 2022 Women's U19 Volleyball European Championship.

Head coach: Stefan Paunovic

| No. | Pos. | Name | Date of birth | Height | Spike | Block | Club |
|---|---|---|---|---|---|---|---|
| 1 | OH | Ana Janichikj | 12 May 2004 (aged 18) | 1.79 m (5 ft 10 in) | 281 cm (111 in) | 272 cm (107 in) | |
| 2 | OH | Meri Boshkovska | 6 June 2005 (aged 17) | 1.86 m (6 ft 1 in) | 284 cm (112 in) | 281 cm (111 in) | |
| 3 | L | Nadica Anteska | 12 April 2004 (aged 18) | 1.70 m (5 ft 7 in) | 261 cm (103 in) | 257 cm (101 in) | |
| 4 | MB | Marija Paketova | 7 May 2004 (aged 18) | 1.78 m (5 ft 10 in) | 275 cm (108 in) | 268 cm (106 in) | |
| 6 | S | Sofija Pandeva | 18 July 2005 (aged 17) | 1.67 m (5 ft 6 in) | 272 cm (107 in) | 260 cm (100 in) | |
| 7 | OH | Dobrina Hadji Toseva | 18 March 2005 (aged 17) | 1.82 m (6 ft 0 in) | 280 cm (110 in) | 273 cm (107 in) | |
| 8 | S | Mihaela Cvetanovska | 11 April 2004 (aged 18) | 1.67 m (5 ft 6 in) | 267 cm (105 in) | 258 cm (102 in) | |
| 10 | OH | Mila Doldurova | 16 December 2004 (aged 17) | 1.79 m (5 ft 10 in) | 265 cm (104 in) | 260 cm (100 in) | |
| 12 | OH | Mila Vakuvska | 4 January 2004 (aged 18) | 1.84 m (6 ft 0 in) | 286 cm (113 in) | 278 cm (109 in) | |
| 13 | S | Mia Gjorgievska | 8 June 2006 (aged 16) | 1.76 m (5 ft 9 in) | 268 cm (106 in) | 263 cm (104 in) | |
| 14 | OH | Anastasija Ovnarska | 24 June 2005 (aged 17) | 1.75 m (5 ft 9 in) | 273 cm (107 in) | 267 cm (105 in) | |
| 17 | MB | Adea Vela | 13 January 2007 (aged 15) | 1.85 m (6 ft 1 in) | 283 cm (111 in) | 277 cm (109 in) | |
| 18 | MB | Iva Stojkoska | 25 April 2005 (aged 17) | 1.86 m (6 ft 1 in) | 283 cm (111 in) | 281 cm (111 in) | |
| 19 | L | Zorana Stankovska | 9 February 2004 (aged 18) | 1.62 m (5 ft 4 in) | 251 cm (99 in) | 249 cm (98 in) | |

=== Poland ===
The following is the Poland roster in the 2022 Women's U19 Volleyball European Championship.

Head coach: Wiesław Popik

| No. | Pos. | Name | Date of birth | Height | Spike | Block | Club |
|---|---|---|---|---|---|---|---|
| 1 | L | Magda Kubas | 28 January 2004 (aged 18) | 1.72 m (5 ft 8 in) | 283 cm (111 in) | 269 cm (106 in) | |
| 3 | OH | Karolina Staniszewska (c) | 20 September 2004 (aged 17) | 1.78 m (5 ft 10 in) | 298 cm (117 in) | 284 cm (112 in) | |
| 4 | S | Pola Janicka | 3 March 2004 (aged 18) | 1.82 m (6 ft 0 in) | 297 cm (117 in) | 286 cm (113 in) | |
| 7 | OH | Natalia Bandurska | 24 November 2004 (aged 17) | 1.77 m (5 ft 10 in) | 292 cm (115 in) | 281 cm (111 in) | |
| 8 | OP | Martyna Podlaska | 31 May 2006 (aged 16) | 1.89 m (6 ft 2 in) | 299 cm (118 in) | 278 cm (109 in) | |
| 10 | MB | Natalia Kecher | 1 February 2004 (aged 18) | 1.92 m (6 ft 4 in) | 303 cm (119 in) | 289 cm (114 in) | |
| 11 | L | Klaudia Łyduch | 19 February 2004 (aged 18) | 1.72 m (5 ft 8 in) | 289 cm (114 in) | 273 cm (107 in) | |
| 13 | MB | Oliwia Nastawska | 20 April 2005 (aged 17) | | | | |
| 14 | MB | Rozalia Moszyńska | 9 March 2005 (aged 17) | 1.90 m (6 ft 3 in) | 303 cm (119 in) | 290 cm (110 in) | |
| 15 | OP | Olga Musiał | 17 June 2004 (aged 18) | 1.87 m (6 ft 2 in) | 318 cm (125 in) | 295 cm (116 in) | |
| 16 | OH | Edyta Wacławczyk | 28 August 2004 (aged 17) | 1.83 m (6 ft 0 in) | 295 cm (116 in) | 282 cm (111 in) | |
| 17 | MB | Justyna Jankowska | 5 January 2004 (aged 18) | 1.91 m (6 ft 3 in) | 306 cm (120 in) | 286 cm (113 in) | |
| 20 | S | Wiktoria Szewczyk | 17 September 2007 (aged 14) | 1.82 m (6 ft 0 in) | 290 cm (110 in) | 274 cm (108 in) | |
| 21 | OH | Barbara Latos | 21 March 2004 (aged 18) | | | | |

=== Italy ===
The following is the Italy roster in the 2022 Women's U19 Volleyball European Championship.

Head coach: Marco Mencarelli

| No. | Pos. | Name | Date of birth | Height | Spike | Block | Club |
|---|---|---|---|---|---|---|---|
| 1 | MB | Nausica Acciarri | 25 September 2004 (aged 17) | 1.86 m (6 ft 1 in) | 310 cm (120 in) | 294 cm (116 in) | Azzurra Volley Firenze |
| 2 | MB | Nicole Modesti | 16 March 2004 (aged 18) | 1.89 m (6 ft 2 in) | 306 cm (120 in) | 290 cm (110 in) | Pro Victoria Pallavolo |
| 3 | OH | Dominika Giuliani (c) | 26 November 2004 (aged 17) | 1.91 m (6 ft 3 in) | 316 cm (124 in) | 302 cm (119 in) | Imoco Volley |
| 4 | OP | Virginia Adriano | 22 July 2004 (aged 18) | 1.92 m (6 ft 4 in) | 300 cm (120 in) | 294 cm (116 in) | Chieri 76 Volleyball |
| 5 | MB | Matilde Munarini | 3 June 2004 (aged 18) | 1.87 m (6 ft 2 in) | 304 cm (120 in) | 292 cm (115 in) | Volley Millenium Brescia |
| 6 | S | Ilaria Batte | 27 June 2005 (aged 17) | 1.84 m (6 ft 0 in) | 296 cm (117 in) | 288 cm (113 in) | Volleyrò CDP Roma |
| 7 | OH | Giulia Viscioni | 13 August 2004 (aged 18) | 1.85 m (6 ft 1 in) | 308 cm (121 in) | 290 cm (110 in) | Pallavolo Scandicci |
| 9 | L | Manuela Ribechi | 15 February 2004 (aged 18) | 1.70 m (5 ft 7 in) | 302 cm (119 in) | 284 cm (112 in) | Pallavolo Scandicci |
| 10 | S | Viola Passaro | 30 November 2004 (aged 17) | 1.80 m (5 ft 11 in) | 294 cm (116 in) | 290 cm (110 in) | Imoco Volley |
| 13 | L | Arianna Gambini | 14 April 2005 (aged 17) | 1.84 m (6 ft 0 in) | 300 cm (120 in) | 281 cm (111 in) | Sc. Pallavolo Anderlini Modena |
| 14 | OH | Lisa Esposito | 25 September 2005 (aged 16) | 1.87 m (6 ft 2 in) | 318 cm (125 in) | 292 cm (115 in) | Volleyrò CDP Roma |
| 15 | OP | Julia Ituma | 8 October 2004 (aged 17) | 1.91 m (6 ft 3 in) | 332 cm (131 in) | 314 cm (124 in) | Pallavolo Scandicci |
| 17 | MB | Omonigho Princess Atamah | 1 March 2005 (aged 17) | 1.88 m (6 ft 2 in) | 314 cm (124 in) | 299 cm (118 in) | Volleyrò CDP Roma |
| 20 | OH | Anna Bardaro | 29 April 2005 (aged 17) | 1.72 m (5 ft 8 in) | 296 cm (117 in) | 288 cm (113 in) | Imoco Volley |

=== Slovenia ===
The following is the Slovenia roster in the 2022 Women's U19 Volleyball European Championship.

Head coach: Samo Miklavc

| No. | Pos. | Name | Date of birth | Height | Spike | Block | Club |
|---|---|---|---|---|---|---|---|
| 2 | L | Urška Cikač | 13 May 2004 (aged 18) | 1.67 m (5 ft 6 in) | 263 cm (104 in) | 261 cm (103 in) | |
| 4 | L | Adela Škoflek | 17 February 2004 (aged 18) | 1.59 m (5 ft 3 in) | 255 cm (100 in) | 237 cm (93 in) | |
| 6 | OH | Selena Leban | 23 April 2005 (aged 17) | 1.78 m (5 ft 10 in) | 290 cm (110 in) | 275 cm (108 in) | |
| 7 | S | Ula Gorjup | 11 April 2005 (aged 17) | 1.77 m (5 ft 10 in) | 281 cm (111 in) | 265 cm (104 in) | |
| 9 | MB | Žana Godec | 28 March 2004 (aged 18) | 1.78 m (5 ft 10 in) | 288 cm (113 in) | 272 cm (107 in) | |
| 14 | OP | Isa Ramič | 18 February 2004 (aged 18) | 1.89 m (6 ft 2 in) | 290 cm (110 in) | 277 cm (109 in) | |
| 15 | MB | Nika Milošič | 20 June 2005 (aged 17) | 1.87 m (6 ft 2 in) | 305 cm (120 in) | 286 cm (113 in) | |
| 17 | MB | Neja Čižman | 18 June 2004 (aged 18) | 1.78 m (5 ft 10 in) | 305 cm (120 in) | 295 cm (116 in) | |
| 18 | S | Ivana Žana Halužan Sagadin (c) | 9 June 2004 (aged 18) | 1.75 m (5 ft 9 in) | 284 cm (112 in) | 268 cm (106 in) | |
| 20 | MB | Tia Koren | 8 July 2004 (aged 18) | 1.81 m (5 ft 11 in) | 291 cm (115 in) | 275 cm (108 in) | |
| 21 | OH | Neja Vidali | 9 April 2004 (aged 18) | 1.74 m (5 ft 9 in) | 284 cm (112 in) | 275 cm (108 in) | |
| 22 | MB | Ajda Gornjec Hodnik | 1 October 2005 (aged 16) | 1.83 m (6 ft 0 in) | 281 cm (111 in) | 268 cm (106 in) | |
| 23 | OP | Polona Frelih | 28 April 2004 (aged 18) | 1.84 m (6 ft 0 in) | 299 cm (118 in) | 288 cm (113 in) | |
| 24 | OP | Nina Svetina | 8 March 2005 (aged 17) | | | | |

=== Greece ===
The following is the Greece roster in the 2022 Women's U19 Volleyball European Championship.

Head coach: Anestis Giannakopoulos

| No. | Pos. | Name | Date of birth | Height | Spike | Block | Club |
|---|---|---|---|---|---|---|---|
| 1 | S | Evangelia Tani (c) | 22 July 2004 (aged 18) | 1.83 m (6 ft 0 in) | 267 cm (105 in) | 278 cm (109 in) | Aris |
| 2 | OP | Anna-Christina Brouma | 6 October 2006 (aged 15) | 1.88 m (6 ft 2 in) | 288 cm (113 in) | 280 cm (110 in) | ASP Apollon Patras |
| 3 | OH | Paraskevi Zafeiriou | 8 July 2006 (aged 16) | 1.79 m (5 ft 10 in) | 281 cm (111 in) | 271 cm (107 in) | APS Navarchos Votsis |
| 5 | L | Eleni Papadopoulou | 17 February 2004 (aged 18) | 1.62 m (5 ft 4 in) | 249 cm (98 in) | 256 cm (101 in) | PAOK |
| 6 | L | Aikaterini Kampouri | 14 September 2004 (aged 17) | 1.72 m (5 ft 8 in) | 254 cm (100 in) | 268 cm (106 in) | Aris |
| 7 | S | Alexandra Merodoulaki | 22 February 2005 (aged 17) | 1.83 m (6 ft 0 in) | 272 cm (107 in) | 283 cm (111 in) | PAOK |
| 8 | MB | Errika-Pelagia Gravari | 4 November 2006 (aged 15) | 1.86 m (6 ft 1 in) | 256 cm (101 in) | 277 cm (109 in) | AO Markopoulo |
| 11 | OP | Aikaterini Korre | 21 July 2006 (aged 16) | 1.93 m (6 ft 4 in) | 305 cm (120 in) | 290 cm (110 in) | AON Amazones |
| 12 | OH | Vasiliki Evangeliou | 9 December 2005 (aged 16) | 1.78 m (5 ft 10 in) | 262 cm (103 in) | 275 cm (108 in) | AO Markopoulo |
| 14 | MB | Angeliki Syristatidi | 21 February 2004 (aged 18) | 1.84 m (6 ft 0 in) | 289 cm (114 in) | 283 cm (111 in) | Olympiacos SFP |
| 15 | OH | Spyridoula Komini | 23 February 2005 (aged 17) | 1.78 m (5 ft 10 in) | 265 cm (104 in) | 278 cm (109 in) | SFAM Foivos Melission |
| 17 | MB | Aikaterini Allagianni | 15 June 2004 (aged 18) | 1.87 m (6 ft 2 in) | 270 cm (110 in) | 282 cm (111 in) | AO Markopoulo |
| 18 | OH | Argyro Dimitrakakou | 7 July 2005 (aged 17) | 1.77 m (5 ft 10 in) | 262 cm (103 in) | 274 cm (108 in) | AO Ionikos Nikaias |
| 20 | OH | Georgia Angelopoulou | 11 February 2005 (aged 17) | 1.79 m (5 ft 10 in) | 275 cm (108 in) | 284 cm (112 in) | ASP Apollon Patras |

=== Finland ===
The following is the Finland roster in the 2022 Women's U19 Volleyball European Championship.

Head coach: Nikolas Buser

| No. | Pos. | Name | Date of birth | Height | Spike | Block | Club |
|---|---|---|---|---|---|---|---|
| 1 | L | Veera Help | 5 February 2005 (aged 17) | 1.66 m (5 ft 5 in) | 267 cm (105 in) | 261 cm (103 in) | Puijo Wolley |
| 2 | OH | Oona Rasinperä | 15 January 2004 (aged 18) | 1.72 m (5 ft 8 in) | 285 cm (112 in) | 278 cm (109 in) | Pölkky Kuusamo |
| 6 | S | Moona Tarkiainen | 1 June 2004 (aged 18) | 1.78 m (5 ft 10 in) | 279 cm (110 in) | 270 cm (110 in) | Puijo Wolley |
| 8 | OH | Iida Pöllänen | 12 March 2005 (aged 17) | 1.80 m (5 ft 11 in) | 293 cm (115 in) | 283 cm (111 in) | LP Kangasala |
| 9 | MB | Ella Peltomaa | 20 May 2005 (aged 17) | 1.86 m (6 ft 1 in) | 310 cm (120 in) | 299 cm (118 in) | Hämeenlinnan LPK |
| 10 | S | Joanna Kallinen (c) | 15 February 2004 (aged 18) | 1.72 m (5 ft 8 in) | 281 cm (111 in) | 274 cm (108 in) | Pölkky Kuusamo |
| 11 | MB | Miia-Maria Mäkikyrö | 16 January 2005 (aged 17) | 1.84 m (6 ft 0 in) | 285 cm (112 in) | 282 cm (111 in) | WoVo |
| 12 | MB | Venla Kujala | 5 May 2004 (aged 18) | 1.77 m (5 ft 10 in) | 288 cm (113 in) | 273 cm (107 in) | Vaasan Kiisto |
| 14 | OP | Neea-Maria Joki | 14 August 2004 (aged 18) | 1.79 m (5 ft 10 in) | 291 cm (115 in) | 285 cm (112 in) | LP Kangasala |
| 15 | L | Juulia Jäppinen | 30 July 2004 (aged 18) | 1.65 m (5 ft 5 in) | 267 cm (105 in) | 260 cm (100 in) | Pölkky Kuusamo |
| 16 | OH | Heini Ahtola | 22 March 2004 (aged 18) | 1.84 m (6 ft 0 in) | 300 cm (120 in) | 285 cm (112 in) | LP-Vampula |
| 17 | MB | Hanna Kastarinen | 12 January 2006 (aged 16) | 1.86 m (6 ft 1 in) | 301 cm (119 in) | 286 cm (113 in) | Kuortane Puijo |
| 22 | S | Tiia Heikkinen | 4 January 2004 (aged 18) | 1.67 m (5 ft 6 in) | 280 cm (110 in) | 265 cm (104 in) | Vaasan Kiisto |
| 25 | OP | Selma Räsänen | 9 January 2004 (aged 18) | 1.78 m (5 ft 10 in) | 290 cm (110 in) | 281 cm (111 in) | LP-Vampula |

== Pool II ==
=== Turkey ===
The following is the Turkey roster in the 2022 Women's U19 Volleyball European Championship.

Head coach: Reşat Yazıcıoğulları

| No. | Pos. | Name | Date of birth | Height | Spike | Block | Club |
|---|---|---|---|---|---|---|---|
| 1 | L | Yasemin Narlıoğlu | 2 September 2004 (aged 17) | 1.76 m (5 ft 9 in) | 275 cm (108 in) | 262 cm (103 in) | |
| 2 | S | Selen Naz Kıran | 12 July 2004 (aged 18) | 1.80 m (5 ft 11 in) | 279 cm (110 in) | 270 cm (110 in) | |
| 3 | MB | Hatice Secem Ege | 25 October 2004 (aged 17) | 1.85 m (6 ft 1 in) | 294 cm (116 in) | 280 cm (110 in) | |
| 4 | OP | Beren Yeşilırmak | 1 June 2005 (aged 17) | 1.84 m (6 ft 0 in) | 290 cm (110 in) | 272 cm (107 in) | |
| 5 | OH | Ege Melisa Bükmen | 24 February 2004 (aged 18) | 1.81 m (5 ft 11 in) | 296 cm (117 in) | 279 cm (110 in) | |
| 6 | MB | Berka Buse Özden | 16 April 2004 (aged 18) | 1.82 m (6 ft 0 in) | 298 cm (117 in) | 282 cm (111 in) | |
| 10 | S | Dilay Özdemir | 25 August 2005 (aged 17) | 1.86 m (6 ft 1 in) | 295 cm (116 in) | 283 cm (111 in) | |
| 11 | OH | Bianka İlayda Mumcular | 18 June 2006 (aged 16) | 1.88 m (6 ft 2 in) | 296 cm (117 in) | 276 cm (109 in) | |
| 13 | OH | Tuana Mallı | 6 October 2005 (aged 16) | 1.75 m (5 ft 9 in) | 282 cm (111 in) | 271 cm (107 in) | |
| 14 | OP | Pelin Eroktay (c) | 14 November 2004 (aged 17) | 1.86 m (6 ft 1 in) | 292 cm (115 in) | 271 cm (107 in) | |
| 15 | OH | Fatma İklimya Demir | 24 May 2004 (aged 18) | 1.82 m (6 ft 0 in) | 290 cm (110 in) | 274 cm (108 in) | |
| 16 | MB | Bengisu Aygün | 25 November 2004 (aged 17) | 1.87 m (6 ft 2 in) | 299 cm (118 in) | 288 cm (113 in) | |
| 17 | OH | Eylül Durgun | 4 February 2005 (aged 17) | 1.85 m (6 ft 1 in) | 290 cm (110 in) | 280 cm (110 in) | |
| 18 | L | Berre İnce | 12 February 2004 (aged 18) | 1.61 m (5 ft 3 in) | 258 cm (102 in) | 250 cm (98 in) | |

=== Serbia ===
The following is the Serbia roster in the 2022 Women's U19 Volleyball European Championship.

Head coach: Vladimir Vasović

| No. | Pos. | Name | Date of birth | Height | Spike | Block | Club |
|---|---|---|---|---|---|---|---|
| 1 | S | Elena Baić | 31 August 2005 (aged 16) | 1.80 m (5 ft 11 in) | 275 cm (108 in) | 258 cm (102 in) | Spartak Subotica |
| 2 | S | Nina Mandović (c) | 29 October 2004 (aged 17) | 1.88 m (6 ft 2 in) | 302 cm (119 in) | 290 cm (110 in) | Tent Obrenovac |
| 4 | MB | Iva Šućurović | 28 July 2004 (aged 18) | 1.90 m (6 ft 3 in) | 295 cm (116 in) | 283 cm (111 in) | Omladinac Novi Banovci |
| 6 | MB | Hena Kurtagić | 27 August 2004 (aged 18) | 1.95 m (6 ft 5 in) | 310 cm (120 in) | 307 cm (121 in) | Tent Obrenovac |
| 7 | OP | Jovana Zelenović | 13 June 2004 (aged 18) | 2.00 m (6 ft 7 in) | 312 cm (123 in) | 303 cm (119 in) | Jedinstvo Stara Pazova |
| 8 | L | Stefana Pakić | 28 April 2004 (aged 18) | 1.77 m (5 ft 10 in) | 283 cm (111 in) | 275 cm (108 in) | Tent Obrenovac |
| 9 | OH | Ksenija Tomić | 10 March 2004 (aged 18) | 1.88 m (6 ft 2 in) | 304 cm (120 in) | 292 cm (115 in) | Partizan |
| 11 | OP | Anja Zubić | 21 August 2004 (aged 18) | 1.86 m (6 ft 1 in) | 300 cm (120 in) | 286 cm (113 in) | Partizan |
| 13 | OH | Bojana Popović | 21 April 2004 (aged 18) | 1.83 m (6 ft 0 in) | 305 cm (120 in) | 290 cm (110 in) | Tent Obrenovac |
| 14 | OH | Aleksandra Uzelac | 27 July 2004 (aged 18) | 1.88 m (6 ft 2 in) | 305 cm (120 in) | 295 cm (116 in) | Železničar Lajkovac |
| 15 | L | Dina Župić | 27 July 2004 (aged 18) | 1.75 m (5 ft 9 in) | 265 cm (104 in) | 250 cm (98 in) | Novi Pazar |
| 17 | OH | Una Vajagić | 2 July 2004 (aged 18) | 1.81 m (5 ft 11 in) | 293 cm (115 in) | 278 cm (109 in) | Omladinac Novi Banovci |
| 24 | OP | Anastasija Ivković | 3 February 2005 (aged 17) | 1.85 m (6 ft 1 in) | 290 cm (110 in) | 285 cm (112 in) | Sterija Beograd |
| 25 | MB | Maša Kirov | 16 August 2005 (aged 17) | 1.89 m (6 ft 2 in) | 295 cm (116 in) | 285 cm (112 in) | Beograd |

=== Croatia ===
The following is the Croatia roster in the 2022 Women's U19 Volleyball European Championship.

Head coach: Saša Ivanišević

| No. | Pos. | Name | Date of birth | Height | Spike | Block | Club |
|---|---|---|---|---|---|---|---|
| 1 | L | Tia Kovčo | 31 October 2005 (aged 16) | 1.68 m (5 ft 6 in) | 268 cm (106 in) | 242 cm (95 in) | |
| 2 | L | Ana Petriško | 8 January 2004 (aged 18) | 1.66 m (5 ft 5 in) | 264 cm (104 in) | 242 cm (95 in) | |
| 3 | MB | Bianka Lulić | 19 June 2005 (aged 17) | 1.92 m (6 ft 4 in) | 294 cm (116 in) | 266 cm (105 in) | |
| 4 | OH | Taisa Weinand | 29 June 2004 (aged 18) | 1.77 m (5 ft 10 in) | 288 cm (113 in) | 261 cm (103 in) | |
| 6 | OH | Ena Zajec (c) | 3 January 2004 (aged 18) | 1.77 m (5 ft 10 in) | 288 cm (113 in) | 261 cm (103 in) | |
| 7 | S | Petra Brkičić | 23 June 2005 (aged 17) | 1.81 m (5 ft 11 in) | 290 cm (110 in) | 274 cm (108 in) | |
| 8 | MB | Ivana Čubelić | 27 April 2004 (aged 18) | 1.79 m (5 ft 10 in) | 284 cm (112 in) | 258 cm (102 in) | |
| 9 | MB | Viktoria Ana Trcol | 18 September 2004 (aged 17) | 1.86 m (6 ft 1 in) | 290 cm (110 in) | 260 cm (100 in) | |
| 10 | OP | Marija Tabak | 7 February 2005 (aged 17) | 1.80 m (5 ft 11 in) | 288 cm (113 in) | 258 cm (102 in) | |
| 11 | OH | Ana Burilović | 17 February 2005 (aged 17) | 1.82 m (6 ft 0 in) | 291 cm (115 in) | 264 cm (104 in) | |
| 12 | OH | Mara Štiglić | 21 November 2005 (aged 16) | 1.84 m (6 ft 0 in) | 293 cm (115 in) | 268 cm (106 in) | |
| 13 | S | Kate Lijić | 19 April 2005 (aged 17) | 1.80 m (5 ft 11 in) | 280 cm (110 in) | 253 cm (100 in) | |
| 14 | OH | Lara Škoro | 9 December 2005 (aged 16) | 1.80 m (5 ft 11 in) | 284 cm (112 in) | 262 cm (103 in) | |
| 15 | MB | Aurora Papac | 27 April 2005 (aged 17) | 1.91 m (6 ft 3 in) | 294 cm (116 in) | 264 cm (104 in) | |

=== Romania ===
The following is the Romania roster in the 2022 Women's U19 Volleyball European Championship.

Head coach: Marius Macarie

| No. | Pos. | Name | Date of birth | Height | Spike | Block | Club |
|---|---|---|---|---|---|---|---|
| 1 | L | Eva Vizitiu | 14 November 2007 (aged 14) | 1.64 m (5 ft 5 in) | 253 cm (100 in) | 242 cm (95 in) | |
| 2 | OH | Gabriela Dumitru | 6 February 2004 (aged 18) | 1.75 m (5 ft 9 in) | 285 cm (112 in) | 273 cm (107 in) | |
| 4 | OH | Antonia Gheți | 25 February 2006 (aged 16) | 1.77 m (5 ft 10 in) | 275 cm (108 in) | 260 cm (100 in) | |
| 5 | MB | Tara Cristea | 29 October 2004 (aged 17) | 1.85 m (6 ft 1 in) | 300 cm (120 in) | 290 cm (110 in) | |
| 7 | S | Maria Nemeș | 14 July 2005 (aged 17) | 1.84 m (6 ft 0 in) | 293 cm (115 in) | 280 cm (110 in) | |
| 8 | MB | Bianca Grama | 23 May 2005 (aged 17) | 1.93 m (6 ft 4 in) | 302 cm (119 in) | 290 cm (110 in) | |
| 9 | S | Iarina Axinte (c) | 16 June 2005 (aged 17) | 1.79 m (5 ft 10 in) | 282 cm (111 in) | 273 cm (107 in) | |
| 11 | MB | Andra Badiu-Savu | 11 August 2004 (aged 18) | 1.86 m (6 ft 1 in) | 295 cm (116 in) | 280 cm (110 in) | |
| 13 | OP | Carla Pîrv | 11 March 2007 (aged 15) | 1.77 m (5 ft 10 in) | 274 cm (108 in) | 265 cm (104 in) | |
| 16 | OH | Beatrice Iliescu | 2 June 2006 (aged 16) | 1.77 m (5 ft 10 in) | 283 cm (111 in) | 271 cm (107 in) | |
| 17 | MB | Dalia Vîrlan | 18 February 2005 (aged 17) | 1.93 m (6 ft 4 in) | 311 cm (122 in) | 298 cm (117 in) | |
| 18 | L | Alexandra Ion | 25 August 2004 (aged 18) | 1.59 m (5 ft 3 in) | 255 cm (100 in) | 239 cm (94 in) | |
| 19 | OP | Denisa Ștefania Cheluță | 6 April 2004 (aged 18) | 1.94 m (6 ft 4 in) | 306 cm (120 in) | 290 cm (110 in) | |
| 22 | OH | Teodora Iancu | 10 April 2004 (aged 18) | 1.82 m (6 ft 0 in) | 300 cm (120 in) | 285 cm (112 in) | |

=== Switzerland ===
The following is the Switzerland roster in the 2022 Women's U19 Volleyball European Championship.

Head coach: Frieder Strohm

| No. | Pos. | Name | Date of birth | Height | Spike | Block | Club |
|---|---|---|---|---|---|---|---|
| 4 | S | Julie Monge | 29 February 2004 (aged 18) | 1.73 m (5 ft 8 in) | 274 cm (108 in) | 265 cm (104 in) | |
| 5 | OH | Jael Heim | 21 July 2005 (aged 17) | 1.82 m (6 ft 0 in) | 288 cm (113 in) | 264 cm (104 in) | |
| 6 | L | Caroline Delley | 21 July 2005 (aged 17) | 1.68 m (5 ft 6 in) | 276 cm (109 in) | 259 cm (102 in) | |
| 7 | OH | Shana Hägele | 5 September 2004 (aged 17) | 1.84 m (6 ft 0 in) | 298 cm (117 in) | 290 cm (110 in) | |
| 9 | MB | Sheyla Bögli | 26 July 2005 (aged 17) | 1.82 m (6 ft 0 in) | 298 cm (117 in) | 288 cm (113 in) | |
| 10 | OH | Sindi Mico | 21 April 2004 (aged 18) | 1.84 m (6 ft 0 in) | 302 cm (119 in) | 292 cm (115 in) | |
| 11 | OH | Alina Stäuble | 4 April 2005 (aged 17) | 1.80 m (5 ft 11 in) | 303 cm (119 in) | 293 cm (115 in) | |
| 12 | S | Mia Lüthi | 21 September 2004 (aged 17) | 1.75 m (5 ft 9 in) | 299 cm (118 in) | 265 cm (104 in) | |
| 13 | MB | Magdalena Kneubühler | 18 August 2004 (aged 18) | 1.89 m (6 ft 2 in) | 300 cm (120 in) | 290 cm (110 in) | |
| 15 | OH | Svenja Wenger | 17 January 2005 (aged 17) | 1.73 m (5 ft 8 in) | 286 cm (113 in) | 262 cm (103 in) | |
| 17 | L | Milena Zoller | 12 June 2004 (aged 18) | 1.63 m (5 ft 4 in) | 274 cm (108 in) | 251 cm (99 in) | |
| 18 | MB | Melissa Stewart | 21 October 2004 (aged 17) | 1.82 m (6 ft 0 in) | 302 cm (119 in) | 275 cm (108 in) | |
| 19 | OH | Amélie Lengweiler | 24 February 2004 (aged 18) | 1.80 m (5 ft 11 in) | 302 cm (119 in) | 285 cm (112 in) | |
| 21 | OH | Noelle Schenker (c) | 8 June 2004 (aged 18) | 1.83 m (6 ft 0 in) | 298 cm (117 in) | 282 cm (111 in) | |

=== Netherlands ===
The following is the Netherlands roster in the 2022 Women's U19 Volleyball European Championship.

Head coach: Eric Meijer

| No. | Pos. | Name | Date of birth | Height | Spike | Block | Club |
|---|---|---|---|---|---|---|---|
| 1 | L | Pippa Molenaar | 31 May 2005 (aged 17) | 1.71 m (5 ft 7 in) | 271 cm (107 in) | 258 cm (102 in) | |
| 2 | S | Sanne Konijnenberg | 30 August 2004 (aged 17) | 1.80 m (5 ft 11 in) | 291 cm (115 in) | 286 cm (113 in) | |
| 3 | OH | Noa de Vos (c) | 24 April 2004 (aged 18) | 1.88 m (6 ft 2 in) | 308 cm (121 in) | 297 cm (117 in) | |
| 5 | MB | Suus Gerritsen | 7 October 2005 (aged 16) | 1.85 m (6 ft 1 in) | 295 cm (116 in) | 290 cm (110 in) | |
| 6 | MB | Marije ten Brinke | 19 April 2004 (aged 18) | 1.87 m (6 ft 2 in) | 303 cm (119 in) | 295 cm (116 in) | |
| 7 | OP | Aysha Meering | 28 March 2007 (aged 15) | 1.80 m (5 ft 11 in) | 280 cm (110 in) | 280 cm (110 in) | |
| 9 | OH | Dagmar Mourits | 13 March 2004 (aged 18) | 1.87 m (6 ft 2 in) | 304 cm (120 in) | 297 cm (117 in) | |
| 10 | OH | Jet Kok | 17 July 2004 (aged 18) | 1.80 m (5 ft 11 in) | 200 cm (79 in) | 200 cm (79 in) | |
| 11 | MB | Emily Silderhuis | 19 January 2004 (aged 18) | 1.93 m (6 ft 4 in) | 306 cm (120 in) | 295 cm (116 in) | |
| 12 | OH | Tess Leemreize | 24 June 2004 (aged 18) | 1.77 m (5 ft 10 in) | 290 cm (110 in) | 279 cm (110 in) | |
| 13 | L | Veerle Buchwald | 20 February 2005 (aged 17) | 1.70 m (5 ft 7 in) | 280 cm (110 in) | 275 cm (108 in) | |
| 14 | OH | Nicole van de Vosse | 16 June 2004 (aged 18) | 1.84 m (6 ft 0 in) | 299 cm (118 in) | 291 cm (115 in) | |
| 15 | S | Carlijn Radstake | 26 July 2005 (aged 17) | 1.75 m (5 ft 9 in) | 230 cm (91 in) | 280 cm (110 in) | |
| 22 | MB | Sanne Wagener | 17 January 2004 (aged 18) | 1.89 m (6 ft 2 in) | 296 cm (117 in) | 292 cm (115 in) | |
