= Slovenia women's national under-21 volleyball team =

National under-20 women's volleyball team of Slovenia

Slovenia U20
- Association: Volleyball Federation of Slovenia
- Confederation: CEV

Uniforms
Home	Away	Third

FIVB U21 World Championship
- Appearances: No Appearances

Europe U19 Championship
- Appearances: 4 (First in 2010)
- Best result: Runners-up : (2014)
- Official website

The Slovenia women's national under-20 volleyball team represents Slovenia in international women's volleyball competitions under the age of 20 and is controlled by the Volleyball Federation of Slovenia, which is an affiliate of the Federation of International Volleyball (FIVB) and also a part of the European Volleyball Confederation (CEV).

== Results ==
=== FIVB U21 World Championship ===
Champions Runners up Third place Fourth place

FIVB U21 World Championship
Year	Round	Position	Pld	W	L	SW	SL	Squad
(Brazil) → 1977	See Yugoslavia							
(Brazil) ← 1993	See Yugoslavia							
(Thailand) → 1995	Didn't qualify							
(Belgium) (Netherlands) ← 2021	Didn't qualify							
Total	0 Titles	0/21						

=== Europe Junior Championship ===
Champions Runners up Third place Fourth place

Europe Junior Championship
Year	Round	Position	Pld	W	L	SW	SL	Squad
(Hungary) → 1966	See Yugoslavia							
(Greece) ← 1992	See Yugoslavia							
(Hungary) → 1994	Didn't qualify							
(Italy) ← 2008	Didn't qualify							
(Serbia) 2010		8th place						Squad
(Turkey) 2012		7th place						Squad
(Finland) / (Estonia) 2014		Runners-up						Squad
(Hungary) / (Slovakia) → 2016	Didn't qualify							
(Croatia) (Bosnia and Herzegovina) ← 2020	Didn't qualify							
(North Macedonia) 2022		7th place						Squad
Total	0 title	4/28						

== Team ==
=== Current squad ===
The Following players is the Slovenian players that Competed in the 2018 Women's U19 Volleyball European Championship

#	name	position	height	weight	birthday	spike	block
2	pogacar eva	setter	184	64	2000	280	264
5	zatkovic eva	opposite	191	80	2001	290	273
6	jerala alja	outside-spiker	180	67	2000	279	266
7	bavdaž nika	opposite	181	70	2000	274	259
8	bracko brina	middle-blocker	177	70	2000	277	261
9	kukman naja	opposite	180	61	2000	279	262
10	šcuka ajda	libero	176	65	2000	266	254
11	cigale nika	middle-blocker	178	79	2000	281	263
12	trlep nuša	outside-spiker	176	66	2000	277	259
13	pavic karin	middle-blocker	178	65	2000	277	260
14	lekše tali	outside-spiker	180	67	2000	279	266
15	mazej anja	libero	170	56	2000	259	250
17	krajnc ana mojca	middle-blocker	181	72	2000	279	262
18	jerala manja	middle-blocker	185	70	2002	299	274
19	mageš pija	setter	166	55	2001	257	245
19	metelko naja	setter	175	63	2001	279	267
20	zorman anja	middle-blocker	181	72	2001	282	262
