= Pelin Aroğuz =

Turkish volleyball player (born 1997)

Personal information
- Born: May 8, 1997 (age 29)
- Height: 1.86 m (6 ft 1 in)
- Weight: 74 kg (163 lb)
- Spike: 281 cm (111 in)
- Block: 272 cm (107 in)

Volleyball information
- Position: Wing spiker
- Current club: Vakıfbank SK
- Number: 9

National team
- 2012–2013
- 2014–
- Turkey girls' youth
- Turkey women's junior
Honours
Women's Volleyball
Representing Turkey
Women's Junior European Championship
Bronze medal – third place	2014 Tampere-Tartu	Team
Girls' Youth European Championship
Bronze medal – third place	2013 Bar	Team
Tournaments
Gold medal – first place	2013 Brussels	Team

Pelin Aroğuz (born May 8, 1997) is a Turkish female volleyball player. She is 186 cm (6 ft 1 in) at 74 kg (163 lb), and plays as wing spiker in both the youth and junior teams of Vakıfbank SK in Ankara. Aroğuz is a member of the Turkey girls' youth national volleyball team, and wears number 9. In 2014, she was called up to the Turkey women's junior national volleyball team.

She played in the girls' youth team of her primary school Bilfen Ataşehir İlköğretim, which won the district league at Ataşehir, Istanbul in the 2011-12 season.

In the 2012-13 season, she played in Vakıfbank's youth team, which won the Turkish PAV League (league for teams of candidate professional volleyball players) undefeated.

In January 2012, Aroğuz was admitted to the Turkey girls' youth national team. She debuted internationally at the International Brussels Tournament in February 2013, at which she claimed her first national gold medal, and was named "Most Valuable Player" of the tournament in Belgium.

Pelin Aroğuz won the bronze medal with the national team at the 2013 Girls' Youth European Volleyball Championship held in Serbia and Montenegro from March 30 to April 7, 2013. She was selected "Best Spiker" of the championship.

With the women's junior national team, she won the bronze medal at the 2014 Women's Junior European Volleyball Championship held in Finland and Estonia. She was selected "Best Spiker" of the championship.

== Awards ==
=== Individual ===
- 2013 International Brussels Tournament - Most Valuable Player
- 2013 Girls' Youth European Volleyball Championship - Best Spiker
- 2014 Women's Junior European Volleyball Championship - Best Spiker

=== National team ===
- 2013 International Brussels Tournament - Gold
- 2013 Girls' Youth European Volleyball Championship - Bronze
- 2014 Women's Junior European Volleyball Championship - Bronze

=== Club ===
- 2012-13 Turkish PAV League Gold with Vakıfbank Girls' Youth team

== See also ==
- Turkish women in sports
