= Marco Aurélio Motta =

Brazilian volleyball coach

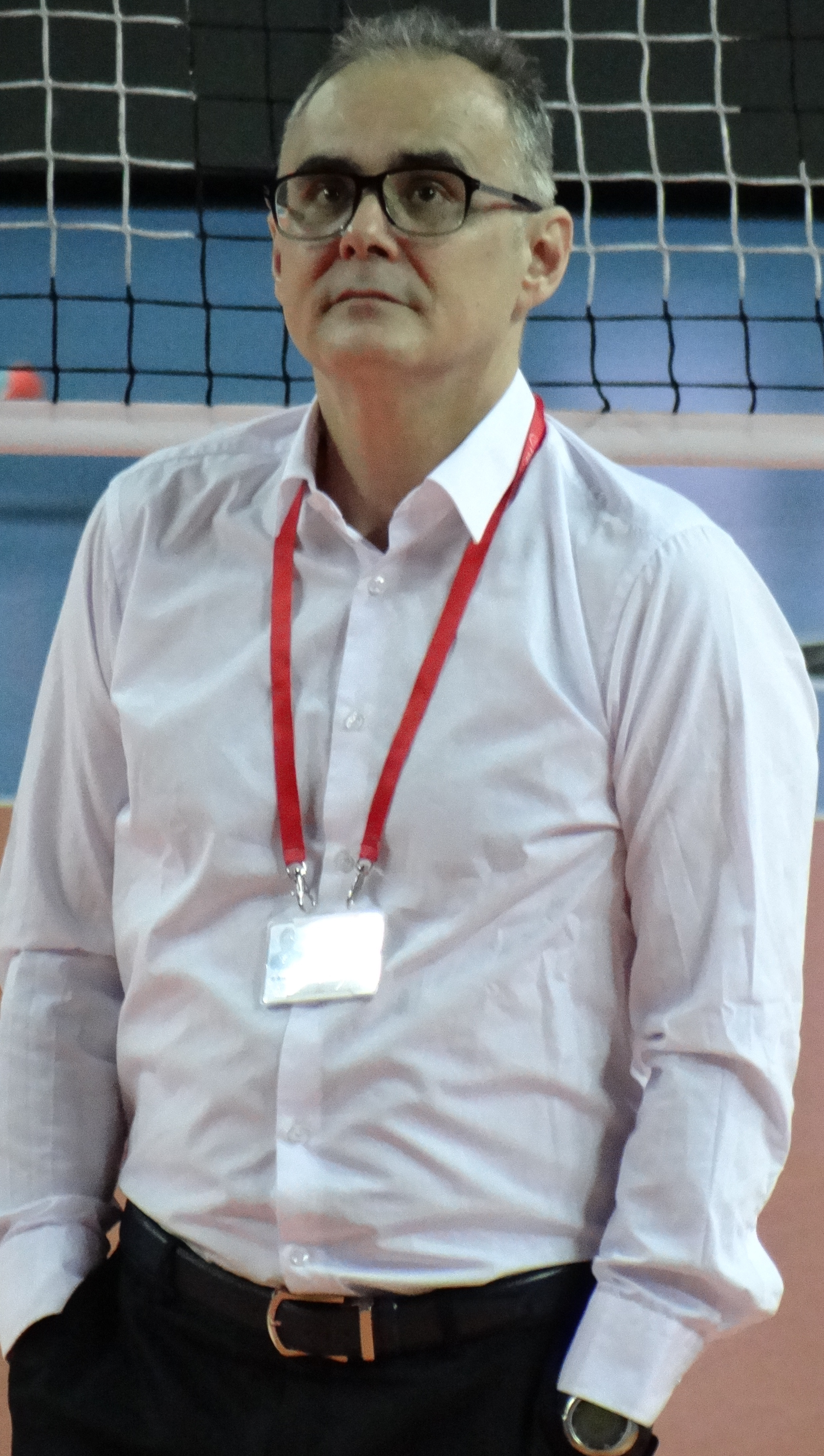

Personal information
- Born: 1960 (age 65–66); Rio de Janeiro, Brazil

Volleyball information
- Position: Head coach

Career
Years
- 1984-85
- 1985-87
- 1987-88
- 1991-96
- 2001-03
- 2004-07
- 2011-13
Teams
- (Brazil) Bradesco SC
- Brazil junior women's
- (Brazil) Lutkin SC
- Italy junior women's
- Brazil women's
- (Turkey) Eczacıbaşı VitrA
- Turkey women's
- Last updated: September 7, 2013

Marco Aurélio Motta (born 1960 in Rio de Janeiro, Brazil) is a volleyball coach from Brazil. He was the head coach of the Turkey women's national team from 2011 to 2013.

He began with volleyball playing at the age of 14. He pursued a career as a coach for beach volleyball as he was 17. During that time, he discovered and coached talented beach volleyball players such as Ana Richa and Adriana Samuel.

He graduated from the Sports Academy, and helped his club Bradesco became 1984 Brazilian champion with eight young members. Discovering volleyballers like Ana Moser, Fernanda Venturini, Denise, Ana Richa, Ana Flavia, Marcia Fu, Simone Storm and Tina, he made the Brazil junior women's national volleyball team world's fourth in 1985, and two years later world champion. Motta transferred in 1987 to Lutkin Sports Club, and made his new club Brazilian champion.

Between 1991 and 1996, he coached Italy's junior women's national team. He is considered as the main architect of the team's development. During that time, his team was twice European champion, defeating the Russian junior women's national team, which was a 13-time European champion until then.

In 1997, Motta returned home, accepting an offer of the Brazilian Volleyball Confederation and led until 2000 a promotional programme for 30,000 children called "Viva Volei". During this time, he coached the beach volleyball double Adriana Samuel and Sandra Pires.

Motta coached the Brazil women's national volleyball team between 2001 and 2003.

In 2004, he transferred to the Turkish club Eczacıbaşı VitrA for three seasons. With him, the club won two league championships after a third place in his first season.

He served as the director of the Center for Physical Education and Sports at the Universidade Santa Úrsula in Rio de Janeiro.

At the end of 2010, he was named head coach of the Turkey women's national team. Motta led the Turkish team to bronze medals at the 2011 Women's European Volleyball Championship and the 2012 FIVB World Grand Prix and in 2012 the Turkish women's team qualified for the first time for the Olympics.

== National teams ==
- Brazil junior women's national team (1985–87) Head Coach
- Italy junior women's national team (1991–96) Head Coach
- Brazil women's national team (2001–03) Head Coach
- Turkey women's national team (2011–13) Head Coach

== Clubs ==
| Club | Country | From | To |
|---|---|---|---|
| Bradesco SC | Brazil | 1984 | 1985 |
| Lutkin SC | Brazil | 1987 | 1988 |
| Eczacıbaşı VitrA | Turkey | 2004 | 2007 |

== Achievements ==
Motta's achievements include:

- Brazil Women's champion, twice
- Brazil Girl's champion
- South American Clubs champion

Brazil women's national volleyball team

- South America champion
- South America champion (Brazil junior women's national team)
- South America champion (Brazil girl's national team)
- 1987 World champion (Brazil junior women's national team)

Eczacıbaşı VitrA

- 2004-05 Turkish League - Bronze
- 2005 Top Teams Championships - Bronze
- 2005-06 Turkish League - Gold
- 2006-07 Turkish League - Gold

Turkey women's national volleyball team

- 2011 Women's European Volleyball Championship - Bronze
- 2012 FIVB World Grand Prix - Bronze
