= Sweden women's national under-21 volleyball team =

Youth volleyball team representing Sweden

Sweden U20
- Association: Swedish Volleyball Federation
- Confederation: CEV

Uniforms
Home	Away	Third

FIVB U21 World Championship
- Appearances: No Appearances

Europe U19 Championship
- Appearances: 2 (First in 1973)
- Best result: 12th place : (1984)
- www.volleyboll.se (in Swedish)

The Sweden women's national under-20 volleyball team represents Sweden in international women's volleyball competitions and friendly matches under the age 20 and it is ruled by the Swedish Volleyball Federation that is an affiliate of Federation of International Volleyball FIVB and also a part of European Volleyball Confederation CEV.

== Results ==
=== FIVB U21 World Championship ===
Champions Runners up Third place Fourth place

FIVB U21 World Championship
Year	Round	Position	Pld	W	L	SW	SL	Squad
(Brazil) → 1977	Didn't qualify							
(Belgium) (Netherlands) ← 2021	Didn't qualify							
Total	0 Titles	0/21						

=== Europe Junior Championship ===
Champions Runners up Third place Fourth place

Europe Junior Championship
Year	Round	Position	Pld	W	L	SW	SL	Squad
(Hungary) → 1966	Didn't qualify							
(Italy) ← 1971	Didn't qualify							
(Netherlands) 1973		16th place						Squad
(West Germany) → 1975	Didn't qualify							
(West Germany) ← 1982	Didn't qualify							
(France) 1984		12th place						Squad
(Bulgaria) → 1986	Didn't qualify							
(North Macedonia) ← 2022	Didn't qualify							
Total	0 Titles	2/27						

== Team ==
=== Current squad ===
The Following players is the Swedish players that Competed in the 2018 Women's U19 Volleyball European Championship

#	name	position	height	weight	birthday	spike	block
	abrahamsson sandra	opposite	182	68	2000	290	284
	andersson sofia	setter	181	83	2000	292	285
	areskoug tyra	setter	173	67	2001	281	270
	brink filippa	libero	166	56	2001	271	265
	broberg hedda	middle-blocker	184	66	2001	287	279
	calmfors wilma	outside-spiker	182	68	2000	290	280
	cooper catarina	libero	168	69	2000	283	272
	evans esther magda	outside-spiker	176	68	2000	302	295
	granberg evelina	outside-spiker	181	85	2000	290	285
	hellvig hanna	outside-spiker	188	69	2000	314	301
	juneholm klara	middle-blocker	181	64	2001	293	285
	klarin ekholm matilda	outside-spiker	179	68	2000	290	275
	lindberg paulina	middle-blocker	191	78	2002	297	280
	reffel isabelle	outside-spiker	183	59	2001	295	280
	sandberg ella	setter	171	54	2000	276	265
	skogsfors fanny	middle-blocker	190	87	2000	300	290
	thun tilde	middle-blocker	182	68	2000	305	295
