= Gerli (name) =

Female given name

- Gender: Female
- Language: Estonian

Origin
- Region of origin: Estonia

Other names
- Related names: Gerly, Kerli, Kerly

Gerli is an Estonian feminine given name and may refer to:

- Gerli Israel (born 1995), footballer
- Gerli Liinamäe (born 1995), figure skater
- Gerli Padar (born 1979), singer

== See also ==
- Gerli, town in Argentina
