= Ana Lima (volleyball) =

Brazilian volleyball player (born 1969)

Ana Paula Lessa Lima

Personal information
- Full name: Ana Paula Lessa Lima
- Nickname: Popó
- Born: 24 April 1969 (age 57); Maceió, Alagoas, Brazil
- Height: 1.85 m (6 ft 1 in)
- Weight: 63 kg (139 lb)
- Spike: 297 cm (117 in)
- Block: 278 cm (109 in)

Volleyball information
- Position: Middle blocker

National team
Brazil
Honours
Women's volleyball
Representing Brazil
World Grand Champions Cup
Bronze medal – third place	1997 Japan
World Grand Prix
Gold medal – first place	1994 Shanghai	Team
South American Championship
Gold medal – first place	1997 Lima
Silver medal – second place	1993 Cuzco

Ana Lima (born 24 April 1969) is a retired Brazilian female volleyball player. She was part of the Brazil women's national volleyball team.

She participated in the 1994 FIVB Volleyball Women's World Championship. On club level she played with Colgate/Sao Caetano.

== Clubs ==
- Colgate/Sao Caetano (1994)
