= Greece women's national under-19 volleyball team =

Greece U19
- Association: Hellenic Volleyball Federation
- Confederation: CEV

Uniforms
Home	Away	Third

FIVB U19 World Championship
- Appearances: 1 (First in 2013)
- Best result: 12th place : (2013)

Europe U18 / U17 Championship
- Appearances: 5 (First in 2009)
- Best result: 5th place : (2013)
- Official website

The Greece women's national under-19 volleyball team represents Greece in international women's volleyball competitions and friendly matches under the age 19 and it is ruled and managed by the Hellenic Volleyball Federation That is an affiliate of Federation of International Volleyball FIVB and also a part of European Volleyball Confederation CEV.

== Results ==
=== Summer Youth Olympics ===
Champions Runners up Third place Fourth place

Youth Olympic Games
Year	Round	Position	Pld	W	L	SW	SL	Squad
(Singapore) 2010	Didn't qualify							
(China) 2014	No Volleyball Event							
(Argentina) 2018	No Volleyball Event							
Total	0 Titles	0/1						

=== FIVB U19 World Championship ===
Champions Runners up Third place Fourth place

FIVB U19 World Championship
Year	Round	Position	Pld	W	L	SW	SL	Squad
(Brazil) 1989 →	Didn't qualify							
(Turkey) 2011 ←	Didn't qualify							
(Thailand) 2013		12th place						Squad
(Peru) 2015 →	Didn't qualify							
(Mexico) 2021 ←	Didn't qualify							
Total	0 Titles	1/17						

=== Europe Girls' Youth Championship ===
Champions Runners up Third place Fourth place

Europe Girls' Youth Championship
Year	Round	Position	Pld	W	L	SW	SL	Squad
(Spain) 1995 →	Didn't qualify							
(Czech Republic) 2007 ←	Didn't qualify							
(Netherlands) 2009		12th place						Squad
(Turkey) 2011		8th place						Squad
(Montenegro) / (Serbia) 2013		5th place						Squad
(Bulgaria) 2015		10th place						Squad
(Netherlands) 2017		12th place						Squad
(Bulgaria) 2018 →	Didn't qualify							
(Czech Republic) 2022 ←	Didn't qualify							
Total	0 Titles	5/15						

== Team ==
=== Current squad ===
The Following players is the Greek players that Competed in the 2018 Girls' U17 Volleyball European Championship

#	name	position	height	weight	birthday	spike	block
	anthouli martha evdokia	opposite	198	89	2004	296	286
	Antypa styliani	outside-spiker	176	62	2002	272	265
	Aplada niki	middle-blocker	183	63	2002	278	274
	Armoutsi tatiana	middle-blocker	184	73	2003	274	264
	Ballogianni konstantina	outside-spiker	180	68	2003	278	269
	Boki theodora	middle-blocker	184	62	2002	284	276
	Chatzigrigoriou nefeli	setter	181	63	2002	278	269
	Garofalaki evangelia	setter	174	67	2003	273	263
	Gkiourda styliani	outside-spiker	177	44	2002	274	268
	Kampylafka ioanna-anna	libero	167	60	2003	252	248
	Kontogiannoglou georgia-modesto	libero	160	52	2002	252	250
	Kostopoulou danai	outside-spiker	177	53	2002	272	264
	Koudouna danai	opposite	178	63	2002	272	270
	Kyparissi stamatia	outside-spiker	184	59	2002	289	283
	Merakli maria-nektaria	opposite	190	72	2003	286	278
	Pagomenou eleni	outside-spiker	178	64	2002	272	270
	Papadopoulou persefoni	outside-spiker	180	70	2002	278	276
	Papadopoulou victoria	outside-spiker	178	69	2002	272	262
	Petrinoli olga	libero	164	50	2002	254	248
	Plakia nikoleta	middle-blocker	182	55	2002	280	270
	Sidiropoulou maria	outside-spiker	178	60	2002	273	270
	Skempi aristea	middle-blocker	190	76	2002	285	274
	Souli nefeli efthymia	setter	183	61	2002	285	282
	Trilyraki agni	outside-spiker	178	60	2003	272	270
	Tsopanoglou martha	outside-spiker	175	53	2002	272	267
	Veneti alexandra	setter	182	65	2002	283	275
