= Swedish Volleyball Federation =

Volleyball governing body in Sweden

- Svenska Volleybollförbundet
- Formation: 3 June 1961
- Type: sports governing body
- Headquarters: Solna
- Location: Sweden

Swedish Volleyball Federation (Swedish: Svenska Volleybollförbundet) is a special sports association for volleyball in Sweden. It was established on 3 June 1961 and was appointed into the Swedish Sports Confederation in 1961. It is based in Solna.

It represents Sweden with national teams like the Sweden men's national volleyball team and the Sweden women's national volleyball team.
