= Switzerland women's national under-19 volleyball team =

Switzerland U19
- Association: Swiss Volleyball Federation
- Confederation: CEV

Uniforms
Home	Away	Third

FIVB U19 World Championship
- Appearances: No Appearances

Europe U18 / U17 Championship
- Appearances: No Appearances
- www.volleyball.ch/

The Switzerland women's national under-19 volleyball team represents Switzerland in international women's volleyball competitions and friendly matches under the age 19 and it is ruled and managed by the Swiss Volleyball Federation That is an affiliate of Federation of International Volleyball FIVB and also a part of European Volleyball Confederation CEV.

== Results ==
=== Summer Youth Olympics ===
Champions Runners up Third place Fourth place

Youth Olympic Games
Year	Round	Position	Pld	W	L	SW	SL	Squad
(Singapore) 2010	Didn't qualify							
(China) 2014	No Volleyball Event							
(Argentina) 2018	No Volleyball Event							
Total	0 Titles	0/1						

=== FIVB U19 World Championship ===
Champions Runners up Third place Fourth place

FIVB U19 World Championship
Year	Round	Position	Pld	W	L	SW	SL	Squad
(Brazil) → 1989	Didn't qualify							
(Mexico) ← 2021	Didn't qualify							
Total	0 Titles	0/17						

=== Europe Girls' Youth Championship ===
Champions Runners up Third place Fourth place

Europe Girls' Youth Championship
Year	Round	Position	Pld	W	L	SW	SL	Squad
(Spain) 1995	Didn't qualify							
(Slovakia) 1997	Didn't qualify							
(Poland) 1999	Didn't qualify							
(Czech Republic) 2001	Didn't qualify							
(Croatia) 2003	Didn't qualify							
(Estonia) 2005	Didn't qualify							
(Czech Republic) 2007	Didn't qualify							
(Netherlands) 2009	Didn't qualify							
(Turkey) 2011	Didn't qualify							
2013 Q	Didn't Enter							
2015 Q	Group Stages	Third Placed						Squad
2017 Q	Second Round	4th Placed						Squad
2018 Q	Group Stages	Third Placed						Squad
2020 Q	Didn't Enter							
2022 Q	Didn't Enter							
Total	0 Titles	0/15						

== Team ==
=== Current squad ===
The Following players is the Swiss players that Competed in the 2018 Girls' U17 Volleyball European Championship Qualifiacations

#	name	position	height	weight	birthday	spike	block
1	surikova anna	outside-spiker	176	56	2002	284	270
2	hofacher alina	opposite	178	58	2002	288	278
3	stähli annik	opposite	187	78	2002	294	282
4	kuch jasmin	outside-spiker	183	76	2002	294	284
5	ammirati chiara	outside-spiker	177	72	2002	290	275
6	capraro lia	outside-spiker	177	58	2002	288	280
7	toschini lea	opposite	180	67	2003	278	265
8	engel mathilde	libero	166	61	2002	270	255
9	giroud sandrine	libero	169	60	2002	276	264
11	nussbaumer michaela	middle-blocker	181	71	2002	284	274
12	holler néhémie	middle-blocker	179	65	2002	290	280
13	eichler tabea	middle-blocker	186	68	2003	298	288
14	moser anouk	middle-blocker	184	61	2003	282	275
15	maeder annalea	setter	186	61	2002	294	282
16	rohrer marcia	setter	177	68	2002	286	272
17	josipovic kristina	setter	176	66	2003	282	270
18	perret amelie	setter	171	67	2003	270	265
19	mottis fabiana	libero	164	50	2003	258	242
20	chappatte kimy	libero	167	56	2002	268	250
21	erni annouk	outside-spiker	178	63	2003	284	272
