= Kerly Santos =

Brazilian volleyball player (born 1970)

Personal information
- Full name: Kerly Cristiane Paiva dos Santos
- Born: 9 August 1970 (age 56); São Paulo, Brazil
- Height: 1.89 m (6 ft 2 in)

Volleyball information
- Position: Middle blocker
- Number: 1

National team
1988–1993	Brazil
Honours
Women's volleyball
Representing Brazil
Goodwill Games
Bronze medal – third place	1990 Seattle
Pan American Games
Silver medal – second place	1991 Havana	Team
CSV South American Championship
Gold medal – first place	1991 Osasco
Silver medal – second place	1989 Curitiba

Kerly Santos (born 9 August 1970) is a Brazilian former volleyball player. She competed in the women's tournament at the 1988 Summer Olympics in Seoul, South Korea.
