= 2014 Women's Junior European Volleyball Championship =

Tournament details
- Host country: Finland and Estonia
- Dates: August 16 – 24
- Teams: 12
- Venues: 2 (in Tampere and Tartu host cities)

Final positions
- Champions: Serbia (1st title)

Tournament awards
- MVP: Tijana Bošković (SRB)

The 2014 Women's Junior European Volleyball Championship was played in Finland and Estonia, in this cities Tampere and Tartu, from August 16 to 24, 2014.

== Participating teams ==
- Host
  - Finland
  - Estonia
- Qualified through 2014 Women's Junior European Volleyball Championship Qualification
  - Italy
  - Serbia
  - Turkey
  - Bulgaria
  - Slovenia
  - Belgium
  - Czech Republic
  - Russia
  - Netherlands
  - Greece

== Pools ==
Pool A	Pool B
Czech Republic	Italy
Serbia	Belgium
Bulgaria	Finland
Estonia	Russia
Netherlands	Turkey
Greece	Slovenia

== Preliminary round ==
=== Pool A ===
- Venue: A. Le Coq Sports Hall, Tartu, Estonia

Pos	Team	Pld	W	L	Pts	SW	SL	SR	SPW	SPL	SPR	Qualification
1	Serbia	5	5	0	15	15	0	MAX	375	265	1.415	Semifinals
2	Greece	5	4	1	12	12	4	3.000	371	318	1.167	Semifinals
3	Czech Republic	5	3	2	9	10	8	1.250	387	383	1.010	5th to 8th place
4	Bulgaria	5	2	3	5	7	11	0.636	377	396	0.952	5th to 8th place
5	Netherlands	5	1	4	4	5	12	0.417	337	385	0.875	
6	Estonia	5	0	5	0	1	15	0.067	295	395	0.747	

Date	Time		Score		Set 1	Set 2	Set 3	Set 4	Set 5	Total	Report
16-Aug	14:00	Greece	3–1	Czech Republic	21–25	25–10	25–18	25–21		96–74	Report
16-Aug	16:30	Bulgaria	3–2	Netherlands	21–25	25–14	25–21	21–25	15–8	107–93	Report
16-Aug	19:00	Serbia	3–0	Estonia	25–18	25–19	25–21			75–58	Report
17-Aug	14:00	Czech Republic	3–1	Bulgaria	25–20	25–17	20–25	25–17		95–79	Report
17-Aug	16:30	Serbia	3–0	Greece	25–20	25–13	25–16			75–49	Report
17-Aug	19:00	Estonia	0–3	Netherlands	21–25	21–25	10–25			52–75	Report
18-Aug	14:00	Bulgaria	0–3	Serbia	21–25	18–25	22–25			61–75	Report
18-Aug	16:30	Netherlands	0–3	Czech Republic	20–25	23–25	22–25			65–75	Report
18-Aug	19:00	Greece	3–0	Estonia	25–23	25–18	25–18			75–59	Report
20-Aug	14:00	Serbia	3–0	Netherlands	25–13	25–17	25–19			75–49	Report
20-Aug	16:30	Greece	3–0	Bulgaria	25–18	25–22	25–15			75–55	Report
20-Aug	19:00	Estonia	1–3	Czech Republic	15–25	14–25	25–20	14–25		68–95	Report
21-Aug	14:00	Netherlands	0–3	Greece	15–25	24–26	16–25			55–76	Report
21-Aug	16:30	Czech Republic	0–3	Serbia	18–25	16–25	14–25			48–75	Report
21-Aug	19:00	Bulgaria	3–0	Estonia	25–21	25–14	25–23			75–58	Report

=== Pool B ===
- Venue: TESC E-Hall, Tampere, Finland

Pos	Team	Pld	W	L	Pts	SW	SL	SR	SPW	SPL	SPR	Qualification
1	Slovenia	5	4	1	12	13	3	4.333	390	340	1.147	Semifinals
2	Turkey	5	4	1	11	12	7	1.714	411	395	1.041	Semifinals
3	Russia	5	3	2	9	12	9	1.333	471	448	1.051	5th to 8th place
4	Belgium	5	3	2	8	10	10	1.000	432	424	1.019	5th to 8th place
5	Italy	5	1	4	5	8	13	0.615	442	444	0.995	
6	Finland	5	0	5	0	2	15	0.133	327	450	0.727	

Date	Time		Score		Set 1	Set 2	Set 3	Set 4	Set 5	Total	Report
16-Aug	14:00	Italy	2–3	Belgium	24–26	25–16	25–10	16–25	13–15	103–92	Report
16-Aug	16:30	Finland	0–3	Russia	26–28	22–25	13–25			61–78	Report
16-Aug	19:00	Turkey	0–3	Slovenia	19–25	22–25	18–25			59–75	Report
17-Aug	14:00	Belgium	3–1	Russia	21–25	25–14	25–20	25–17		96–76	Report
17-Aug	16:30	Slovenia	3–0	Finland	25–20	25–19	25–21			75–60	Report
17-Aug	19:00	Italy	1–3	Turkey	16–25	25–11	22–25	18–25		81–86	Report
18-Aug	14:00	Russia	3–1	Slovenia	23–25	25–22	25–23	25–20		98–90	Report
18-Aug	16:30	Turkey	3–1	Belgium	17–25	25–15	25–22	25–21		92–83	Report
18-Aug	19:00	Finland	1–3	Italy	17–25	25–21	18–25	17–25		77–96	Report
20-Aug	14:00	Belgium	0–3	Slovenia	17–25	23–25	23–25			63–75	Report
20-Aug	16:30	Italy	2–3	Russia	25–23	13–25	28–26	23–25	13–15	102–114	Report
20-Aug	19:00	Turkey	3–0	Finland	25–15	25–19	25–17			75–51	Report
21-Aug	14:00	Slovenia	3–0	Italy	25–16	25–22	25–22			75–60	Report
21-Aug	16:30	Russia	2–3	Turkey	23–25	25–21	20–25	25–13	12–15	105–99	Report
21-Aug	19:00	Finland	1–3	Belgium	25–21	23–25	18–25	12–25		78–96	Report

== Championship round ==
- Venue: A. Le Coq Sports Hall, Tartu, Estonia

Semifinals
Serbia	3
Turkey	0
Slovenia	3
Greece	0

Final
Serbia	3
Slovenia	2
Third place
Turkey	3
Greece	1

=== 5th to 8th bracket ===
Semifinals
Czech Republic	3
Belgium	1
Bulgaria	3
Russia	2

5th place
Czech Republic	2
Bulgaria	3
7th place
Belgium	1
Russia	3

=== Classification 5–8 ===
Date	Time		Score		Set 1	Set 2	Set 3	Set 4	Set 5	Total	Report
23-Aug	11:30	Czech Republic	3–1	Belgium	25–18	25–22	19–25	25–17		94–82	Report
23-Aug	14:00	Bulgaria	3–2	Russia	25–21	16–25	10–25	25–23	15–5	91–99	Report

=== Semifinals ===
Date	Time		Score		Set 1	Set 2	Set 3	Set 4	Set 5	Total	Report
23-Aug	16:30	Serbia	3–0	Turkey	25–21	25–21	25–12			75–54	Report
23-Aug	19:00	Slovenia	3–0	Greece	25–16	25–21	25–16			75–53	Report

=== Classification 7–8 ===
Date	Time		Score		Set 1	Set 2	Set 3	Set 4	Set 5	Total	Report
24-Aug	14:00	Belgium	1–3	Russia	19–25	25–19	18–25	17–25		79–94	Report

=== Classification 5–6 ===
Date	Time		Score		Set 1	Set 2	Set 3	Set 4	Set 5	Total	Report
24-Aug	16:30	Czech Republic	2–3	Bulgaria	19–25	25–21	25–22	8–25	17–19	94–112	Report

=== Classification 3–4 ===
Date	Time		Score		Set 1	Set 2	Set 3	Set 4	Set 5	Total	Report
24-Aug	16:30	Turkey	3–1	Greece	18–25	25–18	25–23	25–15		93–81	Report

=== Final ===
Date	Time		Score		Set 1	Set 2	Set 3	Set 4	Set 5	Total	Report
24-Aug	19:00	Serbia	3–2	Slovenia	25–23	17–25	24–26	25–17	15–12	106–103	Report

== Final standing ==
Rank	Team
1st place, gold medalist(s)	Serbia
2nd place, silver medalist(s)	Slovenia
3rd place, bronze medalist(s)	Turkey
4	Greece
5	Bulgaria
6	Czech Republic
7	Russia
8	Belgium
9	Italy
10	Netherlands
11	Finland
12	Estonia

2016 Women's Junior European champions

Serbia
1st title

== Individual awards ==
- Most valuable player Tijana Bošković (SRB)
- Best scorer Anthi Vasilantonaki (GRE)
- Best setter Eva Mori (SLO)
- Best receiver Bojana Milenković (SRB)
- Best libero Maja Pahor (SLO)
- Best server Sara Lozo (SRB)
- Best blocker Anastasia Barchuk (RUS)
- Best spiker Pelin Aroğuz (TUR)
