= Beren Yeşilırmak =

Turkish volleyball player (born 2005)

- 2026 İlbank

Personal information
- Full name: Beren Yeşilırmak
- Born: June 1, 2005 (age 21) Mersin, Turkey
- Height: 1.86 m (6 ft 1 in)
- Weight: 61 kg (134 lb)
- Spike: 282 cm (111 in)
- Block: 268 cm (106 in)

Volleyball information
- Position: Opposite/Outside
- Current club: Ilbank
- Number: 4 (Club), 34 (National Team)

Career
- Years: Team
- 2017–2019; 2019–2023; 2021–2022; 2023–2024; 2023-2024; 2024-2025; 2025-: Galatasaray (youth); Galatasaray; İstanbul Büyükşehir Belediyespor; Çukurova Belediyesi Adana Demirspor; İlbank; Zeren; İlbank

National team
- Years: Team
- Turkey
Honours
Women's volleyball
Representing Turkey
Mediterranean Games
| Gold medal – first place | 2026 Taranto | Team |
Junior European Championship
| Gold medal – first place | 2024 Sofia/Dublin |

Beren Yeşilırmak (born June 1, 2005 in Mersin, Turkey) is a Turkish female volleyball player. She is 186 cm (6.10 ft) tall at 61 kg (134 lb) and plays in the Wing-Spiker position. She plays for Çukurova Belediyesi Adana Demirspor.

== Youth career ==
Yeşilırmak, who was born in Mersin on June 1, 2005, started volleyball in Mersin Yenişehir. After her education at Mersin Toros College, she transferred to the Galatasaray youth team in 2017.

== Club career ==
=== Galatasaray ===
She was included in the Galatasaray A Team squad in the 2019-20 season.

On 13 October 2019, Galatasaray HDI Sigorta Women's Volleyball Team faced Nilüfer Belediye on the road in the first week match of the Vestel Venus Sultans League of the 2019-20 volleyball season. Beren entered the game in the 2nd set of the match and used the service, wearing the Galatasaray jersey for the first time in an official match.

On February 7, 2022, Galatasaray extended the contract of Yeşilırmak for 2 more years.

=== İstanbul Büyükşehir Belediyespor (loan) ===
She played for İstanbul Büyükşehir Belediyespor with a double license on loan in the 2021–22 season. Istanbul team competed in the Turkish Women's First Volleyball League.

== International career ==
Yeşilırmak was called up to the Turkey national team, and won the gold medal at the 2026 Mediterranean Games in Taranto, Italy.
