= Simone Storm =

Brazilian volleyball player (born 1969)

Personal information
- Born: 1 March 1969 (age 57) Brusque, Brazil

Sport
- Sport: Volleyball

Simone Storm (born 1 March 1969) is a Brazilian former volleyball player and model. She competed in the women's tournament at the 1988 Summer Olympics and later played in Brazil women's national volleyball team.
