= Dilay Özdemir =

Turkish volleyball player (born 2005)

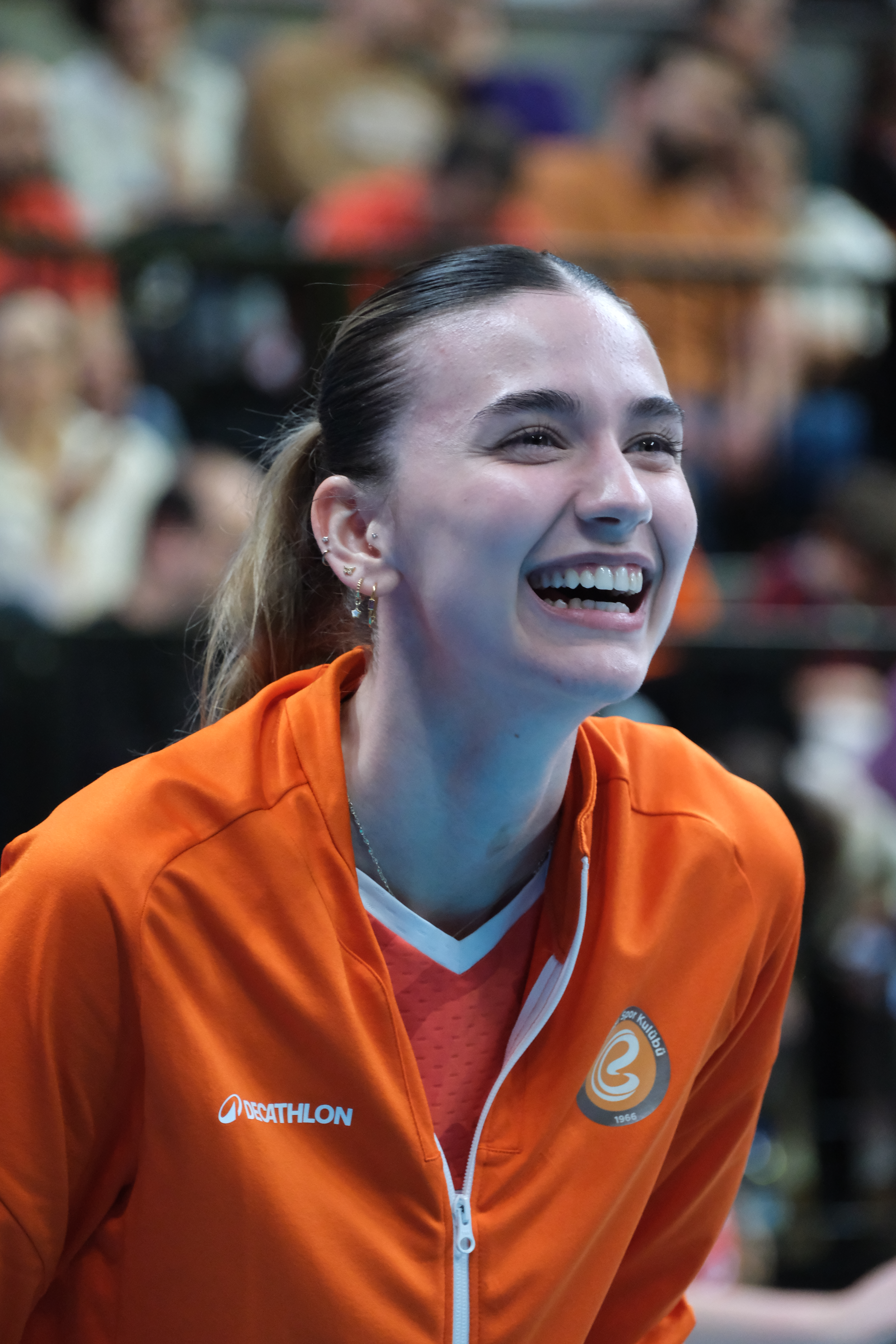
- Dilay Özdemir in 2026

Personal information
- Born: 15 August 2005 (age 21); Turkey
- Height: 1.89 m (6 ft 2 1/2 in)
- Spike: 295 cm (116 in)
- Block: 298 cm (117 in)

Volleyball information
- Position: Setter
- Current club: (Turkey) Eczacıbaşı

Career
Years	Teams
2020–2021	(Turkey) Eczacıbaşı
2021–2023	(Turkey) Beşiktaş
2021–2023	(Turkey) Eczacıbaşı
2023–2024	(Turkey) → Karayolları
2024–2025	(Turkey) Beşiktaş
2025–	(Turkey) Eczacıbaşı

National team
2022	Turkey U18
2025–	Turkey
Honours
Women's volleyball
Representing Turkey
FIVB Nations League
Gold medal – first place	2026 Macau	Team
Mediterranean Games
Gold medal – first place	2026 Taranto	Team
Islamic Solidarity Games
Gold medal – first place	2025 Rıyadh	Team

Dilay Özdemir (born 15 August 2005) is a Turkish professional volleyball player. She plays in the setter position. Currently, she plays for Beşiktaş and is a member of the Turkey women's national volleyball team.

== Personal life ==
Dilay Özdemir was born on 15 August 2005.

== Club career ==
She is 1.89 m (6 ft 2 1/2 in) tall, and plays in the setter position.

Özdemir started her career in the Academy team of Eczacıbaşı in the 2020–21 season. The next season, she transferred to Beşiktaş, where she played two seasons. She then returned to her former club Eczacıbaşı. For the 2023–24 season, she was loaned out to Karayolları. She was again with Beşktaş in the 2024–25 season. In June 2025, she returned once again to Eczacıbaşı for the upcoming season.

== International career ==
With the Turkey girls' U18 team, she took part at the 2022 European Youth Summer Olympic Festival in Banská Bystrica, Slovakia, where she won the silver medal.

Özdemir was selected to the Turkey women's national volleyball team to play at the 2025 FIVB Women's Volleyball Nations League.

She was part of the Turkey team, which became champion at the 2025 Islamic Solidarity Games in Riyadh, Saudi Arabia.

She captured gold medal at the 2026 FIVB Women's Volleyball Nations League n Macau, China, and at the 2026 Mediterranean Games in Taranto, Italy.

== Honours ==
Turkey
(silver) 2022 European Youth Summer Olympic Festi
(gold) 2025 Islamic Solidarity Games

:  2026 Mediterranean Games
