= 2022 Women's U19 Volleyball European Championship =

Tournament details
- Host country: North Macedonia
- City: Skopje
- Dates: 27 August – 4 September 2022
- Teams: 12 (from 1 confederation)
- Venues: 2 (in 1 host city)

Final positions
- Champions: Italy (8th title)
- Runners-up: Serbia
- Third place: Poland
- Fourth place: Netherlands

Tournament awards
- MVP: (Italy) Julia Ituma
- Best Setter: (Serbia) Nina Mandović
- Best OH: (Poland) Karolina Staniszewska (Serbia) Aleksandra Uzelac
- Best MB: (Italy) Nausica Acciarri (Serbia) Hena Kurtagić
- Best OPP: (Serbia) Jovana Zelenović
- Best Libero: (Italy) Manuela Ribechi

Tournament statistics
- Matches played: 38
- Attendance: 5,849 (154 per match)

The 2022 Women's Junior European Volleyball Championship was the 28th edition of the competition, with the main phase (contested between 12 teams) held in North Macedonia (host city Skopje) from 27 August to 4 September 2022.

== Qualification ==
Means of qualification		Qualifier
Host Country		North Macedonia
Qualification 2nd round	Pool A	Italy
Qualification 2nd round	Pool B	Croatia
Qualification 2nd round	Pool C	Romania
Qualification 2nd round	Pool D	Slovenia
Qualification 2nd round	Pool E	Greece
Qualification 2nd round	Pool F	Switzerland
Qualification 2nd round	Pool G	Poland
Qualification 2nd round	Pool H	Serbia
Qualification 2nd round	Pool I	Turkey
Qualification 3rd round	Pool J	Netherlands
Qualification 3rd round	Pool K	Finland

== Venues ==
Pool I, Final Round		Pool II, Classification matches
Boris Trajkovski Sports Center	Skopje, North Macedonia	Jane Sandanski Arena
Capacity: 7,000	Skopje is located in North Macedonia	Capacity: 7,500

== Pools composition ==
The drawing of lots was held on 12 May 2022 and performed as follows:

1. Organiser, North Macedonia, were seeded in Pool I
2. The highest ranked participating team from the CEV European Ranking, Turkey, were seeded in Pool II
3. Remaining 10 participating teams drawn after they were previously placed in five cups as per their position in the latest European Ranking (winners of 3rd round qualification unknown at the time of the draw were placed in last pot)

Pot 1	Pot 2	Pot 3	Pot 4	Pot 5
Serbia; Poland	Italy; Croatia	Romania; Slovenia	Greece; Switzerland	Netherlands; Finland

Result

Pool I	Pool II
North Macedonia	Turkey
Poland	Serbia
Italy	Croatia
Slovenia	Romania
Greece	Switzerland
Finland	Netherlands

== Preliminary round ==
=== Pool I ===
Pos	Team	Pld	W	L	Pts	SW	SL	SR	SPW	SPL	SPR	Qualification
1	Italy	5	5	0	15	15	1	15.000	393	284	1.384	Semifinals
2	Poland	5	4	1	11	12	5	2.400	401	333	1.204	Semifinals
3	Slovenia	5	3	2	9	10	6	1.667	370	339	1.091	5th–8th Semifinals
4	Finland	5	2	3	6	8	11	0.727	391	402	0.973	5th–8th Semifinals
5	Greece	5	1	4	4	5	12	0.417	351	390	0.900	
6	North Macedonia	5	0	5	0	0	15	0.000	217	375	0.579	

Date	Time		Score		Set 1	Set 2	Set 3	Set 4	Set 5	Total	Report
27 Aug	15:30	Italy	3–1	Slovenia	25–19	18–25	25–21	25–14		93–79	Report
27 Aug	18:00	Poland	3–0	Greece	25–16	28–26	25–19			78–61	Report
27 Aug	20:30	Finland	3–0	North Macedonia	25–10	25–19	25–20			75–49	Report
28 Aug	15:30	Italy	3–0	Poland	25–18	25–23	25–23			75–64	Report
28 Aug	18:00	Greece	2–3	Finland	25–18	17–25	25–22	22–25	5–15	94–105	Report
28 Aug	20:30	Slovenia	3–0	North Macedonia	25–13	25–20	25–14			75–47	Report
29 Aug	15:30	Finland	0–3	Italy	17–25	19–25	18–25			54–75	Report
29 Aug	18:00	Poland	3–0	Slovenia	25–23	25–17	25–22			75–62	Report
29 Aug	20:30	North Macedonia	0–3	Greece	17–25	19–25	17–25			53–75	Report
31 Aug	15:30	Poland	3–2	Finland	21–25	25–23	23–25	25–16	15–12	109–101	Report
31 Aug	18:00	Slovenia	3–0	Greece	25–23	29–27	25–18			79–68	Report
31 Aug	20:30	Italy	3–0	North Macedonia	25–13	25–7	25–14			75–34	Report
1 Sep	15:30	Finland	0–3	Slovenia	20–25	17–25	19–25			56–75	Report
1 Sep	18:00	Greece	0–3	Italy	16–25	18–25	19–25			53–75	Report
1 Sep	20:30	North Macedonia	0–3	Poland	8–25	8–25	18–25			34–75	Report

=== Pool II ===
Pos	Team	Pld	W	L	Pts	SW	SL	SR	SPW	SPL	SPR	Qualification
1	Serbia	5	5	0	15	15	0	MAX	379	269	1.409	Semifinals
2	Netherlands	5	4	1	12	12	4	3.000	383	332	1.154	Semifinals
3	Turkey	5	3	2	9	9	7	1.286	375	333	1.126	5th–8th Semifinals
4	Croatia	5	2	3	6	7	10	0.700	371	379	0.979	5th–8th Semifinals
5	Romania	5	1	4	3	4	12	0.333	328	382	0.859	
6	Switzerland	5	0	5	0	1	15	0.067	259	400	0.648	

Date	Time		Score		Set 1	Set 2	Set 3	Set 4	Set 5	Total	Report
27 Aug	15:30	Serbia	3–0	Switzerland	25–20	25–11	25–9			75–40	Report
27 Aug	18:00	Turkey	0–3	Netherlands	21–25	19–25	24–26			64–76	Report
27 Aug	20:30	Croatia	3–0	Romania	26–24	25–21	25–14			76–59	Report
28 Aug	15:30	Netherlands	3–0	Switzerland	25–20	25–12	25–15			75–47	Report
28 Aug	18:00	Romania	0–3	Serbia	18–25	27–29	12–25			57–79	Report
28 Aug	20:30	Turkey	3–0	Croatia	25–22	25–20	25–18			75–60	Report
29 Aug	15:30	Switzerland	0–3	Romania	22–25	17–25	13–25			52–75	Report
29 Aug	18:00	Croatia	1–3	Netherlands	17–25	25–23	24–26	16–25		82–99	Report
29 Aug	20:30	Serbia	3–0	Turkey	25–23	25–17	25–21			75–61	Report
31 Aug	15:30	Netherlands	3–0	Romania	25–20	25–21	25–23			75–64	Report
31 Aug	18:00	Turkey	3–0	Switzerland	25–12	25–20	25–17			75–49	Report
31 Aug	20:30	Croatia	0–3	Serbia	19–25	22–25	12–25			53–75	Report
1 Sep	15:30	Romania	1–3	Turkey	27–25	20–25	15–25	11–25		73–100	Report
1 Sep	18:00	Serbia	3–0	Netherlands	25–22	25–17	25–19			75–58	Report
1 Sep	20:30	Switzerland	1–3	Croatia	15–25	27–25	15–25	14–25		71–100	Report

== 5th–8th classification ==
Semifinals
3 September
Slovenia	2
Croatia	3
3 September
Turkey	3
Finland	0

5th place match
4 September
Croatia	0
Turkey	3
7th place match
4 September
Slovenia	3
Finland	0

=== 5th–8th Semifinals ===
Date	Time		Score		Set 1	Set 2	Set 3	Set 4	Set 5	Total	Report
3 Sep	12:00	Slovenia	2–3	Croatia	25–18	19–25	25–12	27–29	17–19	113–103	Report
3 Sep	14:30	Turkey	3–0	Finland	25–13	25–16	25–8			75–37	Report

=== 7th place match ===
Date	Time		Score		Set 1	Set 2	Set 3	Set 4	Set 5	Total	Report
4 Sep	12:00	Slovenia	3–0	Finland	26–24	25–9	25–10			76–43	Report

=== 5th place match ===
Date	Time		Score		Set 1	Set 2	Set 3	Set 4	Set 5	Total	Report
4 Sep	14:30	Croatia	0–3	Turkey	21–25	21–25	20–25			62–75	Report

== Final round ==
Semifinals
3 September
Italy	3
Netherlands	0
3 September
Serbia	3
Poland	0

Final
4 September
Italy	3
Serbia	2
3rd place match
4 September
Netherlands	1
Poland	3

=== Semifinals ===
Date	Time		Score		Set 1	Set 2	Set 3	Set 4	Set 5	Total	Report
3 Sep	17:00	Italy	3–0	Netherlands	25–21	25–21	25–16			75–58	Report
3 Sep	19:30	Serbia	3–0	Poland	25–21	25–9	25–18			75–48	Report

=== 3rd place match ===
Date	Time		Score		Set 1	Set 2	Set 3	Set 4	Set 5	Total	Report
4 Sep	17:00	Netherlands	1–3	Poland	16–25	26–24	25–27	21–25		88–101	Report

=== Final ===
Date	Time		Score		Set 1	Set 2	Set 3	Set 4	Set 5	Total	Report
4 Sep	19:30	Italy	3–2	Serbia	17–25	27–25	25–21	15–25	17–15	101–111	Report

== Final standing ==
Rank	Team
1st place, gold medalist(s)	Italy
2nd place, silver medalist(s)	Serbia
3rd place, bronze medalist(s)	Poland
4	Netherlands
5	Turkey
6	Croatia
7	Slovenia
8	Finland
9	Greece
10	Romania
11	Switzerland
12	North Macedonia

Qualified for the 2023 Women's U21 World Championship

== Awards ==
- Most valuable player
  (Italy) Julia Ituma
- Best setter
  (Serbia) Nina Mandović
- Best outside spikers
  (Poland) Karolina Staniszewska
  (Serbia) Aleksandra Uzelac
- Best middle blockers
  (Italy) Nausica Acciarri
  (Serbia) Hena Kurtagić
- Best opposite spiker
  (Serbia) Jovana Zelenović
- Best libero
  (Italy) Manuela Ribechi

== See also ==
- 2022 Men's U20 Volleyball European Championship
