= 2022 Women's U21 NORCECA Pan American Cup =

Tournament details
- Host country: Mexico
- Dates: 5–13 June 2022
- Teams: 10
- Venue: (in Baja California Sur host cities)

Final positions
- Champions: United States (2nd title)
- Runners-up: Argentina
- Third place: Mexico

Tournament awards
- MVP: Merrit Beason (USA)

The 2022 Women's U21 NORCECA Pan American Cup was the sixth edition of the bi-annual women's volleyball tournament. Ten teams participated in this edition held in Baja California Sur.

The United States won their second title. Merrit Beason of the United States won the Most Valuable Player award.

== Preliminary round ==
=== Group A ===
Pos	Team	Pld	W	L	Pts	SPW	SPL	SPR	SW	SL	SR	Qualification
1	Cuba	2	2	0	9	177	147	1.204	6	1	6.000	Quarterfinals
2	Puerto Rico	2	1	1	4	207	216	0.958	4	5	0.800	Quarterfinals
3	Dominican Republic	2	0	2	2	171	192	0.891	2	6	0.333	

Date	Time		Score		Set 1	Set 2	Set 3	Set 4	Set 5	Total	Report
7 June	02:00	Dominican Republic	2–3	Puerto Rico	23–25	29–27	22–25	26–24	14–16	114–117	P2 P3
8 June	02:00	Cuba	3–1	Puerto Rico	23–25	25–16	29–27	25–22		102–90	P2 P3
9 June	04:00	Dominican Republic	0–3	Cuba	23–25	17–25	17–25			57–75	P2 P3

=== Group B ===
Pos	Team	Pld	W	L	Pts	SPW	SPL	SPR	SW	SL	SR	Qualification
1	Mexico	2	2	0	10	150	80	1.875	6	0	MAX	Semifinals
2	Chile	2	1	1	5	124	113	1.097	3	3	1.000	Quarterfinals
3	Honduras	2	0	2	0	69	150	0.460	0	6	0.000	

Date	Time		Score		Set 1	Set 2	Set 3	Set 4	Set 5	Total	Report
7 June	08:00	Mexico	3–0	Honduras	25–7	25–18	25–6			75–31	P2 P3
8 June	08:00	Mexico	3–0	Chile	25–17	25–12	25–20			75–49	P2 P3
9 June	06:00	Chile	3–0	Honduras	25–13	25–18	25–7			75–38	P2 P3

=== Group C ===
Pos	Team	Pld	W	L	Pts	SPW	SPL	SPR	SW	SL	SR	Qualification
1	United States	3	3	0	14	249	165	1.509	9	1	9.000	Semifinals
2	Argentina	3	2	1	11	237	181	1.309	7	3	2.333	Quarterfinals
3	Canada	3	1	2	5	180	195	0.923	3	6	0.500	
4	Costa Rica	3	0	3	0	100	225	0.444	0	9	0.000	

Date	Time		Score		Set 1	Set 2	Set 3	Set 4	Set 5	Total	Report
7 June	04:00	Argentina	3–0	Canada	25–17	25–8	25–22			75–47	P2 P3
7 June	06:00	United States	3–0	Costa Rica	25–8	25–4	25–8			75–20	P2 P3
8 June	04:00	Argentina	3–0	Costa Rica	25–12	25–12	25–11			75–35	P2 P3
8 June	06:00	United States	3–0	Canada	25–17	25–19	25–22			75–58	P2 P3
9 June	02:00	Costa Rica	0–3	Canada	16–25	18–25	11–25			45–75	P2 P3
9 June	08:00	Argentina	1–3	United States	16–25	21–25	25–22	25–27		87–99	P2 P3

== Final round ==
=== Championship bracket ===
Quarterfinals
C2	Argentina	3
A2	Puerto Rico	0
A1	Cuba	0
B2	Chile	3

Semifinals
C2	Argentina	3
B1	Mexico	1
C1	United States	3
B2	Chile	0

Final
C2	Argentina	1
C1	United States	3
Third place
B1	Mexico	3
B2	Chile	0

=== 7th–10th place match ===
Date	Time		Score		Set 1	Set 2	Set 3	Set 4	Set 5	Total	Report
10 June	02:00	Dominican Republic	3–0	Costa Rica	25–11	25–15	25–18			75–44	P2 P3
10 June	04:00	Canada	3–0	Honduras	25–17	25–15	25–9			75–41	P2 P3

=== Quarterfinals ===
Date	Time		Score		Set 1	Set 2	Set 3	Set 4	Set 5	Total	Report
10 June	06:00	Argentina	3–0	Puerto Rico	25–20	25–12	25–13			75–45	P2 P3
10 June	08:00	Cuba	0–3	Chile	24–26	22–25	25–27			71–78	P2 P3

=== 9th place match ===
Date	Time		Score		Set 1	Set 2	Set 3	Set 4	Set 5	Total	Report
11 June	02:00	Costa Rica	3–0	Honduras	25–22	25–15	25–17			75–54	P2 P3

=== 7th place match ===
Date	Time		Score		Set 1	Set 2	Set 3	Set 4	Set 5	Total	Report
11 June	04:00	Dominican Republic	0–3	Canada	15–25	15–25	22–25			52–75	P2 P3

=== Semifinals ===
Date	Time		Score		Set 1	Set 2	Set 3	Set 4	Set 5	Total	Report
11 June	08:00	Mexico	1–3	Argentina	24–26	25–27	30–28	7–25		86–106	P2 P3
11 June	06:00	United States	3–0	Chile	25–11	25–13	25–9			75–33	P2 P3

=== 5th place match ===
Date	Time		Score		Set 1	Set 2	Set 3	Set 4	Set 5	Total	Report
12 June	04:00	Puerto Rico	2–3	Cuba	25–17	15–25	13–25	25–18	11–15	89–100	P2 P3

=== 3rd place match ===
Date	Time		Score		Set 1	Set 2	Set 3	Set 4	Set 5	Total	Report
12 June	06:00	Mexico	3–0	Chile	26–24	25–11	25–19			76–54	P2 P3

=== Final ===
Date	Time		Score		Set 1	Set 2	Set 3	Set 4	Set 5	Total	Report
12 June	08:00	Argentina	1–3	United States	20–25	25–21	22–25	14–25		81–96	P2 P3

== Final standing ==
Rank	Team
1st place, gold medalist(s)	United States
2nd place, silver medalist(s)	Argentina
3rd place, bronze medalist(s)	Mexico
4	Chile
5	Cuba
6	Puerto Rico
7	Canada
8	Dominican Republic
9	Costa Rica
10	Honduras

== Individual awards ==
- Most valuable player
  - Merrit Beason (USA)
- Best scorer
  - Valentina Vaulet (ARG)
- Best setter
  - Regina Perez (MEX)
- Best Opposite
  - Valentina Vaulet (ARG)
- Best spikers
  - Chloe Chicoine (USA)
  - Madyson Saris (CAN)
- Best middle blockers
  - Avril Garcia (ARG)
  - Marcelle Baez (PUR)
- Best libero
  - Cassandra Simental (MEX)
- Best server
  - Madyson Saris (CAN)
- Best receiver
  - Cassandra Simental (MEX)
- Best digger
  - Cassandra Simental (MEX)
