= Women's U21 NORCECA Continental Championship =

- Most recent season or competition: 2024 Women's U21 NORCECA Continental Championship
- Sport: Volleyball
- Founded: 1998
- Continent: NORCECA
- Most recent champion: United States (8th title)
- Most titles: United States (8 titles)

The NORCECA Women's Junior Continental Championship U-21 is a volleyball competition for national teams, currently held biannually and organized by the NORCECA, the North America, Central America and Caribbean volleyball federation. The competition is played by women's under-21 teams.

== History ==
NORCECA Championship
Year	Host	Gold	Silver	Bronze
1998; Details	Mexico	United States	Mexico	Canada
2000; Details	Cuba	Cuba	United States	Mexico
2002; Details	Puerto Rico	Puerto Rico	United States	Cuba
2004; Details	Canada	United States	Dominican Republic	Puerto Rico
2006; Details	Mexico	United States	Dominican Republic	Puerto Rico
2008; Details	Mexico	United States	Dominican Republic	Cuba
2010; Details	Mexico	United States	Dominican Republic	Cuba
2012; Details	Nicaragua	Dominican Republic	Mexico	United States
2014; Details	Guatemala	United States	Cuba	Dominican Republic
2016; Details	United States	Dominican Republic	United States	Cuba
2018; Details	Mexico	United States	Dominican Republic	Mexico
2024; Details	Canada	United States	Puerto Rico	Dominican Republic

== Medal table ==
Rank	Nation	Gold	Silver	Bronze	Total
1	United States	8	3	1	12
2	Dominican Republic	2	5	2	9
3	Cuba	1	1	4	6
4	Puerto Rico	1	1	2	4
5	Mexico	0	2	2	4
6	Canada	0	0	1	1
Totals (6 entries)		12	12	12	36

== See also ==
- Men's Junior NORCECA Volleyball Championship
