= 2023 Women's U21 NORCECA Pan American Cup =

Tournament details
- Host country: Mexico
- Dates: 21–29 May 2023
- Teams: 8
- Venue: (in Nogales host cities)

Final positions
- Champions: United States (3rd title)
- Runners-up: Mexico
- Third place: Cuba

Tournament awards
- MVP: Chloe Chicoine (USA)

The 2023 Women's U21 NORCECA Pan American Cup was the seventh edition of the bi-annual women's volleyball tournament. Eight teams participated in this edition held in Nogales.

The United States won their third title. Cloe Chicoine of the United States won the Most Valuable Player award.

== Preliminary round ==
=== Group A ===
Pos	Team	Pld	W	L	Pts	SPW	SPL	SPR	SW	SL	SR
1	Mexico	3	3	0	14	245	177	1.384	9	1	9.000
2	Cuba	3	2	1	11	231	196	1.179	7	3	2.333
3	Puerto Rico	3	1	2	5	191	193	0.990	3	6	0.500
4	Belize	3	0	3	0	124	225	0.551	0	9	0.000

Date	Time		Score		Set 1	Set 2	Set 3	Set 4	Set 5	Total	Report
24 May	14:00	Cuba	3–0	Belize	25–14	25–12	25–18			75–44	P2 P3
24 May	20:00	Mexico	3–0	Puerto Rico	25–18	25–20	25–21			75–59	P2 P3
25 May	14:00	Puerto Rico	3–0	Belize	25–12	25–18	25–13			75–43	P2 P3
25 May	20:00	Mexico	3–1	Cuba	25–16	25–23	20–25	25–17		95–81	P2 P3

=== Group B ===
Pos	Team	Pld	W	L	Pts	SPW	SPL	SPR	SW	SL	SR
1	United States	3	3	0	15	225	113	1.991	9	0	MAX
2	Dominican Republic	3	2	1	10	200	171	1.170	6	3	2.000
3	Costa Rica	3	1	2	5	157	213	0.737	3	6	0.500
4	Guatemala	3	0	3	0	140	225	0.622	0	9	0.000

Date	Time		Score		Set 1	Set 2	Set 3	Set 4	Set 5	Total	Report
24 May	14:00	United States	3–0	Guatemala	25–8	25–13	25–14			75–35	P2 P3
24 May	18:00	Dominican Republic	3–0	Costa Rica	25–20	25–17	25–17			75–54	P2 P3
25 May	16:00	Guatemala	0–3	Costa Rica	18–25	22–25	23–25			63–75	P2 P3
25 May	18:00	Dominican Republic	0–3	United States	16–25	20–25	14–25			50–75	P2 P3

== Final round ==
=== Championship bracket ===
Quarterfinals
Cuba	3
Puerto Rico	0
United States	3
Costa Rica	0
Dominican Republic	3
Guatemala	0
Mexico	3
Belize	0

Semifinals
Cuba	0
United States	3
Dominican Republic	1
Mexico	3

Final
United States	3
Mexico	0
Third place
Cuba	3
Dominican Republic	1

=== Quarterfinals ===
Date	Time		Score		Set 1	Set 2	Set 3	Set 4	Set 5	Total	Report
26 May	08:00	Cuba	3–0	Puerto Rico	25–19	25–17	25–21			75–57	P2 P3
26 May	10:00	United States	3–0	Costa Rica	25–11	25–8	25–9			75–28	P2 P3
26 May	12:00	Dominican Republic	3–0	Guatemala	25–8	25–13	25–21			75–42	P2 P3
26 May	14:00	Mexico	3–0	Belize	25–11	25–11	25–15			75–37	P2 P3
26 May	20:00	Cuba	3–0	Costa Rica	25–20	29–27	31–29			85–76	P2 P3
26 May	22:00	Dominican Republic	3–1	Puerto Rico	25–17	28–26	18–25	25–19		96–87	P2 P3

=== 5th–8th place match ===
Date	Time		Score		Set 1	Set 2	Set 3	Set 4	Set 5	Total	Report
27 May	14:00	Guatemala	1–3	Puerto Rico	17–25	14–25	25–21	9–25		65–96	P2 P3
27 May	16:00	Belize	0–3	Costa Rica	20–25	17–25	20–25			57–75	P2 P3

=== 7th place match ===
Date	Time		Score		Set 1	Set 2	Set 3	Set 4	Set 5	Total	Report
28 May	14:00	Guatemala	3–0	Belize	25–19	25–11	25–22			75–52	P2 P3

=== Semifinals ===
Date	Time		Score		Set 1	Set 2	Set 3	Set 4	Set 5	Total	Report
27 May	18:00	United States	3–0	Cuba	25–15	25–13	25–20			75–48	P2 P3
27 May	20:00	Mexico	3–1	Dominican Republic	26–24	25–21	24–26	25–17		100–88	P2 P3

=== 5th place match ===
Date	Time		Score		Set 1	Set 2	Set 3	Set 4	Set 5	Total	Report
28 May	16:00	Puerto Rico	3–0	Costa Rica	25–17	25–21	25–21			75–59	P2 P3

=== 3rd place match ===
Date	Time		Score		Set 1	Set 2	Set 3	Set 4	Set 5	Total	Report
28 May	18:00	Cuba	3–1	Dominican Republic	25–22	25–20	14–25	26–24		90–91	P2 P3

=== Final ===
Date	Time		Score		Set 1	Set 2	Set 3	Set 4	Set 5	Total	Report
28 May	20:00	United States	3–0	Mexico	25–13	25–16	25–21			75–50	P2 P3

== Final standing ==
Rank	Team
1st place, gold medalist(s)	United States
2nd place, silver medalist(s)	Mexico
3rd place, bronze medalist(s)	Cuba
4	Dominican Republic
5	Puerto Rico
6	Costa Rica
7	Guatemala
8	Belize

== Individual awards ==
- Most valuable player
  - Chloe Chicoine (USA)
- Best scorer
  - Grace López (PUR)
- Best setter
  - Rachel Fairbanks (USA)
- Best Opposite
  - Ariana Rodríguez (DOM)
- Best outside hitters
  - Chloe Chicoine (USA)
  - Norah Sis (USA)
- Best middle blockers
  - Gabrielle Essix (USA)
  - Marcelle Baez (PUR)
- Best libero
  - Andrea Cruz (PUR)
- Best server
  - Regina Pérez (MEX)
- Best receiver
  - Lauren Briceño (USA)
- Best digger
  - Andrea Cruz (PUR)
