= 2025 Women's U21 NORCECA Pan American Cup =

Volleyball competition held in Costa Rica

Tournament details
- Host country: Costa Rica
- Dates: 22–27 July 2025
- Teams: 7
- Venue: (in San José host cities)

Final positions
- Champions: United States (4th title)
- Runners-up: Chile
- Third place: Costa Rica

Tournament awards
- MVP: Brooklyn Deleye (USA)

The 2025 Women's U21 NORCECA Pan American Cup was the eighth edition of the bi-annual women's volleyball tournament. Seven teams participated in this edition held in San José.

The United States won their third consecutive and overall fourth title. Brooklyn Deleye of the United States won the Most Valuable Player award.

== Preliminary round ==
=== Group A ===
Pos	Team	Pld	W	L	Pts	SPW	SPL	SPR	SW	SL	SR	Qualification
1	Costa Rica	2	2	0	10	150	94	1.596	6	0	MAX	Semifinals
2	Dominican Republic	2	1	1	5	127	137	0.927	3	3	1.000	Quarterfinals
3	Mexico	2	0	2	0	108	154	0.701	0	6	0.000	Quarterfinals

Source: NORCECA

Date	Time		Score		Set 1	Set 2	Set 3	Set 4	Set 5	Total	Report
22 July	19:00	Costa Rica	3–0	Dominican Republic	25–19	25–14	25–15			75–48	P2 P3
23 July	19:00	Costa Rica	3–0	Mexico	25–6	25–17	25–23			75–46	P2 P3
24 July	19:00	Mexico	0–3	Dominican Republic	18–25	17–25	27–29			62–79	P2 P3

=== Group B ===
Pos	Team	Pld	W	L	Pts	SPW	SPL	SPR	SW	SL	SR	Qualification
1	United States	3	3	0	15	225	129	1.744	9	0	MAX	Semifinals
2	Chile	3	2	1	9	220	211	1.043	6	4	1.500	Quarterfinals
3	Canada	3	1	2	6	203	226	0.898	4	6	0.667	Quarterfinals
4	Puerto Rico	3	0	3	0	143	225	0.636	0	9	0.000	

Source: NORCECA

Date	Time		Score		Set 1	Set 2	Set 3	Set 4	Set 5	Total	Report
22 July	15:00	Chile	3–0	Puerto Rico	25–14	25–17	25–23			75–54	P2 P3
22 July	17:00	United States	3–0	Canada	25–18	25–15	25–13			75–46	P2 P3
23 July	15:00	United States	3–0	Puerto Rico	25–13	25–7	25–15			75–35	P2 P3
23 July	17:00	Chile	3–1	Canada	25–22	25–18	22–25	25–17		97–82	P2 P3
24 July	15:00	Puerto Rico	0–3	Canada	11–25	23–25	20–25			54–75	P2 P3
24 July	17:00	United States	3–0	Chile	25–18	25–19	25–11			75–48	P2 P3

== Final round ==
=== Championship bracket ===
Quarterfinals
A2	Dominican Republic	1
B3	Canada	3
A3	Mexico	0
B2	Chile	3

Semifinals
B1	United States	3
B3	Canada	0
A1	Costa Rica	0
B2	Chile	3

Final
B1	United States	3
B2	Chile	0
Third place
B3	Canada	1
A1	Costa Rica	3

=== Quarterfinals ===
Date	Time		Score		Set 1	Set 2	Set 3	Set 4	Set 5	Total	Report
25 July	17:00	Dominican Republic	1–3	Canada	20–25	25–22	23–25	18–25		86–97	P2 P3
25 July	19:00	Chile	3–0	Mexico	25–15	25–20	25–17			75–52	P2 P3

=== 6th place match ===
Date	Time		Score		Set 1	Set 2	Set 3	Set 4	Set 5	Total	Report
27 July	13:00	Mexico	2–3	Puerto Rico	11–25	28–26	25–21	13–25	9–15	86–112	P2 P3

=== Semifinals ===
Date	Time		Score		Set 1	Set 2	Set 3	Set 4	Set 5	Total	Report
26 July	19:00	Costa Rica	0–3	Chile	15–25	14–25	23–25			52–75	P2 P3
26 July	17:00	United States	3–0	Canada	25–17	25–19	25–20			75–56	P2 P3

=== 5th place match ===
Date	Time		Score		Set 1	Set 2	Set 3	Set 4	Set 5	Total	Report
26 July	15:00	Dominican Republic	3–0	Mexico	25–23	25–22	25–19			75–64	P2 P3

=== 3rd place match ===
Date	Time		Score		Set 1	Set 2	Set 3	Set 4	Set 5	Total	Report
27 July	15:00	Costa Rica	3–1	Canada	11–25	25–18	25–23	30–28		91–94	P2 P3

=== Final ===
Date	Time		Score		Set 1	Set 2	Set 3	Set 4	Set 5	Total	Report
27 July	17:00	Chile	0–3	United States	18–25	14–25	13–25			45–75	P2 P3

== Final standing ==
Rank	Team
1st place, gold medalist(s)	United States
2nd place, silver medalist(s)	Chile
3rd place, bronze medalist(s)	Costa Rica
4	Canada
5	Dominican Republic
6	Puerto Rico
7	Mexico

== Individual awards ==
- Most valuable player
  - Brooklyn Deleye (USA)
- Best scorer
  - Dominga Aylwin (CHI)
- Best setter
  - Ella McVittie (CAN)
- Best Opposite
  - Logan King (CAN)
- Best outside hitters
  - Brooklyn Deleye (USA)
  - Melina Abarga (CRC)
- Best middle blockers
  - Yalyn Firpo (DOM)
  - Favor Anyanwu (USA)
- Best libero
  - Rashanny Solano (CRC)
- Best server
  - Taylor Parks (USA)
- Best receiver
  - Misha Hameed (CAN)
- Best digger
  - Sofia Padron (MEX)
