= 2018 Women's Junior NORCECA Volleyball Championship =

Tournament details
- Host country: Mexico
- Dates: 16–24 June
- Teams: 8
- Venue: Aguascaliente State Sport Gymnasium (in 1 host city)

Final positions
- Champions: United States (7th title)

Tournament awards
- MVP: Logan Eggleston (USA)

The 2018 Women's Junior NORCECA Volleyball Championship was the eleventh edition of the bi-annual tournament. It was held in Aguascalientes City from 16 June to 24 June, and featured eight teams. The United States won the tournament and qualified to the 2019 FIVB Women's Junior World Championship. American Logan Eggleston was awarded Most Valuable Player.

== Teams ==
Group A	Group B
United States	Dominican Republic
Cuba	Mexico
Puerto Rico	Costa Rica
Guatemala	Honduras

== Pool standing procedure ==
Match won 3–0: 5 points for the winner, 0 point for the loser
Match won 3–1: 4 points for the winner, 1 points for the loser
Match won 3–2: 3 points for the winner, 2 points for the loser
In case of equality in the number of matches won and lost, the tie will be broken according to the following criteria in order of importance:

1. Match points
2. Point Ratio
3. Set Ratio
4. Head-to-head result

== Preliminary round ==
- All times are in Central Daylight Time–(UTC−06:00)

=== Group A ===
Pos	Team	Pld	W	L	Pts	SPW	SPL	SPR	SW	SL	SR	Qualification
1	United States	3	3	0	13	257	170	1.512	9	2	4.500	Semifinals
2	Cuba	3	2	1	11	269	234	1.150	8	4	2.000	Quarterfinals
3	Puerto Rico	3	1	2	5	221	239	0.925	4	7	0.571	Quarterfinals
4	Guatemala	3	0	3	1	145	249	0.582	1	9	0.111	

Date	Time		Score		Set 1	Set 2	Set 3	Set 4	Set 5	Total	Report
18-June	16:00	Guatemala	0–3	Cuba	20–25	14–25	12–25			46–75	P2P3
18-June	18:00	Puerto Rico	0–3	United States	13–25	9–25	19–25			41–75	P2P3
19-June	16:00	Guatemala	1–3	Puerto Rico	16–25	9–25	26–24	17–25		68–99	P2P3
19-June	18:00	Cuba	2–3	United States	25–20	18–25	19–25	25–22	11–15	98–107	
20-June	14:00	United States	3–0	Guatemala	25–13	25–11	25–7			75–31	P2P3
20-June	18:00	Puerto Rico	1–3	Cuba	20–25	24–26	25–20	12–25		81–96	P2P3

=== Group B ===
Pos	Team	Pld	W	L	Pts	SPW	SPL	SPR	SW	SL	SR	Qualification
1	Dominican Republic	3	3	0	14	245	181	1.354	9	1	9.000	Semifinals
2	Mexico	3	2	1	11	241	170	1.418	7	3	2.333	Quarterfinals
3	Costa Rica	3	1	2	5	163	210	0.776	3	6	0.500	Quarterfinals
4	Honduras	3	0	3	0	137	225	0.609	0	9	0.000	

Date	Time		Score		Set 1	Set 2	Set 3	Set 4	Set 5	Total	Report
18-June	14:00	Costa Rica	0–3	Dominican Republic	13–25	17–25	18–25			48–75	P2P3
18-June	20:00	Mexico	3–0	Honduras	25–7	25–19	25–9			75–35	P2P3
19-June	14:00	Dominican Republic	3–0	Honduras	25–16	25–12	25–14			75–42	P2P3
19-June	20:00	Mexico	3–0	Costa Rica	25–19	25–9	25–12			75–40	P2P3
20-June	16:00	Honduras	0–3	Costa Rica	22–25	16–25	22–25			60–75	P2P3
20-June	20:00	Mexico	1–3	Dominican Republic	24–26	25–19	22–25	20–25		91–95	P2P3

== Final round ==
=== Bracket ===
Quarterfinals
A2	Cuba	3
B3	Costa Rica	0
B2	Mexico	3
A3	Puerto Rico	0

Semifinals
B1	Dominican Republic	3
A2	Cuba	0
B2	Mexico	1
A1	United States	3

Finals
B1	Dominican Republic	0
A1	United States	3
Third place
B2	Mexico	3
A2	Cuba	1

Consolation semifinals
B4	Guatemala	0
A3	Costa Rica	3
B4	Honduras	1
A3	Puerto Rico	3

7th place
A4	Guatemala	0
B4	Honduras	3
5th place
B3	Costa Rica	0
A3	Puerto Rico	3

=== Quarterfinals ===
Date	Time		Score		Set 1	Set 2	Set 3	Set 4	Set 5	Total	Report
21-June	18:00	Cuba	3–0	Costa Rica	25–22	25–20	25–21			75–63	P2P3
21-June	20:00	Mexico	3–0	Puerto Rico	25–16	25–21	25–21			75–58	P2P3

=== 5th-8th Classification ===
Date	Time		Score		Set 1	Set 2	Set 3	Set 4	Set 5	Total	Report
22-June	14:00	Guatemala	0–3	Costa Rica	13–25	13–25	6–25			32–75	P2P3
22-June	16:00	Honduras	1–3	Puerto Rico	16–25	18–25	25–16	13–25		72–91	P2P3

=== Semifinals ===
Date	Time		Score		Set 1	Set 2	Set 3	Set 4	Set 5	Total	Report
22-June	18:00	Dominican Republic	3–0	Cuba	25–17	25–17	25–21			75–55	P2P3
22-June	20:00	United States	3–1	Mexico	25–20	27–25	25–27	25–9		102–81	P2P3

=== 7th place ===
Date	Time		Score		Set 1	Set 2	Set 3	Set 4	Set 5	Total	Report
23-June	14:00	Guatemala	0–3	Honduras	15–25	12–25	24–26			51–76	P2P3

=== 5th place ===
Date	Time		Score		Set 1	Set 2	Set 3	Set 4	Set 5	Total	Report
23-June	16:00	Costa Rica	0–3	Puerto Rico	9–25	11–25	13–25			33–75	P2P3

=== 3rd place ===
Date	Time		Score		Set 1	Set 2	Set 3	Set 4	Set 5	Total	Report
23-June	18:00	Mexico	3–1	Cuba	25–13	20–25	27–25	25–23		97–86	P2P3

=== Final ===
Date	Time		Score		Set 1	Set 2	Set 3	Set 4	Set 5	Total	Report
23-June	20:00	United States	3–0	Dominican Republic	25–20	25–11	25–20			75–51	P2P3

== Final standing ==
Qualified to 2019 U-20 World Championship

Rank	Team
1st place, gold medalist(s)	United States
2nd place, silver medalist(s)	Dominican Republic
3rd place, bronze medalist(s)	Mexico
4	Cuba
5	Puerto Rico
6	Costa Rica
7	Honduras
8	Guatemala

== Individual awards ==
- Most valuable player
  - Logan Eggleston (USA)
- Best setter
  - Camila de la Rosa (DOM)
- Best Opposite
  - Uxue Guereca (MEX)
- Best Outside Hitters
  - Ailama Cesé (CUB)
  - Natalia Martínez (DOM)
- Best Middle Blockers
  - Geraldine González (DOM)
  - Jaylibeth García (PUR)
- Best libero
  - Joseline Landeros (MEX)
- Best digger
  - Joseline Landeros (MEX)
- Best receiver
  - Joseline Landeros (MEX)
- Best server
  - Logan Eggleston (USA)
- Best scorer
  - Uxue Guereca (MEX)
