= United States women's national under-21 volleyball team =

United States U21
- Association: USA Volleyball
- Confederation: NORCECA

Uniforms
| Home | Away |

FIVB U21 World Championship
- Appearances: 13 (First in 1977)
- Best result: Fourth place : (2007, 2011)

Women’s U21 NORCECA Continental Championship
- Appearances: 12 (First in 1998)
- Best result: (gold) Gold : (1998, 2004, 2006, 2008, 2010, 2014, 2018, 2024)
- www.usavolleyball.org
Honours
Women's U21 NORCECA Continental Championship
| Gold medal – first place | 1998 Mexico | Team |
| Gold medal – first place | 2004 Canada | Team |
| Gold medal – first place | 2006 Mexico | Team |
| Gold medal – first place | 2008 Mexico | Team |
| Gold medal – first place | 2010 Mexico | Team |
| Gold medal – first place | 2014 Guatemala | Team |
| Gold medal – first place | 2018 Mexico | Team |
| Gold medal – first place | 2024 Toronto | Team |
| Silver medal – second place | 2000 Cuba | Team |
| Silver medal – second place | 2002 Puerto Rico | Team |
| Silver medal – second place | 2016 United States | Team |
| Bronze medal – third place | 2012 Nicaragua | Team |
Women's U21 NORCECA Pan American Cup
| Gold medal – first place | 2017 Costa Rica | Team |
| Gold medal – first place | 2022 Mexico | Team |
| Gold medal – first place | 2023 Mexico | Team |
| Gold medal – first place | 2025 Costa Rica | Team |
| Gold medal – first place | 2026 United States | Team |

The United States women's national under-21 volleyball team represents the United States in international women's volleyball competitions and friendly matches under the age 21 and it is ruled by the American Volleyball Federation USAV body. That is an affiliate of the International Volleyball Federation FIVB and also a part of the North, Central America and Caribbean Volleyball Confederation NORCECA.

== Results ==
=== FIVB Women's U21 World Championship ===
Champions Runners up Third place Fourth place

FIVB Women's U21 World Championship
| Year | Round | Position | Pld | W | L | SW | SL | Squad |
|---|---|---|---|---|---|---|---|---|
| (Brazil) 1977 | Second round | 5th place | 9 | 6 | 3 | 18 | 11 | Squad |
| (Mexico) 1981 | Didn't qualify | | | | | | | |
| (Italy) 1985 | Didn't qualify | | | | | | | |
| (South Korea) 1987 | Didn't qualify | | | | | | | |
| (Peru) 1989 | Didn't qualify | | | | | | | |
| (Czechoslovakia) 1991 | Didn't qualify | | | | | | | |
| (Brazil) 1993 | Didn't qualify | | | | | | | |
| (Thailand) 1995 | Didn't qualify | | | | | | | |
| (Poland) 1997 | Didn't qualify | | | | | | | |
| (Canada) 1999 | Quarterfinals | 8th place | 7 | 3 | 4 | 12 | 12 | Squad |
| (Dominican Republic) 2001 | Preliminary round | 13th place | 3 | 0 | 3 | 0 | 9 | Squad |
| (Thailand) 2003 | Didn't qualify | | | | | | | |
| (Turkey) 2005 | Preliminary round | 11th place | 5 | 1 | 4 | 7 | 14 | Squad |
| (Thailand) 2007 | Semi-Final | Fourth place | 7 | 4 | 3 | 15 | 10 | Squad |
| (Mexico) 2009 | First round | 12th place | 8 | 2 | 6 | 10 | 20 | Squad |
| (Peru) 2011 | Semi-Final | Fourth place | 8 | 4 | 4 | 18 | 13 | Squad |
| (Czech Republic) 2013 | Preliminary round | 17th place | 7 | 4 | 3 | 12 | 11 | Squad |
| (Puerto Rico) 2015 | Didn't qualify | | | | | | | |
| (Mexico) 2017 | Second round | 7th place | 8 | 3 | 5 | 15 | 19 | Squad |
| (Mexico) 2019 | Second round | 8th place | 8 | 2 | 6 | 8 | 18 | Squad |
| (Netherlands) (Belgium) 2021 | Second round | 5th place | 8 | 6 | 2 | 21 | 10 | Squad |
| (Mexico) 2023 | Second round | 6th place | 8 | 4 | 4 | 15 | 16 | Squad (Note: Due to a scheduling conflict with the NCAA season, competed by United States women's national under-19 volleyball team) |
| (Indonesia) 2025 | Round of 16 | 9th place | 9 | 7 | 2 | 21 | 8 | Squad |
| Total | 0 Titles | 13/23 | 95 | 46 | 49 | 172 | 171 | —N/a |

=== Women's U21 NORCECA Continental Championship ===
Champions Runners up Third place Fourth place

Women's U21 NORCECA Continental Championship
| Year | Round | Position | Pld | W | L | SW | SL | Squad |
|---|---|---|---|---|---|---|---|---|
| (Mexico) 1998 | Final | Gold | 6 | 6 | 0 | 18 | 2 | Squad |
| (Cuba) 2000 | Final | Silver | 5 | 4 | 1 | 13 | 5 | Squad |
| (Puerto Rico) 2002 | Final | Silver | 6 | 3 | 3 | 13 | 10 | Squad |
| (Canada) 2004 | Final | Gold | 4 | 4 | 0 | 12 | 1 | Squad |
| (Mexico) 2006 | Final | Gold | 5 | 5 | 0 | 15 | 2 | Squad |
| (Mexico) 2008 | Final | Gold | 6 | 5 | 1 | 16 | 5 | Squad |
| (Mexico) 2010 | Final | Gold | 5 | 5 | 0 | 15 | 0 | Squad |
| (Nicaragua) 2012 | Semi-Final | Bronze | 5 | 4 | 1 | 14 | 4 | Squad |
| (Guatemala) 2014 | Final | Gold | 4 | 4 | 0 | 12 | 0 | Squad |
| (United States) 2016 | Final | Silver | 5 | 4 | 1 | 13 | 4 | Squad |
| (Mexico) 2018 | Final | Gold | 5 | 5 | 0 | 15 | 3 | Squad |
| (Canada) 2024 | Final | Gold | 5 | 5 | 0 | 15 | 0 | Squad |
| Total | 8 Titles | 12/12 | 61 | 54 | 7 | 171 | 36 | —N/a |

=== Women's U21 NORCECA Pan American Cup ===
Champions Runners up Third place Fourth place

Women's U21 NORCECA Pan American Cup
| Year | Round | Position | Pld | W | L | SW | SL | Squad |
|---|---|---|---|---|---|---|---|---|
| (Peru) 2011 | Didn't participate | | | | | | | |
| (Cuba) 2013 | Didn't participate | | | | | | | |
| (Dominican Republic) 2015 | Didn't participate | | | | | | | |
| (Costa Rica) 2017 | Final | Champions | 5 | 5 | 0 | 15 | 3 | Squad |
| (Peru) 2019 | Didn't participate | | | | | | | |
| (Mexico) 2022 | Final | Champions | 5 | 5 | 0 | 15 | 2 | Squad |
| (Mexico) 2023 | Final | Champions | 5 | 5 | 0 | 15 | 0 | Squad |
| (Costa Rica) 2025 | Final | Champions | 5 | 5 | 0 | 15 | 0 | Squad |
| (United States) 2026 | Final | Champions | 5 | 5 | 0 | 15 | 1 | Squad |
| Total | 5 Titles | 5/9 | 25 | 25 | 0 | 75 | 6 | —N/a |

== Team ==
=== Current squad ===
The following is the American roster in the 2026 Women's U21 NORCECA Pan American Cup.

Head coach: Tama Miyashiro

| No. | Name | Date of birth | Height | Weight | Spike | Block | School / Club |
|---|---|---|---|---|---|---|---|
| 2 | Ayden Ames | | 1.93 m (6 ft 4 in) | | | | (United States) Creighton University |
| 5 | Lily Hayes | | 1.75 m (5 ft 9 in) | | | | (United States) University of Florida |
| 6 | Suli Davis | | 1.89 m (6 ft 2 in) | | | | (United States) Texas, SMU |
| 7 | Manaia Ogbechie | | 1.91 m (6 ft 3 in) | | | | (United States) University of Nebraska |
| 9 | Keoni Williams | | 1.93 m (6 ft 4 in) | | | | (United States) University of Nebraska |
| 10 | Taylor Harvey | | 1.91 m (6 ft 3 in) | | | | (United States) University of Texas |
| 11 | Campbell Flynn | | 1.91 m (6 ft 3 in) | | | | (United States) University of Nebraska |
| 12 | Genevieve Harris | | 1.80 m (5 ft 11 in) | | | | (United States) University of Texas |
| 13 | Rachel Van Gorp | | 1.75 m (5 ft 9 in) | | | | (United States) Iowa State University |
| 15 | Payton Petersen | | 1.84 m (6 ft 0 in) | | | | (United States) University of Louisville |
| 16 | Abby Vander Wal | | 1.91 m (6 ft 3 in) | | | | (United States) University of Texas |
| 17 | Carly Gilk | | 1.89 m (6 ft 2 in) | | | | (United States) University of Minnesota |
| 19 | Henley Anderson | | 1.91 m (6 ft 3 in) | | | | (United States) University of Texas |
| 20 | Devyn Wiest | | 1.91 m (6 ft 3 in) | | | | (United States) University of Utah |

== Notable players ==
- Foluke Akinradewo
- Christa Harmotto
- Cassidy Lichtman
- Kelly Murphy
- Lauren Gibbemeyer
