= 2024 Women's U21 NORCECA Continental Championship =

Tournament details
- Host country: Canada
- Dates: 23 June–1 July
- Teams: 8
- Venue: (in 1 host city)

Final positions
- Champions: United States (8th title)
- Runners-up: Puerto Rico
- Third place: Dominican Republic

Tournament awards
- MVP: Brooklyn DeLeye (USA)

The 2024 Women's U21 NORCECA Continental Championship was the twelfth edition of the bi-annual tournament. It was held in Toronto, Canada from 23 June to 1 July, and featured eight teams. The United States won the tournament with eighth titles. Brooklyn DeLeye of the United States was awarded Most Valuable Player.

== Preliminary round ==
=== Group A ===
Pos	Team	Pld	W	L	Pts	SPW	SPL	SPR	SW	SL	SR	Qualification
1	United States	3	3	0	15	225	116	1.940	9	0	MAX	Semifinals
2	Puerto Rico	3	2	1	10	192	156	1.231	6	3	2.000	Quarterfinals
3	Dominican Republic	3	1	2	5	181	167	1.084	3	6	0.500	Quarterfinals
4	Suriname	3	0	3	0	66	225	0.293	0	9	0.000	

Date	Time		Score		Set 1	Set 2	Set 3	Set 4	Set 5	Total	Report
25 June	11:00	Puerto Rico	3–0	Suriname	25–10	25–4	25–11			75–25	P2 P3
25 June	13:30	United States	3–0	Dominican Republic	25–18	25–21	25–11			75–50	P2 P3
26 June	11:00	United States	3–0	Suriname	25–10	25–5	25–9			75–24	P2 P3
26 June	13:30	Puerto Rico	3–0	Dominican Republic	25–10	25–23	25–23			75–56	P2 P3
27 June	11:00	Dominican Republic	3–0	Suriname	25–9	25–3	25–5			75–17	P2 P3
27 June	13:30	United States	3–0	Puerto Rico	25–10	25–17	25–15			75–42	P2 P3

=== Group B ===
Pos	Team	Pld	W	L	Pts	SPW	SPL	SPR	SW	SL	SR	Qualification
1	Canada	3	3	0	13	256	183	1.399	9	2	4.500	Semifinals
2	Mexico	3	2	1	12	257	176	1.460	8	3	2.667	Quarterfinals
3	Costa Rica	3	1	2	5	150	210	0.714	3	6	0.500	Quarterfinals
4	U.S. Virgin Islands	3	0	3	0	131	225	0.582	0	9	0.000	

Date	Time		Score		Set 1	Set 2	Set 3	Set 4	Set 5	Total	Report
25 June	16:30	U.S. Virgin Islands	0–3	Mexico	13–25	7–25	15–25			35–75	P2 P3
25 June	19:00	Canada	3–0	Costa Rica	25–10	25–13	25–17			75–40	P2 P3
26 June	16:30	Mexico	3–0	Costa Rica	25–9	25–11	25–15			75–35	P2 P3
26 June	19:00	Canada	3–0	U.S. Virgin Islands	25–18	25–11	25–7			75–36	P2 P3
27 June	16:30	Costa Rica	3–0	U.S. Virgin Islands	25–21	25–19	25–20			75–60	P2 P3
27 June	19:00	Canada	3–2	Mexico	25–21	27–25	15–25	24–26	15–10	106–107	P2 P3

== Final round ==
=== Bracket ===
Quarterfinals
Mexico	0
Dominican Republic	3
Puerto Rico	3
Costa Rica	0

Semifinals
United States	3
Dominican Republic	0
Puerto Rico	3
Canada	0

Finals
United States	3
Puerto Rico	0
Third place
Dominican Republic	3
Canada	0

=== Quarterfinals ===
Date	Time		Score		Set 1	Set 2	Set 3	Set 4	Set 5	Total	Report
28 June	16:30	Puerto Rico	3–0	Costa Rica	25–6	25–10	25–11			75–27	P2 P3
28 June	19:00	Mexico	0–3	Dominican Republic	12–25	13–25	23–25			48–75	P2 P3

=== 5th-8th Classification ===
Date	Time		Score		Set 1	Set 2	Set 3	Set 4	Set 5	Total	Report
29 June	11:00	Suriname	0–3	Costa Rica	18–25	11–25	15–25			44–75	P2 P3
29 June	13:30	U.S. Virgin Islands	0–3	Mexico	15–25	14–25	17–25			46–75	P2 P3

=== Semifinals ===
Date	Time		Score		Set 1	Set 2	Set 3	Set 4	Set 5	Total	Report
29 June	16:30	United States	3–0	Dominican Republic	25–20	25–13	25–12			75–45	P2 P3
29 June	19:00	Canada	0–3	Puerto Rico	24–26	21–25	16–25			61–76	P2 P3

=== 7th place ===
Date	Time		Score		Set 1	Set 2	Set 3	Set 4	Set 5	Total	Report
30 June	09:00	Suriname	0–3	U.S. Virgin Islands	13–25	19–25	16–25			48–75	P2 P3

=== 5th place ===
Date	Time		Score		Set 1	Set 2	Set 3	Set 4	Set 5	Total	Report
30 June	11:30	Costa Rica	0–3	Mexico	10–25	16–25	16–25			42–75	P2 P3

=== 3rd place ===
Date	Time		Score		Set 1	Set 2	Set 3	Set 4	Set 5	Total	Report
30 June	14:00	Dominican Republic	3–0	Canada	25–23	25–23	25–16			75–62	P2 P3

=== Final ===
Date	Time		Score		Set 1	Set 2	Set 3	Set 4	Set 5	Total	Report
30 June	16:30	United States	3–0	Puerto Rico	25–12	25–16	25–16			75–44	P3

== Final standing ==
Rank	Team
1st place, gold medalist(s)	United States
2nd place, silver medalist(s)	Puerto Rico
3rd place, bronze medalist(s)	Dominican Republic
4	Canada
5	Mexico
6	Costa Rica
7	U.S. Virgin Islands
8	Suriname

== Individual awards ==
- Most valuable player
  - Brooklyn Deleye (USA)
- Best Spiker
  - Brooklyn Deleye (USA)
- Best Blockers
  - Krystal Eddy (ISV)
- Best setter
  - Ella Mcvittie (CAN)
- Best Opposite
  - Aylin Ravell (MEX)
- Best libero
  - Delaney Watson (CAN)
- Best receiver
  - Ramsey Gary (USA)
- Best digger
  - Delaney Watson (CAN)
- Best server
  - Ariana Rodríguez (DOM)
- Best scorer
  - Chareika Carrion (PUR)
