= 2026 Women's U21 NORCECA Pan American Cup =

2026 Women's Junior Pan-American Volleyball Cup

Tournament details
- Host country: United States
- Dates: 7–12 July 2026
- Teams: 8
- Venue: 1 (in Columbus, Ohio host cities)

Final positions
- Champions: United States (5th title)
- Runners-up: Canada
- Third place: Mexico

Tournament awards
- MVP: Campbell Flynn (USA)

The 2026 Women's U21 NORCECA Pan American Cup is the ninth edition of the Women's Junior Pan-American Volleyball Cup. Eight teams is participating in this edition held at the Covelli Center in Columbus, Ohio, United States.

The United States won their fourth consecutive and overall fifth title, after defeated Canada 3–0 in the final. Campbell Flynn of the United States won the Most Valuable Player award.

== Participating nations ==
Group A	Group B
Canada; Mexico; United States; Venezuela	Belize; Costa Rica; Dominican Republic; U.S. Virgin Islands

== Competition format ==
Eight teams will be divided into two pools. In the group stage each pool will play round robin. The first rank teams of each pool after group stage will receive byes into the semifinals. The second and third rank teams in each pool will play in the quarterfinals.

== Competition venue ==
All matches
Columbus, United States
Covelli Center
Capacity: 3,700
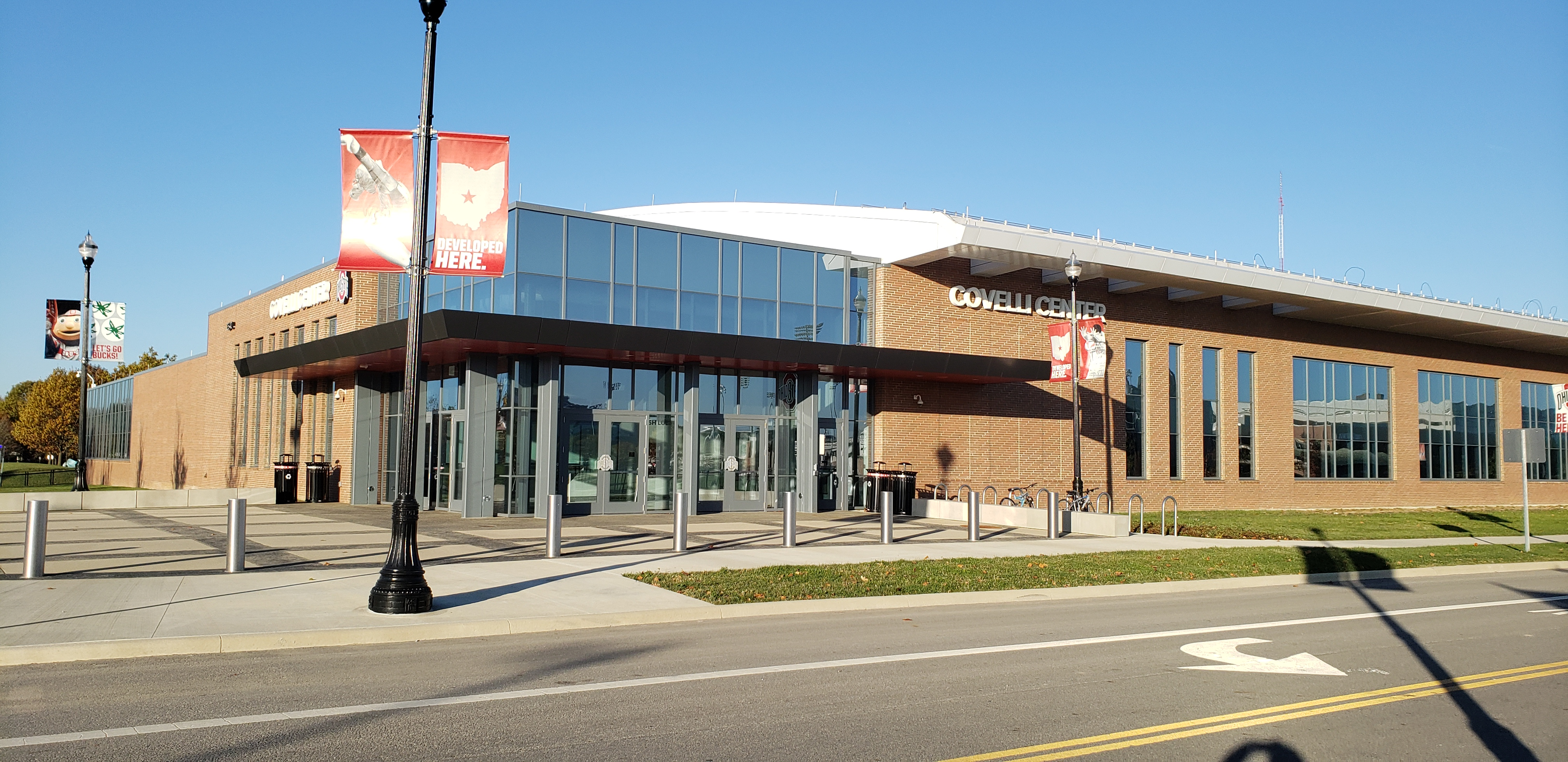

== Pool standing procedure ==
1. Number of matches won
2. Match points
3. Sets ratio
4. Points ratio
5. If the tie continues as per the point ratio between two teams, the priority will be given to the team which won the match between them. When the tie in points ratio is between three or more teams, a new classification of these teams in the terms of points 1, 2, 3 and 4 will be made taking into consideration only the matches in which they were opposed to each other.
- Match won 3–0 = 5 points
- Match won 3–1 = 4 points
- Match won 3–2 = 3 points
- Match lost 0–3 = 0 point
- Match lost 1–3 = 1 points
- Match lost 2–3 = 2 points
- Match forfeited = 0 points (0–25, 0–25, 0–25)

== Preliminary round ==
- All times are in local time (UTC−4)

=== Group A ===
Pos	Team	Pld	W	L	Pts	SPW	SPL	SPR	SW	SL	SR	Qualification
1	United States	3	3	0	14	246	181	1.359	9	1	9.000	Semifinals
2	Canada	3	2	1	9	257	253	1.016	7	5	1.400	Quarterfinals
3	Mexico	3	1	2	7	240	234	1.026	5	6	0.833	Quarterfinals
4	Venezuela	3	0	3	0	150	225	0.667	0	9	0.000	

Source: NORCECA

Date	Time		Score		Set 1	Set 2	Set 3	Set 4	Set 5	Total	Report
7 Jul	17:00	Canada	3–2	Mexico	25–19	18–25	21–25	25–23	18–16	107–108	P2P3
7 Jul	20:15	United States	3–0	Venezuela	25–13	25–21	25–15			75–49	P2P3
8 Jul	17:00	Canada	3–0	Venezuela	25–16	25–13	25–20			75–49	P2P3
8 Jul	19:00	United States	3–0	Mexico	25–21	25–18	25–18			75–57	P2P3
9 Jul	15:00	Venezuela	0–3	Mexico	16–25	17–25	19–25			52–75	P2P3
9 Jul	19:00	United States	3–1	Canada	25–18	25–14	21–25	25–18		96–75	P2P3

=== Group B ===
Pos	Team	Pld	W	L	Pts	SPW	SPL	SPR	SW	SL	SR	Qualification
1	Dominican Republic	3	3	0	14	249	175	1.423	9	1	9.000	Semifinals
2	Costa Rica	3	2	1	10	248	216	1.148	7	4	1.750	Quarterfinals
3	Belize	3	1	2	6	202	235	0.860	4	6	0.667	Quarterfinals
4	U.S. Virgin Islands	3	0	3	0	153	226	0.677	0	9	0.000	

Source: NORCECA

Date	Time		Score		Set 1	Set 2	Set 3	Set 4	Set 5	Total	Report
7 Jul	13:00	Dominican Republic	3–0	Belize	25–14	25–20	25–21			75–55	P2P3
7 Jul	15:00	Costa Rica	3–0	U.S. Virgin Islands	25–11	25–13	25–22			75–46	P2P3
8 Jul	13:00	Costa Rica	3–1	Belize	19–25	25–11	25–9	28–26		97–71	P2P3
8 Jul	15:00	Dominican Republic	3–0	U.S. Virgin Islands	25–17	25–17	25–10			75–44	P2P3
9 Jul	13:00	U.S. Virgin Islands	0–3	Belize	20–25	19–25	24–26			63–76	P2P3
9 Jul	17:00	Dominican Republic	3–1	Costa Rica	24–26	25–17	25–14	25–19		99–76	P2P3

== Final round ==
=== Championship bracket ===
Quarterfinals
A2	Canada	3
B3	Belize	0
B2	Costa Rica	0
A3	Mexico	3

Semifinals
B1	Dominican Republic	0
A2	Canada	3
A1	United States	3
A3	Mexico	0

Finals
A2	Canada	0
A1	United States	3
Third place
B1	Dominican Republic	2
A3	Mexico	3

==== Quarterfinals ====
Date	Time		Score		Set 1	Set 2	Set 3	Set 4	Set 5	Total	Report
10 Jul	17:00	Costa Rica	0–3	Mexico	12–25	16–25	19–25			47–75	P2P3
10 Jul	19:00	Canada	3–0	Belize	25–8	25–20	25–13			75–41	P2P3

==== Classification 5–8 ====
Date	Time		Score		Set 1	Set 2	Set 3	Set 4	Set 5	Total	Report
11 Jul	13:00	U.S. Virgin Islands	0–3	Costa Rica	17–25	15–25	16–25			48–75	P2P3
11 Jul	15:00	Venezuela	3–2	Belize	25–19	27–29	26–24	21–25	15–11	114–108	P2P3

==== Semifinals ====
Date	Time		Score		Set 1	Set 2	Set 3	Set 4	Set 5	Total	Report
11 Jul	17:00	Dominican Republic	0–3	Canada	8–25	14–25	22–25			44–75	P2P3
11 Jul	19:00	United States	3–0	Mexico	25–17	25–11	25–12			75–40	P2P3

===== 7th place match =====
Date	Time		Score		Set 1	Set 2	Set 3	Set 4	Set 5	Total	Report
12 Jul	13:00	U.S. Virgin Islands	0–3	Belize	14–25	16–25	18–25			48–75	P2P3

===== 5th place match =====
Date	Time		Score		Set 1	Set 2	Set 3	Set 4	Set 5	Total	Report
12 Jul	15:00	Costa Rica	3–1	Venezuela	25–22	17–25	25–17	25–18		92–82	P2P3

==== 3rd place match ====
Date	Time		Score		Set 1	Set 2	Set 3	Set 4	Set 5	Total	Report
12 Jul	17:00	Dominican Republic	2–3	Mexico	25–22	25–21	19–25	12–25	16–18	97–111	P2P3

==== Final ====
Date	Time		Score		Set 1	Set 2	Set 3	Set 4	Set 5	Total	Report
12 Jul	20:10	Canada	0–3	United States	18–25	19–25	21–25			58–75	P2P3

== Final standing ==
Rank	Team
1st place, gold medalist(s)	United States
2nd place, silver medalist(s)	Canada
3rd place, bronze medalist(s)	Mexico
4	Dominican Republic
5	Costa Rica
6	Venezuela
7	Belize
8	U.S. Virgin Islands

== Individual awards ==
- Most valuable player
  - Campbell Flynn (USA)
- Best scorer
  - Nhya Barley (CRC)
- Best setter
  - Avaya Maga (CAN)
- Best opposite
  - Nisaan Martínez (BIZ)
- Best spikers
  - María Venegas (CRC)
  - Payton Petersen (USA)
- Best middle blockers
  - Elizabeth Martínez (CRC)
  - Maya Bukovcan (CAN)
- Best libero
  - Rashell Easy Valverde (CRC)
- Best server
  - Maya Bukovcan (CAN)
- Best receiver
  - Rashell Easy Valverde (CRC)
- Best digger
  - Génesis Ottesse (DOM)
