= Chile U20 =

Chile U20 may refer to:

- Chile national under-20 football team
- Chile women's national under-20 football team
- Chile women's national under-20 volleyball team
