= 2021 FIVB Volleyball Women's U20 World Championship squads =

This article lists the international squads for the 2021 FIVB Women's U20 World Championship.

== Argentina ==
The following is the Argentina roster in the 2021 FIVB Volleyball Women's U20 World Championship.

Head coach: (Argentina) Pablo Martin Ambrosini

- 1 Nicole Dalma Pérez OH
- 2 Aylén Ayub S
- 3 Julieta Sández MB
- 4 Nayla Da Silva OP
- 5 Catalina Rochaix S
- 6 Julieta Aruga S
- 7 Valentina Paredes OS
- 8 Guadalupe Martín OS
- 9 Valentina Vaulet OP
- 10 Juana Giardini S
- 11 Bianca Cugno OP
- 12 Milena Margaria OH
- 13 Avril Garcia MB
- 14 Julieta Holzmaisters MB
- 15 Camila Giraudo OH
- 16 Keila Llanos OH
- 17 Agustina Campanella MB
- 18 Josefina Ossvald MB
- 19 Candela Yaccuzzi L
- 20 Victoria Caballero L

== Belarus ==
The following is the Belarus roster in the 2021 FIVB Volleyball Women's U20 World Championship.

Head coach: (Belarus) Volha Palcheuskaya

- 1 Liubou Svetnik OH
- 3 Anastasija Svetnik MB
- 4 Dziyana Vaskouskaya L
- 5 Kseniya Liabiodkina OH
- 6 Viktoryia Kastsiuchyk L
- 7 Hanna Karabinovich OP
- 8 Valeryia Turchyna OS
- 9 Darya Sauchuk MB
- 10 Anastasiya Shahun MB
- 11 Lizaveta Bahayeva S
- 12 Darya Borys OH
- 14 Darya Vakulka OP
- 16 Darya Burak MB
- 17 Marharyta Zakharanka S
- 27 Emilia Mikanovich OH

== Belgium ==
The following is the Belgium roster in the 2021 FIVB Volleyball Women's U20 World Championship.

Head coach: (Belgium) Callens Fien

- 1 Romane Neufkens S
- 2 Pauline Martin OP
- 3 Jana Thierens OH
- 4 Dauke Vreys OH
- 5 Annelore Engels S
- 6 Luna Van Acker S
- 7 Anna Koulberg MB
- 8 Lena Versteynen OH
- 9 Anouck Van Bouwel OH
- 10 Bente Deckers OH
- 11 Marie Lambrix L
- 12 Caitlin Van de Perre OH
- 13 Sarah Kustermans MB
- 15 Dorine Declat MB
- 16 Noor Debouck L
- 17 Anastasija Zecevic MB

== Brazil ==
The following is the Brazil roster in the 2021 FIVB Volleyball Women's U20 World Championship.

Head coach: (Brazil) Hairton Cabral De Oliveira

- 1 Istefani Dos Santos Silva S
- 2 Marcelle De Arruda Mattos Da Silva OH
- 3 Ana Cecília Aparecida Lopes OH
- 4 Jaqueline Schmitz OP
- 5 Stephany Gomes Xavier Morete OH
- 6 Kátia Larissa Machado Da Silva MB
- 7 Luiza Vicente Da Silva OH
- 8 Lívia Dos Santos Gomes Lima MB
- 9 Emily Da Silva Nunes MB
- 10 Emanuelle Dos Santos De Moura OP
- 11 Maria Clara Albrecht Carvalhães S
- 12 Carolina Grossi De Souza Santos OP
- 13 Gabriela Carneiro De Souza OP
- 14 Ana Cristina De Souza OH
- 15 Aline Kiatkowski Olegário MB
- 16 Isis Bortolaso Simonetti S
- 17 Gabriela Santin L
- 18 Ana Luiza Rüdiger OP
- 19 Amanda Santos Julião OH
- 20 Letícia Araújo Almeida Holanda Moura L

== Dominican Republic ==
The following is the Dominican Republic roster in the 2021 FIVB Volleyball Women's U20 World Championship.

Head coach: (Dominican Republic) Cristian Cruz Zapata

- 1 Flormarie Heredia OH
- 2 Laura Paniagua L
- 3 Yanelis Cabada OP
- 4 Erika Calderon Rosario MB
- 5 Sarah Angel Cruz OH
- 6 Leoneiry Cornelio OP
- 7 Perla de Jesús Aybar OH
- 8 Joeliza Fis S
- 9 Geraldine González MB
- 10 Cherlin Antonio OP
- 11 Leslie Jerez L
- 12 Ailyn Liberato S
- 13 Ariana Rodríguez S
- 14 Crismeily Rodríguez OH
- 18 Darlenys Olivo OP
- 19 Alanae Gonzalez MB
- 23 Esthefany Rabit MB
- 25 Romina Cornelio OH

== Egypt ==
The following is the Egypt roster in the 2021 FIVB Volleyball Women's U20 World Championship.

Head coach: (Egypt) Ahmed Fathy Mohamed

- 1 Nada Morgan MB
- 2 Loujayn Sadek S
- 3 Sama Mohamed OH
- 4 Malak Elbehiry OH
- 5 Mariam Bakr S
- 6 Farah Alaydy L
- 7 Salma Mahmoud OP
- 8 Sabine Ali OH
- 9 Habiba Zaatar L
- 10 Farida Elhenawy OH
- 11 Nour Ali OP
- 12 Nada Hamdy Samir Mahmoud Hamdy OP
- 13 Ayatallah Ahmed OP
- 14 May Abdelmaguid MB
- 16 Toqaallah Eassa MB
- 17 Ayah Elnady OH
- 18 Maha Zaki L
- 19 Malak Abdelaziz MB
- 20 Farida Ibrahim S

== Italy ==
The following is the Italy roster in the 2021 FIVB Volleyball Women's U20 World Championship.

Head coach: (Italy) Massimo Bellano

- 1 Anna Eniola Adelusi OH
- 2 Emma Graziani MB
- 3 Dominika Giuliani OH
- 4 Julia Ituma OH
- 5 Sofia Monza S
- 6 Gaia Guiducci S
- 7 Claudia Consoli MB
- 8 Maria Teresa Bassi OH
- 9 Loveth Omoruyi OH
- 10 Martina Armini L
- 11 Stella Nervini OH
- 12 Giorgia Frosini OP
- 13 Beatrice Gardini OH
- 14 Anna Pelloia S
- 15 Katja Eckl MB
- 16 Emma Cagnin OH
- 17 Linda Nkiruka Nwakalor MB
- 18 Binto Diop OP
- 19 Emma Barbero L
- 20 Islam Gannar MB

== Netherlands ==
The following is the Netherlands roster in the 2021 FIVB Volleyball Women's U20 World Championship.

Head coach: (Netherlands) Marko Klok

- 1 Kim Klein Lankhorst S
- 2 Romy Brokking L
- 3 Hyke Lyklema S
- 4 Jolien Knollema OH
- 5 Sanne Konijnenberg S
- 6 Marije Ten Brinke MB
- 7 Dagmar Mourits OH
- 8 Jette Kuipers OH
- 9 Britte Stuut MB
- 10 Iris Vos OH
- 11 Elles Dambrink OP
- 12 Pleun van der Pijl OH
- 14 Nicole Van De Vosse OP
- 15 Anneclaire ter Brugge MB
- 16 Jolijn De Haan OP
- 17 Noa de Vos OH
- 18 Puck Hoogers OH
- 20 Rixt van de Wal MB

== Poland ==
The following is the Poland roster in the 2021 FIVB Volleyball Women's U20 World Championship.

Head coach: (Poland) Wiesław Popik

- 1 Dominika Pierzchała MB
- 2 Magda Stambrowska MB
- 4 Martyna Leoniak OH
- 5 Martyna Borowczak OH
- 8 Julita Piasecka OH
- 10 Oliwia Laszczyk OH
- 11 Gabriela Lendzioszek OP
- 13 Sonia Stefanik MB
- 16 Julia Orzoł OH
- 17 Klaudia Łyduch L
- 18 Daria Skomorowska L
- 19 Katarzyna Hyży MB
- 20 Martyna Czyrniańska OH
- 21 Karolina Drużkowska OP
- 22 Katarzyna Partyka S
- 25 Justyna Jankowska MB
- 26 Rozalia Moszyńska MB
- 27 Martyna Łazowska S
- 98 Julia Bińczycka S

== Puerto Rico ==
The following is the Puerto Rico roster in the 2021 FIVB Volleyball Women's U20 World Championship.

Head coach: (Puerto Rico) Jose Ricardo Rivera Guinand

- 1 Valerie Garcia Irizarry S
- 2 Nahirka Malpica Vélez OH
- 3 Alondra Javier Feliciano OH
- 4 Ana Beatriz Fuertes Brito OP
- 5 Valeria Pagán Muñoz OH
- 6 María Verrier Núñez OH
- 7 Gabriela Machín Borges OP
- 8 Paola Martell Santiago MB
- 9 Yarianis Suarez Velazquez MB
- 10 Krystal Salgado Rodríguez MB
- 11 Yomarielis García Núñez L
- 12 Nayelis Cabello Cuevas S
- 14 Sara Pomar Domínguez S
- 15 Valeria Figueroa Estrada L
- 16 María José Vázquez Ramos OP
- 17 Karolina Rodríguez Méndez MB

== Russia ==
The following is the Russia roster in the 2021 FIVB Volleyball Women's U20 World Championship.

Head coach: (Russia) Igor Kurnosov

- 1 Elizaveta Kochurina MB
- 2 Valeriia Perova L
- 3 Tatiana Seliutina S
- 4 Polina Matveeva S
- 5 Anastasiia Chernova OP
- 6 Tatiana Kostina OH
- 7 Daria Zamanskaia OH
- 8 Vita Akimova OP
- 9 Elizaveta Popova S
- 10 Svetlana Gatina OP
- 11 Ksenia Menshchikova MB
- 12 Natalia Suvorova MB
- 14 Varvara Shubina L
- 15 Valeriia Gorbunova OP
- 16 Natalia Slautina MB
- 18 Viktoriia Kobzar S
- 19 Ekaterina Gatina OH
- 20 Yana Shelkovkina OH

== Rwanda ==
The following is the Rwanda roster in the 2021 FIVB Volleyball Women's U20 World Championship.

Head coach: (Rwanda) Christophe Mudahinyuka

- 3 Charlotte Mushimiyimana S
- 4 Diane Mpuhwezimana S
- 5 Adeline Mutanguha MB
- 6 Alianea Nirere OH
- 7 Jolie Mukazi MB
- 8 Yvonne Mugwaneza L
- 9 Solange Uwamariya OH
- 10 Albertine Uwiringiyimana MB
- 11 Aneth Kamaliza OH
- 12 Aloysie Tuyishime OH
- 13 Nancy Ndagijimana S
- 14 Hope Urwiririza OH

== Serbia ==
The following is the Serbia roster in the 2021 FIVB Volleyball Women's U20 World Championship.

Head coach: (Serbia) Vladimir Vasović

- 1 Andrea Tišma S
- 2 Nina Mandović S
- 3 Minja Osmajić OP
- 4 Bojana Gočanin L
- 5 Ana Drobnjak MB
- 6 Valerija Savicević MB
- 7 Aleksandra Uzelac OH
- 8 Dunja Grabić OH
- 9 Tijana Vrcelj S
- 10 Jovana Cvetkovic OH
- 11 Hena Kurtagić MB
- 12 Ana Malešević MB
- 13 Nevena Sajić OH
- 14 Vanja Savić OP
- 15 Isidora Kockarević OP
- 16 Jovana Ćirković OH
- 18 Branka Tica L
- 19 Stefana Pakić OH
- 21 Vanja Ivanović OH
- 23 Ksenija Tomić OH

== Thailand ==
The following is the Thailand roster in the 2021 FIVB Volleyball Women's U20 World Championship.

Head coach: (Thailand) Nataphon Srisamutnak

- 1 Wiranyupa Inchan OP
- 2 Kewalin Chuemuangphan OP
- 3 Amonrada Loeksawang MB
- 4 Sasiprapa Maneewong S
- 5 Wimonrat Thanapan MB
- 7 Aree Seemok MB
- 8 Naphat Rueangdet S
- 9 Jidapa Nahuanong L
- 10 Saowapha Soosuk MB
- 12 Pimtawan Thongyos OH
- 14 Kanyarat Kunmuang MB
- 15 Suphatcha Khamtrareaksa S
- 16 Waranya Srilaoong OP
- 17 Pajaree Maneesri OP
- 18 Tanawan Arunmuang S
- 19 Chanunya Kamolklang OP
- 20 Panatda Chaiyaphet OH
- 21 Thatdao Kanwitthayi OH

== Turkey ==
The following is the Turkey roster in the 2021 FIVB Volleyball Women's U20 World Championship.

Head coach: (Turkey) Sahin Catma

- 1 Tuna Aybüke Cetinay L
- 2 Sude Hacimustafaoğlu OP
- 3 Selin Adalı L
- 4 Karmen Aksoy MB
- 5 Çağla Salih S
- 7 Elif Su Eriçek OH
- 8 Hilal Kocakara S
- 10 Lila Şengün S
- 11 Hanife Nur Özaydinli MB
- 14 Sude Naz Uzun MB
- 15 İpar Özay Kurt OH
- 16 Damla Tokman MB
- 18 Aleyna Göçmen OP
- 19 Beren Yeşilırmak OP
- 20 Pelin Eroktay OP
- 21 Gülce Güçtekin L
- 23 Aybüke Güldenoğlu OH
- 26 Melisa Ege Bükmen OH
- 27 Miray Gözübüyük OH
- 32 Deniz Nazlican Zengin MB

== United States ==
The following is the United States' roster in the 2021 FIVB Volleyball Women's U20 World Championship.

Head coach: (United States) Dan Fisher

- 1 Lexi Rodriguez L
- 2 Hattie Monson L
- 3 Elena Oglivie OH
- 4 Sydney Reed L
- 5 Allison Jacobs OH
- 6 Kamerynn Miner S
- 7 Averi Carlson S
- 8 Anna Herrington MB
- 9 Sarah White S
- 10 Reagan Hope MB
- 11 Jordan Middleton OH
- 12 Caroline Crawford MB
- 13 Shaylee Shore MB OP
- 14 Emily Londot OP
- 15 Katelyn Smith OP
- 16 Gabrielle Essix MB
- 17 Lindsay Krause OH
- 18 Katherine Ryan OH
- 19 Allysa Batenhorst OH
- 20 Carter Booth MB
