= Argentina women's national under-21 volleyball team =

Youth volleyball team representing Argentina

Argentina
- Association: Federación del Voleibol Argentino
- Confederation: CSV

Uniforms
Home	Away

FIVB U21 World Championship
- Appearances: 10 (First in 1977)
- Best result: 7th place : (2001)

South America U20 Championship
- Appearances: 23 (First in 1972)
- Best result: (silver) Silver : (1992, 1994, 1996, 1998, 2000, 2004, 2006, 2016).
- feva.org.ar

The Argentina women's national under-20 volleyball team represents Argentina in women's under-20 volleyball events, it is controlled and managed by the Argentine Volleyball Federation that is a member of South American volleyball body Confederación Sudamericana de Voleibol (CSV) and the international volleyball body government the Fédération Internationale de Volleyball (FIVB).

== Results ==
=== FIVB U20 World Championship ===
Champions Runners up Third place Fourth place

FIVB U20 World Championship
Year	Round	Position	Pld	W	L	SW	SL	Squad
(Brazil) 1977		11th place						Squad
(Mexico) 1981		8th place						Squad
(Italy) 1985	Did not qualify							
(South Korea) 1987		11th place						Squad
(Peru) 1989		10th place						Squad
(Czechoslovakia) 1991		11th place						Squad
(Brazil) 1993		11th place						Squad
(Thailand) 1995	Did not qualify							
(Poland) 1997		13th place						Squad
(Canada) 1999		13th place						Squad
(Dominican Republic) 2001		7th place						Squad
(Thailand) 2003	Did not qualify							
(Turkey) 2005	Did not qualify							
(Thailand) 2007	Did not qualify							
(Mexico) 2009	Did not qualify							
(Peru) 2011	Did not qualify							
(Czech Republic) 2013	Did not qualify							
(Puerto Rico) 2015	Did not qualify							
(Mexico) 2017		12th place						Squad
(Mexico) 2019		11th place						Squad
(Belgium) (Netherlands) 2021		11th place						Squad
Total	0 Titles	12/21						

=== South America U20 Championship ===
Champions Runners up Third place Fourth place

South America U20 Championship
Year	Round	Position	GP	MW	ML	SW	SL	Squad
(Brazil) 1972		Third place						Squad
(Argentina) 1974		Third place						Squad
(Bolivia) 1976		Third place						Squad
(Brazil) 1978		Third place						Squad
(Chile) 1980		Third place						Squad
(Argentina) 1982		Third place						Squad
(Peru) 1984		4th place						Squad
(Brazil) 1986		Third place						Squad
(Venezuela) 1988		Third place						Squad
(Argentina) 1990		Third place						Squad
(Bolivia) 1992		Runners-Up						Squad
(Colombia) 1994		Runners-Up						Squad
(Venezuela) 1996		Runners-Up						Squad
(Argentina) 1998		Runners-Up						Squad
(Colombia) 2000		Runners-Up						Squad
(Bolivia) 2002		Third place						Squad
(Bolivia) 2004		Runners-Up						Squad
(Venezuela) 2006		Runners-Up						Squad
(Peru) 2008		4th place						Squad
(Colombia) 2010		5th place						Squad
(Peru) 2012		5th place						Squad
(Colombia) 2014		Third place						Squad
(Colombia) 2016		Runners-Up						Squad
(Peru) 2018		Runners-Up						Squad
Total	0 Titles	24/24	—	—	—	—	—	—

=== Pan-American U20 Cup ===
Champions Runners up Third place Fourth place

Pan-American U20 Cup
Year	Round	Position	Pld	W	L	SW	SL	Squad
(Peru) 2011	Withdrew							
(Cuba) 2013	Did not compete							
(Dominican Republic) 2015	Final	Runners-Up						Squad
(Costa Rica) 2017	Final	Runners-Up						Squad
Total	0 Titles	2/4						

== Current squad ==
The following is the Argentine roster in the 2017 FIVB Volleyball Women's U20 World Championship.

Head Coach: Guillermo Caceres

No.	Name	Date of birth	Height	Weight	Spike	Block	2017 club
1	Valentina Gonzalez	23 February 1998	1.63 m (5 ft 4 in)	56 kg (123 lb)	271 cm (107 in)	260 cm (100 in)	(Argentina) 9 De Julio – Freyre
3	Greta Martinelli	29 April 1998	1.79 m (5 ft 10 in)	67 kg (148 lb)	280 cm (110 in)	269 cm (106 in)	(Argentina) Vélez Sársfield
4	Agustina Oliva	24 September 1998	1.84 m (6 ft 0 in)	72 kg (159 lb)	295 cm (116 in)	284 cm (112 in)	(Argentina) River Plate
7	Azul Benítez (C)	5 February 1998	1.69 m (5 ft 7 in)	57 kg (126 lb)	272 cm (107 in)	263 cm (104 in)	(Argentina) Mar Chiquita
8	Daniela Nielson	7 November 1998	1.70 m (5 ft 7 in)	57 kg (126 lb)	278 cm (109 in)	266 cm (105 in)	(Argentina) Universidad de San Juan
9	Anahi Tosi	19 February 1998	1.83 m (6 ft 0 in)	60 kg (130 lb)	290 cm (110 in)	272 cm (107 in)	(Argentina) 9 De Julio – Freyre
10	Candela Nota	1 March 1999	1.82 m (6 ft 0 in)	60 kg (130 lb)	280 cm (110 in)	271 cm (107 in)	(Argentina) Union San Guillermo
12	Agostina Soria	9 October 1998	1.80 m (5 ft 11 in)	65 kg (143 lb)	279 cm (110 in)	273 cm (107 in)	(Argentina) Vélez Sársfield
13	Julieta Cervini	13 March 1999	1.82 m (6 ft 0 in)	69 kg (152 lb)	283 cm (111 in)	269 cm (106 in)	(Argentina) Vélez Sársfield
14	Agostina Beltramino	25 April 1999	1.81 m (5 ft 11 in)	65 kg (143 lb)	283 cm (111 in)	283 cm (111 in)	(Argentina) Provincial – Rosario
16	Maria Pelozo	19 November 1999	1.80 m (5 ft 11 in)	56 kg (123 lb)	277 cm (109 in)	263 cm (104 in)	(Argentina) Fisherton
18	Fiamma Biain	31 January 1998	1.73 m (5 ft 8 in)	67 kg (148 lb)	279 cm (110 in)	266 cm (105 in)	(Argentina) Union San Guillermo
