= Women's Junior Pan-American Volleyball Cup =

Recurring volleyball competition

- Current season, competition or edition: 2026 Women's U21 NORCECA Pan American Cup
- Sport: Volleyball
- Founded: 2011; 15 years ago
- First season: 2011
- No. of teams: 8
- Continent: Pan American (NORCECA)
- Most recent champions: United States (5th title)
- Most titles: United States (5 titles)

The Women's Junior Pan-American Volleyball Cup is a bi-annual Continental Cup organized by NORCECA for U21 teams from all over America (North-, South- and Central America, and the Caribbean).

== History ==
Pan-American Cup
Year	Host	Champion	Runner-up	3rd Place
2011; Details	Callao, Peru	Peru	Dominican Republic	Cuba
2013; Details	La Habana, Cuba	Mexico	Dominican Republic	Colombia
2015; Details	(Dominican Republic); Santo Domingo, República Dominicana	Dominican Republic	Argentina	Chile
2017; Details	San Jose, Costa Rica	United States	Argentina	Cuba
2019; Details	Lima, Peru	Cuba	Dominican Republic	Peru
2022; Details	Baja California Sur, Mexico	United States	Argentina	Mexico
2023; Details	Nogales, Mexico	United States	Mexico	Cuba
2025; Details	San José, Costa Rica	United States	Chile	Costa Rica
2026; Details	Columbus, United States	United States	Canada	Mexico

== Medal table ==
Rank	Nation	Gold	Silver	Bronze	Total
1	United States	5	0	0	5
2	Dominican Republic	1	3	0	4
3	Mexico	1	1	2	4
4	Cuba	1	0	3	4
5	Peru	1	0	1	2
6	Argentina	0	3	0	3
7	Chile	0	1	1	2
8	Canada	0	1	0	1
9	Colombia	0	0	1	1
9	Costa Rica	0	0	1	1
Totals (10 entries)		9	9	9	27

== Participating nations ==
Nation	(Peru) 2011	(Cuba) 2013	(Dominican Republic) 2015	(Costa Rica) 2017	(Peru) 2019	(Mexico) 2022	(Mexico) 2023	(Costa Rica) 2025	(United States) 2026	Years
Argentina	–	–	2nd	2nd	–	2nd	–	–	–	3
Belize	–	–	–	–	–	–	8th	–	7th	2
Canada	–	–	–	–	–	7th	–	4th	2nd	3
Chile	–	7th	3rd	8th	5th	4th	–	2nd	–	6
Colombia	–	3rd	–	–	–	–	–	–	–	1
Costa Rica	6th	8th	5th	9th	–	9th	6th	3rd	5th	8
Cuba	3rd	6th	–	3rd	1st	5th	3rd	–	–	6
Dominican Republic	2nd	2nd	1st	7th	2nd	8th	4th	5th	4th	9
El Salvador	7th	–	–	–	–	–	–	–	–	1
Guatemala	–	–	–	–	7th	–	7th	–	–	2
Honduras	–	–	–	–	6th	10th	–	–	–	2
Mexico	4th	1st	4th	–	–	3rd	2nd	7th	3rd	7
Nicaragua	–	–	6th	–	–	–	–	–	–	1
Peru	1st	4th	–	5th	3rd	–	–	–	–	4
Puerto Rico	–	5th	–	4th	4th	6th	5th	6th	–	6
U.S. Virgin Islands	–	–	–	–	–	–	–	–	8th	1
United States	–	–	–	1st	–	1st	1st	1st	1st	5
Uruguay	–	–	–	6th	–	–	–	–	–	1
Venezuela	5th	–	–	–	–	–	–	–	6th	2

== Most valuable player by edition ==
- 2011 – (Peru) Daniela Uribe
- 2013 – (Mexico) Alejandra Isiordia
- 2015 – (Dominican Republic) Gaila González
- 2017 – (United States) Thayer Hall
- 2019 – (Cuba) Ailama Cese
- 2022 – (United States) Merrit Beason
- 2023 – (United States) Cloe Chicoine
- 2025 – (United States) Brooklyn Deleye
- 2026 – (United States) Campbell Flynn

== See also ==
- Women's Pan-American Volleyball Cup
- Women's U23 Pan-American Volleyball Cup
- Girls' Youth Pan-American Volleyball Cup
- Men's Junior Pan-American Volleyball Cup
