= Chile women's national under-21 volleyball team =

Youth volleyball team representing Chile

Chile
- Association: Chilean Volleyball Federation
- Confederation: CSV

Uniforms
Home	Away

FIVB U21 World Championship
- Appearances: 1 (First in 2025)
- Best result: TBD

South America U20 Championship
- Appearances: 15 (First in 1972)
- Best result: 4th Place : (1972, 1980, 1982, 2012, 2014).

The Chile women's national under-20 volleyball team represents Chile in women's under-20 volleyball Events, it is controlled and managed by the Chilean Volleyball Federation that is a member of South American volleyball body Confederación Sudamericana de Voleibol (CSV) and the international volleyball body government the Fédération Internationale de Volleyball (FIVB).

== Results ==
=== FIVB U20 World Championship ===
Champions Runners up Third place Fourth place

FIVB U20 World Championship
Year	Round	Position	Pld	W	L	SW	SL	Squad
(Brazil) 1977	Didn't qualify							
(Mexico) 1981	Didn't qualify							
(Italy) 1985	Didn't qualify							
(South Korea) 1987	Didn't qualify							
(Peru) 1989	Didn't qualify							
(Czechoslovakia) 1991	Didn't qualify							
(Brazil) 1993	Didn't qualify							
(Thailand) 1995	Didn't qualify							
(Poland) 1997	Didn't qualify							
(Canada) 1999	Didn't qualify							
(Dominican Republic) 2001	Didn't qualify							
(Thailand) 2003	Didn't qualify							
(Turkey) 2005	Didn't qualify							
(Thailand) 2007	Didn't qualify							
(Mexico) 2009	Didn't qualify							
(Peru) 2011	Didn't qualify							
(Czech Republic) 2013	Didn't qualify							
(Puerto Rico) 2015	Didn't qualify							
(Mexico) 2017	Didn't qualify							
Total	0 Titles	0/19						

=== South America U20 Championship ===
Champions Runners up Third place Fourth place

South America U20 Championship
Year	Round	Position	GP	MW	ML	SW	SL	Squad
(Brazil) 1972		4th place						Squad
(Argentina) 1974		7th place						Squad
(Bolivia) 1976	Didn't enter							
(Brazil) 1978		5th place						Squad
(Chile) 1980		4th place						Squad
(Argentina) 1982		4th place						Squad
(Peru) 1984		6th place						Squad
(Brazil) 1986	Didn't enter							
(Venezuela) 1988		6th place						Squad
(Argentina) 1990	Didn't enter							
(Bolivia) 1992	Didn't enter							
(Colombia) 1994	Didn't enter							
(Venezuela) 1996		7th place						Squad
(Argentina) 1998		7th place						Squad
(Colombia) 2000	Didn't enter							
(Bolivia) 2002		6th place						Squad
(Bolivia) 2004	Didn't enter							
(Venezuela) 2006	Didn't enter							
(Peru) 2008		7th place						Squad
(Colombia) 2010		6th place						Squad
(Peru) 2012		4th place						Squad
(Colombia) 2014		4th place						Squad
(Colombia) 2016		5th place						Squad
Total	0 Titles	15/23	—	—	—	—	—	—

=== Pan-American U20 Cup ===
Champions Runners up Third place Fourth place

Pan-American U20 Cup
Year	Round	Position	Pld	W	L	SW	SL	Squad
(Peru) 2011	Didn't enter							
(Cuba) 2013		7th place						Squad
(Dominican Republic) 2015		4th place						Squad
(Costa Rica) 2017		8th place						Squad
Total	0 Titles	3/4						
