= 2010 Women's Junior NORCECA Volleyball Championship =

Tournament details
- Host country: Mexico
- Dates: July 4–12, 2010
- Teams: 10
- Venue: 1 (in Tijuana host cities)

Final positions
- Champions: United States (5th title)

Tournament awards
- MVP: Jane Croson (USA)

The 2010 Girls' Youth NORCECA Volleyball Championship was the seventh edition of the bi-annual Women's Junior NORCECA Volleyball Championship, played by ten countries from July 4–12, 2010 in Tijuana, Mexico. The United States defeated the Dominican Republic and qualified for the 2011 Women's Junior World Championship. The American Jane Croson won the tournament MVP.

== Competing nations ==
Group A	Group B	Group C
Dominican Republic; Canada; Costa Rica	Cuba; Puerto Rico; Trinidad and Tobago	United States; Mexico; El Salvador; Guadeloupe

== Pool standing procedure ==
Match won: 2 points
Match lost: 1 point
Match forfeited: 0 point
In case of tie, the teams were classified according to the following criteria:
points ratio and sets ratio

== First round ==
All times are PST, Pacific Standard Time (UTC−08:00)

=== Group A ===
Pos	Team	Pld	W	L	Pts	SW	SL	SR	SPW	SPL	SPR	Qualification
1	Dominican Republic	2	2	0	4	6	1	6.000	167	104	1.606	Semifinals
2	Canada	2	1	1	3	4	3	1.333	154	155	0.994	Quarterfinals
3	Costa Rica	2	0	2	2	0	6	0.000	89	151	0.589	7th to 9th qualification

Date	Time		Score		Set 1	Set 2	Set 3	Set 4	Set 5	Total	Report
5-JULY	17:00	Costa Rica	0–3	Canada	24-26	18-25	21-25			63–0	P2[ P3]
6-JULY	15:00	Dominican Republic	3–0	Costa Rica	25-12	25-8	25-6			75–0	P2[ P3]
7-JULY	15:00	Canada	1–3	Dominican Republic	25-17	12-25	18-25	23-25		78–0	P2[ P3]

=== Group B ===
Pos	Team	Pld	W	L	Pts	SW	SL	SR	SPW	SPL	SPR	Qualification
1	Cuba	2	2	0	4	6	0	MAX	150	89	1.685	Semifinals
2	Puerto Rico	2	1	1	3	3	3	1.000	133	114	1.167	Quarterfinals
3	Trinidad and Tobago	2	0	2	2	0	6	0.000	70	150	0.467	7th to 9th qualification

Date	Time		Score		Set 1	Set 2	Set 3	Set 4	Set 5	Total	Report
5-JULY	15:00	Puerto Rico	3–0	Trinidad and Tobago	25-10	25-9	25-20			75–0	P2[ P3]
6-JULY	13:00	Trinidad and Tobago	0–3	Cuba	8-25	10-25	13-25			31–0	P2[ P3]
7-JULY	17:00	Cuba	3–0	Puerto Rico	25-17	25-19	25-22			75–0	P2[ P3]

=== Group C ===
Pos	Team	Pld	W	L	Pts	SW	SL	SR	SPW	SPL	SPR	Qualification
1	United States	3	3	0	6	9	0	MAX	225	98	2.296	Semifinals
2	Mexico	3	2	1	5	6	3	2.000	208	128	1.625	Quarterfinals
3	El Salvador	3	1	2	4	3	7	0.429	147	243	0.605	7th to 9th qualification
4	Guadeloupe	3	0	3	3	1	9	0.111	139	250	0.556	7th to 9th qualification

Date	Time		Score		Set 1	Set 2	Set 3	Set 4	Set 5	Total	Report
5-JULY	19:00	Mexico	3–0	Guadeloupe	25-6	25-11	25-8			75–0	P2[ P3]
5-JULY	10:00	United States	3–0	El Salvador	25-8	25-4	25-7			75–0	P2[ P3]
6-JULY	17:00	Guadeloupe	0–3	United States	8-25	7-25	6-25			21–0	P2[ P3]
6-JULY	19:00	El Salvador	0–3	Mexico	13-25	7-25	8-25			28–0	P2[ P3]
7-JULY	13:00	Guadeloupe	1–3	El Salvador	26-28	25-22	22-25	20-25		93–0	P2[ P3]
7-JULY	19:00	Mexico	0–3	United States	19-25	16-25	23-25			58–0	P2[ P3]

== Final round ==
=== Championship bracket ===
Quarterfinals
A1	Dominican Republic	3
A2	Canada	0
B2	Puerto Rico	1
C2	Mexico	3

Semifinals
A1	Dominican Republic	3
B1	Cuba	1
C1	United States	3
C2	Mexico	0

Finals
A1	Dominican Republic	0
C1	United States	3
Third place
B1	Cuba	3
C2	Mexico	0

=== Classification 7/10 ===
Date	Time		Score		Set 1	Set 2	Set 3	Set 4	Set 5	Total	Report
8-JULY	13:00	Guadeloupe	0–3	El Salvador	14-25	21-25	17-25			52–0	P2
8-JULY	15:00	Costa Rica	3–0	Trinidad and Tobago	25-19	25-17	25-19			75–0	P2

=== Quarterfinals ===
Date	Time		Score		Set 1	Set 2	Set 3	Set 4	Set 5	Total	Report
8-JULY	17:00	Dominican Republic	3–0	Canada	25-22	25-18	25-15			75–0	P2
8-JULY	19:00	Puerto Rico	1–3	Mexico	21-25	26-28	25-23	8-25		80–0	P2

=== Classifications 7-8 & 9-10 ===
Date	Time		Score		Set 1	Set 2	Set 3	Set 4	Set 5	Total	Report
9-JULY	13:00	Guadeloupe	0–3	Trinidad and Tobago	21-25	18-25	23-25			62–0	P2
9-JULY	15:00	El Salvador	0–3	Costa Rica	13-25	12-25	25-27			50–0	P2

=== Semifinals ===
Date	Time		Score		Set 1	Set 2	Set 3	Set 4	Set 5	Total	Report
9-JULY	17:00	Cuba	1–3	Dominican Republic	17-25	21-25	25-14	16-25		79–0	P2
9-JULY	19:00	United States	3–0	Mexico	25-19	25-14	25-14			75–0	P2

=== 5th place match ===
Date	Time		Score		Set 1	Set 2	Set 3	Set 4	Set 5	Total	Report
10-JULY	15:00	Canada	0–3	Puerto Rico	18-25	24-26	19-25			61–0	P2

=== 3rd place match ===
Date	Time		Score		Set 1	Set 2	Set 3	Set 4	Set 5	Total	Report
10-JULY	17:00	Cuba	3–0	Mexico	25-20	25-19	25-21			75–0	P2

=== Final ===
Date	Time		Score		Set 1	Set 2	Set 3	Set 4	Set 5	Total	Report
10-JULY	19:00	Dominican Republic	0–3	United States	22-25	20-25	20-25			62–0	P2

== Final standing ==
Rank	Team
1st place, gold medalist(s)	United States
2nd place, silver medalist(s)	Dominican Republic
3rd place, bronze medalist(s)	Cuba
4	Mexico
5	Puerto Rico
6	Canada
7	Costa Rica
8	El Salvador
9	Trinidad and Tobago
10	Guadeloupe

Qualified for the 2011 World Junior Championship

2010 Women's Junior NORCECA Volleyball Championship

United States
5th title

== Individual awards ==
- Most valuable player
  - Jane Croson (USA)
- Best scorer
  - Ana Yorkira Binet (DOM)
- Best spiker
  - Jane Croson (USA)
- Best blocker
  - Haleigh Hampton (USA)
- Best server
  - Marisha Herbert (TTO)
- Best digger
  - Brenda Castillo (DOM)
- Best setter
  - Gabriela Reyes (CUB)
- Best receiver
  - Brenda Castillo (DOM)
- Best libero
  - Brenda Castillo (DOM)
