= Cecília Menezes =

Brazilian volleyball player (born 1982)

Cecília Menezes de Souza

Personal information
- Nickname: Ciça
- Nationality: Brazilian
- Born: 1 February 1982 (age 44)
- Hometown: Rio de Janeiro
- Height: 1.81 m (5 ft 11 in)
- Weight: 68 kg (150 lb)
- Spike: 305 cm (120 in)
- Block: 288 cm (113 in)

Volleyball information
- Position: Middle-blocker
- Current club: E. C. Pinheiros
- Number: 7 (national team)

National team
1995-2002	Brazil

Cecília Menezes de Souza (born 1 February 1982) is a Brazilian indoor volleyball player.

She was part of the Brazil women's national volleyball team at the 2002 FIVB Volleyball Women's World Championship in Germany.

In clubs, she played for E. C. Pinheiros and won a bronze medal at the 2007 Salonas Cup International Tournament.
