= 2001 FIVB Volleyball Women's U20 World Championship =

2001 FIVB Women's U20 World Championship
Tournament details
- Host country: Dominican Republic
- Dates: September 1–9, 2001
- Teams: 16
- Venue: 1 (in Santo Domingo host cities)

Final positions
- Champions: Brazil (3rd title)

Tournament awards
- MVP: (Brazil) Jaqueline Carvalho

The 2001 FIVB Women's U20 World Championship was held in Santo Domingo, Dominican Republic from September 1 to 9, 2001. 16 teams participated in the tournament.

== Qualification process ==
Confederation	Method of Qualification	Date	Venue	Vacancies	Qualified
FIVB	Host			1	Dominican Republic
NORCECA	2000 NORCECA Junior Championship	August 3–11, 2000	Havana, Cuba	2	Cuba; United States
CEV	2000 European Junior Championship	August 5–12, 2000	Neuchâtel, Switzerland	1	Czech Republic
AVC	2000 Asian Junior Championship	September 12–17, 2000	Dagupan, Philippines	3	China; South Korea; Chinese Taipei*
CSV	2000 South American Junior Championship	October 5–10, 2000	Medellín, Colombia	3	Brazil; Argentina; Venezuela
CAVB	African election			1	Algeria
CEV	2001 Women's Junior European Volleyball Championship Qualification	May 24–27, 2001	Osijek, Croatia	5	Italy; Croatia**
CEV	2001 Women's Junior European Volleyball Championship Qualification	May 24–27, 2001	Spala, Poland	5	Poland
CEV	2001 Women's Junior European Volleyball Championship Qualification	May 24–27, 2001	Moscow, Russia	5	Turkey
CEV	2001 Women's Junior European Volleyball Championship Qualification	May 24–27, 2001	Schwerin, Germany	5	Germany
Total				16	

- * Chinese Taipei replaced Japan.
- ** Croatia qualified as the best second place of the 2001 Women's Junior European Volleyball Championship Qualification's groups.

== Pools composition ==
Pool A	Pool B	Pool C	Pool D
Italy; Algeria; Dominican Republic; Venezuela	Croatia; Argentina; Cuba; Turkey	Germany; Brazil; Czech Republic; United States	China; South Korea; Poland; Chinese Taipei

== Preliminary round ==
=== Pool A ===
Pos	Team	Pld	W	L	Pts	SW	SL	SR	SPW	SPL	SPR	Qualification
1	Italy	3	3	0	6	9	0	MAX	225	120	1.875	Second round
2	Dominican Republic	3	2	1	5	6	4	1.500	215	209	1.029	Second round
3	Algeria	3	1	2	4	3	7	0.429	163	229	0.712	Second round
4	Venezuela	3	0	3	3	2	9	0.222	208	253	0.822	13th place

Date		Score		Set 1	Set 2	Set 3	Set 4	Set 5	Total
1 Sep	Italy	3–0	Venezuela	25–14	25–15	25–18			75–47
1 Sep	Dominican Republic	3–0	Algeria	25–16	25–16	25–20			75–52
2 Sep	Algeria	3–1	Venezuela	10–25	25–20	25–13	25–21		85–79
2 Sep	Dominican Republic	0–3	Italy	17–25	19–25	11–25			47–75
3 Sep	Italy	3–0	Algeria	25–7	25–13	25–6			75–26
3 Sep	Venezuela	1–3	Dominican Republic	19–25	17–25	25–18	21–25		82–93

=== Pool B ===
Pos	Team	Pld	W	L	Pts	SW	SL	SR	SPW	SPL	SPR	Qualification
1	Turkey	3	3	0	6	9	4	2.250	289	274	1.055	Second round
2	Croatia	3	2	1	5	8	5	1.600	299	265	1.128	Second round
3	Argentina	3	1	2	4	4	8	0.500	239	270	0.885	Second round
4	Cuba	3	0	3	3	5	9	0.556	294	312	0.942	13th place

Date		Score		Set 1	Set 2	Set 3	Set 4	Set 5	Total
1 Sep	Croatia	3–1	Argentina	20–25	25–12	25–17	25–21		95–75
1 Sep	Cuba	2–3	Turkey	25–19	25–22	23–25	26–28	10–15	109–109
2 Sep	Turkey	3–0	Argentina	25–18	25–19	25–22			75–59
2 Sep	Cuba	1–3	Croatia	23–25	22–25	25–23	15–25		85–98
3 Sep	Croatia	2–3	Turkey	24–26	25–17	19–25	25–22	13–15	106–105
3 Sep	Argentina	3–2	Cuba	25–23	23–25	17–25	25–16	15–11	105–100

=== Pool C ===
Pos	Team	Pld	W	L	Pts	SW	SL	SR	SPW	SPL	SPR	Qualification
1	Brazil	3	3	0	6	9	0	MAX	225	149	1.510	Second round
2	Germany	3	2	1	5	6	5	1.200	232	223	1.040	Second round
3	Czech Republic	3	1	2	4	5	6	0.833	223	218	1.023	Second round
4	United States	3	0	3	3	0	9	0.000	135	225	0.600	13th place

Date		Score		Set 1	Set 2	Set 3	Set 4	Set 5	Total
1 Sep	United States	0–3	Czech Republic	8–25	21–25	12–25			41–75
1 Sep	Germany	0–3	Brazil	18–25	18–25	19–25			55–75
2 Sep	Czech Republic	2–3	Germany	20–25	18–25	25–13	26–24	12–15	101–102
2 Sep	United States	0–3	Brazil	9–25	16–25	22–25			47–75
3 Sep	Germany	3–0	United States	25–13	25–19	25–15			75–47
3 Sep	Brazil	3–0	Czech Republic	25–20	25–15	25–12			75–47

=== Pool D ===
Pos	Team	Pld	W	L	Pts	SW	SL	SR	SPW	SPL	SPR	Qualification
1	China	3	3	0	6	9	0	MAX	225	155	1.452	Second round
2	South Korea	3	2	1	5	6	3	2.000	202	180	1.122	Second round
3	Chinese Taipei	3	1	2	4	3	6	0.500	183	197	0.929	Second round
4	Poland	3	0	3	3	0	9	0.000	147	225	0.653	13th place

Date		Score		Set 1	Set 2	Set 3	Set 4	Set 5	Total
1 Sep	China	3–0	Poland	25–9	25–21	25–16			75–46
1 Sep	South Korea	3–0	Chinese Taipei	25–21	25–19	25–11			75–51
2 Sep	China	3–0	Chinese Taipei	25–17	25–19	25–21			75–57
2 Sep	Poland	0–3	South Korea	19–25	14–25	21–25			54–75
3 Sep	Chinese Taipei	3–0	Poland	25–13	25–14	25–20			75–47
3 Sep	South Korea	0–3	China	18–25	11–25	23–25			52–75

== Second round ==
=== Play off – elimination group ===
Date		Score		Set 1	Set 2	Set 3	Set 4	Set 5	Total
Sep 5	Czech Republic	2–3	South Korea	27–25	25–21	28–30	18–25	10–15	108–116
Sep 5	Germany	2–3	Chinese Taipei	25–20	25–19	21–25	23–25	11–15	105–104
Sep 5	Algeria	0–3	Croatia	15–25	14–25	17–25			46–75
Sep 5	Dominican Republic	0–3	Argentina	26–28	22–25	18–25			66–78

=== Play off – seeding group ===
Date		Score		Set 1	Set 2	Set 3	Set 4	Set 5	Total
Sep 5	China	3–1	Turkey	25–16	23–25	25–13	25–15		98–69
Sep 5	Italy	3–2	Brazil	25–27	18–25	25–20	25–23	18–16	111–111

== Final round ==
Quarterfinals
September 7 – Santo Domingo
Turkey	2
South Korea	3
September 7 – Santo Domingo
Chinese Taipei	0
Italy	3
September 7 – Santo Domingo
China	3
Croatia	0
September 7 – Santo Domingo
Argentina	0
Brazil	3

Semifinals
September 8 – Santo Domingo
South Korea	3
Italy	1
September 8 – Santo Domingo
China	2
Brazil	3

Final
September 9 – Santo Domingo
South Korea	0
Brazil	3
3rd place
September 9 – Santo Domingo
Italy	0
China	3

5th–8th places
September 8 – Santo Domingo
Turkey	0
Chinese Taipei	3
September 8 – Santo Domingo
Croatia	3
Argentina	1

5th place
September 9 – Santo Domingo
Chinese Taipei	0
Croatia	3
7th place
September 9 – Santo Domingo
Argentina	3
Turkey	0

=== Quarterfinals ===
Date		Score		Set 1	Set 2	Set 3	Set 4	Set 5	Total
Sep 7	Turkey	2–3	South Korea	25–21	19–25	22–25	25–20	11–15	102–106
Sep 7	Chinese Taipei	0–3	Italy	23–25	20–25	17–25			60–75
Sep 7	China	3–0	Croatia	25–22	25–18	25–16			75–56
Sep 7	Argentina	0–3	Brazil	19–25	18–25	13–25			50–75

=== 5th–8th semifinals ===
Date		Score		Set 1	Set 2	Set 3	Set 4	Set 5	Total
Sep 8	Croatia	3–1	Argentina	25–22	23–25	25–20	25–23		98–90
Sep 8	Turkey	0–3	Chinese Taipei	19–25	11–25	23–25			53–75

=== Semifinals ===
Date		Score		Set 1	Set 2	Set 3	Set 4	Set 5	Total
Sep 8	China	2–3	Brazil	22–25	25–18	21–25	25–23	8–15	101–106
Sep 8	South Korea	3–1	Italy	17–25	25–22	25–22	30–28		97–97

=== 7th place ===
Date		Score		Set 1	Set 2	Set 3	Set 4	Set 5	Total
Sep 9	Argentina	3–0	Turkey	25–23	25–16	27–25			77–64

=== 5th place ===
Date		Score		Set 1	Set 2	Set 3	Set 4	Set 5	Total
Sep 9	Croatia	3–0	Chinese Taipei	25–15	25–15	25–21			75–51

=== 3rd place ===
Date		Score		Set 1	Set 2	Set 3	Set 4	Set 5	Total
Sep 9	Italy	0–3	China	24–26	22–25	22–25			68–76

=== Final ===
Date		Score		Set 1	Set 2	Set 3	Set 4	Set 5	Total
Sep 9	Brazil	3–0	South Korea	25–16	25–18	25–13			75–47

== Final standing ==
Rank	Team
1st place, gold medalist(s)	Brazil
2nd place, silver medalist(s)	South Korea
3rd place, bronze medalist(s)	China
4	Italy
5	Croatia
6	Chinese Taipei
7	Argentina
8	Turkey
9	Algeria
9	Czech Republic
9	Dominican Republic
9	Germany
13	Cuba
13	Poland
13	United States
13	Venezuela

2001 FIVB Women's Junior World champions

Brazil
3rd title

12–woman Roster
Juliana Costa, Paula Barros, Fabíola de Souza, Paula Pequeno, Ana Cristina Porto, Cecília Menezes, Veridiana Fonseca, Welissa Gonzaga, Juliana Saracuza, Jaqueline Carvalho, Andréia Laurence and Sheilla Castro
Head coach
Antonio Rizola

== Individual awards ==
- MVP: (Brazil) Jaqueline Carvalho
- Best scorer: (South Korea) Han Yoo-Mi
- Best spiker: (China) Zhang Ping
- Best blocker: (Croatia) Dragana Marinkovic
- Best server: (Italy) Francesca Ferretti
- Best setter: (China) Zhou Yuenan
- Best receiver: (Chinese Taipei) Liu Li Frang
- Best digger: (Argentina) Sandra Ferrero
- Best libero: (Italy) Ramona Puerari
