= Puerto Rico women's national under-21 volleyball team =

Puerto Rico
- Association: Puerto Rican Volleyball Federation
- Confederation: NORCECA

Uniforms
Home	Away	Third

FIVB U21 World Championship
- Appearances: 8 (First in 1981)
- Best result: 8th Place : (2005)

NORCECA U20 Championship
- Appearances: 8 (First in 1998)
- Best result: (gold) Gold : (2002)

The Puerto Rico women's national under-20 volleyball team represents Puerto Rico in international women's volleyball competitions and friendly matches under the age 20 and it is ruled by the Puerto Rican Volleyball Federation That Follow the North, Central America and Caribbean Volleyball Confederation NORCECA and also is a part of The Federation of International Volleyball FIVB.

== Results ==
=== FIVB U20 World Championship ===
Champions Runners up Third place Fourth place

FIVB U20 World Championship
Year	Round	Position	Pld	W	L	SW	SL	Squad
(Brazil) 1977	Didn't Enter							
(Mexico) 1981		14th place						Squad
(Italy) 1985	Didn't Qualify							
(South Korea) 1987		13th place						Squad
(Peru) 1989		15th place						Squad
(Czechoslovakia) 1991	Didn't Qualify							
(Brazil) 1993	Didn't Qualify							
(Thailand) 1995	Didn't Qualify							
(Poland) 1997	Didn't Qualify							
(Canada) 1999	Didn't Qualify							
(Dominican Republic) 2001	Didn't Qualify							
(Thailand) 2003		13th place						Squad
(Turkey) 2005		8th place						Squad
(Thailand) 2007		9th place						Squad
(Mexico) 2009	Didn't Qualify							
(Peru) 2011	Didn't Qualify							
(Czech Republic) 2013		19th place						Squad
(Puerto Rico) 2015		14th place						Squad
(Mexico) 2017	Didn't Qualify							
(Mexico) 2019	Didn't Qualify							
(Belgium) (Netherlands) 2021		16th place						Squad
Total	0 Titles	9/21						

=== NORCECA U20 Championship ===
Champions Runners up Third place Fourth place

NORCECA U20 Championship
Year	Round	Position	Pld	W	L	SW	SL	Squad
(Mexico) 1998	Semifinals	4th place						Squad
(Cuba) 2000		5/6th place						Squad
(Puerto Rico) 2002	Final	1st place						Squad
(Canada) 2004	Semifinals	Third place						Squad
(Mexico) 2006	Semifinals	Third place						Squad
(Mexico) 2008	Semifinals	4th place						Squad
(Mexico) 2010		5th place						Squad
(Nicaragua) 2012	Didn't Enter							
(Guatemala) 2014	Didn't Enter							
(United States) 2016	Semifinals	4th place						Squad
Total	1 Title	8/10						

=== Pan-American U20 Cup ===
Champions Runners up Third place Fourth place

Pan-American U20 Cup
Year	Round	Position	Pld	W	L	SW	SL	Squad
(Peru) 2011	Didn't Enter							
(Cuba) 2013		5th place						Squad
(Dominican Republic) 2015	Didn't Enter							
(Costa Rica) 2017	Semifinals	4th place						Squad
Total	0 Titles	2/4						

== Team ==
=== Current squad ===
The following is the Puerto Rican roster in the 2015 FIVB Volleyball Women's U20 World Championship.

Head Coach: Xiomara Molero

No.	Name	Date of birth	Height	Weight	Spike	Block	2015 club
1	Ivania Ortiz	15 July 1999	1.75 m (5 ft 9 in)	78 kg (172 lb)	244 cm (96 in)	235 cm (93 in)	(Puerto Rico) National Team
2	Gabriela Ramos	10 September 1998	1.82 m (6 ft 0 in)	68 kg (150 lb)	243 cm (96 in)	239 cm (94 in)	(Puerto Rico) National Team
4	Dariana Hollingsworth	17 June 1999	1.76 m (5 ft 9 in)	69 kg (152 lb)	236 cm (93 in)	231 cm (91 in)	(Puerto Rico) National Team
5	Karla Santos	28 November 1997	1.89 m (6 ft 2 in)	67 kg (148 lb)	302 cm (119 in)	296 cm (117 in)	(Puerto Rico) National Team
6	Barbara Lopez (C)	2 July 1996	1.78 m (5 ft 10 in)	65 kg (143 lb)	252 cm (99 in)	246 cm (97 in)	(Puerto Rico) National Team
7	Nelmarie Cruz	3 June 1996	1.83 m (6 ft 0 in)	66 kg (146 lb)	299 cm (118 in)	289 cm (114 in)	(Puerto Rico) National Team
8	Andrea Fuentes	12 May 1999	1.85 m (6 ft 1 in)	68 kg (150 lb)	256 cm (101 in)	249 cm (98 in)	(Puerto Rico) National Team
10	Yeaneska Matos	29 April 1996	1.86 m (6 ft 1 in)	68 kg (150 lb)	302 cm (119 in)	297 cm (117 in)	(Puerto Rico) National Team
11	Natalia Peta	5 April 1998	1.85 m (6 ft 1 in)	64 kg (141 lb)	242 cm (95 in)	238 cm (94 in)	(Puerto Rico) National Team
12	Bianca Torres	2 July 1996	1.79 m (5 ft 10 in)	67 kg (148 lb)	258 cm (102 in)	252 cm (99 in)	(Puerto Rico) National Team
14	Janersis Brignoni	30 April 1997	1.82 m (6 ft 0 in)	90 kg (200 lb)	256 cm (101 in)	250 cm (98 in)	(Puerto Rico) National Team
19	Paola Rivera	6 March 1997	1.77 m (5 ft 10 in)	73 kg (161 lb)	235 cm (93 in)	230 cm (91 in)	(Puerto Rico) National Team
