= Cuba women's national under-21 volleyball team =

Youth volleyball team representing Cuba

Cuba
- Association: Cuban Volleyball Federation
- Confederation: NORCECA

Uniforms
| Home | Away | Third |

FIVB U21 World Championship
- Appearances: 13 (First in 1981)
- Best result: (gold) Gold Medalist : (1985, 1993)

NORCECA U20 Championship
- Appearances: 9 (First in 2000)
- Best result: (gold) Gold Medalist : (2000)

The Cuba women's national under-20 volleyball team represents Cuba in women's under-20 volleyball events, it is controlled and managed by the Cuban Volleyball Federation that is a member of North American volleyball body North, Central America and Caribbean Volleyball Confederation (NORCECA) and the international volleyball body government the Fédération Internationale de Volleyball (FIVB).

== Results ==
=== FIVB U20 World Championship ===
Champions Runners up Third place Fourth place

FIVB U20 World Championship
| Year | Round | Position | Pld | W | L | SW | SL | Squad |
|---|---|---|---|---|---|---|---|---|
| (Brazil) 1977 | Didn't Enter | | | | | | | |
| (Mexico) 1981 | | 7th place | | | | | | Squad |
| (Italy) 1985 | Final | 1st place | | | | | | Squad |
| (South Korea) 1987 | Didn't Qualify | | | | | | | |
| (Peru) 1989 | Final | Runners-Up | | | | | | Squad |
| (Czechoslovakia) 1991 | | 13th place | | | | | | Squad |
| (Brazil) 1993 | Final | 1st place | | | | | | Squad |
| (Thailand) 1995 | | 9th place | | | | | | Squad |
| (Poland) 1997 | | 8th place | | | | | | Squad |
| (Canada) 1999 | Didn't Qualify | | | | | | | |
| (Dominican Republic) 2001 | | 13th place | | | | | | Squad |
| (Thailand) 2003 | | 13th place | | | | | | Squad |
| (Turkey) 2005 | Didn't Qualify | | | | | | | |
| (Thailand) 2007 | Didn't Qualify | | | | | | | |
| (Mexico) 2009 | | 9th place | | | | | | Squad |
| (Peru) 2011 | | 12th place | | | | | | Squad |
| (Czech Republic) 2013 | Didn't Qualify | | | | | | | |
| (Puerto Rico) 2015 | | 13th place | | | | | | Squad |
| (Mexico) 2017 | | 15th place | | | | | | Squad |
| (Mexico) 2019 | | 14th place | | | | | | Squad |
| (Belgium) (Netherlands) 2021 | withdrew | | | | | | | |
| Total | 2 Titles | 14/21 | | | | | | |

=== NORCECA U20 Championship ===
Champions Runners up Third place Fourth place

NORCECA U20 Championship
| Year | Round | Position | Pld | W | L | SW | SL | Squad |
|---|---|---|---|---|---|---|---|---|
| (Mexico) 1998 | Didn't Enter | | | | | | | |
| (Cuba) 2000 | Final | 1st place | | | | | | Squad |
| (Puerto Rico) 2002 | Semifinals | Third place | | | | | | Squad |
| (Canada) 2004 | | 5th place | | | | | | Squad |
| (Mexico) 2006 | | 5th place | | | | | | Squad |
| (Mexico) 2008 | Semifinals | Third place | | | | | | Squad |
| (Mexico) 2010 | Semifinals | Third place | | | | | | Squad |
| (Nicaragua) 2012 | | 5th place | | | | | | Squad |
| (Guatemala) 2014 | Final | Runners-Up | | | | | | Squad |
| (United States) 2016 | Semifinals | Third place | | | | | | Squad |
| Total | 1 Title | 9/10 | | | | | | |

=== Pan-American U20 Cup ===
Champions Runners up Third place Fourth place

Pan-American U20 Cup
| Year | Round | Position | Pld | W | L | SW | SL | Squad |
|---|---|---|---|---|---|---|---|---|
| (Peru) 2011 | Semifinals | Third place | | | | | | Squad |
| (Cuba) 2013 | | 6th place | | | | | | Squad |
| (Dominican Republic) 2015 | Didn't Enter | | | | | | | |
| (Costa Rica) 2017 | Semifinals | Third place | | | | | | Squad |
| Total | 0 Titles | 3/4 | | | | | | |

== Team ==
=== Current squad ===
The following is the Cuban roster in the 2015 FIVB Volleyball Women's U20 World Championship.

Head Coach: Wilfredo Robinson Pupo

| No. | Name | Date of birth | Height | Weight | Spike | Block | 2015 club |
|---|---|---|---|---|---|---|---|
| 1 | Dalila Palma | 18 November 1999 | 1.82 m (6 ft 0 in) | 62 kg (137 lb) | 301 cm (119 in) | 285 cm (112 in) | (Cuba) Cienfuegos |
| 5 | Laura Suarez | 13 December 1998 | 1.85 m (6 ft 1 in) | 75 kg (165 lb) | 304 cm (120 in) | 292 cm (115 in) | (Cuba) Pinar del Río |
| 6 | Aidachi Aguero | 19 March 1999 | 1.77 m (5 ft 10 in) | 69 kg (152 lb) | 304 cm (120 in) | 295 cm (116 in) | (Cuba) Camagüey |
| 7 | Claudia Hernández | 9 January 1997 | 1.81 m (5 ft 11 in) | 78 kg (172 lb) | 225 cm (89 in) | 223 cm (88 in) | (Cuba) La Bahana |
| 8 | Diaris Perez (C) | 16 November 1998 | 1.82 m (6 ft 0 in) | 75 kg (165 lb) | 304 cm (120 in) | 295 cm (116 in) | (Cuba) Havana |
| 10 | Kitania Medina | 24 February 1999 | 1.86 m (6 ft 1 in) | 77 kg (170 lb) | 308 cm (121 in) | 295 cm (116 in) | (Cuba) Havana |
| 12 | Ailama Cese | 29 October 2000 | 1.88 m (6 ft 2 in) | 58 kg (128 lb) | 322 cm (127 in) | 308 cm (121 in) | (Cuba) Mayabeque |
| 13 | Liset Herrera | 6 December 1998 | 1.92 m (6 ft 4 in) | 70 kg (150 lb) | 311 cm (122 in) | 300 cm (120 in) | (Cuba) Matanzas |
| 14 | Anaila Martinez | 20 March 1999 | 1.84 m (6 ft 0 in) | 70 kg (150 lb) | 320 cm (130 in) | 310 cm (120 in) | (Cuba) Villa Clara |
| 15 | Carmela Massip | 17 January 1998 | 1.81 m (5 ft 11 in) | 65 kg (143 lb) | 304 cm (120 in) | 295 cm (116 in) | (Cuba) Sancti Spiritus |
| 16 | Sonia Romero | 2 August 1997 | 1.83 m (6 ft 0 in) | 70 kg (150 lb) | 301 cm (119 in) | 288 cm (113 in) | (Cuba) La Habana |
| 18 | Anet Alfonso | 26 June 1996 | 1.72 m (5 ft 8 in) | 54 kg (119 lb) | 225 cm (89 in) | 222 cm (87 in) | (Cuba) Camagüey |
