= 2014 Women's Junior NORCECA Volleyball Championship =

Tournament details
- Host country: Guatemala
- Dates: July 8–13, 2014
- Teams: 9
- Venue: 1 (in Guatemala host cities)

Final positions
- Champions: United States (6th title)

Tournament awards
- MVP: Rhamat Alhassan (USA)

The 2014 Girls' Youth NORCECA Volleyball Championship was the ninth edition of the bi-annual women's volleyball tournament, played by nine countries from July 8–13, 2014 in Guatemala, Guatemala. USA and Cuba qualified to the 2015 Women's Junior World Championship.

== Competing nations ==
| Group A | Group B | Group C |
|---|---|---|
| Cuba; Dominican Republic; Nicaragua | Martinique; Guatemala; Costa Rica | Saint Lucia; Mexico; United States |

== Pool standing procedure ==
Match won 3–0: 5 points for the winner, 0 point for the loser
Match won 3–1: 4 points for the winner, 1 points for the loser
Match won 3–2: 3 points for the winner, 2 points for the loser
In case of tie, the teams were classified according to the following criteria:
points ratio and sets ratio

== First round ==
| Team advances to semifinals |
| Team advances to quarterfinals |

=== Pool A ===
| Pos | Team | Pld | W | L | Pts | SPW | SPL | SPR | SW | SL | SR | Qualification |
|---|---|---|---|---|---|---|---|---|---|---|---|---|
| 1 | Cuba | 2 | 2 | 0 | 9 | 167 | 110 | 1.518 | 6 | 1 | 6.000 | Semifinals |
| 2 | Dominican Republic | 2 | 1 | 1 | 6 | 152 | 112 | 1.357 | 4 | 3 | 1.333 | Quarterfinals |
| 3 | Nicaragua | 2 | 0 | 2 | 0 | 53 | 150 | 0.353 | 0 | 6 | 0.000 | |

| Date | Time | | Score | | Set 1 | Set 2 | Set 3 | Set 4 | Set 5 | Total | Report |
|---|---|---|---|---|---|---|---|---|---|---|---|
| 8-jul | 17:00 | Cuba | 3–0 | Nicaragua | 25–11 | 25–6 | 25–16 | | | 75–33 | P2P3 |
| 9-jul | 15:00 | Nicaragua | 0–3 | Dominican Republic | 3–25 | 9–25 | 8–25 | | | 20–75 | P2P3 |
| 10-jul | 15:00 | Dominican Republic | 1–3 | Cuba | 16–25 | 16–25 | 25–17 | 20–25 | | 77–92 | P2P3 |

=== Pool B ===
| Pos | Team | Pld | W | L | Pts | SPW | SPL | SPR | SW | SL | SR | Qualification |
|---|---|---|---|---|---|---|---|---|---|---|---|---|
| 1 | Costa Rica | 2 | 2 | 0 | 8 | 183 | 124 | 1.476 | 6 | 2 | 3.000 | Quarterfinals |
| 2 | Guatemala | 2 | 1 | 1 | 7 | 170 | 151 | 1.126 | 5 | 3 | 1.667 | Quarterfinals |
| 3 | Martinique | 2 | 0 | 2 | 0 | 72 | 150 | 0.480 | 0 | 6 | 0.000 | |

| Date | Time | | Score | | Set 1 | Set 2 | Set 3 | Set 4 | Set 5 | Total | Report |
|---|---|---|---|---|---|---|---|---|---|---|---|
| 8-jul | 19:00 | Martinique | 0–3 | Guatemala | 14–25 | 12–25 | 17–25 | | | 43–75 | P2P3 |
| 9-jul | 17:00 | Costa Rica | 3–0 | Martinique | 25–12 | 25–12 | 25–5 | | | 75–29 | P2P3 |
| 10-jul | 19:00 | Guatemala | 2–3 | Costa Rica | 17–25 | 20–25 | 25–22 | 25–21 | 8–15 | 95–108 | P2P3 |

=== Pool C ===
| Pos | Team | Pld | W | L | Pts | SPW | SPL | SPR | SW | SL | SR | Qualification |
|---|---|---|---|---|---|---|---|---|---|---|---|---|
| 1 | United States | 2 | 2 | 0 | 10 | 150 | 56 | 2.679 | 6 | 0 | MAX | Semifinals |
| 2 | Mexico | 2 | 1 | 1 | 5 | 119 | 108 | 1.102 | 3 | 3 | 1.000 | Quarterfinals |
| 3 | Saint Lucia | 2 | 0 | 2 | 0 | 45 | 150 | 0.300 | 0 | 6 | 0.000 | |

| Date | Time | | Score | | Set 1 | Set 2 | Set 3 | Set 4 | Set 5 | Total | Report |
|---|---|---|---|---|---|---|---|---|---|---|---|
| 8-jul | 15:00 | Saint Lucia | 0–3 | Mexico | 7–25 | 18–25 | 8–25 | | | 33–75 | P2P3 |
| 9-jul | 19:00 | United States | 3–0 | Saint Lucia | 25–5 | 25–4 | 25–3 | | | 75–12 | P2P3 |
| 10-jul | 17:00 | Mexico | 0–3 | United States | 5–25 | 21–25 | 18–25 | | | 44–75 | P2P3 |

== Final round ==
=== Championship bracket ===
Quarterfinals
B2 | Guatemala | 0
A2 | Dominican Republic | 3
B1 | Costa Rica | 0
C2 | Mexico | 3

Semifinals
C1 | United States | 3
A2 | Dominican Republic | 0
A1 | Cuba | 3
C2 | Mexico | 1
Classification 5–6
B2 | Guatemala | 1
B1 | Costa Rica | 3

Finals
C1 | United States | 3
A1 | Cuba | 0
Classification 3–4
A2 | Dominican Republic | 3
C2 | Mexico | 0

=== Classification 9 ===
| Date | Time | | Score | | Set 1 | Set 2 | Set 3 | Set 4 | Set 5 | Total | Report |
|---|---|---|---|---|---|---|---|---|---|---|---|
| 11-jul | 15:00 | Nicaragua | 3–0 | Saint Lucia | 25–19 | 25–20 | 25–21 | | | 75–60 | P2P3 |

=== Quarterfinals ===
| Date | Time | | Score | | Set 1 | Set 2 | Set 3 | Set 4 | Set 5 | Total | Report |
|---|---|---|---|---|---|---|---|---|---|---|---|
| 11-jul | 17:00 | Guatemala | 0–3 | Dominican Republic | 4–25 | 4–25 | 2–25 | | | 10–75 | P2P3 |
| 11-jul | 19:00 | Costa Rica | 0–3 | Mexico | 10–25 | 12–25 | 16–25 | | | 38–75 | P2P3 |

=== Classification 7-8 ===
| Date | Time | | Score | | Set 1 | Set 2 | Set 3 | Set 4 | Set 5 | Total | Report |
|---|---|---|---|---|---|---|---|---|---|---|---|
| 12-jul | 15:00 | Martinique | 0–3 | Nicaragua | 22–25 | 18–25 | 23–25 | | | 63–75 | P2P3 |

=== Semifinals ===
| Date | Time | | Score | | Set 1 | Set 2 | Set 3 | Set 4 | Set 5 | Total | Report |
|---|---|---|---|---|---|---|---|---|---|---|---|
| 12-jul | 17:00 | Cuba | 3–1 | Mexico | 25–23 | 14–25 | 25–22 | 25–20 | | 89–90 | P2P3 |
| 12-jul | 19:00 | United States | 3–0 | Dominican Republic | 25–16 | 25–20 | 25–18 | | | 75–54 | P2P3 |

=== Classification 5-6 ===
| Date | Time | | Score | | Set 1 | Set 2 | Set 3 | Set 4 | Set 5 | Total | Report |
|---|---|---|---|---|---|---|---|---|---|---|---|
| 13-jul | 15:00 | Guatemala | 1–3 | Costa Rica | 17–25 | 25–21 | 9–25 | 15–25 | | 66–96 | P2P3 |

=== Classification 3-4 ===
| Date | Time | | Score | | Set 1 | Set 2 | Set 3 | Set 4 | Set 5 | Total | Report |
|---|---|---|---|---|---|---|---|---|---|---|---|
| 13-jul | 17:00 | Mexico | 0–3 | Dominican Republic | 17–25 | 16–25 | 19–25 | | | 52–75 | P2P3 |

=== Final ===
| Date | Time | | Score | | Set 1 | Set 2 | Set 3 | Set 4 | Set 5 | Total | Report |
|---|---|---|---|---|---|---|---|---|---|---|---|
| 13-jul | 19:00 | Cuba | 0–3 | United States | 15–25 | 22–25 | 16–25 | | | 53–75 | P2P3 |

== Final standing ==
| Rank | Team |
|---|---|
| 1st place, gold medalist(s) | United States |
| 2nd place, silver medalist(s) | Cuba |
| 3rd place, bronze medalist(s) | Dominican Republic |
| 4 | Mexico |
| 5 | Costa Rica |
| 6 | Guatemala |
| 7 | Nicaragua |
| 8 | Martinique |
| 9 | Saint Lucia |

== All-Star Team ==
- Most valuable player
  - Rhamat Alhassan (USA)
- Best setter
  - Jordyn Poulter (USA)
- Best Opposite
  - Gaila González (DOM)
- Best Outside Hitters
  - Courtney Schwan (USA)
  - Diaris Pérez (CUB)
- Best Middle Blockers
  - Rhamat Alhassan (USA)
  - Patricia Valle (MEX)
- Best libero
  - Dayessi Luis (CUB)
