= Mexico women's national under-21 volleyball team =

Mexico
- Association: Mexican Volleyball Federation
- Confederation: NORCECA

Uniforms
| Home | Away | Third |

FIVB U21 World Championship
- Appearances: 10 (First in 1977)
- Best result: 4th Place : (1981)

NORCECA U20 Championship
- Appearances: 10 (First in 1998)
- Best result: (silver) Silver : (1998, 2012)

The Mexico women's national under-20 volleyball team represents Mexico in international women's volleyball competitions and friendly matches under the age 20 and it is ruled by the Mexican Volleyball Federation That Follow the North, Central America and Caribbean Volleyball Confederation NORCECA and also is a part of The Federation of International Volleyball FIVB.

== Results ==
=== FIVB U21 World Championship ===
Champions Runners up Third place Fourth place

FIVB U21 World Championship
| Year | Round | Position | Pld | W | L | SW | SL | Squad |
|---|---|---|---|---|---|---|---|---|
| (Brazil) 1977 | | 6th place | | | | | | Squad |
| (Mexico) 1981 | | 4th place | | | | | | Squad |
| (Italy) 1985 | | 11th place | | | | | | Squad |
| (South Korea) 1987 | Didn't Qualify | | | | | | | |
| (Peru) 1989 | | 16th place | | | | | | Squad |
| (Czechoslovakia) 1991 | Didn't Qualify | | | | | | | |
| (Brazil) 1993 | | 13th place | | | | | | Squad |
| (Thailand) 1995 | Didn't Qualify | | | | | | | |
| (Poland) 1997 | Didn't Qualify | | | | | | | |
| (Canada) 1999 | | 9th place | | | | | | Squad |
| (Dominican Republic) 2001 | Didn't Qualify | | | | | | | |
| (Thailand) 2003 | Didn't Qualify | | | | | | | |
| (Turkey) 2005 | Didn't Qualify | | | | | | | |
| (Thailand) 2007 | Didn't Qualify | | | | | | | |
| (Mexico) 2009 | | 8th place | | | | | | Squad |
| (Peru) 2011 | Didn't Qualify | | | | | | | |
| (Czech Republic) 2013 | | 15th place | | | | | | Squad |
| (Puerto Rico) 2015 | | 15th place | | | | | | Squad |
| (Mexico) 2017 | | 13th place | | | | | | Squad |
| (Mexico) 2019 | | 10th place | | | | | | Squad |
| (Netherlands) / (Belgium) 2021 | Didn't Qualify | | | | | | | |
| (Mexico) 2023 | | 8th place | | | | | | Squad |
| Total | 0 Titles | 12/22 | | | | | | |

=== NORCECA U20 Championship ===
Champions Runners up Third place Fourth place

NORCECA U20 Championship
| Year | Round | Position | Pld | W | L | SW | SL | Squad |
|---|---|---|---|---|---|---|---|---|
| (Mexico) 1998 | Final | Runners-Up | | | | | | Squad |
| (Cuba) 2000 | Semifinals | Third place | | | | | | Squad |
| (Puerto Rico) 2002 | | 5th place | | | | | | Squad |
| (Canada) 2004 | | 6th place | | | | | | Squad |
| (Mexico) 2006 | | 6th place | | | | | | Squad |
| (Mexico) 2008 | | 6th place | | | | | | Squad |
| (Mexico) 2010 | Semifinals | 4th place | | | | | | Squad |
| (Nicaragua) 2012 | Final | Runners-Up | | | | | | Squad |
| (Guatemala) 2014 | Semifinals | 4th place | | | | | | Squad |
| (United States) 2016 | | 5th place | | | | | | Squad |
| Total | 0 Titles | 10/10 | | | | | | |

=== Pan-American U20 Cup ===
Champions Runners up Third place Fourth place

Pan-American U20 Cup
| Year | Round | Position | Pld | W | L | SW | SL | Squad |
|---|---|---|---|---|---|---|---|---|
| (Peru) 2011 | Semifinals | 4th place | | | | | | Squad |
| (Cuba) 2013 | Final | 1st place | | | | | | Squad |
| (Dominican Republic) 2015 | Semifinals | 4th place | | | | | | Squad |
| (Costa Rica) 2017 | Didn't Compete | | | | | | | |
| Total | 1 Title | 3/4 | | | | | | |

== Team ==
=== Current squad ===
The following is the Mexican roster in the 2015 FIVB Volleyball Women's U20 World Championship.

Head Coach: Luis Leon

| No. | Name | Date of birth | Height | Weight | Spike | Block | 2015 club |
|---|---|---|---|---|---|---|---|
| 2 | Leslie Lopez | 13 February 1996 | 1.69 m (5 ft 7 in) | 78 kg (172 lb) | 198 cm (78 in) | 190 cm (75 in) | (Mexico) Durango |
| 4 | Maria Rodriguez | 23 June 1997 | 1.85 m (6 ft 1 in) | 80 kg (180 lb) | 287 cm (113 in) | 280 cm (110 in) | (Mexico) Nuevo León |
| 6 | Janeth Vargas | 25 July 1997 | 1.69 m (5 ft 7 in) | 68 kg (150 lb) | 200 cm (79 in) | 210 cm (83 in) | (Mexico) Nuevo León |
| 7 | Maria Aguilera | 8 June 1997 | 1.53 m (5 ft 0 in) | 55 kg (121 lb) | 260 cm (100 in) | 240 cm (94 in) | (Mexico) Nuevo León |
| 9 | Kathya Garcia | 6 March 1998 | 1.75 m (5 ft 9 in) | 68 kg (150 lb) | 286 cm (113 in) | 275 cm (108 in) | (Mexico) Chihuahua |
| 11 | Miriam Bojorquez | 14 December 1997 | 1.64 m (5 ft 5 in) | 66 kg (146 lb) | 195 cm (77 in) | 200 cm (79 in) | (Mexico) Sinaloa |
| 12 | Montserrat Castro | 12 December 1996 | 1.99 m (6 ft 6 in) | 85 kg (187 lb) | 270 cm (110 in) | 268 cm (106 in) | (Mexico) UNAM |
| 14 | Fernanda Bañuelos (C) | 19 March 1997 | 1.86 m (6 ft 1 in) | 70 kg (150 lb) | 303 cm (119 in) | 285 cm (112 in) | (Mexico) Baja California |
| 16 | Kitzia Corrales | 12 February 1996 | 1.78 m (5 ft 10 in) | 71 kg (157 lb) | 0 cm (0 in) | 0 cm (0 in) | (Mexico) Sinaloa |
| 17 | Karina Flores | 16 August 1998 | 1.88 m (6 ft 2 in) | 72 kg (159 lb) | 293 cm (115 in) | 288 cm (113 in) | (Mexico) Nuevo León |
| 18 | Mitzy Gonzalez | 3 August 1997 | 1.68 m (5 ft 6 in) | 75 kg (165 lb) | 211 cm (83 in) | 209 cm (82 in) | (Mexico) Sinaloa |
| 20 | Alondra Amaro | 9 June 1998 | 1.88 m (6 ft 2 in) | 69 kg (152 lb) | 275 cm (108 in) | 250 cm (98 in) | (Mexico) Durango |
