= 1997 FIVB Volleyball Women's U20 World Championship =

1997 FIVB Women's U20 World Championship
Tournament details
- Host country: Poland
- Dates: September 5–13, 1997
- Teams: 16
- Venue: 1 (in Gdynia host cities)

Final positions
- Champions: Russia (2nd title)
- Runners-up: Italy
- Third place: China
- Fourth place: Japan

The 1997 FIVB Women's U20 World Championship was held in Gdynia, Poland from September 5 to 13, 1997. 16 teams participated in the tournament. This tournament had to be played at Gdynia, Poland.

== Qualification process ==
Confederation	Method of Qualification	Date	Venue	Vacancies	Qualified
FIVB	Host			1	Poland
NORCECA	NORCECA Election			2	Cuba; Dominican Republic
CEV	1996 European Junior Championship	September 7 – 15, 1996	Ankara, Turkey	5	Italy; Russia; Ukraine; Germany*; Czech Republic**
AVC	1996 Asian Junior Championship	September 15 – 22, 1996	Chiang Mai, Thailand	3	China; Japan; South Korea
CSV	1996 South American Junior Championship	September 23 – 29, 1996	Caracas, Venezuela	2	Brazil; Argentina
CAVB	African Election			2	Kenya; Mauritius
FIVB	Wild card			1	Yugoslavia
Total				16	

- * Germany replaced France.
- ** Czechia replaced Croatia.

== Pools composition ==
Pool A	Pool B	Pool C	Pool D
Poland; Dominican Republic; Germany; Kenya	Cuba; Italy; Japan; Mauritius	Argentina; Brazil; Russia; Yugoslavia	China; Czech Republic; South Korea; Ukraine

== Preliminary round ==
=== Pool A ===
Pos	Team	Pld	W	L	Pts	SW	SL	SR	SPW	SPL	SPR	Qualification
1	Germany	3	3	0	6	9	2	4.500	153	83	1.843	Seeding group
2	Poland	3	2	1	5	6	4	1.500	166	104	1.596	Elimination group
3	Dominican Republic	3	1	2	4	4	6	0.667	86	135	0.637	Elimination group
4	Kenya	3	0	3	3	0	9	0.000	52	135	0.385	Eliminated

Date	Game		
05 Sep	Germany	3–0	Dominican Republic
05 Sep	Poland	3–0	Kenya
06 Sep	Dominican Republic	3–0	Kenya
06 Sep	Germany	3–2	Poland
07 Sep	Germany	3–0	Kenya
07 Sep	Poland	3–1	Dominican Republic

=== Pool B ===
Pos	Team	Pld	W	L	Pts	SW	SL	SR	SPW	SPL	SPR	Qualification
1	Italy	3	3	0	6	9	0	MAX	137	51	2.686	Seeding group
2	Japan	3	2	1	5	6	3	2.000	115	76	1.513	Elimination group
3	Cuba	3	1	2	4	3	6	0.500	90	119	0.756	Elimination group
4	Mauritius	3	0	3	3	0	9	0.000	41	137	0.299	Eliminated

Date	Game		
05 Sep	Italy	3–0	Cuba
05 Sep	Mauritius	0–3	Japan
06 Sep	Japan	0–3	Italy
06 Sep	Mauritius	0–3	Cuba
07 Sep	Italy	3–0	Mauritius
07 Sep	Japan	3–0	Cuba

=== Pool C ===
Pos	Team	Pld	W	L	Pts	SW	SL	SR	SPW	SPL	SPR	Qualification
1	Russia	3	3	0	6	9	0	MAX	135	60	2.250	Seeding group
2	Brazil	3	2	1	5	6	3	2.000	115	104	1.106	Elimination group
3	Yugoslavia	3	1	2	4	3	7	0.429	107	124	0.863	Elimination group
4	Argentina	3	0	3	3	1	9	0.111	75	144	0.521	Eliminated

Date	Game		
05 Sep	Brazil	3–0	Yugoslavia
05 Sep	Russia	3–0	Argentina
06 Sep	Russia	3–0	Yugoslavia
06 Sep	Brazil	3–0	Argentina
07 Sep	Yugoslavia	3–1	Argentina
07 Sep	Russia	3–0	Brazil

=== Pool D ===
Pos	Team	Pld	W	L	Pts	SW	SL	SR	SPW	SPL	SPR	Qualification
1	China	3	3	0	6	9	1	9.000	0	0	—	Seeding group
2	South Korea	3	2	1	5	7	4	1.750	0	0	—	Elimination group
3	Czech Republic	3	1	2	4	4	8	0.500	0	0	—	Elimination group
4	Ukraine	3	0	3	3	2	9	0.222	0	0	—	Eliminated

Date	Game		
05 Sep	South Korea	3–0	Ukraine
05 Sep	China	3–0	Czech Republic
06 Sep	South Korea	3–1	Czech Republic
06 Sep	China	3–0	Ukraine
07 Sep	China	3–1	South Korea
07 Sep	Czech Republic	3–2	Ukraine

== Second round ==
=== Play off – elimination group ===
Date	Game		
09 Sep	Italy	3–0	China
09 Sep	Russia	3–0	Germany

=== Play off – seeding group ===
Date	Game		
09 Sep	Japan	3–0	Dominican Republic
09 Sep	Czech Republic	3–2	Brazil
09 Sep	Cuba	3–0	South Korea
09 Sep	Poland	3–1	Yugoslavia

== Final round ==
Quarterfinals
September 11 – Gdynia
Russia	3
Czech Republic	0
September 11 – Gdynia
China	3
Cuba	0
September 11 – Gdynia
Italy	3
Poland	1
September 11 – Gdynia
Japan	3
Germany	0

Semifinals
September 12 – Gdynia
Russia	3
China	2
September 12 – Gdynia
Italy	3
Japan	0

Final
September 13 – Gdynia
Russia	3
Italy	2
3rd place
September 13 – Gdynia
China	3
Japan	0

5th–8th places
September 12 – Gdynia
Poland	3
Germany	0
September 12 – Gdynia
Czech Republic	3
Cuba	0

5th place
September 13 – Gdynia
Poland	3
Czech Republic	0
7th place
September 13 – Gdynia
Germany	3
Cuba	1

=== Quarterfinals ===
Date	Game			Set 1	Set 2	Set 3	Set 4	Set 5	Total
11 Sep	Russia	3–0	Czech Republic	15–11	15–6	16–14			46–31
11 Sep	China	3–0	Cuba	15–1	15–6	15–6			45–13
11 Sep	Italy	3–1	Poland	15–8	12–15	15–4	15–1		57–28
11 Sep	Japan	3–0	Germany	15–4	15–11	15–7			45–22

=== 5th–8th semifinals ===
Date	Game			Set 1	Set 2	Set 3	Set 4	Set 5	Total
12 Sep	Poland	3–0	Germany	15–6	15–9	15–11			45–26
12 Sep	Czech Republic	3–0	Cuba	15–5	15–3	15–11			45–19

=== Semifinals ===
Date	Game			Set 1	Set 2	Set 3	Set 4	Set 5	Total
12 Sep	Russia	3–2	China	15–5	15–8	14–16	10–15	15–13	69–57
12 Sep	Italy	3–0	Japan	15–8	15–8	15–10			45–26

=== 7th place ===
Date	Game			Set 1	Set 2	Set 3	Set 4	Set 5	Total
13 Sep	Germany	3–1	Cuba	15–3	15–3	12–15	15–9		57–30

=== 5th place ===
Date	Game			Set 1	Set 2	Set 3	Set 4	Set 5	Total
13 Sep	Poland	3–0	Czech Republic	15–6	15–4	15–13			45–23

=== 3rd place ===
Date	Game			Set 1	Set 2	Set 3	Set 4	Set 5	Total
13 Sep	China	3–0	Japan	15–0	15–8	15–9			45–17

=== Final ===
Date	Game			Set 1	Set 2	Set 3	Set 4	Set 5	Total
13 Sep	Russia	3–2	Italy	15–3	15–8	8–15	4–15	16–14	58–55

== Final standing ==
Rank	Team
1st place, gold medalist(s)	Russia
2nd place, silver medalist(s)	Italy
3rd place, bronze medalist(s)	China
4	Japan
5	Poland
6	Czech Republic
7	Germany
8	Cuba
9	Brazil
9	Dominican Republic
9	South Korea
9	Yugoslavia
13	Argentina
13	Kenya
13	Mauritius
13	Ukraine

1997 FIVB Women's Junior World champions

Russia
2nd title

12–woman Roster
Elena Vassilevskaya, Irina Tebenikhina, Anna Artamonova, Olga Chukanova, Anastasia Belikova, Natalia Safronova, Ekaterina Gamova, Anjela Gourieva, Marina Ivanova, Tatiana Gorchkova, Elena Plotnikova and Ekaterina Shitselova
Head coach
Valeri Youriev
