= 2007 FIVB Volleyball Women's U20 World Championship =

2007 FIVB Women's Junior World Championship
Tournament details
- Host country: Thailand
- Dates: July 20–27
- Teams: 12
- Venue: 1 (in Nakhon Ratchasima host cities)

Final positions
- Champions: Brazil (6th title)

Tournament awards
- MVP: (Brazil) Natalia Pereira

The 2007 FIVB Women's Junior Volleyball World Championship was held in Nakhon Ratchasima, Thailand from July 20 to 27, 2007. 12 teams participated in the tournament.

== Qualification process ==
Confederation	Method of Qualification	Date	Venue	Vacancies	Qualified
FIVB	Host			1	Thailand
NORCECA	2006 NORCECA Junior Championship	August 8 – 13, 2006	Monterrey, Mexico	3	United States; Dominican Republic; Puerto Rico
CEV	2006 European Junior Championship	August 26 – September 3, 2006	Saint-Dié-des-Vosges, France	3	Italy; Croatia; Ukraine
CAVB	2006 African Junior Championship	September 16 – 20, 2006	Alexandria, Egypt	1	Egypt
AVC	2006 Asian Junior Championship	October 1 – 9, 2006	Nakhon Ratchasima, Thailand	2	China; Japan
CSV	2006 South American Junior Championship	October 11 – 15, 2006	Caracas, Venezuela	1	Brazil
FIVB	Wild card			1	Germany
Total				12	

== Pools composition ==
Pool A	Pool B
Thailand; China; United States; Egypt; Dominican Republic; Germany	Brazil; Italy; Japan; Puerto Rico; Croatia; Ukraine

== Preliminary round ==
=== Pool A ===
Pos	Team	Pld	W	L	Pts	SW	SL	SR	SPW	SPL	SPR	Qualification
1	China	5	4	1	9	13	4	3.250	413	310	1.332	Semifinals
2	United States	5	4	1	9	13	4	3.250	419	342	1.225	Semifinals
3	Germany	5	3	2	8	11	7	1.571	414	373	1.110	5th–8th place
4	Thailand	5	3	2	8	9	7	1.286	360	337	1.068	5th–8th place
5	Dominican Republic	5	1	4	6	3	13	0.231	265	388	0.683	
6	Egypt	5	0	5	5	1	15	0.067	284	405	0.701	

Date		Score		Set 1	Set 2	Set 3	Set 4	Set 5	Total
20 Jul	United States	1–3	Germany	25–27	25–14	18–25	21–25		89–91
20 Jul	Egypt	0–3	Thailand	18–25	23–25	12–25			53–75
20 Jul	Dominican Republic	0–3	China	8–25	8–25	13–25			29–75
21 Jul	Egypt	0–3	United States	30–32	12–25	23–25			65–82
21 Jul	Germany	3–0	Dominican Republic	25–12	25–21	25–21			75–54
21 Jul	Thailand	0–3	China	16–25	23–25	18–25			57–75
22 Jul	Dominican Republic	3–1	Egypt	25–22	25–18	23–25	25–22		98–87
22 Jul	United States	3–0	Thailand	25–20	25–18	25–19			75–57
22 Jul	China	3–1	Germany	25–21	25–22	23–25	25–16		98–84
23 Jul	Egypt	0–3	China	18–25	14–25	10–25			42–75
23 Jul	Thailand	3–1	Germany	20–25	25–23	25–22	25–19		95–89
23 Jul	United States	3–0	Dominican Republic	25–16	25–11	25–12			75–38
24 Jul	Germany	3–0	Egypt	25–12	25–12	25–13			75–37
24 Jul	Dominican Republic	0–3	Thailand	24–26	15–25	6–25			45–76
24 Jul	China	1–3	United States	22–25	22–25	25–23	21–25		90–98

=== Pool B ===
Pos	Team	Pld	W	L	Pts	SW	SL	SR	SPW	SPL	SPR	Qualification
1	Brazil	5	5	0	10	15	2	7.500	411	294	1.398	Semifinals
2	Japan	5	4	1	9	12	10	1.200	462	470	0.983	Semifinals
3	Ukraine	5	3	2	8	12	10	1.200	464	462	1.004	5th–8th place
4	Italy	5	2	3	7	10	10	1.000	430	422	1.019	5th–8th place
5	Croatia	5	1	4	6	8	14	0.571	451	484	0.932	
6	Puerto Rico	5	0	5	5	4	15	0.267	366	452	0.810	

Date		Score		Set 1	Set 2	Set 3	Set 4	Set 5	Total
20 Jul	Japan	3–2	Ukraine	25–23	25–19	17–25	20–25	16–14	103–106
20 Jul	Brazil	3–1	Croatia	25–20	17–25	25–17	25–12		92–74
20 Jul	Italy	3–1	Puerto Rico	22–25	25–16	25–20	25–16		97–77
21 Jul	Japan	0–3	Brazil	16–25	19–25	13–25			48–75
21 Jul	Ukraine	3–0	Puerto Rico	25–21	25–21	25–22			75–64
21 Jul	Croatia	0–3	Italy	24–26	23–25	21–25			68–76
22 Jul	Brazil	3–1	Ukraine	25–20	19–25	25–18	25–19		94–82
22 Jul	Italy	2–3	Japan	25–27	25–22	23–25	25–16	9–15	107–105
22 Jul	Puerto Rico	2–3	Croatia	21–25	22–25	25–22	25–20	11–15	104–107
23 Jul	Japan	3–1	Puerto Rico	25–21	23–25	25–13	25–18		98–77
23 Jul	Ukraine	3–2	Croatia	16–25	25–16	21–25	25–16	17–15	104–97
23 Jul	Brazil	3–0	Italy	25–14	25–19	25–13			75–46
24 Jul	Croatia	2–3	Japan	21–25	25–19	25–19	28–30	6–15	105–108
24 Jul	Puerto Rico	0–3	Brazil	17–25	10–25	17–25			44–75
24 Jul	Italy	2–3	Ukraine	25–20	18–25	25–10	25–27	11–15	104–97

== Final round ==
=== 9th–12th places ===
Semifinals
Dominican Republic	0
Puerto Rico	3
Croatia	3
Egypt	0

9th place
Puerto Rico	3
Croatia	1
11th place
Dominican Republic	3
Egypt	0

=== Classification 9th and 12th ===
Date		Score		Set 1	Set 2	Set 3	Set 4	Set 5	Total
26 Jul	Dominican Republic	0–3	Puerto Rico	15–25	18–25	18–25			51–75
26 Jul	Croatia	3–0	Egypt	25–19	25–11	25–12			75–42

=== Classification 11th ===
Date		Score		Set 1	Set 2	Set 3	Set 4	Set 5	Total
27 Jul	Dominican Republic	3–0	Egypt	25–15	25–21	25–11			75–47

=== Classification 9th ===
Date		Score		Set 1	Set 2	Set 3	Set 4	Set 5	Total
27 Jul	Puerto Rico	3–1	Croatia	27–29	25–19	26–24	25–17		103–89

=== 5th–8th places ===
Semifinals
Germany	0
Italy	3
Ukraine	3
Thailand	0

5th place
Italy	3
Ukraine	1
7th place
Germany	3
Thailand	1

=== Classification 5th and 8th ===
Date		Score		Set 1	Set 2	Set 3	Set 4	Set 5	Total
26 Jul	Germany	0–3	Italy	14–25	21–25	21–25			56–75
26 Jul	Ukraine	0–3	Thailand	25–14	25–23	25–17			75–54

=== Classification 7th ===
Date		Score		Set 1	Set 2	Set 3	Set 4	Set 5	Total
27 Jul	Germany	3–1	Thailand	27–25	25–10	22–25	25–23		99–83

=== Classification 5th ===
Date		Score		Set 1	Set 2	Set 3	Set 4	Set 5	Total
27 Jul	Italy	3–1	Ukraine	18–25	25–21	25–17	25–22		93–85

=== Championship round ===
Semifinals
China	3
Japan	0
Brazil	3
United States	0

Final
China	1
Brazil	3
Third place
Japan	3
United States	2

=== Semifinals ===
Date		Score		Set 1	Set 2	Set 3	Set 4	Set 5	Total
26 Jul	China	3–0	Japan	25–21	25–15	25–15			75–51
26 Jul	Brazil	3–0	United States	25–14	25–19	25–15			75–48

=== Bronze medal match ===
Date		Score		Set 1	Set 2	Set 3	Set 4	Set 5	Total
27 Jul	Japan	3–2	United States	25–16	14–25	25–17	20–25	25–23	109–106

=== Gold medal match ===
Date		Score		Set 1	Set 2	Set 3	Set 4	Set 5	Total
27 Jul	China	1–3	Brazil	22–25	26–24	24–26	14–25		86–100

== Final standing ==
Rank	Team
1st place, gold medalist(s)	Brazil
2nd place, silver medalist(s)	China
3rd place, bronze medalist(s)	Japan
4	United States
5	Italy
6	Ukraine
7	Germany
8	Thailand
9	Puerto Rico
10	Croatia
11	Dominican Republic
12	Egypt

2007 FIVB Women's Junior World champions

Brazil
6th title

12–woman Roster
Erica Adachi, Camila Brait, Camila Monteiro, Betina Schmidt (c), Silvana Papini, Priscila Daroit, Natalia Pereira, Amanda Francisco, Reneta Maggioni, Maria Silva, Tandara Caixeta, Ingrid Felix
Head coach
Luizomar Moura

== Individual awards ==
- MVP: (Brazil) Natalia Pereira
- Best scorer: (Brazil) Natalia Pereira
- Best spiker: (Brazil) Natalia Pereira
- Best blocker: (Brazil) Camila Monteiro
- Best server: (United States) Kelly Murphy
- Best setter: (Japan) Miho Watanabe
- Best libero: (Brazil) Camila Brait
