= 2026 FIVB Volleyball Girls' U17 World Championship =

Tournament details
- Host country: Chile
- Cities: Santiago; San Felipe; Los Andes
- Dates: 6–16 August 2026
- Teams: 24 (from 5 confederations)
- Venue: 4 (in 3 host cities)

Final positions
- Champions: United States (1st title)
- Runners-up: Turkey
- Third place: China
- Fourth place: Chinese Taipei

Tournament awards
- MVP: (United States) Kari Knotts

Tournament statistics
- Matches played: 104
- Attendance: 73,015 (702 per match)

The 2026 FIVB Volleyball Girls' U17 World Championship was the second edition of the FIVB Volleyball Girls' U17 World Championship, the biennial international youth volleyball championship contested by the women's national teams under the age of 17 of the members associations of the Fédération Internationale de Volleyball (FIVB), the sport's global governing body. It was held in Chile from 6 to 16 August 2026.

The United States won their first title, after defeating Turkey 3–0 in the final.

== Host selection ==
On 17 April 2025, FIVB opened the bidding process for member associations interested in hosting one of the two U17 World Championships in 2026 (i.e., Girls' or Boys' U17 World Championships) planned to take place in August 2026. The expression of interest of the member associations had to be submitted to FIVB no later than 18:00 CEST (UTC+2) on 30 May 2025.

FIVB announced the hosts for both Girls' and Boys' U17 World Championships on 1 July 2025, with Chile being selected to host the second edition of the Girls' U17 World Championship. According to the President of the Volleyball Federation of Chile (FEVOCHI) Jorge Pino, the Chilean bid competed with two other Asian bids. It marked the first time that Chile hosts an FIVB World Championship in any of its categories.

== Teams ==
=== Qualification ===
A total of 24 national teams qualified for the final tournament. In addition to the host Chile and defending champions China which qualified automatically, 20 other teams qualify through five separate continental competitions which had to be completed before 31 December 2025. Two remaining teams entered the tournament via the Girls' U17 FIVB World Ranking (as of 31 December 2025) among the teams not yet qualified.

The slot allocation was set as follows:

- Defending champion (China): 1
- Host (Chile): 1
- AVC (Asia & Oceania): 4
- CAVB (Africa): 3
- CEV (Europe): 6
- CSV (South America): 3
- NORCECA (North, Central America and Caribbean): 4
- Top teams not yet qualified as per Girls' U17 FIVB World Ranking: 2

=== Qualified teams ===
The following twenty-four teams qualified for the tournament.

Confederation	Qualifying tournament / Method of qualification	Team qualified	Previous appearances			Previous best performance
Confederation	Qualifying tournament / Method of qualification	Team qualified	Total	First	Last	Previous best performance
AVC (Asia & Oceania)	Defending champions	China	1	2024		Champions (2024)
AVC (Asia & Oceania)	2025 Asian Women's U16 Championship ( (Jordan) Amman, 1–8 November)	Japan	1	2024		Runners-up (2024)
AVC (Asia & Oceania)	2025 Asian Women's U16 Championship ( (Jordan) Amman, 1–8 November)	Chinese Taipei	1	2024		Fourth place (2024)
AVC (Asia & Oceania)	2025 Asian Women's U16 Championship ( (Jordan) Amman, 1–8 November)	South Korea	0	None		Debut
AVC (Asia & Oceania)	2025 Asian Women's U16 Championship ( (Jordan) Amman, 1–8 November)	Philippines	0	None		Debut
AVC (Asia & Oceania)	Girls' U17 FIVB World Ranking	Thailand	1	2024		Eleventh place (2024)
CAVB (Africa)	2025 Girls' U16 African Nations Championship ( (Tunisia) Tunis, 24–30 August)	Egypt	1	2024		Fourteenth place (2024)
CAVB (Africa)	2025 Girls' U16 African Nations Championship ( (Tunisia) Tunis, 24–30 August)	Tunisia	0	None		Debut
CAVB (Africa)	2025 Girls' U16 African Nations Championship ( (Tunisia) Tunis, 24–30 August)	Algeria	0	None		Debut
CEV (Europe)	2025 Women's U16 European Championship ( (Albania) Tirana and (Kosovo) Pristina, 2–13 July)	Czech Republic	0	None		Debut
CEV (Europe)	2025 Women's U16 European Championship ( (Albania) Tirana and (Kosovo) Pristina, 2–13 July)	Italy	1	2024		Third place (2024)
CEV (Europe)	2025 Women's U16 European Championship ( (Albania) Tirana and (Kosovo) Pristina, 2–13 July)	Poland	0	None		Debut
CEV (Europe)	2025 Women's U16 European Championship ( (Albania) Tirana and (Kosovo) Pristina, 2–13 July)	Turkey	1	2024		Seventh place (2024)
CEV (Europe)	2025 Women's U16 European Championship ( (Albania) Tirana and (Kosovo) Pristina, 2–13 July)	Croatia	1	2024		Twelfth place (2024)
CEV (Europe)	2025 Women's U16 European Championship ( (Albania) Tirana and (Kosovo) Pristina, 2–13 July)	Spain	0	None		Debut
CSV (South America)	Host nation	Chile	0	None		Debut
CSV (South America)	2025 Girls' U17 South American Championship ( (Peru) Lima, 17–21 September)	Peru	1	2024		Sixth place (2024)
CSV (South America)	2025 Girls' U17 South American Championship ( (Peru) Lima, 17–21 September)	Brazil	1	2024		Fifth place (2024)
CSV (South America)	2025 Girls' U17 South American Championship ( (Peru) Lima, 17–21 September)	Venezuela	0	None		Debut
CSV (South America)	Girls' U17 FIVB World Ranking	Argentina	1	2024		Tenth place (2024)
NORCECA (North, Central America and Caribbean)	2025 Girls' U17 NORCECA Continental Championship ( (Costa Rica) San José, 4–9 November)	United States	0	None		Debut
NORCECA (North, Central America and Caribbean)	2025 Girls' U17 NORCECA Continental Championship ( (Costa Rica) San José, 4–9 November)	Dominican Republic	1	2024		Fifteenth place (2024)
NORCECA (North, Central America and Caribbean)	2025 Girls' U17 NORCECA Continental Championship ( (Costa Rica) San José, 4–9 November)	Puerto Rico	1	2024		Ninth place (2024)
NORCECA (North, Central America and Caribbean)	2025 Girls' U17 NORCECA Continental Championship ( (Costa Rica) San José, 4–9 November)	Mexico	1	2024		Eighth place (2024)

== Pools composition ==
External videos
- Drawing Of Lots - 2026 FIVB Volleyball Girls' U17 World Championship

=== Seeding ===
Girls' U17 FIVB World Ranking of each team as of 13 November 2025 are shown in brackets, except the hosts Chile who ranked 22nd.

Seeded teams		Unseeded teams to be drawn			
Line 1	Line 2	Pot 1 (line 3)	Pot 2 (line 4)	Pot 3 (line 5)	Pot 4 (line 6)
Chile (Hosts, assigned to A1); China (1), assigned to B1; Japan (2), assigned to C1; Italy (3), assigned to D1	Chinese Taipei (4), assigned to D2; Brazil (5), assigned to C2; Peru (6), assigned to B2; Turkey (7), assigned to A2	Mexico (8); Puerto Rico (9); Egypt (10); Argentina (11)	South Korea (12); Poland (12); United States (12); Venezuela (12)	Croatia (16); Dominican Republic (16); Thailand (18); Tunisia (20)	Algeria (21); Czech Republic (22); Philippines (25); Spain (27)

=== Draw ===
The draw procedure for the pools composition also followed the serpentine system and was as follows:

- Teams from pot 4 were drawn first and were placed in line 64 of each pool starting from pool A to pool D.
- Teams from pot 3 were then drawn at the end and were placed in line 53 of each pool starting from pool D to pool A.
- Teams from pot 2 were then drawn and placed in line 4 of each pool starting from pool A to pool D.
- Teams from pot 1 were drawn at the end and were placed in line 3 of each pool starting from pool D to pool A.

The pools composition after the draw was as follow:

Pool A
Pos	Team
A1	Chile
A2	Turkey
A3	Egypt
A4	United States
A5	Thailand
A6	Czech Republic

Pool B
Pos	Team
B1	China
B2	Peru
B3	Mexico
B4	Venezuela
B5	Tunisia
B6	Philippines

Pool C
Pos	Team
C1	Japan
C2	Brazil
C3	Argentina
C4	Poland
C5	Croatia
C6	Spain

Pool D
Pos	Team
D1	Italy
D2	Chinese Taipei
D3	Puerto Rico
D4	South Korea
D5	Dominican Republic
D6	Algeria

== Venues ==
In July 2025, FEVOCHI President Jorge Pino confirmed Santiago as a host city and announced three other potential venues: Viña del Mar/Valparaíso, Rancagua, San Felipe and Los Andes, each hosting one group of six teams.

In May 2026, Volleyball World confirmed San Felipe and Los Andes as the other venues for the tournament.

Santiago		Location map of the venues
National Stadium Park Court 1	National Stadium Park Court 2	Location map of the venues
Capacity: 2,400		Location map of the venues
San Felipe	Los Andes	Location map of the venues
Curimon Gymanasium	Juan Muñoz Herrera Gymnasium	Location map of the venues
Capacity: 2,500	Capacity:	Location map of the venues

== Preliminary round ==
- All times are Chile Standard Time (UTC−04:00).

=== Pool A ===
Pos	Team	Pld	W	L	Pts	SW	SL	SR	SPW	SPL	SPR	Qualification
1	United States	5	5	0	15	15	0	MAX	375	242	1.550	Round of 16
2	Turkey	5	4	1	12	12	3	4.000	347	273	1.271	Round of 16
3	Czech Republic	5	3	2	9	9	8	1.125	355	376	0.944	Round of 16
4	Thailand	5	2	3	6	7	10	0.700	357	374	0.955	Round of 16
5	Chile (H)	5	1	4	3	4	13	0.308	326	394	0.827	17th–24th places
6	Egypt	5	0	5	0	2	15	0.133	316	417	0.758	17th–24th places

Source: FIVB Volleyball Girls' U17 World Championship 2026 - Standings
(H) Host

Date	Time		Score		Set 1	Set 2	Set 3	Set 4	Set 5	Total	Attd	Report
6 Aug	14:00	Egypt	0–3	United States	13–25	23–25	17–25			53–75	456	P2 Report
6 Aug	17:00	Turkey	3–0	Thailand	25–13	25–19	25–15			75–47	892	P2 Report
6 Aug	20:00	Chile	0–3	Czech Republic	18–25	15–25	21–25			54–75	2,250	P2 Report
7 Aug	14:00	Turkey	0–3	United States	12–25	18–25	17–25			47–75	450	P2 Report
7 Aug	17:00	Egypt	1–3	Czech Republic	13–25	20–25	25–20	21–25		79–95	1,150	P2 Report
7 Aug	20:00	Chile	1–3	Thailand	25–19	20–25	17–25	15–25		77–94	2,325	P2 Report
8 Aug	14:00	Turkey	3–0	Egypt	25–20	25–15	25–19			75–54	515	P2 Report
8 Aug	17:00	Thailand	1–3	Czech Republic	23–25	25–17	23–25	22–25		93–92	1,435	P2 Report
8 Aug	20:00	Chile	0–3	United States	14–25	21–25	19–25			54–75	1,828	P2 Report
10 Aug	14:00	United States	3–0	Thailand	25–11	25–21	25–16			75–48	494	P2 Report
10 Aug	17:00	Turkey	3–0	Czech Republic	25–16	25–20	25–17			75–53	985	P2 Report
10 Aug	20:00	Chile	3–1	Egypt	22–25	25–10	25–20	25–20		97–75	1,869	P2 Report
11 Aug	14:00	United States	3–0	Czech Republic	25–10	25–13	25–17			75–40	387	P2 Report
11 Aug	17:00	Egypt	0–3	Thailand	15–25	20–25	20–25			55–75	746	P2 Report
11 Aug	20:00	Chile	0–3	Turkey	16–25	15–25	13–25			44–75	1,522	P2 Report

=== Pool B ===
Pos	Team	Pld	W	L	Pts	SW	SL	SR	SPW	SPL	SPR	Qualification
1	China	5	5	0	15	15	0	MAX	375	227	1.652	Round of 16
2	Venezuela	5	3	2	9	11	9	1.222	430	397	1.083	Round of 16
3	Peru	5	3	2	8	10	9	1.111	424	433	0.979	Round of 16
4	Philippines	5	2	3	7	9	10	0.900	413	427	0.967	Round of 16
5	Mexico	5	2	3	6	9	11	0.818	402	435	0.924	17th–24th places
6	Tunisia	5	0	5	0	0	15	0.000	255	380	0.671	17th–24th places

Source: FIVB Volleyball Girls' U17 World Championship 2026 - Standings

Date	Time		Score		Set 1	Set 2	Set 3	Set 4	Set 5	Total	Attd	Report
6 Aug	14:00	Mexico	3–2	Venezuela	25–21	10–25	15–25	25–20	15–7	90–98	1,400	P2 Report
6 Aug	17:00	Peru	3–0	Tunisia	25–21	26–24	25–14			76–59	700	P2 Report
6 Aug	20:00	China	3–0	Philippines	25–18	25–21	25–13			75–52	600	P2 Report
7 Aug	14:00	Peru	1–3	Venezuela	23–25	25–23	25–27	20–25		93–100	980	P2 Report
7 Aug	17:00	Mexico	1–3	Philippines	19–25	25–20	18–25	23–25		85–95	610	P2 Report
7 Aug	20:00	China	3–0	Tunisia	25–8	25–10	25–14			75–32	570	P2 Report
8 Aug	14:00	Peru	3–2	Mexico	19–25	25–23	25–23	22–25	15–10	106–106	680	P2 Report
8 Aug	17:00	Tunisia	0–3	Philippines	25–27	19–25	16–25			60–77	400	P2 Report
8 Aug	20:00	China	3–0	Venezuela	25–19	25–19	25–13			75–51	2,000	P2 Report
10 Aug	14:00	Venezuela	3–0	Tunisia	25–12	25–10	25–21			75–43	700	P2 Report
10 Aug	17:00	Peru	3–1	Philippines	26–28	25–22	25–23	25–20		101–93	420	P2 Report
10 Aug	20:00	China	3–0	Mexico	25–12	25–15	25–17			75–44	580	P2 Report
11 Aug	14:00	Venezuela	3–2	Philippines	25–19	25–16	22–25	19–25	15–11	106–96	900	P2 Report
11 Aug	17:00	Mexico	3–0	Tunisia	25–19	25–17	27–25			77–61	180	P2 Report
11 Aug	20:00	China	3–0	Peru	25–13	25–15	25–20			75–48	690	P2 Report

=== Pool C ===
Pos	Team	Pld	W	L	Pts	SW	SL	SR	SPW	SPL	SPR	Qualification
1	Poland	5	5	0	14	15	3	5.000	432	324	1.333	Round of 16
2	Croatia	5	3	2	8	9	10	0.900	399	430	0.928	Round of 16
3	Japan	5	2	3	7	10	10	1.000	430	448	0.960	Round of 16
4	Argentina	5	2	3	6	8	9	0.889	378	371	1.019	Round of 16
5	Spain	5	2	3	4	7	13	0.538	418	460	0.909	17th–24th places
6	Brazil	5	1	4	6	9	13	0.692	463	487	0.951	17th–24th places

Source: FIVB Volleyball Girls' U17 World Championship 2026 - Standings

Date	Time		Score		Set 1	Set 2	Set 3	Set 4	Set 5	Total	Attd	Report
6 Aug	14:00	Argentina	0–3	Poland	20–25	22–25	16–25			58–75	224	P2 Report
6 Aug	17:00	Brazil	2–3	Croatia	25–20	21–25	24–26	25–17	10–15	105–103	458	P2 Report
6 Aug	20:00	Japan	2–3	Spain	18–25	25–9	25–23	24–26	6–15	98–98	286	P2 Report
7 Aug	14:00	Brazil	2–3	Poland	25–22	14–25	17–25	25–23	10–15	91–110	285	P2 Report
7 Aug	17:00	Argentina	3–0	Spain	25–22	25–17	25–22			75–61	413	P2 Report
7 Aug	20:00	Japan	3–0	Croatia	26–24	25–22	25–18			76–64	420	P2 Report
8 Aug	14:00	Brazil	0–3	Argentina	17–25	19–25	20–25			56–75	450	P2 Report
8 Aug	17:00	Croatia	3–1	Spain	29–27	25–22	22–25	25–19		101–93	470	P2 Report
8 Aug	20:00	Japan	1–3	Poland	25–22	23–25	7–25	21–25		76–97	686	P2 Report
10 Aug	14:00	Poland	3–0	Croatia	25–14	25–16	25–18			75–48	100	P2 Report
10 Aug	17:00	Brazil	2–3	Spain	25–22	25–27	20–25	28–26	13–15	111–115	275	P2 Report
10 Aug	20:00	Japan	3–1	Argentina	27–25	25–16	19–25	25–23		96–89	435	P2 Report
11 Aug	14:00	Poland	3–0	Spain	25–13	25–18	25–20			75–51	127	P2 Report
11 Aug	17:00	Argentina	1–3	Croatia	19–25	15–25	25–8	22–25		81–83	275	P2 Report
11 Aug	20:00	Japan	1–3	Brazil	27–25	22–25	21–25	14–25		84–100	435	P2 Report

=== Pool D ===
Pos	Team	Pld	W	L	Pts	SW	SL	SR	SPW	SPL	SPR	Qualification
1	South Korea	5	5	0	15	15	4	3.750	447	356	1.256	Round of 16
2	Italy	5	4	1	11	13	6	2.167	436	353	1.235	Round of 16
3	Chinese Taipei	5	2	3	8	11	9	1.222	427	402	1.062	Round of 16
4	Dominican Republic	5	2	3	6	8	10	0.800	387	388	0.997	Round of 16
5	Puerto Rico	5	2	3	5	8	11	0.727	395	408	0.968	17th–24th places
6	Algeria	5	0	5	0	0	15	0.000	180	375	0.480	17th–24th places

Source: FIVB Volleyball Girls' U17 World Championship 2026 - Standings

Date	Time		Score		Set 1	Set 2	Set 3	Set 4	Set 5	Total	Attd	Report
6 Aug	14:00	Puerto Rico	1–3	South Korea	10–25	23–25	25–19	24–26		82–95		P2 Report
6 Aug	17:00	Chinese Taipei	3–0	Dominican Republic	25–12	25–19	25–19			75–50	350	P2 Report
6 Aug	20:00	Italy	3–0	Algeria	25–8	25–5	25–10			75–23	300	P2 Report
7 Aug	14:00	Chinese Taipei	1–3	South Korea	19–25	25–18	13–25	15–25		72–93	400	P2 Report
7 Aug	17:00	Puerto Rico	3–0	Algeria	25–14	25–6	25–18			75–38	380	P2 Report
7 Aug	20:00	Italy	3–1	Dominican Republic	25–18	27–29	25–23	25–20		102–90	420	P2 Report
8 Aug	14:00	Chinese Taipei	2–3	Puerto Rico	25–23	21–25	24–26	25–18	12–15	107–107	400	P2 Report
8 Aug	17:00	Dominican Republic	3–0	Algeria	25–9	25–12	25–17			75–38	300	P2 Report
8 Aug	20:00	Italy	1–3	South Korea	14–25	19–25	25–13	20–25		78–88	420	P2 Report
10 Aug	14:00	South Korea	3–1	Dominican Republic	25–18	21–25	25–19	25–17		96–79	450	P2 Report
10 Aug	17:00	Chinese Taipei	3–0	Algeria	25–10	25–17	25–9			75–36	250	P2 Report
10 Aug	20:00	Italy	3–0	Puerto Rico	25–18	25–21	25–15			75–54	350	P2 Report
11 Aug	14:00	South Korea	3–0	Algeria	25–10	25–17	25–18			75–45	370	P2 Report
11 Aug	17:00	Puerto Rico	1–3	Dominican Republic	23–25	12–25	25–18	17–25		77–93	300	P2 Report
11 Aug	20:00	Italy	3–2	Chinese Taipei	19–25	25–21	22–25	25–15	15–12	106–98	300	P2 Report

== Final round ==
- All times are Chile Standard Time (UTC−04:00).

=== 17th–24th places ===
21st place match
15 August – San Felipe
Chile	0
Puerto Rico	3
23rd place match
15 August – San Felipe
Algeria	0
Egypt	3

21st–24th semi-finals
14 August – San Felipe
Chile	3
Algeria	0
14 August – San Felipe
Egypt	2
Puerto Rico	3

17th–24th quarter-finals
12 August – Santiago
Chile	1
Brazil	3
12 August – Los Andes
Mexico	3
Algeria	0
12 August – Santiago
Spain	3
Egypt	1
12 August – Los Andes
Puerto Rico	2
Tunisia	3

17th–20th semi-finals
14 August – Los Andes
Brazil	3
Mexico	1
14 August – Los Andes
Spain	3
Tunisia	0

17th place match
15 August – Los Andes
Brazil	3
Spain	1
19th place match
15 August – Los Andes
Mexico	3
Tunisia	0

==== 17th–24th quarter-finals ====
Date	Time		Score		Set 1	Set 2	Set 3	Set 4	Set 5	Total	Attd	Report
12 Aug	14:00	Chile	1–3	Brazil	14–25	25–20	11–25	12–25		62–95	825	P2 Report
12 Aug	14:00	Spain	3–1	Egypt	25–21	23–25	25–12	25–16		98–74	237	P2 Report
12 Aug	14:00	Mexico	3–0	Algeria	25–12	25–16	25–18			75–46	420	P2 Report
12 Aug	17:00	Puerto Rico	2–3	Tunisia	24–26	22–25	25–17	25–13	12–15	108–96	220	P2 Report

==== 21st–24th semi-finals ====
Date	Time		Score		Set 1	Set 2	Set 3	Set 4	Set 5	Total	Attd	Report
14 Aug	17:00	Egypt	2–3	Puerto Rico	18–25	25–15	22–25	25–20	8–15	98–100	1,490	P2 Report
14 Aug	20:00	Chile	3–0	Algeria	25–17	25–15	25–16			75–48	2,500	P2 Report

==== 17th–20th semi-finals ====
Date	Time		Score		Set 1	Set 2	Set 3	Set 4	Set 5	Total	Attd	Report
14 Aug	17:00	Brazil	3–1	Mexico	25–21	23–25	25–15	25–10		98–71	300	P2 Report
14 Aug	20:00	Spain	3–0	Tunisia	25–18	25–17	25–20			75–55	250	P2 Report

==== 23rd place match ====
Date	Time		Score		Set 1	Set 2	Set 3	Set 4	Set 5	Total	Attd	Report
15 Aug	17:00	Algeria	0–3	Egypt	9–25	16–25	16–25			41–75	1,100	P2 Report

==== 21st place match ====
Date	Time		Score		Set 1	Set 2	Set 3	Set 4	Set 5	Total	Attd	Report
15 Aug	20:00	Chile	0–3	Puerto Rico	16–25	23–25	23–25			62–75	2,500	P2 Report

==== 19th place match ====
Date	Time		Score		Set 1	Set 2	Set 3	Set 4	Set 5	Total	Attd	Report
15 Aug	17:00	Mexico	3–0	Tunisia	25–23	25–19	25–13			75–55		P2 Report

==== 17th place match ====
Date	Time		Score		Set 1	Set 2	Set 3	Set 4	Set 5	Total	Attd	Report
15 Aug	20:00	Brazil	3–1	Spain	24–26	25–23	27–25	25–16		101–90	480	P2 Report

=== 1st–16th places ===
Ninth place match
16 August – Santiago
Dominican Republic	1
Poland	3
11th place match
16 August – Santiago
Argentina	1
Japan	3
13th place match
16 August – Santiago
Peru	3
Venezuela	0
15th place match
16 August – Santiago
Czech Republic	1
Philippines	3

9th–12th semi-finals
15 August – Santiago
Argentina	2
Dominican Republic	3
15 August – Santiago
Poland	3
Japan	0
13th–16th semi-finals
15 August – Santiago
Peru	3
Czech Republic	2
15 August – Santiago
Venezuela	3
Philippines	1

9th–16th quarter-finals
14 August – Santiago
Peru	2
Argentina	3
14 August – Santiago
Czech Republic	1
Dominican Republic	3
14 August – Santiago
Venezuela	0
Poland	3
14 August – Santiago
Japan	3
Philippines	0

Round of 16
12 August – San Felipe
Italy	3
Peru	0
12 August – Santiago
United States	3
Argentina	0
12 August – Santiago
Croatia	3
Czech Republic	0
12 August – San Felipe
China	3
Dominican Republic	1
12 August – San Felipe
Venezuela	0
Chinese Taipei	3
12 August – Santiago
Poland	1
Thailand	3
12 August – Santiago
Turkey	3
Japan	0
12 August – Los Andes
South Korea	3
Philippines	0

Quarter-finals
14 August – Santiago
Italy	0
United States	3
14 August – Santiago
Croatia	2
China	3
14 August – Santiago
Chinese Taipei	3
Thailand	2
14 August – Santiago
Turkey	3
South Korea	1

Semi-finals
15 August – Santiago
United States	3
China	0
15 August – Santiago
Chinese Taipei	0
Turkey	3
5th–8th semi-finals
15 August – Santiago
Italy	3
Croatia	0
15 August – Santiago
Thailand	0
South Korea	3

Final
16 August – Santiago
United States	3
Turkey	0
Third place match
16 August – Santiago
China	3
Chinese Taipei	1
Fifth place match
16 August – Santiago
Italy	3
South Korea	1
Seventh place match
16 August – Santiago
Croatia	0
Thailand	3

==== Round of 16 ====
Date	Time		Score		Set 1	Set 2	Set 3	Set 4	Set 5	Total	Attd	Report
12 Aug	14:00	Italy	3–0	Peru	25–13	25–11	25–13			75–37	1,800	P2 Report
12 Aug	17:00	Croatia	3–0	Czech Republic	25–21	25–21	25–19			75–61	375	P2 Report
12 Aug	17:00	China	3–1	Dominican Republic	25–18	17–25	25–19	25–17		92–79	460	P2 Report
12 Aug	17:00	Turkey	3–0	Japan	25–18	25–7	25–23			75–48	1,109	P2 Report
12 Aug	20:00	United States	3–0	Argentina	25–15	25–23	25–15			75–53	578	P2 Report
12 Aug	20:00	Venezuela	0–3	Chinese Taipei	21–25	19–25	22–25			62–75	700	P2 Report
12 Aug	20:00	Poland	1–3	Thailand	19–25	21–25	25–10	23–25		88–85	1,334	P2 Report
12 Aug	20:00	South Korea	3–0	Philippines	25–21	25–18	25–14			75–53	300	P2 Report

==== 9th–16th quarter-finals ====
Date	Time		Score		Set 1	Set 2	Set 3	Set 4	Set 5	Total	Attd	Report
14 Aug	11:00	Peru	2–3	Argentina	29–27	16–25	18–25	25–18	11–15	99–110	197	P2 Report
14 Aug	14:00	Czech Republic	1–3	Dominican Republic	25–23	22–25	23–25	15–25		85–98	274	P2 Report
14 Aug	17:00	Venezuela	0–3	Poland	8–25	21–25	16–25			45–75	382	P2 Report
14 Aug	20:00	Japan	3–0	Philippines	25–23	25–19	25–16			75–58	548	P2 Report

==== Quarter-finals ====
Date	Time		Score		Set 1	Set 2	Set 3	Set 4	Set 5	Total	Attd	Report
14 Aug	11:00	Italy	0–3	United States	10–25	15–25	24–26			49–76	464	P2 Report
14 Aug	14:00	Croatia	2–3	China	23–25	21–25	25–20	25–19	7–15	101–104	709	P2 Report
14 Aug	17:00	Chinese Taipei	3–2	Thailand	15–25	26–24	29–27	22–25	15–7	107–108	1,196	P2 Report
14 Aug	20:00	Turkey	3–1	South Korea	21–25	27–25	25–22	25–17		98–89	1,485	P2 Report

==== 13th–16th semi-finals ====
Date	Time		Score		Set 1	Set 2	Set 3	Set 4	Set 5	Total	Attd	Report
15 Aug	11:00	Peru	3–2	Czech Republic	25–18	19–25	20–25	25–17	15–10	104–95	213	P2 Report
15 Aug	14:00	Venezuela	3–1	Philippines	25–22	25–15	20–25	25–22		95–84	323	P2 Report

==== 9th–12th semi-finals ====
Date	Time		Score		Set 1	Set 2	Set 3	Set 4	Set 5	Total	Attd	Report
15 Aug	17:00	Argentina	2–3	Dominican Republic	21–25	27–25	25–17	16–25	15–17	104–109	502	P2 Report
15 Aug	20:00	Poland	3–0	Japan	25–15	25–21	25–19			75–55	537	P2 Report

==== 5th–8th semi-finals ====
Date	Time		Score		Set 1	Set 2	Set 3	Set 4	Set 5	Total	Attd	Report
15 Aug	11:00	Italy	3–0	Croatia	25–14	25–18	25–8			75–40	721	P2 Report
15 Aug	14:00	Thailand	0–3	South Korea	19–25	15–25	11–25			45–75	862	P2 Report

==== Semi-finals ====
Date	Time		Score		Set 1	Set 2	Set 3	Set 4	Set 5	Total	Attd	Report
15 Aug	17:00	United States	3–0	China	25–13	25–15	25–19			75–47	1,452	P2 Report
15 Aug	20:00	Chinese Taipei	0–3	Turkey	15–25	22–25	22–25			59–75	1,605	P2 Report

==== 15th place match ====
Date	Time		Score		Set 1	Set 2	Set 3	Set 4	Set 5	Total	Attd	Report
16 Aug	09:00	Czech Republic	1–3	Philippines	25–21	22–25	14–25	22–25		83–96	53	P2 Report

==== 13th place match ====
Date	Time		Score		Set 1	Set 2	Set 3	Set 4	Set 5	Total	Attd	Report
16 Aug	12:00	Peru	3–0	Venezuela	25–20	25–11	25–17			75–48	222	P2 Report

==== 11th place match ====
Date	Time		Score		Set 1	Set 2	Set 3	Set 4	Set 5	Total	Attd	Report
16 Aug	15:00	Argentina	1–3	Japan	21–25	21–25	25–22	19–25		86–97	397	P2 Report

==== Ninth place match ====
Date	Time		Score		Set 1	Set 2	Set 3	Set 4	Set 5	Total	Attd	Report
16 Aug	18:00	Dominican Republic	1–3	Poland	16–25	22–25	25–23	16–25		79–98	497	P2 Report

==== Seventh place match ====
Date	Time		Score		Set 1	Set 2	Set 3	Set 4	Set 5	Total	Attd	Report
16 Aug	10:00	Croatia	0–3	Thailand	21–25	10–25	24–26			55–76	293	P2 Report

==== Fifth place match ====
Date	Time		Score		Set 1	Set 2	Set 3	Set 4	Set 5	Total	Attd	Report
16 Aug	13:00	Italy	3–1	South Korea	25–20	24–26	25–20	25–14		99–80	590	P2 Report

==== Third place match ====
Date	Time		Score		Set 1	Set 2	Set 3	Set 4	Set 5	Total	Attd	Report
16 Aug	16:00	China	3–1	Chinese Taipei	26–28	25–15	25–19	25–22		101–84	1,358	P2 Report

==== Final ====
Date	Time		Score		Set 1	Set 2	Set 3	Set 4	Set 5	Total	Attd	Report
16 Aug	19:00	United States	3–0	Turkey	25–23	25–11	25–23			75–57	2,204	P2 Report

== Final standing ==
Rank	Team
1st place, gold medalist(s)	United States
2nd place, silver medalist(s)	Turkey
3rd place, bronze medalist(s)	China
4	Chinese Taipei
5	Italy
6	South Korea
7	Thailand
8	Croatia
9	Poland
10	Dominican Republic
11	Japan
12	Argentina
13	Peru
14	Venezuela
15	Philippines
16	Czech Republic
17	Brazil
18	Spain
19	Mexico
20	Tunisia
21	Puerto Rico
22	Chile
23	Egypt
24	Algeria

Qualified for the 2028 World Championship

2026 FIVB Volleyball Girls' U17 World champions

United States
First title

14–girl roster
Lexi Coleman, Kaelyn Easton, Ellie Enger (c), Madlen Gloessner, Kari Knotts, Grace Hengler, Taylor Johnson, Julia Masselink, Madison Middleton, Maya Ogbogu, Brynli Burgess, Maija Mortensen, Peyton Smith, Kaya Young
Head coach
Heather Olmstead
