= 2025 Asian Women's U16 Volleyball Championship =

Youth volleyball championship

2025 Asian Women's U16 Championship
Tournament details
- Host country: Jordan
- City: Amman
- Dates: 1–8 November
- Teams: 14
- Venue: 2 (in 1 host city)

Final positions
- Champions: South Korea (1st title)
- Runners-up: Chinese Taipei
- Third place: China
- Fourth place: Japan

Tournament statistics
- Matches played: 44

The 2025 Asian Women's U16 Volleyball Championship was the second edition of the Asian Women's U16 Volleyball Championship which organised by Asian Volleyball Confederation (AVC) with Jordan Volleyball Federation. the tournament, originally scheduled for July 20 to 27, 2025, in Amman, Jordan, was postponed to November 1 to 8, 2025, due to the Twelve-Day War.

This tournament served as a qualification tournament for the FIVB Volleyball Girls' U17 World Championship. The top four teams and defending champions China qualified for the 2026 FIVB Volleyball Girls' U17 World Championship as the AVC representatives.

Players must be born on or after January 1, 2010.

== Pools composition ==
The draw for the pool composition took place on 25 May 2025 at the Edsa Shangri-La, Manila in Mandaluyong, Philippines.

Pool A	Pool B	Pool C	Pool D
Jordan	Japan	China	Chinese Taipei
Uzbekistan	Iran	Kazakhstan	Thailand
~~Lebanon~~*	~~Saudi Arabia~~*	Qatar	Australia
Hong Kong	Philippines	South Korea	India

* Lebanon and Saudi Arabia withdrew from the tournament.

== Venue ==
Preliminary, Classification 1st–8th	Preliminary, Classification 9th–14th
Amman
Prince Hamza Arena (Court 1)	Princess Sumaya Hall (Court 2)
Capacity: 6,000	Capacity: 1,200

== Format ==
In preliminary round, all teams are divided into four pools (A, B, C, & D) with four teams each. The teams battled in a single round-robin with the top two teams in each pool qualified to 1st–8th classification while bottom two teams qualified to 9th–16th classification.

In classification round, all teams in each pools (E, F, G, & H) battle again in a single round-robin where top two teams in pools E and F qualify to semifinals and the two bottom teams qualify to 5th–8th places, while the top two teams in pools G and H qualify to 9th–12th places and 13th–16th places, respectively. Teams who faced each other in the preliminary will not play again rather their win-loss record will carry over.

In final round, the teams battle in knockout format.

== Pool standing procedure ==
1. Number of Victories
2. Match points
3. Set quotient
4. Points quotient
5. If the tie continues as per the point quotient between two teams, the priority will be given to the team which won the last match between them. When the tie in points quotient is between three or more teams, a new classification of these teams in the terms of points 1, 2 and 3 will be made taking into consideration only the matches in which they were opposed to each other.

Match won 3–0 or 3–1: 3 match points for the winner, 0 match points for the loser
Match won 3–2: 2 match points for the winner, 1 match point for the loser

== Preliminary round ==
Due to late cancellations, all matches between Saudi Arabia and Lebanon were declared 3–0 in favor of the rivals.

- All times are Arabia Standard Time (UTC+03:00).

=== Pool A ===
Pos	Team	Pld	W	L	Pts	SW	SL	SR	SPW	SPL	SPR	Qualification
1	Hong Kong	2	2	0	6	6	1	6.000	173	118	1.466	Pool E
2	Uzbekistan	2	1	1	3	4	3	1.333	155	146	1.062	Pool E
3	Jordan (H)	2	0	2	0	0	6	0.000	86	150	0.573	Pool G
4	Lebanon	3	0	3	0	0	9	0.000	0	225	0.000	Pool G

Source: VIS Live Center
(H) Host

Date	Time	Venue		Score		Set 1	Set 2	Set 3	Set 4	Set 5	Total	Report
1 Nov	18:00	Court 1	Uzbekistan	1–3	Hong Kong	16–25	25–23	21–25	18–25		80–98	Report
2 Nov	18:00	Court 1	Jordan	0–3	Hong Kong	10–25	11–25	17–25			38–75	Report
3 Nov	18:00	Court 1	Jordan	0–3	Uzbekistan	17–25	19–25	12–25			48–75	Report

=== Pool B ===
Pos	Team	Pld	W	L	Pts	SW	SL	SR	SPW	SPL	SPR	Qualification
1	Japan	2	2	0	6	6	1	6.000	171	125	1.368	Pool F
2	Philippines	2	1	1	3	4	3	1.333	153	161	0.950	Pool F
3	Iran	2	0	2	0	0	6	0.000	112	150	0.747	Pool H
4	Saudi Arabia	3	0	3	0	0	9	0.000	0	225	0.000	Pool H

Source: VIS Live Center

Date	Time	Venue		Score		Set 1	Set 2	Set 3	Set 4	Set 5	Total	Report
1 Nov	18:00	Court 2	Japan	3–1	Philippines	25–17	21–25	25–16	25–20		96–78	Report
2 Nov	18:00	Court 2	Iran	0–3	Philippines	21–25	22–25	22–25			65–75	Report
3 Nov	18:00	Court 2	Japan	3–0	Iran	25–15	25–19	25–13			75–47	Report

=== Pool C ===
Pos	Team	Pld	W	L	Pts	SW	SL	SR	SPW	SPL	SPR	Qualification
1	China	3	3	0	8	9	2	4.500	245	165	1.485	Pool E
2	South Korea	3	2	1	7	8	3	2.667	252	153	1.647	Pool E
3	Kazakhstan	3	1	2	3	3	6	0.500	170	169	1.006	Pool G
4	Qatar	3	0	3	0	0	9	0.000	45	225	0.200	Pool G

Source: VIS Live Center

Date	Time	Venue		Score		Set 1	Set 2	Set 3	Set 4	Set 5	Total	Report
1 Nov	13:00	Court 1	China	3–2	South Korea	11–25	25–20	19–25	25–19	15–13	95–102	Report
1 Nov	15:30	Court 1	Kazakhstan	3–0	Qatar	25–8	25–6	25–5			75–19	Report
2 Nov	13:00	Court 1	Kazakhstan	0–3	South Korea	18–25	13–25	14–25			45–75	Report
2 Nov	15:30	Court 1	China	3–0	Qatar	25–2	25–6	25–5			75–13	Report
3 Nov	13:00	Court 1	Qatar	0–3	South Korea	5–25	4–25	4–25			13–75	Report
3 Nov	15:30	Court 1	China	3–0	Kazakhstan	25–17	25–22	25–11			75–50	Report

=== Pool D ===
Pos	Team	Pld	W	L	Pts	SW	SL	SR	SPW	SPL	SPR	Qualification
1	Chinese Taipei	3	3	0	9	9	1	9.000	247	132	1.871	Pool F
2	Thailand	3	2	1	6	7	3	2.333	234	159	1.472	Pool F
3	Australia	3	1	2	3	3	6	0.500	156	200	0.780	Pool H
4	India	3	0	3	0	0	9	0.000	79	225	0.351	Pool H

Source: VIS Live Center

Date	Time	Venue		Score		Set 1	Set 2	Set 3	Set 4	Set 5	Total	Report
1 Nov	13:00	Court 2	Chinese Taipei	3–0	India	25–0	25–0	25–0			75–0	Report
1 Nov	15:30	Court 2	Thailand	3–0	Australia	25–12	25–10	25–11			75–33	Report
2 Nov	13:00	Court 2	Thailand	3–0	India	25–7	25–12	25–10			75–29	Report
2 Nov	15:30	Court 2	Chinese Taipei	3–0	Australia	25–19	25–15	25–14			75–48	Report
3 Nov	13:00	Court 2	Australia	3–0	India	25–17	25–15	25–18			75–50	Report
3 Nov	15:30	Court 2	Chinese Taipei	3–1	Thailand	25–18	22–25	25–18	25–23		97–84	Report

== Classification round ==
- All times are Arabia Standard Time (UTC+03:00).
- The results and the points of the matches between the same teams that were already played during the preliminary round shall be taken into account for the classification round.

=== Pool E ===
Pos	Team	Pld	W	L	Pts	SW	SL	SR	SPW	SPL	SPR	Qualification
1	China	3	3	0	8	9	2	4.500	245	173	1.416	Final four
2	South Korea	3	2	1	7	8	3	2.667	252	167	1.509	Final four
3	Hong Kong	3	1	2	3	3	7	0.429	175	230	0.761	5th–8th places
4	Uzbekistan	3	0	3	0	1	9	0.111	146	248	0.589	5th–8th places

Source: VIS Live Center

Date	Time	Venue		Score		Set 1	Set 2	Set 3	Set 4	Set 5	Total	Report
5 Nov	16:00	Court 1	China	3–0	Uzbekistan	25–9	25–11	25–8			75–28	Report
5 Nov	18:30	Court 1	Hong Kong	0–3	South Korea	11–25	12–25	11–25			34–75	Report
6 Nov	16:00	Court 1	Uzbekistan	0–3	South Korea	13–25	7–25	18–25			38–75	Report
6 Nov	18:30	Court 1	Hong Kong	0–3	China	15–25	18–25	10–25			43–75	Report

=== Pool F ===
Pos	Team	Pld	W	L	Pts	SW	SL	SR	SPW	SPL	SPR	Qualification
1	Japan	3	3	0	8	9	3	3.000	281	236	1.191	Final four
2	Chinese Taipei	3	2	1	7	8	4	2.000	276	244	1.131	Final four
3	Thailand	3	1	2	2	4	8	0.500	249	268	0.929	5th–8th places
4	Philippines	3	0	3	1	3	9	0.333	224	282	0.794	5th–8th places

Source: VIS Live Center

Date	Time	Venue		Score		Set 1	Set 2	Set 3	Set 4	Set 5	Total	Report
5 Nov	11:00	Court 1	Japan	3–0	Thailand	25–19	25–16	25–19			75–54	Report
5 Nov	13:30	Court 1	Chinese Taipei	3–0	Philippines	25–14	25–21	25–15			75–50	Report
6 Nov	11:00	Court 1	Philippines	2–3	Thailand	25–23	15–25	25–23	23–25	8–15	96–111	Report
6 Nov	13:30	Court 1	Japan	3–2	Chinese Taipei	25–21	25–23	22–25	23–25	15–10	110–104	Report

=== Pool G ===
Pos	Team	Pld	W	L	Pts	SW	SL	SR	SPW	SPL	SPR	Qualification
1	Kazakhstan	2	2	0	6	6	0	MAX	150	58	2.586	9th–12th places
2	Jordan (H)	2	1	1	3	3	3	1.000	114	127	0.898	9th–12th places
3	Qatar	2	0	2	0	0	6	0.000	71	150	0.473	13th place match
4	Lebanon	3	0	3	0	0	9	0.000	0	225	0.000	

Source: VIS Live Center
(H) Host

Date	Time	Venue		Score		Set 1	Set 2	Set 3	Set 4	Set 5	Total	Report
5 Nov	16:00	Court 2	Jordan	3–0	Qatar	25–18	25–15	25–19			75–52	Report
6 Nov	16:00	Court 2	Jordan	0–3	Kazakhstan	12–25	15–25	12–25			39–75	Report

=== Pool H ===
Pos	Team	Pld	W	L	Pts	SW	SL	SR	SPW	SPL	SPR	Qualification
1	Iran	2	2	0	5	6	2	3.000	180	138	1.304	9th–12th places
2	Australia	2	1	1	4	5	3	1.667	180	155	1.161	9th–12th places
3	India	2	0	2	0	0	6	0.000	83	150	0.553	13th place match
4	Saudi Arabia	3	0	3	0	0	9	0.000	0	225	0.000	

Source: VIS Live Center

Date	Time	Venue		Score		Set 1	Set 2	Set 3	Set 4	Set 5	Total	Report
5 Nov	18:30	Court 2	Iran	3–0	India	25–10	25–17	25–6			75–33	Report
6 Nov	18:30	Court 2	Iran	3–2	Australia	25–23	16–25	25–17	22–25	17–15	105–105	Report

== Final round ==
- All times are Arabia Standard Time (UTC+03:00).

=== 13th place match ===
Date	Time	Venue		Score		Set 1	Set 2	Set 3	Set 4	Set 5	Total	Report
8 Nov	10:00	Court 2	Qatar	0–3	India	12–25	7–25	10–25			29–75	Report

=== 9th–12th places ===
9th–12th semifinals
7 November
Kazakhstan	3
Australia	0
7 November
Iran	3
Jordan	0

9th place match
8 November
Kazakhstan	3
Iran	0
11th place match
8 November
Australia	3
Jordan	0

==== 9th–12th semifinals ====
Date	Time	Venue		Score		Set 1	Set 2	Set 3	Set 4	Set 5	Total	Report
7 Nov	16:00	Court 2	Kazakhstan	3–0	Australia	26–24	25–12	25–14			76–50	Report
7 Nov	18:30	Court 2	Iran	3–0	Jordan	25–10	25–18	25–10			75–38	Report

==== 11th place match ====
Date	Time	Venue		Score		Set 1	Set 2	Set 3	Set 4	Set 5	Total	Report
8 Nov	12:30	Court 2	Australia	3–0	Jordan	25–14	25–14	25–15			75–43	Report

==== 9th place match ====
Date	Time	Venue		Score		Set 1	Set 2	Set 3	Set 4	Set 5	Total	Report
8 Nov	15:00	Court 2	Kazakhstan	3–0	Iran	25–18	25–17	25–18			75–53	Report

=== 5th–8th places ===
5th–8th semifinals
7 November
Hong Kong	0
Philippines	3
7 November
Thailand	3
Uzbekistan	0

5th place match
8 November
Philippines	3
Thailand	1
7th place match
8 November
Hong Kong	1
Uzbekistan	3

==== 5th–8th semifinals ====
Date	Time	Venue		Score		Set 1	Set 2	Set 3	Set 4	Set 5	Total	Report
7 Nov	11:00	Court 1	Hong Kong	0–3	Philippines	20–25	19–25	10–25			49–75	Report
7 Nov	13:30	Court 1	Thailand	3–0	Uzbekistan	25–9	25–14	25–14			75–37	Report

==== 7th place match ====
Date	Time	Venue		Score		Set 1	Set 2	Set 3	Set 4	Set 5	Total	Report
8 Nov	10:00	Court 1	Hong Kong	1–3	Uzbekistan	12–25	23–25	25–15	18–25		78–90	Report

==== 5th place match ====
Date	Time	Venue		Score		Set 1	Set 2	Set 3	Set 4	Set 5	Total	Report
8 Nov	12:30	Court 1	Philippines	3–1	Thailand	25–23	25–20	19–25	25–22		94–90	Report

=== Final four ===
Semifinals
7 November
China	1
Chinese Taipei	3
7 November
Japan	2
South Korea	3

Final
8 November
Chinese Taipei	2
South Korea	3
3rd place match
8 November
China	3
Japan	2

==== Semifinals ====
Date	Time	Venue		Score		Set 1	Set 2	Set 3	Set 4	Set 5	Total	Report
7 Nov	16:00	Court 1	China	1–3	Chinese Taipei	21–25	25–20	19–25	23–25		88–95	Report
7 Nov	18:30	Court 1	Japan	2–3	South Korea	25–20	19–25	25–15	22–25	8–15	99–100	Report

==== 3rd place match ====
Date	Time	Venue		Score		Set 1	Set 2	Set 3	Set 4	Set 5	Total	Report
8 Nov	15:00	Court 1	China	3–2	Japan	26–28	25–16	25–21	21–25	15–13	112–103	Report

==== Final ====
Date	Time	Venue		Score		Set 1	Set 2	Set 3	Set 4	Set 5	Total	Report
8 Nov	18:00	Court 1	Chinese Taipei	2–3	South Korea	28–26	21–25	11–25	25–19	13–15	98–110	Report

== Final standing ==
Rank	Team
1st place, gold medalist(s)	South Korea
2nd place, silver medalist(s)	Chinese Taipei
3rd place, bronze medalist(s)	China
4	Japan
5	Philippines
6	Thailand
7	Uzbekistan
8	Hong Kong
9	Kazakhstan
10	Iran
11	Australia
12	Jordan
13	India
14	Qatar
15	Lebanon
16	Saudi Arabia

Qualified for the 2026 Girls' U17 World Championship
Qualified for the 2026 Girls' U17 World Championship as defending champions
Qualified for the 2026 Girls' U17 World Championship via FIVB World Ranking

2025 Asian Women's U16 champions

South Korea
1st title

12–girl roster
Son Seoyeon (C), Lee Dayeon, Bae Seobin, Lee Seoin, Shin Euijung, Jang Suin, Moon Tiara, Jeong Gyeonghui, Geum Byeol, Park Yeyoung, Yeo Won (L), Eo Minseo
Head coach
Lee Seungyeo

== Qualified teams for FIVB U17 World Championship ==
The following teams from AVC qualified for the 2026 FIVB Volleyball Girls' U17 World Championship.

Team	Qualified on	Previous appearances in the U17 World Championship
Japan	5 November 2025	1 (2024)
Chinese Taipei	5 November 2025	1 (2024)
South Korea	6 November 2025	0 (Debut)
Philippines	8 November 2025	0 (Debut)

== See also ==
- 2025 Asian Men's U16 Volleyball Championship
