= Philippines women's national under-17 volleyball team =

Philippines U17
- Association: Philippine National Volleyball Federation
- Confederation: AVC
- Head coach: (Philippines) Edwin Leyva

Uniforms
Home	Away	Third

FIVB U17 World Championship
- Appearances: 1 (First in 2026)
- Best result: 15th place (2026)

AVC Girls' U16 Volleyball Championship
- Appearances: 1 (First in 2025)
- Best result: 5th place (2025)

The Philippines women's national under-17 volleyball team represents the Philippines in international women's volleyball competitions for players under the age 17. It is organized under the Philippine National Volleyball Federation.

== History ==
=== Before 2025 ===
The Philippine National Volleyball Federation (PNVF), the current national sports association for volleyball in the Philippines was established in 2021. By 2025, it had maintained a grassroots development program for its national teams for four years.

The FIVB announced the inaugural FIVB Volleyball Girls' U17 World Championship in 2024. The Philippines did not enter the 2023 Asian Women's U16 Volleyball Championship, the qualifier for the world championship for girls under 17 years of age.

=== 2025–2026 ===
A 12-player squad was assembled made of girls coming from different parts of the Philippines. The squad coached by Edwin Leyva had two weeks of preparation before making their debut at the 2025 Asian Women's U16 Volleyball Championship in Jordan in November. The team finished fifth, earning a berth at the 2026 FIVB Volleyball Girls' U17 World Championship in Chile.

The PNVF announced Babes Castillo as head coach of the team in February 2026, as Leyva's planned replacement. He was expected to start handling the team in May.

The team made their U17 World Championship debut in August 2026, with Leyva listed as head coach for the tournament. Leyva described the team as having had limited preparation ahead of the tournament.They lost their opening match to defending champions China before defeating Mexico for their first win at the tournament. The team attained its best finish of a Philippine national team of any gender in a FIVB-event by reaching the Round of 16 and finished 15th place.

== Results ==
=== FIVB Girls' U17 World Championship ===
Champions Runners up Third place Fourth place

FIVB Girls' U17 World Championship
Year	Round	Position	Pld	W	L	SW	SL	Squad
(Peru) 2024	Didn't participate							
(Chile) 2026	To be determined							Squad
Total	0 Title	1/2	0	0	0	0	0	—N/a

=== Asian Women's U16 Championship ===
Champions Runners up Third place Fourth place

Asian Women's U16 Championship
Year	Round	Position	Pld	W	L	SW	SL	Squad
(China) 2023	Didn't participate							
(Jordan) 2025	Classification Round	5th place	8	4	4	16	13	Squad
Total	0 Title	1/2	8	4	4	16	3	—N/a

== Fixtures and results ==
=== 2020s ===
==== 2025 ====
Opponent	Date	Result	Set						Event	Location
Opponent	Date	Result	1	2	3	4	5	Total	Event	Location
Japan	November 1, 2025	1–3	25-17	21–25	25-16	25-20		96-78	2025 Asian Women's U16 Volleyball Championship	Amman, Jordan
Iran	November 2, 2025	3–0	25-21	25–22	25–22			75–65	2025 Asian Women's U16 Volleyball Championship	Amman, Jordan
Chinese Taipei	November 5, 2025	0–3	14-25	21–25	15–25			50–75	2025 Asian Women's U16 Volleyball Championship	Amman, Jordan
Thailand	November 6, 2025	2–3	25-23	15-25	25-23	23-25	8-15	96–111	2025 Asian Women's U16 Volleyball Championship	Amman, Jordan
Hong Kong	November 7, 2025	3–0	25-20	25–19	25–10			75-49	2025 Asian Women's U16 Volleyball Championship	Amman, Jordan
Thailand	November 8, 2025	3–1	25-23	25–20	19-25	25–22		94-90	2025 Asian Women's U16 Volleyball Championship	Amman, Jordan

==== 2026 ====
Opponent	Date	Result	Set						Event	Location
Opponent	Date	Result	1	2	3	4	5	Total	Event	Location
China	August 6, 2026	0–3	18–25	21–25	13–25			52–75	2026 FIVB Volleyball Girls' U17 World Championship	Santiago, Chile
Mexico	August 7, 2026	3–1	25–19	20–25	25–18	25–23		95–85	2026 FIVB Volleyball Girls' U17 World Championship	Santiago, Chile
Tunisia	August 8, 2026	3–1	27–25	25–19	25–16			77–66	2026 FIVB Volleyball Girls' U17 World Championship	Santiago, Chile
Peru	August 10, 2026	1–3	28–26	22–25	23–25	20–55		93–101	2026 FIVB Volleyball Girls' U17 World Championship	Santiago, Chile
Venezuela	August 11, 2026	2–3	19–25	16–25	25–22	25–19	11–15	96–106	2026 FIVB Volleyball Girls' U17 World Championship	Santiago, Chile
South Korea	August 12, 2026	0–3	21–25	18–25	14–25			53–75	2026 FIVB Volleyball Girls' U17 World Championship	Santiago, Chile
Japan	August 14, 2026								2026 FIVB Volleyball Girls' U17 World Championship	Santiago, Chile

== Team ==
=== Current squad ===
The following is the team's final roster for the 2026 FIVB Volleyball Girls' U17 World Championship.

Philippine women's national under-17 volleyball team for the 2026 FIVB Volleyball Girls' U17 World Championship
No.	Position	Name	Date of birth	Height	2025-26 team
1	OP	Jhaynna Love Bulandres	April 9, 2011 (age 15)	1.75 m (5 ft 9 in)	(Philippines) NU - Nazareth School
2	S	Irish May Mahinay	June 11, 2010 (age 16)	1.71 m (5 ft 7 in)	(Philippines) NU - Nazareth School
3	L	Taj Arkhea Teves	October 11, 2012 (age 14)	1.61 m (5 ft 3 in)	(Philippines) UST High School
6	OH	Nadeth Faye Herbon	February 28, 2010 (age 16)	1.61 m (5 ft 3 in)	(Philippines) Leyte National High School
7	S	Resty Jane Olaguir	June 23, 2011 (age 15)	1.64 m (5 ft 5 in)	(Philippines) Gracel Christian College Foundation
8	MB	Princess Khaira Manzano	May 8, 2010 (age 16)	1.78 m (5 ft 10 in)	(Philippines) NU - Nazareth School
10	MB	Jhenica Sadia	April 10, 2010 (age 16)	1.67 m (5 ft 6 in)	(Philippines) NU - Nazareth School
11	OH	Xyz Ellen Rayco	November 3, 2011 (age 14)	1.77 m (5 ft 10 in)	(Philippines) NU - Nazareth School
12	OP	Jello Andrea Mauricio	November 28, 2011 (age 14)	1.72 m (5 ft 8 in)	(Philippines) San Felipe Neri Catholic School
13	MB	Cristina Madele Gale	January 16, 2010 (age 16)	1.75 m (5 ft 9 in)	(Philippines) Bacolod Tay Tung High School
17	OH	Sharina Rhyza Lleses	October 27, 2011 (age 14)	1.72 m (5 ft 8 in)	(Philippines) King's Montessori School
18	L	Frances Dianne Ramos	April 30, 2011 (age 15)	1.59 m (5 ft 3 in)	(Philippines) NU - Nazareth School
22	OP	Megan Yesha Hernandez	February 6, 2010 (age 16)	1.72 m (5 ft 8 in)	(Philippines) Canossa Academy – Lipa
33	OH	Caera Celis	January 25, 2010 (age 16)	1.67 m (5 ft 6 in)	(Philippines) St. John’s Institute

Coaching Staff
Position	Name
Head Coach	(Philippines) Edwin Leyva
Assistant Coach	(Philippines) Oliver Balse
Assistant Coach	(Philippines) Wynnette Bernardo
Team Manager	(Philippines) Karl Chan
Physical Therapist	(Philippines) Hannah De Luna

== Head coach ==
Name	Tournament
(Philippines) Edwin Leyva	2025 Asian U16 Volleyball Championship; 2026 U17 World Championship

== See also ==
- Women's
  - Philippines women's national volleyball team
  - Philippines women's national under-23 volleyball team
  - Philippines women's national under-21 volleyball team
  - Philippines women's national under-19 volleyball team
  - Philippines women's national beach volleyball team
- Men's
  - Philippines men's national volleyball team
  - Philippines men's national under-23 volleyball team
  - Philippines men's national under-19 volleyball team
  - Philippines men's national beach volleyball team
- Volleyball in the Philippines
