= 2023 Girls' U17 NORCECA Volleyball Championship =

Tournament details
- Host country: Honduras
- City: Tegucigalpa
- Dates: 21–26 November 2023
- Teams: 8
- Venue: 1 (in 1 host city)

Final positions
- Champions: Mexico (1st title)
- Runners-up: Puerto Rico
- Third place: Canada
- Fourth place: Dominican Republic

Tournament awards
- MVP: (Mexico) Dibanhi Barrera
- Best Setter: (Canada) Megan Hunter
- Best OH: (Puerto Rico) Sara Lozano (Mexico) Aitana Rettke
- Best MB: (Dominican Republic) Caroline Rodriguez (Nicaragua) Keyling Olivas
- Best OPP: (Mexico) Yliana Zuñiga
- Best Libero: (Mexico) Dibanhi Barrera

Tournament statistics
- Matches played: 22
- Best scorer: (Cuba) Salet Castillo
- Best server: (Mexico) Gabriela Garza
- Best digger: (Mexico) Dibanhi Barrera
- Best receiver: (Mexico) Dibanhi Barrera

The 2023 Girls' U17 NORCECA Volleyball Championship, officially named 2023 NORCECA Girls' U17 Continental Championship, was the 1st edition of the Girls' U17 NORCECA Volleyball Championship, a biennial international volleyball tournament organised by the North, Central America and Caribbean Volleyball Confederation (NORCECA) for the girls' under-17 national teams of North, Central America and Caribbean. It was held in Tegucigalpa, Honduras from 21 to 26 November 2023.

The tournament acted as the NORCECA qualifiers for the FIVB Volleyball Girls' U17 World Championship. The top three teams qualified for the 2024 FIVB Volleyball Girls' U17 World Championship in Peru as the NORCECA representatives.

Mexico won the title after beating Puerto Rico 3–2 in the final. Canada defeated Dominican Republic 3–1 in the third place match to take the bronce medal. Champions Mexico, runners-up Puerto Rico and the third place Canada qualified for the 2024 FIVB Volleyball Girls' U17 World Championship.

== Participating teams ==
A maximum of 8 national teams could qualify for the tournament as follows: the host nation and the top 7 teams according to the NORCECA U19 Continental Ranking as of 1 January 2023 (as reference, considering that there was no U17 ranking) that confirmed their participation.

The following were the teams invited and eligible to participate in the tournament (teams that confirmed their participation marked in bold and U19 Continental Ranking is shown in brackets):

- ~~United States~~ (1)
- **Dominican Republic** (2)
- **Canada** (3)
- **Puerto Rico** (4)
- **Mexico** (5)
- **Cuba** (6)
- **Costa Rica** (7)
- **Honduras** (8, hosts)
- **Nicaragua** (9)
- ~~U.S. Virgin Islands~~ (10)
- ~~Barbados~~ (11)
- ~~Suriname~~ (12)

=== Squads ===
Each national team had to register a squad of 12 players. Players born on 1 January 2008 and onwards were eligible to compete in the tournament.

== Competition format ==
In the NORCECA Volleyball Championships the competition format depends on the number of participating teams. With 8 teams, two pools of four teams each were formed. The pool standing procedure were as follows:

1. Number of matches won;
2. Match points;
  - Match won 3–0: 5 match points for the winner, 0 match points for the loser
  - Match won 3–1: 4 match points for the winner, 1 match point for the loser
  - Match won 3–2: 3 match points for the winner, 2 match points for the loser
3. Points ratio;
4. Sets ratio;
5. If the tie continues between two teams: result of the last match between the tied teams;
6. If the tie continues between three or more teams: a new classification would be made taking into consideration only the matches between involved teams.

The winners of each pool advanced directly to the semi-finals, while the runners-up and the third placed teams advanced to the quarter-finals.

=== Groups composition ===
Teams were distributed into two groups of four teams. As hosts, Honduras had the right to choose the group in which to be placed and were assigned to the head of its group (Group A). The remaining teams were distributed into the groups according to their position in the NORCECA U19 Continental Ranking as of 1 January 2023 (as reference, considering that there was no U17 ranking) and following the serpentine system, starting with the highest-ranked team as head of the remaining group (Group B)

| Group A | Group B |
|---|---|
| Honduras | Dominican Republic |
| Puerto Rico | Canada |
| Mexico | Cuba |
| Nicaragua | Costa Rica |

== Preliminary round ==
All match times are local times, GTT (UTC−6), as listed by NORCECA.

=== Group A ===
| Pos | Team | Pld | W | L | Pts | SW | SL | SR | SPW | SPL | SPR | Qualification |
|---|---|---|---|---|---|---|---|---|---|---|---|---|
| 1 | Puerto Rico | 3 | **3** | 0 | 15 | 9 | 0 | MAX | 226 | 152 | 1.487 | Semi-finals |
| 2 | Mexico | 3 | **2** | 1 | 10 | 6 | 3 | 2.000 | 214 | 144 | 1.486 | Quarter-finals |
| 3 | Nicaragua | 3 | **1** | 2 | 5 | 3 | 6 | 0.500 | 168 | 188 | 0.894 | Quarter-finals |
| 4 | Honduras | 3 | **0** | 3 | 0 | 0 | 9 | 0.000 | 101 | 225 | 0.449 | 5th–8th semifinals |

Source: NORCECA

| Date | Time | | Score | | Set 1 | Set 2 | Set 3 | Set 4 | Set 5 | Total | Report |
|---|---|---|---|---|---|---|---|---|---|---|---|
| 21 Nov | 18:00 | **Puerto Rico** | 3–0 | Mexico | 26–24 | 25–21 | 25–19 | | | 76–64 | P2 P3 |
| 21 Nov | 20:00 | Honduras | 0–3 | **Nicaragua** | 17–25 | 7–25 | 14–25 | | | 38–75 | P2 P3 |
| 22 Nov | 18:00 | Nicaragua | 0–3 | **Puerto Rico** | 15–25 | 18–25 | 17–25 | | | 50–75 | P2 P3 |
| 22 Nov | 20:00 | **Mexico** | 3–0 | Honduras | 25–9 | 25–10 | 25–6 | | | 75–25 | P2 P3 |
| 23 Nov | 18:00 | Nicaragua | 0–3 | **Mexico** | 13–25 | 17–25 | 13–25 | | | 43–75 | P2 P3 |
| 23 Nov | 20:00 | Honduras | 0–3 | **Puerto Rico** | 12–25 | 11–25 | 15–25 | | | 38–75 | P2 P3 |

=== Group B ===
| Pos | Team | Pld | W | L | Pts | SW | SL | SR | SPW | SPL | SPR | Qualification |
|---|---|---|---|---|---|---|---|---|---|---|---|---|
| 1 | Canada | 3 | **3** | 0 | 11 | 9 | 4 | 2.250 | 297 | 250 | 1.188 | Semi-finals |
| 2 | Dominican Republic | 3 | **2** | 1 | 11 | 7 | 3 | 2.333 | 233 | 213 | 1.094 | Quarter-finals |
| 3 | Cuba | 3 | **1** | 2 | 5 | 5 | 8 | 0.625 | 250 | 292 | 0.856 | Quarter-finals |
| 4 | Costa Rica | 3 | **0** | 3 | 3 | 3 | 9 | 0.333 | 248 | 273 | 0.908 | 5th–8th semifinals |

Source: NORCECA

| Date | Time | | Score | | Set 1 | Set 2 | Set 3 | Set 4 | Set 5 | Total | Report |
|---|---|---|---|---|---|---|---|---|---|---|---|
| 21 Nov | 14:00 | **Dominican Republic** | 3–0 | Costa Rica | 25–22 | 25–22 | 25–18 | | | 75–62 | P2 P3 |
| 21 Nov | 16:00 | **Canada** | 3–2 | Cuba | 26–28 | 25–18 | 16–25 | 25–11 | 15–9 | 107–91 | P2 P3 |
| 22 Nov | 14:00 | Costa Rica | 1–3 | **Canada** | 19–25 | 18–25 | 25–21 | 16–25 | | 78–96 | P2 P3 |
| 22 Nov | 16:00 | Cuba | 0–3 | **Dominican Republic** | 25–27 | 17–25 | 15–25 | | | 57–77 | P2 P3 |
| 23 Nov | 14:00 | Costa Rica | 2–3 | **Cuba** | 25–14 | 25–20 | 22–25 | 20–25 | 16–18 | 108–102 | P2 P3 |
| 23 Nov | 16:00 | Dominican Republic | 1–3 | **Canada** | 16–25 | 19–25 | 25–19 | 21–25 | | 81–94 | P2 P3 |

== Final round ==
=== Bracket ===
5th place match
**Costa Rica** | **3**
Cuba | 2
7th place match
Nicaragua | 0
**Honduras** | **3**

5th–8th semi-finals
4A | Honduras | 0
**3B** | **Cuba** | **3**
**4B** | **Costa Rica** | **3**
3A | Nicaragua | 0

Quarter-finals
**2A** | **Mexico** | **3**
3B | Cuba | 0
**2B** | **Dominican Republic** | **3**
3A | Nicaragua | 0

Semi-finals
1B | Canada | 1
**2A** | **Mexico** | **3**
**1A** | **Puerto Rico** | **3**
2B | Dominican Republic | 1

Final
**Mexico** | **3**
Puerto Rico | 2
3rd place match
**Canada** | **3**
Dominican Republic | 1

=== Quarter-finals ===
| Date | Time | | Score | | Set 1 | Set 2 | Set 3 | Set 4 | Set 5 | Total | Report |
|---|---|---|---|---|---|---|---|---|---|---|---|
| 24 Nov | 16:00 | **Dominican Republic** | **3–0** | Nicaragua | 25–18 | 25–20 | 25–14 | | | **75–52** | P2 P3 |
| 24 Nov | 18:00 | **Mexico** | **3–0** | Cuba | 25–10 | 25–17 | 25–19 | | | **75–46** | P2 P3 |

=== 5th–8th Semi-finals ===
| Date | Time | | Score | | Set 1 | Set 2 | Set 3 | Set 4 | Set 5 | Total | Report |
|---|---|---|---|---|---|---|---|---|---|---|---|
| 25 Nov | 14:00 | **Costa Rica** | **3–0** | Nicaragua | 25–21 | 25–21 | 25–22 | | | **75–64** | P2 P3 |
| 25 Nov | 16:00 | Honduras | **0–3** | **Cuba** | 16–25 | 8–25 | 7–25 | | | **31–75** | P2 P3 |

=== Semi-finals ===
| Date | Time | | Score | | Set 1 | Set 2 | Set 3 | Set 4 | Set 5 | Total | Report |
|---|---|---|---|---|---|---|---|---|---|---|---|
| 25 Nov | 18:00 | Canada | **1–3** | **Mexico** | 20–25 | 23–25 | 25–22 | 16–25 | | **84–97** | P2 P3 |
| 25 Nov | 20:00 | **Puerto Rico** | **3–1** | Dominican Republic | 25–22 | 25–19 | 18–25 | 29–27 | | **97–93** | P2 P3 |

=== 7th place match ===
| Date | Time | | Score | | Set 1 | Set 2 | Set 3 | Set 4 | Set 5 | Total | Report |
|---|---|---|---|---|---|---|---|---|---|---|---|
| 26 Nov | 11:00 | **Nicaragua** | **3–0** | Honduras | 25–11 | 25–18 | 25–20 | | | **75–49** | P2 P3 |

=== 5th place match ===
| Date | Time | | Score | | Set 1 | Set 2 | Set 3 | Set 4 | Set 5 | Total | Report |
|---|---|---|---|---|---|---|---|---|---|---|---|
| 26 Nov | 13:00 | **Costa Rica** | **3–2** | Cuba | 15–25 | 21–25 | 25–19 | 25–20 | 15–11 | **101–100** | P2 P3 |

=== 3rd place match ===
| Date | Time | | Score | | Set 1 | Set 2 | Set 3 | Set 4 | Set 5 | Total | Report |
|---|---|---|---|---|---|---|---|---|---|---|---|
| 26 Nov | 15:00 | **Canada** | **3–1** | Dominican Republic | 28–30 | 28–26 | 25–23 | 28–26 | | **109–105** | P2 P3 |

=== Final ===
| Date | Time | | Score | | Set 1 | Set 2 | Set 3 | Set 4 | Set 5 | Total | Report |
|---|---|---|---|---|---|---|---|---|---|---|---|
| 26 Nov | 17:00 | **Mexico** | **3–2** | Puerto Rico | 23–25 | 23–25 | 27–25 | 25–21 | 15–5 | **113–101** | P2 P3 |

== Final standing ==
| Rank | Team |
|---|---|
| 1st place, gold medalist(s) | Mexico |
| 2nd place, silver medalist(s) | Puerto Rico |
| 3rd place, bronze medalist(s) | Canada |
| 4 | Dominican Republic |
| 5 | Costa Rica |
| 6 | Cuba |
| 7 | Nicaragua |
| 8 | Honduras |

| Qualified for 2024 FIVB Girls' U17 World Championship |
| Qualified for the 2024 Girls' U17 World Championship via FIVB World Ranking |

2023 Girls' U17 NORCECA champions

**Mexico**
**First title**

Team Roster:

Kimberly Rosales, Brenda Esquivel, Kenia Martínez, Ana Paula Moreno, Yliana Zúñiga, Dibanhi Barrera (L), Gabriela Garza, Aitana Rettke (c), Kiara Ramírez, Fátima Salcedo, Cyntia Palomo, Sophya Garcia

Head coach: (Mexico) Ignacio Sánchez Palmeros

== Individual awards ==
The following individual awards were presented at the end of the tournament.

- **Most valuable player**
  Dibanhi Barrera (MEX)
- **Best setter**
  Megan Hunter (CAN)
- **Best outside hitters**
  Sara Lozano (PUR)
  Aitana Rettke (MEX)
- **Best middle blockers**
  Caroline Rodriguez (DOM)
  Keyling Olivas (NCA)
- **Best opposite**
  Yliana Zuñiga (MEX)
- **Best scorer**
  Salet Castillo (CUB)
- **Best server**
  Gabriela Garza (MEX)
- **Best libero**
  Dibanhi Barrera (MEX)
- **Best digger**
  Dibanhi Barrera (MEX)
- **Best receiver**
  Dibanhi Barrera (MEX)
