= Boys' U17 NORCECA Pan American Volleyball Cup =

- Current season, competition or edition: 2026 Boys' U17 NORCECA Pan American Volleyball Cup
- Sport: Volleyball
- Founded: 2024
- Continent: NORCECA
- Most recent champion: Venezuela (1st title)
- Most titles: Puerto Rico; Venezuela (1 title each)

The Boys' U17 NORCECA Pan American Cup is a sport competition for national volleyball teams, currently held biannually and organized by the NORCECA, the North America, Central America and Caribbean volleyball federation. The competition is played by boys' under-17 teams.

== Summary ==
Pan American Cup
Year	Host	Gold	Silver	Bronze
2024; Details	(Mexico); Colima	Puerto Rico	Mexico	Cuba
2026; Details	Guatemala City	Venezuela	Canada	United States

== Medal table ==
Rank	Nation	Gold	Silver	Bronze	Total
1	Puerto Rico	1	0	0	1
1	Venezuela	1	0	0	1
3	Canada	0	1	0	1
3	Mexico	0	1	0	1
5	Cuba	0	0	1	1
5	United States	0	0	1	1
Totals (6 entries)		2	2	2	6

== Participating nations ==
Nation	(Mexico) 2024	(Guatemala) 2026	Years
Canada	4th	2nd	2
Costa Rica	6th	6th	2
Cuba	3rd	–	1
Guatemala	5th	7th	2
Honduras	–	8th	1
Mexico	2nd	4th	2
Nicaragua	7th	–	2
Puerto Rico	1st	5th	2
United States	–	3rd	1
Venezuela	–	1st	1
Total	7	8	

== See also ==
- Girls' U17 NORCECA Pan American Volleyball Cup
