= Girls' U17 NORCECA Continental Championship =

- Current season, competition or edition: 2025 Girls' U17 NORCECA Continental Championship
- Sport: Volleyball
- Founded: 2023
- Continent: NORCECA
- Most recent champion: United States (1st title)
- Most titles: United States; Mexico (1 title each)

The Girls' U17 NORCECA Continental Championship is a sport competition for national volleyball teams, currently held biannually and organized by the NORCECA, the North America, Central America and Caribbean volleyball federation. The competition is played by girls' under-17 teams.

== Summary ==
NORCECA Championship
Year	Host	Gold	Silver	Bronze
2023; Details	(Honduras); Tegucigalpa	Mexico	Puerto Rico	Canada
2025; Details	(Costa Rica); San José	United States	Mexico	Puerto Rico

== Medal table ==
Rank	Nation	Gold	Silver	Bronze	Total
1	Mexico	1	1	0	2
2	United States	1	0	0	1
3	Puerto Rico	0	1	1	2
4	Canada	0	0	1	1
Totals (4 entries)		2	2	2	6
