= AVC Girls' U16 Volleyball Championship =

International volleyball competition

- Most recent season or competition: 2025 Asian Women's U16 Volleyball Championship
- Sport: Volleyball
- Founded: 2023; 3 years ago
- First season: 2023
- No. of teams: 16
- Continent: Asia and Oceania (AVC)
- Most recent champions: South Korea (1st title)
- Most titles: Japan; South Korea (1 title)

The AVC Girls' U16 Volleyball Championship, is an international volleyball competition in Asia and Oceania contested by the under 16 women's national teams of the members of Asian Volleyball Confederation (AVC), the sport's continent governing body. Tournaments have been awarded every two years since 2023. The top four teams qualified for the FIVB Volleyball Girls' U17 World Championship.

== Result summary ==
Year	Host	Final			3rd place match			Teams
Year	Host	Champions	Score	Runners-up	3rd place	Score	4th place	Teams
2023; Details	(China); Hangzhou	Japan	3–1	China	Chinese Taipei	3–0	Thailand	11
2025; Details	(Jordan); Amman	South Korea	3–2	Chinese Taipei	China	3–2	Japan	14
2027; Details	(Thailand); Nakhon Ratchasima							

=== Teams reaching the top four ===
Team	Winners	Runners-up	Third-place	Fourth-place
Japan	1 (2023)			1 (2025)
South Korea	1 (2025)			
Chinese Taipei		1 (2025)	1 (2023)	
China		1 (2023)	1 (2025)	
Thailand				1 (2023)

=== Champions by region ===
Federation (Region)	Champion(s)	Number
EAZVA (East Asia)	Japan (1); South Korea (1)	2 title(s)

== Hosts ==
Times Hosted	Nations	Year(s)
1	China	2023
1	Jordan	2025
1	Thailand	2027

== Medal table ==
Rank	Nation	Gold	Silver	Bronze	Total
1	Japan	1	0	0	1
1	South Korea	1	0	0	1
3	China	0	1	1	2
3	Chinese Taipei	0	1	1	2
Totals (4 entries)		2	2	2	6

== Participating nations ==
Legend

- 1st – Champions
- 2nd – Runners-up
- 3rd – Third place
- 4th – Fourth place
- • – Did not enter / Did not qualify
- º – Withdrew but remained listed in the competition.
- – Hosts
- Q – Qualified for the forthcoming tournament

Year Team	(China) 2023 (11)	(Jordan) 2025 (16)	Total
Australia	11th	11th	2
China	2nd	3rd	2
Chinese Taipei	3rd	2nd	2
Hong Kong	9th	8th	2
India	•	13th	1
Iran	6th	10th	2
Japan	1st	4th	2
Jordan	•	12th	1
Kazakhstan	5th	9th	2
Lebanon	•	16th (Note: Withdrew from tournament)	1
Macau	8th	•	1
Mongolia	10th	•	1
Philippines	•	5th	1
Qatar	•	14th	1
Saudi Arabia	•	16th	1
South Korea	•	1st	1
Thailand	4th	6th	2
Uzbekistan	7th	7th	2

=== Debut of teams ===
Year	Debutants	Total
2023	Australia	11
2023	China	11
2023	Chinese Taipei	11
2023	Hong Kong	11
2023	Iran	11
2023	Japan	11
2023	Kazakhstan	11
2023	Macau	11
2023	Mongolia	11
2023	Thailand	11
2023	Uzbekistan	11
2025	India	5
2025	Jordan	5
2025	Philippines	5
2025	Qatar	5
2025	South Korea	5

== Awards ==
=== Most valuable player ===
Tournament	Most Valuable Player
2023 Hangzhou	(Japan) Yuzuki Baba
2025 Amman	(South Korea) Son Seoyeon

=== Best outside spikers ===
Tournament	Best Outside Spikers
2023 Hangzhou	(Japan) Yuzuki Baba
2023 Hangzhou	(Chinese Taipei) Chen Pin-Yu
2025 Amman	(South Korea) Son Seoyeon
2025 Amman	(Chinese Taipei) Chen Ting-Yi

=== Best opposite spiker ===
Tournament	Best Opposite Spiker
2023 Hangzhou	(China) Yang Shuming
2025 Amman	(Chinese Taipei) Chang Yun-Chen

=== Best setter ===
Tournament	Best Setter
2023 Hangzhou	(Japan) Hagumi Yoshimura
2025 Amman	(South Korea) Lee Seoin

=== Best middle Blockers ===
Tournament	Best Middle Blockers
2023 Hangzhou	(China) Chen Xiaohui
2023 Hangzhou	(Japan) Kaho Kono
2025 Amman	(South Korea) Lee Dayeon
2025 Amman	(China) Chen Xinyi

=== Best libero ===
Tournament	Best Libero
2023 Hangzhou	(China) Li Mingjing
2025 Amman	(Chinese Taipei) Wu Xin-Yun

== See also ==
- AVC Boys' U16 Volleyball Championship
- AVC Women's Volleyball Continental Championship
- AVC Women's Volleyball Cup
- AVC Women's U20 Volleyball Championship
- AVC Girls' U18 Volleyball Championship
