= 2023 Asian Women's U16 Volleyball Championship =

Volleyball competition in Hangzhou, China

2023 Asian Women's U16 Championship
2023年亚洲青少年U16女子排球锦标赛

Tournament details
- Host country: China
- City: Hangzhou
- Dates: 1–8 July
- Teams: 11
- Venue: 4 (in 1 host city)

Final positions
- Champions: Japan (1st title)
- Runners-up: China
- Third place: Chinese Taipei
- Fourth place: Thailand

Tournament statistics
- Matches played: 29
- Attendance: 34,010 (1,173 per match)

The 2023 Asian Women's U16 Volleyball Championship was the inaugural edition of the Asian Women's U16 Volleyball Championship, a biennial international volleyball tournament organised by Asian Volleyball Confederation (AVC) with Chinese Volleyball Association (CVA). The tournament was held in Hangzhou, China from 1 to 8 July 2023.

This tournament served as a qualification tournament for the FIVB Volleyball Girls' U17 World Championship. The top three teams of the tournament qualified for the 2024 FIVB Volleyball Girls' U17 World Championship as the AVC representatives.

Players must be born on or after January 1, 2007.

== Pools composition ==
The overview of pools was released on 16 March 2023.

Pool A	Pool B	Pool C	Pool D
China (Host)	Japan	Hong Kong	Chinese Taipei
Mongolia	Australia	Thailand	Macau
Uzbekistan	Iran	Kazakhstan	~~India~~*

* India withdrew from the tournament.

== Venue ==
All matches
Hangzhou, China
Linping Sports Centre Gymnasium (Court 1)	Shaoxing China Textile City Sports Center (Court 2)	Deqing Sports Centre Gymnasium (Court 3)	Hangzhou Normal University Cangqian Gymnasium (Court 4)
Capacity: 4,300	Capacity: unknown	Capacity: unknown	Capacity: 8,033

== Pool standing procedure ==
1. Number of Victories
2. Match points
3. Set quotient
4. Points quotient
5. If the tie continues as per the point quotient between two teams, the priority will be given to the team which won the last match between them. When the tie in points quotient is between three or more teams, a new classification of these teams in the terms of points 1, 2 and 3 will be made taking into consideration only the matches in which they were opposed to each other.

Match won 3–0 or 3–1: 3 match points for the winner, 0 match points for the loser
Match won 3–2: 2 match points for the winner, 1 match point for the loser

== Preliminary round ==
- All times are China Standard Time (UTC+08:00).

=== Pool A ===
Pos	Team	Pld	W	L	Pts	SW	SL	SR	SPW	SPL	SPR	Qualification
1	China	2	2	0	6	6	0	MAX	150	61	2.459	Pool E
2	Uzbekistan	2	1	1	3	3	3	1.000	100	126	0.794	Pool E
3	Mongolia	2	0	2	0	0	6	0.000	87	150	0.580	9th–11th places

Source: Daily Bulletin 4

Date	Time	Venue		Score		Set 1	Set 2	Set 3	Set 4	Set 5	Total	Report
1 Jul	19:30	Court 1	China	3–0	Mongolia	25–11	25–9	25–16			75–36	Report
2 Jul	15:00	Court 1	Uzbekistan	0–3	China	7–25	10–25	8–25			25–75	Report
3 Jul	10:30	Court 2	Mongolia	0–3	Uzbekistan	11–25	18–25	22–25			51–75	Report

=== Pool B ===
Pos	Team	Pld	W	L	Pts	SW	SL	SR	SPW	SPL	SPR	Qualification
1	Japan	2	2	0	6	6	0	MAX	150	91	1.648	Pool F
2	Iran	2	1	1	3	3	3	1.000	130	126	1.032	Pool F
3	Australia	2	0	2	0	0	6	0.000	87	150	0.580	9th–11th places

Source: Daily Bulletin 4

Date	Time	Venue		Score		Set 1	Set 2	Set 3	Set 4	Set 5	Total	Report
1 Jul	10:30	Court 1	Japan	3–0	Australia	25–6	25–12	25–18			75–36	Report
2 Jul	10:30	Court 1	Iran	0–3	Japan	16–25	19–25	20–25			55–75	Report
3 Jul	15:30	Court 2	Australia	0–3	Iran	15–25	20–25	16–25			51–75	Report

=== Pool C ===
Pos	Team	Pld	W	L	Pts	SW	SL	SR	SPW	SPL	SPR	Qualification
1	Thailand	2	2	0	5	6	2	3.000	186	129	1.442	Pool E
2	Kazakhstan	2	1	1	3	5	5	1.000	202	207	0.976	Pool E
3	Hong Kong	2	0	2	1	2	6	0.333	142	194	0.732	9th–11th places

Source: Daily Bulletin 4

Date	Time	Venue		Score		Set 1	Set 2	Set 3	Set 4	Set 5	Total	Report
1 Jul	10:30	Court 2	Thailand	3–0	Hong Kong	25–14	25–16	25–16			75–46	Report
2 Jul	10:30	Court 2	Kazakhstan	2–3	Thailand	25–23	11–25	14–25	25–23	8–15	83–111	Report
3 Jul	10:30	Court 1	Hong Kong	2–3	Kazakhstan	31–29	25–23	11–25	14–25	15–17	96–119	Report

=== Pool D ===
Pos	Team	Pld	W	L	Pts	SW	SL	SR	SPW	SPL	SPR	Qualification
1	Chinese Taipei	1	1	0	3	3	0	MAX	75	20	3.750	Pool F
2	Macau	1	0	1	0	0	3	0.000	20	75	0.267	Pool F

Source: Daily Bulletin 4

Date	Time	Venue		Score		Set 1	Set 2	Set 3	Set 4	Set 5	Total	Report
3 Jul	10:30	Court 1	Chinese Taipei	3–0	Macau	25–9	25–7	25–4			75–20	Report

== Classification round ==
- All times are China Standard Time (UTC+08:00).
- The results and the points of the matches between the same teams that were already played during the preliminary round shall be taken into account for the classification round.

=== Pool E ===
Pos	Team	Pld	W	L	Pts	SW	SL	SR	SPW	SPL	SPR	Qualification
1	China (H)	3	3	0	9	9	0	MAX	225	95	2.368	Semifinals
2	Thailand	3	2	1	5	6	5	1.200	223	176	1.267	Semifinals
3	Kazakhstan	3	1	2	4	5	6	0.833	191	239	0.799	5th–8th semifinals
4	Uzbekistan	3	0	3	0	0	9	0.000	96	225	0.427	5th–8th semifinals

Source: Daily Bulletin 6
(H) Host

Date	Time	Venue		Score		Set 1	Set 2	Set 3	Set 4	Set 5	Total	Report
4 Jul	15:00	Court 1	Thailand	3–0	Uzbekistan	25–4	25–7	25–7			75–18	Report
4 Jul	19:00	Court 1	China	3–0	Kazakhstan	25–13	25–14	25–6			75–33	Report
6 Jul	15:00	Court 4	Uzbekistan	0–3	Kazakhstan	17–25	22–25	14–25			53–75	Report
6 Jul	19:00	Court 4	China	3–0	Thailand	25–15	25–12	25–10			75–37	Report

=== Pool F ===
Pos	Team	Pld	W	L	Pts	SW	SL	SR	SPW	SPL	SPR	Qualification
1	Japan	3	3	0	8	9	2	4.500	260	282	0.922	Semifinals
2	Chinese Taipei	3	2	1	7	8	3	2.667	252	170	1.482	Semifinals
3	Iran	3	1	2	3	3	6	0.500	170	174	0.977	5th–8th semifinals
4	Macau	3	0	3	0	0	9	0.000	69	225	0.307	5th–8th semifinals

Source: Daily Bulletin 6

Date	Time	Venue		Score		Set 1	Set 2	Set 3	Set 4	Set 5	Total	Report
4 Jul	15:00	Court 2	Japan	3–0	Macau	25–9	25–7	25–4			75–20	Report
4 Jul	19:00	Court 2	Chinese Taipei	3–0	Iran	25–15	25–10	25–15			75–40	Report
6 Jul	15:00	Court 3	Iran	3–0	Macau	25–5	25–9	25–10			75–24	Report
6 Jul	19:00	Court 3	Japan	3–2	Chinese Taipei	25–22	21–25	24–26	25–19	15–10	110–102	Report

== Final round ==
- All times are China Standard Time (UTC+08:00).

=== 9th–11th places ===
Pos	Team	Pld	W	L	Pts	SW	SL	SR	SPW	SPL	SPR
9	Hong Kong	2	2	0	6	6	1	6.000	167	126	1.325
10	Mongolia	2	1	1	3	4	4	1.000	180	174	1.034
11	Australia	2	0	2	0	1	6	0.167	126	173	0.728

Source: Daily Bulletin 7

Date	Time	Venue		Score		Set 1	Set 2	Set 3	Set 4	Set 5	Total	Report
4 Jul	Court 1	10:30	Mongolia	1–3	Hong Kong	21–25	20–25	25–17	15–25		81–92	Report
6 Jul	Court 4	10:30	Mongolia	3–1	Australia	25–14	25–22	24–26	25–19		99–81	Report
7 Jul	Court 4	10:30	Australia	0–3	Hong Kong	12–25	13–25	20–25			45–75	Report

=== 5th–8th places ===
5th–8th semifinals
7 July
Kazakhstan	3
Macau	0
7 July
Uzbekistan	0
Iran	3

5th place match
8 July
Kazakhstan	3
Iran	1
7th place match
8 July
Macau	0
Uzbekistan	3

==== 5th–8th semifinals ====
Date	Time	Venue		Score		Set 1	Set 2	Set 3	Set 4	Set 5	Total	Report
7 Jul	15:00	Court 3	Kazakhstan	3–0	Macau	25–4	25–9	25–12			75–25	Report
7 Jul	19:00	Court 3	Uzbekistan	0–3	Iran	9–25	19–25	20–25			48–75	Report

==== 7th place match ====
Date	Time	Venue		Score		Set 1	Set 2	Set 3	Set 4	Set 5	Total	Report
8 Jul	15:00	Court 3	Macau	0–3	Uzbekistan	22–25	14–25	7–25			43–75	Report

==== 5th place match ====
Date	Time	Venue		Score		Set 1	Set 2	Set 3	Set 4	Set 5	Total	Report
8 Jul	19:00	Court 3	Kazakhstan	3–1	Iran	18–25	25–21	25–19	25–18		93–83	Report

=== Final four ===
Semifinals
7 July
Thailand	0
Japan	3
7 July
China	3
Chinese Taipei	0

Final
8 July
Japan	3
China	1
3rd place match
8 July
Thailand	0
Chinese Taipei	3

==== Semifinals ====
Date	Time	Venue		Score		Set 1	Set 2	Set 3	Set 4	Set 5	Total	Report
7 Jul	15:00	Court 4	Thailand	0–3	Japan	22–25	13–25	18–25			53–75	Report
7 Jul	19:00	Court 4	China	3–0	Chinese Taipei	25–18	25–17	25–18			75–53	Report

==== 3rd place match ====
Date	Time	Venue		Score		Set 1	Set 2	Set 3	Set 4	Set 5	Total	Report
8 Jul	15:00	Court 4	Thailand	0–3	Chinese Taipei	18–25	19–25	9–25			46–75	Report

==== Final ====
Date	Time	Venue		Score		Set 1	Set 2	Set 3	Set 4	Set 5	Total	Report
8 Jul	19:00	Court 4	Japan	3–1	China	25–19	25–22	17–25	25–19		92–85	Report

== Final standing ==
Rank	Team
1st place, gold medalist(s)	Japan
2nd place, silver medalist(s)	China
3rd place, bronze medalist(s)	Chinese Taipei
4	Thailand
5	Kazakhstan
6	Iran
7	Uzbekistan
8	Macau
9	Hong Kong
10	Mongolia
11	Australia

Qualified for the 2024 Girls' U17 World Championship
Qualified for the 2024 Girls' U17 World Championship via FIVB World Ranking

2023 Asian Women's U16 champions

Japan
First title

12–woman roster
Kaho Kono, Yuzuki Baba, Rion Chuganji, Hikari Kudo, Aileen Kotone McAllister, Yuna Matsuo, Aina Mizokami, Aoi Honda, Miki Yoshii, Hagumi Yoshimura, Kokoro Semba, Mahiro Sato
Head coach
Daichi Saegusa

== Awards ==
- Most valuable player
  Yuzuki Baba (JPN)
- Best setter
  Hagumi Yoshimura (JPN)
- Best outside hitters
  Yuzuki Baba (JPN)
  Chen Pin-Yu (TPE)
- Best middle blockers
  Chen Xiaohui (CHN)
  Kaho Kono (JPN)
- Best opposite spiker
  Yang Shuming (CHN)
- Best libero
  Li Mingjing (CHN)

== See also ==
- 2023 Asian Men's U16 Volleyball Championship
- 2023 Asian Women's Volleyball Championship
