= Girls' U17 NORCECA Pan American Volleyball Cup =

- Current season, competition or edition: 2026 Girls' U17 NORCECA Pan American Cup
- Sport: Volleyball
- Founded: 2024
- Continent: NORCECA
- Most recent champion: United States (1st title)
- Most titles: United States; Puerto Rico (1 title each)

The Girls' U17 NORCECA Pan American Cup is a sport competition for national volleyball teams, currently held biannually and organized by the NORCECA, the North America, Central America and Caribbean volleyball federation. The competition is played by girls' under-17 teams.

== Summary ==
Pan American Cup
Year	Host	Gold	Silver	Bronze
2024; Details	Guatemala City	Puerto Rico	Peru	Venezuela
2026; Details	(Honduras); Tegucigalpa	United States	Venezuela	Peru

== Medal table ==
Rank	Nation	Gold	Silver	Bronze	Total
1	Puerto Rico	1	0	0	1
1	United States	1	0	0	1
3	Peru	0	1	1	2
3	Venezuela	0	1	1	2
Totals (4 entries)		2	2	2	6

== Participating nations ==
Nation	(Guatemala) 2024	(Honduras) 2026	Years
Canada	–	4th	1
Costa Rica	7th	7th	2
Cuba	6th	–	1
Dominican Republic	4th	8th	2
Guatemala	8th	–	1
Honduras	–	9th	1
Mexico	5th	5th	2
Peru	2nd	3rd	2
Puerto Rico	1st	6th	2
United States	–	1st	1
Venezuela	3rd	2nd	2
Total	8	9	
