= United States women's national under-17 volleyball team =

United States U17
- Association: USA Volleyball
- Confederation: NORCECA

Uniforms
Home	Away

FIVB U17 World Championship
- Appearances: 1 (First in 2026)
- Best result: Gold : (2026)

Girls' U17 NORCECA Continental Championship
- Appearances: 1 (First in 2025)
- Best result: (gold) Gold : (2025)
- www.usavolleyball.org
Honours
FIVB Girls' U17 World Championship
Gold medal – first place	2026 Chile	Team
Girls' U17 NORCECA Continental Championship
Gold medal – first place	2025 San José	Team
Girls' U17 NORCECA Pan American Cup
Gold medal – first place	2026 Honduras	Team

The United States women's national under-17 volleyball team represents the United States in international women's volleyball competitions and friendly matches for players under the age 17. It is organized under USA Volleyball body, an affiliate of the International Volleyball Federation (FIVB) and also a part of the North, Central America and Caribbean Volleyball Confederation (NORCECA). The team participated in its first international competition in 2025.

== Results ==
=== FIVB Girls' U17 World Championship ===
Champions Runners up Third place Fourth place

FIVB Girls' U17 World Championship
Year	Round	Position	Pld	W	L	SW	SL	Squad
(Peru) 2024	Didn't participate							
(Chile) 2026	Final	Gold	9	9	0	27	0	Squad
Total	1 Title	1/2	9	9	0	27	0	—N/a

=== Girls' U17 NORCECA Continental Championship ===
Champions Runners up Third place Fourth place

Girls' U17 NORCECA Continental Championship
Year	Round	Position	Pld	W	L	SW	SL	Squad
(Honduras) 2023	Didn't participate							
(Costa Rica) 2025	Final	Gold	5	5	0	15	0	Squad
Total	1 Title	1/2	5	5	0	15	0	—N/a

=== Girls' U17 NORCECA Pan American Cup ===
Champions Runners up Third place Fourth place

Girls' U17 NORCECA Pan American Cup
Year	Round	Position	Pld	W	L	SW	SL	Squad
(Guatemala) 2024	Didn't participate							
(Honduras) 2026	Final	Champions	4	4	0	12	1	Squad
Total	1 Title	1/2	4	4	0	12	1	—N/a

== Rosters ==
The current team squads are in 2026 FIVB Volleyball Girls' U17 World Championship.

Head Coach: Heather Olmstead

Squads:

- Lexi Coleman
- Kaelyn Easton
- Ellie Enger
- Madlen Gloessner
- Kari Knotts
- Grace Hengler
- Taylor Johnson
- Julia Masselink
- Madison Middleton
- Maya Ogbogu
- Brynli Burgess
- Maija Mortensen
- Eminem
- Peyton Smith
- Kaya Young
