= 2025 Girls' U17 NORCECA Continental Championship =

Tournament details
- Host country: Costa Rica
- City: San José
- Dates: 2–10 November 2025
- Teams: 8
- Venue: 1 (in 1 host city)

Final positions
- Champions: United States (1st title)
- Runners-up: Mexico
- Third place: Puerto Rico
- Fourth place: Dominican Republic

Tournament awards
- MVP: (United States) Maya Ogbogu

The 2025 Girls' U17 NORCECA Continental Championship, was the 2nd edition of the Girls' U17 NORCECA Volleyball Championship, a biennial international volleyball tournament organised by the North, Central America and Caribbean Volleyball Confederation (NORCECA) for the girls' under-17 national teams of North, Central America and Caribbean. It was held in San José, Costa Rica from 2 to 10 November 2025.

The United States won the first title. Maya Ogbogu of the United States won the Most Valuable Player award.

== Preliminary round ==
=== Group A ===
Pos	Team	Pld	W	L	Pts	SW	SL	SR	SPW	SPL	SPR	Qualification
1	Dominican Republic	3	3	0	14	9	1	9.000	248	169	1.467	Semifinals
2	Canada	3	2	1	10	6	3	2.000	216	175	1.234	Quarterfinals
3	Costa Rica	3	1	2	6	4	6	0.667	202	216	0.935	Quarterfinals
4	Suriname	3	0	3	0	0	9	0.000	119	225	0.529	

Date	Time		Score		Set 1	Set 2	Set 3	Set 4	Set 5	Total	Report
4 Nov	18:00	Dominican Republic	3–0	Canada	25–23	25–22	25–21			75–66	P2 P3
4 Nov	20:00	Costa Rica	3–0	Suriname	25–14	25–13	25–16			75–43	P2 P3
5 Nov	18:00	Dominican Republic	3–0	Suriname	25–13	25–8	25–13			75–34	P2 P3
5 Nov	20:00	Costa Rica	0–3	Canada	18–25	22–25	18–25			58–75	P2 P3
6 Nov	18:00	Canada	3–0	Suriname	25–10	25–13	25–19			75–42	P2 P3
6 Nov	20:00	Costa Rica	1–3	Dominican Republic	20–25	13–25	25–23	11–25		69–98	P2 P3

=== Group B ===
Pos	Team	Pld	W	L	Pts	SW	SL	SR	SPW	SPL	SPR	Qualification
1	United States	3	3	0	15	9	0	MAX	225	136	1.654	Semifinals
2	Mexico	3	2	1	10	6	3	2.000	203	180	1.128	Quarterfinals
3	Puerto Rico	3	1	2	4	3	7	0.429	190	223	0.852	Quarterfinals
4	Cuba	3	0	3	1	1	9	0.111	168	247	0.680	

Date	Time		Score		Set 1	Set 2	Set 3	Set 4	Set 5	Total	Report
4 Nov	14:00	Puerto Rico	0–3	United States	13–25	17–25	11–25			41–75	P2 P3
4 Nov	16:00	Cuba	0–3	Mexico	16–25	17–25	20–25			53–75	P2 P3
5 Nov	14:00	Mexico	0–3	United States	16–25	22–25	15–25			53–75	P2 P3
5 Nov	16:00	Puerto Rico	3–1	Cuba	25–13	25–19	22–25	25–16		97–73	P2 P3
6 Nov	14:00	Cuba	0–3	United States	11–25	14–25	17–25			42–75	P2 P3
6 Nov	16:00	Puerto Rico	0–3	Mexico	16–25	19–25	17–25			52–75	P2 P3

== Final round ==
=== Bracket ===
Quarterfinals
A2	Canada	2
B3	Puerto Rico	3
A3	Costa Rica	0
B2	Mexico	3

Semifinals
B1	United States	3
B3	Puerto Rico	0
A1	Dominican Republic	2
B2	Mexico	3

Final
B1	United States	3
B2	Mexico	0
Third place
B3	Puerto Rico	3
A1	Dominican Republic	1

=== Quarter-finals ===
Date	Time		Score		Set 1	Set 2	Set 3	Set 4	Set 5	Total	Report
7 Nov	18:00	Mexico	3–0	Costa Rica	25–15	25–10	25–22			75–47	P2 P3
7 June	16:00	Canada	2–3	Puerto Rico	20–25	25–21	25–15	26–28	10–15	106–104	P2 P3

=== Classification 5th–8th ===
Date	Time		Score		Set 1	Set 2	Set 3	Set 4	Set 5	Total	Report
8 Nov	14:00	Cuba	2–3	Costa Rica	21–25	19–25	25–21	25–19	15–17	105–107	P2 P3
8 Nov	16:00	Suriname	0–3	Canada	9–25	11–25	12–25			32–75	P2 P3

=== Semi-finals ===
Date	Time		Score		Set 1	Set 2	Set 3	Set 4	Set 5	Total	Report
8 Nov	18:00	United States	3–0	Puerto Rico	25–10	25–10	25–11			75–31	P2 P3
8 Nov	20:00	Dominican Republic	2–3	Mexico	25–21	25–15	19–25	20–25	13–15	102–101	P2 P3

=== 7th place match ===
Date	Time		Score		Set 1	Set 2	Set 3	Set 4	Set 5	Total	Report
9 Nov	10:00	Cuba	3–1	Suriname	25–21	25–22	18–25	25–10		93–78	P2 P3

=== 5th place match ===
Date	Time		Score		Set 1	Set 2	Set 3	Set 4	Set 5	Total	Report
9 Nov	12:00	Costa Rica	0–3	Canada	22–25	20–25	15–25			57–75	P2 P3

=== 3rd place match ===
Date	Time		Score		Set 1	Set 2	Set 3	Set 4	Set 5	Total	Report
9 Nov	14:00	Puerto Rico	3–1	Dominican Republic	25–22	29–27	11–25	25–19		90–93	P2 P3

=== Final ===
Date	Time		Score		Set 1	Set 2	Set 3	Set 4	Set 5	Total	Report
9 Nov	16:00	United States	3–0	Mexico	25–20	25–12	25–23			75–55	P2 P3

== Final standing ==
Rank	Team
1st place, gold medalist(s)	United States
2nd place, silver medalist(s)	Mexico
3rd place, bronze medalist(s)	Puerto Rico
4	Dominican Republic
5	Canada
6	Costa Rica
7	Cuba
8	Suriname

== Individual awards ==
- Most valuable player
  - Maya Ogbogu (USA)
- Best scorer
  - Rayni Mondesi (DOM)
- Best setter
  - Sofia Rodriguez (MEX)
- Best opposite
  - Rayni Mondesi (DOM)
- Best spikers
  - Maya Ogbogu (USA)
  - Lexi Coleman (USA)
- Best blockers
  - Isabella Gallardo (MEX)
  - Rosaris Peña (DOM)
- Best libero
  - Paula Vargas (MEX)
- Best server
  - Sofia Rodriguez (MEX)
- Best receiver
  - Paula Vargas (MEX)
- Best digger
  - Paula Vargas (MEX)
