= Time in Jordan =

Time in the Middle East: UTC+02:00 UTC+03:00 / Eastern European Time / Israel Standard Time / Eastern European Summer Time / Israel Summer Time; UTC+03:00 / Arabia Standard Time / Turkey Time; UTC+03:30 / Iran Standard Time; UTC+04:00 / Gulf Standard Time; ▉▉▉ Standard time observed all year ▉ Daylight saving time observed

Time in Jordan is on Arabia Standard Time (AST) (UTC+03:00).

Before daylight saving time (DST) was abolished in October 2022, Jordan used EET (UTC+02:00) with an offset of one hour (UTC+03:00) during the summer months. Daylight saving time typically started on Friday during 26 February to 1 April and ended on the last Friday of October, with variations before 2006. In the winter of 2012–2013, there was permanent summer time (UTC+03:00), but had been restored in December 2013, and before 1985, there was permanent standard time (UTC+02:00). In October 2022, daylight saving time was permanently abolished.
