= China women's national under-17 volleyball team =

Youth volleyball team representing China

China
- Association: Chinese Volleyball Association
- Confederation: AVC
- Head coach: Zhi Yuan

Uniforms
Home	Away	Third

FIVB U17 World Championship
- Appearances: 2 (First in 2024)
- Best result: (2024)

AVC U16 Championship
- Appearances: 2 (First in 2023)
- Best result: (2023)

The China women's national under-18 volleyball team represents China in women's under-18 volleyball events, it is controlled and managed by the Chinese Volleyball Association that is a member of Asian volleyball body Asian Volleyball Confederation (AVC) and the international volleyball body government the Fédération Internationale de Volleyball (FIVB).

== History ==
=== 2023–2024 ===
The FIVB announced the inaugural FIVB Volleyball Girls' U17 World Championship in 2024. The inaugural continental qualifier, the 2023 Asian Women's U16 Volleyball Championship was hosted by China in Hangzhou. The host nation's team was coached by Kuang Qi and had trained together for approximately one and a half months since April 2023, including a training camp in Zhangzhou before the tournament. China finished as silver medalists, earning qualification for the 2024 U17 World Championship in Peru.

In preparation for the U17 World Championship, the Chinese team under head coach Zhao Yong started training in late June 2024. He retained five eligible players from the U18 team that took part in the AVC Girls' U18 Volleyball Championship and selected eleven more from various local teams. They held training camps in Shanghai and Brazil and played matches against other national sides. Zhao led China to the inaugural U17 World Championship title in Peru with a 7–0 win–loss record.

=== 2025–2026 ===
In April 2025, a new U16 squad under coach He Qi organized a training camp at the Training Bureau of the State Sports General Administration in preparation of the 2025 Asian Women's U16 Volleyball Championship in Jordan. The team subsequently won a bronze medal, defeating Japan in the third place game.

China entered the 2026 FIVB Volleyball Girls' U17 World Championship in Chile as the defending champions with Yuan Zhi as the listed head coach. Earlier in 2026, Wu Sheng oversaw a U17 training squad preparing for the World Championship, beginning a closed training camp on March 23. They finished as bronze medalists defeating Chinese Taipei in the final playoff.

== Competition record ==
=== FIVB U17 World Championship ===
Champions Runners up Third place Fourth place

FIVB U17 World Championship record
Year	Round	Position	Pld	W	L	SW	SL	Squad
(Peru) 2024	Final	Champions	7	7	0	21	1	Squad
(Chile) 2026	Semifinals	Third Place	9	8	1	24	7	Squad
Total	1 Title	2/2	16	15	1	45	8	—N/a

=== AVC U16 Championship ===
Champions Runners up Third place Fourth place

AVC U16 Championship record
Year	Round	Position	Pld	W	L	SW	SL	Squad
(China) 2023	Final	Runners Up	7	7	0	19	1	Squad
(Jordan) 2025	Semifinals	Third Place	8	7	1	22	8	Squad
Total	0 Title	2/2	15	14	1	41	9	—N/a

== Head coaches ==
Name	Tournament
(China) Kuang Qi	2023 Asian U16 Volleyball Championship
(China) Zhao Yong	2024 U17 World Championship
(China) He Qi	2025 Asian U16 Volleyball Championship
(China) Wu Sheng	2026 U17 World Championship (preparation)
(China) Yuan Zhi	2026 U17 World Championship
