= 2026 Girls' U17 NORCECA Pan American Cup =

Tournament details
- Host country: Honduras
- Dates: 24 May–1 June 2026
- Teams: 9
- Venue: (in Tegucigalpa host cities)

Final positions
- Champions: United States (1st title)
- Runners-up: Venezuela
- Third place: Peru

Tournament awards
- MVP: Mesa Jameson (USA)

The 2026 Girls' U17 NORCECA Pan American Cup was the second edition of the biennial women's volleyball tournament. Nine teams participated in this edition held in Tegucigalpa.

The United States won the first title, after defeated Venezuela 3–1 in final. Mesa Jameson of the United States won the Most Valuable Player award.

== Preliminary round ==
=== Group A ===
Pos	Team	Pld	W	L	Pts	SW	SL	SR	SPW	SPL	SPR	Qualification
1	United States	2	2	0	10	6	0	MAX	153	108	1.417	Semifinals
2	Puerto Rico	2	1	1	3	3	5	0.600	170	180	0.944	Quarterfinals
3	Dominican Republic	2	0	2	2	2	6	0.333	147	182	0.808	

Date	Time		Score		Set 1	Set 2	Set 3	Set 4	Set 5	Total	Report
26 May	15:00	Puerto Rico	0–3	United States	17–25	20–25	26–28			63–78	
27 May	17:00	Puerto Rico	3–2	Dominican Republic	16–25	25–21	26–28	25–20	15–8	107–102	
28 May	15:00	Dominican Republic	0–3	United States	12–25	19–25	14–25			45–75	

=== Group B ===
Pos	Team	Pld	W	L	Pts	SW	SL	SR	SPW	SPL	SPR	Qualification
1	Peru	2	2	0	9	6	1	6.000	169	120	1.408	Semifinals
2	Canada	2	1	1	6	4	3	1.333	151	143	1.056	Quarterfinals
3	Honduras	2	0	2	0	0	6	0.000	93	150	0.620	

Date	Time		Score		Set 1	Set 2	Set 3	Set 4	Set 5	Total	Report
26 May	19:00	Honduras	0–3	Canada	18–25	21–25	10–25			49–75	
27 May	19:00	Peru	3–1	Canada	19–25	25–20	25–19	25–12		94–76	
28 May	19:00	Honduras	0–3	Peru	15–25	19–25	10–25			44–75	

=== Group C ===
Pos	Team	Pld	W	L	Pts	SW	SL	SR	SPW	SPL	SPR	Qualification
1	Venezuela	2	2	0	8	6	2	3.000	175	146	1.199	Quarterfinals
2	Mexico	2	1	1	5	5	5	1.000	206	186	1.108	Quarterfinals
3	Costa Rica	2	0	2	2	2	6	0.333	131	180	0.728	

Date	Time		Score		Set 1	Set 2	Set 3	Set 4	Set 5	Total	Report
26 May	17:00	Venezuela	3–0	Costa Rica	25–11	25–18	25–16			75–45	
27 May	15:00	Mexico	3–2	Costa Rica	18–25	25–10	25–13	22–25	15–13	105–86	
28 May	17:00	Venezuela	3–2	Mexico	25–21	12–25	25–17	23–25	15–13	100–101	

== Bracket ==
Quarterfinals
A2	Puerto Rico	0
C1	Venezuela	3
C2	Mexico	1
B2	Canada	3

Semifinals
B1	Peru	0
C1	Venezuela	3
A1	United States	3
B2	Canada	0

Final
C1	Venezuela	1
A1	United States	3
Third place
B1	Peru	3
B2	Canada	2

== Quarterfinals ==
Date	Time		Score		Set 1	Set 2	Set 3	Set 4	Set 5	Total	Report
29 May	17:00	Canada	3–1	Mexico	25–22	25–23	22–25	25–20		97–90	
29 May	19:00	Venezuela	3–0	Puerto Rico	25–19	25–16	25–12			75–47	

== 9th place match ==
Date	Time		Score		Set 1	Set 2	Set 3	Set 4	Set 5	Total	Report
29 May	15:00	Costa Rica	3–1	Honduras	25–21	25–17	17–25	25–16		92–79	

== 7th place match ==
Date	Time		Score		Set 1	Set 2	Set 3	Set 4	Set 5	Total	Report
30 May	15:00	Dominican Republic	2–3	Costa Rica	11–25	15–25	25–11	25–18	9–15	85–94	

== 5th place match ==
Date	Time		Score		Set 1	Set 2	Set 3	Set 4	Set 5	Total	Report
31 May	12:00	Mexico	3–1	Puerto Rico	16–25	25–19	25–20	25–12		91–76	

== Semifinals ==
Date	Time		Score		Set 1	Set 2	Set 3	Set 4	Set 5	Total	Report
30 May	17:00	Peru	0–3	Venezuela	30–32	24–26	20–25			74–83	
30 May	19:00	United States	3–0	Canada	25–21	25–11	25–17			75–49	

== 3rd place match ==
Date	Time		Score		Set 1	Set 2	Set 3	Set 4	Set 5	Total	Report
31 May	14:00	Peru	3–2	Canada	25–18	21–25	21–25	25–19	15–10	107–97	

== Final ==
Date	Time		Score		Set 1	Set 2	Set 3	Set 4	Set 5	Total	Report
31 May	16:00	Venezuela	1–3	United States	14–25	16–25	25–20	20–25		75–95	

== Final standing ==
Rank	Team
1st place, gold medalist(s)	United States
2nd place, silver medalist(s)	Venezuela
3rd place, bronze medalist(s)	Peru
4	Canada
5	Mexico
6	Puerto Rico
7	Costa Rica
8	Dominican Republic
9	Honduras

== Individual awards ==
- Most valuable player
  - Mesa Jameson (USA)
- Best scorer
  - Yaleska Colina (VEN)
- Best setter
  - Sophia Gregg (USA)
- Best Opposite
  - Amanda Pacheco (VEN)
- Best spikers
  - Valentina Valera (PER)
  - Fernanda Pinto (PER)
- Best blockers
  - Valeria Castejon (HON)
  - Madlen Gloessner (USA)
- Best libero
  - Nahomi Valverde (CRC)
- Best server
  - Valeria Castejon (HON)
- Best receiver
  - Mesa Jameson (USA)
- Best digger
  - Nahomi Valverde (CRC)
