= 2024 FIVB Volleyball Girls' U17 World Championship =

Volleyball competition held in Peru

Campeonato Mundial de Voleibol Femenino Sub-17 de 2024

Tournament details
- Host country: Peru
- City: Lima
- Dates: 17–24 August 2024
- Teams: 16 (from 5 confederations)
- Venue: 2 (in 1 host city)

Final positions
- Champions: China (1st title)
- Runners-up: Japan
- Third place: Italy
- Fourth place: Chinese Taipei

Tournament awards
- MVP: (China) Yang Shuming
- Best Setter: (China) Zhang Zixuan
- Best OH: (Japan) Saya Nakayama (Italy) Ludovica Tosini
- Best MB: (China) Chen Xiaohui (Italy) Alice Guerra
- Best OPP: (China) Yang Shuming
- Best Libero: (Japan) Kokoro Semba

Tournament statistics
- Matches played: 56

The 2024 FIVB Volleyball Girls' U17 World Championship was the inaugural edition of the FIVB Volleyball Girls' U17 World Championship, the biennial international youth volleyball championship contested by the women's national teams under the age of 17 of the members associations of the Fédération Internationale de Volleyball (FIVB), the sport's global governing body. The tournament took place in Lima, Peru from 17 to 24 August 2024.

The FIVB U17 World Championship for both genders was proposed by the FIVB Volleyball Council and unanimously approved by the FIVB Board of Administration during its meeting held in March 2022.

With a victorious streak of seven wins in seven matches and only one set lost, China clinched the first FIVB Girls' U17 World Championship title with a 3–0 win over Japan in the final. Italy completed the podium after defeating Chinese Taipei 3–1 in the third place match.

== Host selection ==
On 8 November 2023, FIVB opened the bidding process for member associations whose countries were interested in hosting the Girls' and Boys' U17 World Championships planned to take place between 1 and 31 August 2024. The expression of interest of the member associations had to be submitted to FIVB no later than 18:00 CET (UTC+1) on 8 December 2023.

FIVB announced the hosts for both Girls' and Boys' U17 World Championships on 28 February 2024, with Peru being selected to host the inaugural edition of the Girls' U17 World Championship. Peru had previously hosted three FIVB Age Group World Championships: the Girls' U18 World Championship in 2015 and the Women's U20 World Championship in 1989 and 2011.

=== Venues ===
San Borja	Locations of venues in Lima metropolitan area.
Coliseo Eduardo Dibós	Locations of venues in Lima metropolitan area.
Capacity: 4,600	Locations of venues in Lima metropolitan area.
Villa El Salvador	Locations of venues in Lima metropolitan area.
Polideportivo Villa El Salvador	Locations of venues in Lima metropolitan area.
Capacity: 5.034	Locations of venues in Lima metropolitan area.

On 5 April 2024, Peruvian Volleyball Federation President Gino Vegas confirmed Lima as the host city, with Coliseo Eduardo Dibós, in San Borja District, and Polideportivo Villa El Salvador, in Villa El Salvador district, as venues of the competition.

== Qualification ==
The qualification process was announced on 28 March 2023 with a total of 16 national teams to qualify for the final tournament. In addition to Peru who qualified automatically as the host, 15 other teams qualified through five separate continental championships which were required to be held by 31 December 2023 at the latest.

The originally slot allocation was set as follows:

- AVC (Asia & Oceania): 3
- CAVB (Africa): 3
- CEV (Europe): 3
- CSV (South America): 3
- NORCECA (North, Central America and Caribbean): 3
- Host: 1

However, the African Volleyball Confederation saw its quota reduced from 3 to 1 because its qualifying tournament only fielded three teams, instead of the minimum 4 teams required. FIVB decided to award these two places to the best fourth-place national teams from the remaining continental qualifiers, based on the Girls' U19 FIVB World Ranking: Thailand (ranked 5) and Dominican Republic (ranked 13).

Confederation	Qualifying tournament	Team qualified
AVC (Asia & Oceania)	2023 Asian Women's U16 Volleyball Championship ( (China) Hangzhou, 1–8 July)	Japan
AVC (Asia & Oceania)	2023 Asian Women's U16 Volleyball Championship ( (China) Hangzhou, 1–8 July)	China
AVC (Asia & Oceania)	2023 Asian Women's U16 Volleyball Championship ( (China) Hangzhou, 1–8 July)	Chinese Taipei
AVC (Asia & Oceania)	Girls' U19 FIVB World Ranking	Thailand
CAVB (Africa)	2023 U17 Girls' African Nations Volleyball Championship ( (Nigeria) Abuja, 2–7 December)	Egypt
CEV (Europe)	2023 Women's U17 European Volleyball Championship ( (Serbia) Vrnjačka Banja and (Hungary) Békéscsaba, 11–23 July)	Italy
CEV (Europe)	2023 Women's U17 European Volleyball Championship ( (Serbia) Vrnjačka Banja and (Hungary) Békéscsaba, 11–23 July)	Turkey
CEV (Europe)	2023 Women's U17 European Volleyball Championship ( (Serbia) Vrnjačka Banja and (Hungary) Békéscsaba, 11–23 July)	Croatia
CSV (South America)	2023 Girls' U17 South American Volleyball Championship ( (Peru) Lima, 27 September–1 October)	Argentina
CSV (South America)	2023 Girls' U17 South American Volleyball Championship ( (Peru) Lima, 27 September–1 October)	Brazil
CSV (South America)	2023 Girls' U17 South American Volleyball Championship ( (Peru) Lima, 27 September–1 October)	Ecuador (Note: Ecuador, which finished fourth at the South American U17 Volleyball Championship, qualified after Peru (third place) was confirmed as the host country for the World Championship, freeing one more place for the South American Volleyball Confederation.)
CSV (South America)	Host nation	Peru
NORCECA (North, Central America and Caribbean)	2023 Girls' U17 NORCECA Volleyball Championship ( (Honduras) Tegucigalpa, 21–26 November)	Mexico
NORCECA (North, Central America and Caribbean)	2023 Girls' U17 NORCECA Volleyball Championship ( (Honduras) Tegucigalpa, 21–26 November)	Puerto Rico
NORCECA (North, Central America and Caribbean)	2023 Girls' U17 NORCECA Volleyball Championship ( (Honduras) Tegucigalpa, 21–26 November)	Canada
NORCECA (North, Central America and Caribbean)	Girls' U19 FIVB World Ranking	Dominican Republic

== Pools composition ==
The draw for the pools composition was held on 1 May 2024, 14:30 (UTC±0), at the FIVB headquarters in Lausanne, Switzerland. The 16 teams were split into four pools of six. The hosts Peru and the top three teams of the Girls' U19 FIVB World Ranking in force at that time were seeded in the first positions of each pool in alphabetical order from pool A to pool D. FIVB reserved the right to seed the host team as head of pool A regardless of their position in the World Ranking. The remaining 16 teams were divided into three pots of four, according to their position in the same Girls' U19 FIVB World Ranking, in order to be drawn to complete the following three positions in each pool.

Girls' U19 FIVB World Ranking of each team (as of 24 August 2023) are shown in brackets, except the hosts Peru who ranked 22nd.

Seeded teams	Teams to be drawn		
Line 1	Pot 1 (line 2)	Pot 2 (line 3)	Pot 3 (line 4)
Peru (Hosts, assigned to A1); Turkey (2), assigned to B1); Italy (3), assigned to C1; Japan (4), assigned to D1	Thailand (5); Brazil (6); Croatia (7); Argentina (8)	China (9); Egypt (10); Dominican Republic (13); Puerto Rico (14)	Mexico (21); Canada (23); Chinese Taipei (24); Ecuador (57)

The draw procedure followed the serpentine system and was as follows:

- Teams from pot 3 were drawn first and were placed in line 4 of each pool starting from pool D to pool A.
- Teams from pot 2 were then drawn and placed in line 3 of each pool starting from pool A to pool D.
- Teams from pot 1 were drawn at the end and were placed in line 2 of each pool starting from pool D to pool A.

The pools composition after the draw was as follow:

Pool A
Pos	Team
A1	Peru
A2	Brazil
A3	Dominican Republic
A4	Canada

Pool B
Pos	Team
B1	Turkey
B2	Thailand
B3	China
B4	Ecuador

Pool C
Pos	Team
C1	Italy
C2	Argentina
C3	Egypt
C4	Mexico

Pool D
Pos	Team
D1	Japan
D2	Croatia
D3	Puerto Rico
D4	Chinese Taipei

== Squads ==
Each national team had to register a long-list roster with up to 25 players, which eventually had to be reduced to a final list of 12 players. Players born on or after 1 January 2008 were eligible to compete in the tournament.

== Preliminary round ==
Groups A and C took place at Coliseo Eduardo Dibós, while Groups B and D took place at Polideportivo Villa El Salvador. All match times are local times, PET (UTC−5), as listed by FIVB.

=== Pool A ===
Pos	Team	Pld	W	L	Pts	SW	SL	SR	SPW	SPL	SPR	Qualification
1	Brazil	3	3	0	9	9	0	MAX	225	139	1.619	Round of 16
2	Peru (H)	3	2	1	6	6	4	1.500	229	210	1.090	Round of 16
3	Dominican Republic	3	1	2	3	4	7	0.571	219	253	0.866	Round of 16
4	Canada	3	0	3	0	1	9	0.111	172	243	0.708	Round of 16

Source: FIVB
(H) Host

Date	Time		Score		Set 1	Set 2	Set 3	Set 4	Set 5	Total	Report
17 Aug	16:30	Canada	1–3	Dominican Republic	21–25	25–18	18–25	11–25		75–93	P2 Report
17 Aug	19:30	Peru	0–3	Brazil	20–25	15–25	16–25			51–75	P2 Report
18 Aug	16:30	Brazil	3–0	Dominican Republic	25–19	25–16	25–8			75–43	P2 Report
18 Aug	19:30	Peru	3–0	Canada	25–23	25–14	25–14			75–51	P2 Report
19 Aug	16:30	Brazil	3–0	Canada	25–12	25–18	25–16			75–46	P2 Report
19 Aug	19:30	Peru	3–1	Dominican Republic	25–12	25–19	28–30	25–23		103–84	P2 Report

=== Pool B ===
Pos	Team	Pld	W	L	Pts	SW	SL	SR	SPW	SPL	SPR	Qualification
1	China	3	3	0	9	9	1	9.000	250	127	1.969	Round of 16
2	Turkey	3	2	1	6	7	3	2.333	238	236	1.008	Round of 16
3	Thailand	3	1	2	3	3	6	0.500	167	198	0.843	Round of 16
4	Ecuador	3	0	3	0	0	9	0.000	121	225	0.538	Round of 16

Source: FIVB

Date	Time		Score		Set 1	Set 2	Set 3	Set 4	Set 5	Total	Report
17 Aug	11:00	Thailand	0–3	China	16–25	8–25	17–25			41–75	P2 Report
17 Aug	14:00	Turkey	3–0	Ecuador	25–18	25–16	25–14			75–48	P2 Report
18 Aug	11:00	Thailand	3–0	Ecuador	25–14	25–20	25–12			75–46	P2 Report
18 Aug	14:00	Turkey	1–3	China	20–25	25–22	26–28	15–25		86–100	P2 Report
19 Aug	11:00	Turkey	3–0	Thailand	25–23	27–25	25–13			77–61	P2 Report
19 Aug	14:00	China	3–0	Ecuador	25–7	25–5	25–15			75–27	P2 Report

=== Pool C ===
Pos	Team	Pld	W	L	Pts	SW	SL	SR	SPW	SPL	SPR	Qualification
1	Italy	3	3	0	8	9	2	4.500	251	190	1.321	Round of 16
2	Mexico	3	2	1	7	8	3	2.667	243	210	1.157	Round of 16
3	Argentina	3	1	2	3	3	6	0.500	189	205	0.922	Round of 16
4	Egypt	3	0	3	0	0	9	0.000	147	225	0.653	Round of 16

Source: FIVB

Date	Time		Score		Set 1	Set 2	Set 3	Set 4	Set 5	Total	Report
17 Aug	10:30	Argentina	3–0	Egypt	25–18	25–17	25–20			75–55	P2 Report
17 Aug	13:30	Italy	3–2	Mexico	19–25	17–25	25–14	25–19	15–10	101–93	P2 Report
18 Aug	10:30	Argentina	0–3	Mexico	22–25	22–25	19–25			63–75	P2 Report
18 Aug	13:30	Italy	3–0	Egypt	25–10	25–16	25–20			75–46	P2 Report
19 Aug	10:30	Egypt	0–3	Mexico	19–25	14–25	13–25			46–75	P2 Report
19 Aug	13:30	Italy	3–0	Argentina	25–12	25–17	25–22			75–51	P2 Report

=== Pool D ===
Pos	Team	Pld	W	L	Pts	SW	SL	SR	SPW	SPL	SPR	Qualification
1	Japan	3	3	0	9	9	2	4.500	266	201	1.323	Round of 16
2	Chinese Taipei	3	2	1	6	7	4	1.750	236	227	1.040	Round of 16
3	Puerto Rico	3	1	2	3	3	6	0.500	190	205	0.927	Round of 16
4	Croatia	3	0	3	0	2	9	0.222	205	264	0.777	Round of 16

Source: FIVB

Date	Time		Score		Set 1	Set 2	Set 3	Set 4	Set 5	Total	Report
17 Aug	17:00	Croatia	0–3	Puerto Rico	21–25	23–25	11–25			55–75	P2 Report
17 Aug	20:00	Japan	3–1	Chinese Taipei	25–16	20–25	25–13	25–14		95–68	P2 Report
18 Aug	17:00	Croatia	1–3	Chinese Taipei	25–18	14–25	19–25	15–25		73–93	P2 Report
18 Aug	20:00	Japan	3–0	Puerto Rico	25–10	25–23	25–23			75–56	P2 Report
19 Aug	17:00	Puerto Rico	0–3	Chinese Taipei	23–25	16–25	20–25			59–75	P2 Report
19 Aug	20:00	Japan	3–1	Croatia	25–17	21–25	25–15	25–20		96–77	P2 Report

== Final round ==
=== Main path bracket ===
Round of 16
20 Aug
Italy	3
Canada	0
20 Aug
Turkey	3
Puerto Rico	0
20 Aug
Japan	3
Ecuador	0
20 Aug
Peru	3
Argentina	2
20 Aug
Mexico	3
Dominican Republic	0
20 Aug
China	3
Croatia	0
20 Aug
Chinese Taipei	3
Thailand	0
20 Aug
Brazil	3
Egypt	1

Quarter-finals
22 Aug
Italy	3
Turkey	1
22 Aug
Japan	3
Peru	1
22 Aug
Mexico	0
China	3
22 Aug
Chinese Taipei	3
Brazil	1

Semi-finals
23 Aug
Italy	1
Japan	3
23 Aug
China	3
Chinese Taipei	0

Final
24 Aug
Japan	0
China	3
3rd place match
24 Aug
Italy	3
Chinese Taipei	1

=== Round of 16 ===
Winners advanced to the quarter-finals to compete for the 1st to 8th places. Losers competed for the 9th to 16th places.

Venues: CED–Coliseo Eduardo Dibós, POL–Polideportivo Villa El Salvador.

Date	Time	Venue		Score		Set 1	Set 2	Set 3	Set 4	Set 5	Total	Report
20 Aug	10:30	CED	Italy	3–0	Canada	25–19	25–17	25–17			75–53	P2 Report
20 Aug	11:00	POL	Chinese Taipei	3–0	Thailand	25–14	25–15	25–22			75–51	P2 Report
20 Aug	13:30	CED	Brazil	3–1	Egypt	25–18	25–13	15–25	25–12		90–68	P2 Report
20 Aug	14:00	POL	Turkey	3–0	Puerto Rico	25–18	25–7	25–18			75–43	P2 Report
20 Aug	16:30	CED	Mexico	3–0	Dominican Republic	25–18	25–19	25–16			75–53	P2 Report
20 Aug	17:00	POL	China	3–0	Croatia	25–12	25–7	25–11			75–30	P2 Report
20 Aug	19:30	CED	Peru	3–2	Argentina	21–25	25–19	25–20	21–25	15–13	107–102	P2 Report
20 Aug	20:00	POL	Japan	3–0	Ecuador	25–9	25–18	25–15			75–42	P2 Report

=== 9th–16th places ===
The 9th to 16th places will take place at Polideportivo Villa El Salvador.

13th place match
Canada	3
Egypt	2
15th place match
Dominican Republic	3
Ecuador	0

13th–16th semi-finals
Canada	3
Dominican Republic	1
Egypt	3
Ecuador	0

9th–16th quarter-finals
Canada	1
Puerto Rico	3
Dominican Republic	0
Croatia	3
Thailand	3
Egypt	1
Argentina	3
Ecuador	0

9th–12th semi-finals
Puerto Rico	3
Croatia	0
Thailand	2
Argentina	3

9th place match
Puerto Rico	3
Argentina	0
11th place match
Croatia	0
Thailand	3

==== 9th–16th quarter-finals ====
Date	Time		Score		Set 1	Set 2	Set 3	Set 4	Set 5	Total	Report
22 Aug	11:00	Dominican Republic	0–3	Croatia	15–25	20–25	19–25			54–75	P2 Report
22 Aug	14:00	Canada	1–3	Puerto Rico	21–25	25–16	21–25	19–25		86–91	P2 Report
22 Aug	17:00	Thailand	3–1	Egypt	25–13	23–25	25–17	25–13		98–68	P2 Report
22 Aug	20:00	Argentina	3–0	Ecuador	25–14	25–21	25–15			75–50	P2 Report

==== 13th–16th semi-finals ====
Date	Time		Score		Set 1	Set 2	Set 3	Set 4	Set 5	Total	Report
23 Aug	11:00	Canada	3–1	Dominican Republic	26–24	19–25	25–21	25–15		95–85	P2 Report
23 Aug	14:00	Egypt	3–0	Ecuador	25–20	25–21	25–20			75–61	P2 Report

==== 9th–12th semi-finals ====
Date	Time		Score		Set 1	Set 2	Set 3	Set 4	Set 5	Total	Report
23 Aug	17:00	Puerto Rico	3–0	Croatia	25–21	30–28	26–24			81–73	P2 Report
23 Aug	20:00	Thailand	2–3	Argentina	25–15	22–25	25–11	16–25	9–15	97–91	P2 Report

==== 15th place match ====
Date	Time		Score		Set 1	Set 2	Set 3	Set 4	Set 5	Total	Report
24 Aug	9:00	Dominican Republic	3–0	Ecuador	25–17	25–18	25–20			75–55	P2 Report

==== 13th place match ====
Date	Time		Score		Set 1	Set 2	Set 3	Set 4	Set 5	Total	Report
24 Aug	12:00	Canada	3–2	Egypt	25–19	27–25	25–27	20–25	15–13	112–109	P2 Report

==== 11th place match ====
Date	Time		Score		Set 1	Set 2	Set 3	Set 4	Set 5	Total	Report
24 Aug	15:00	Croatia	0–3	Thailand	21–25	17–25	17–25			55–75	P2 Report

==== 9th place match ====
Date	Time		Score		Set 1	Set 2	Set 3	Set 4	Set 5	Total	Report
24 Aug	18:00	Puerto Rico	3–0	Argentina	26–24	25–14	25–21			76–59	P2 Report

=== Final eight ===
The 1st to 8th places will take place at Coliseo Eduardo Dibós.

5th place match
Peru	1
Brazil	3
7th place match
Turkey	3
Mexico	1

5th–8th semi-finals
Turkey	1
Peru	3
Mexico	2
Brazil	3

Quarter-finals
Italy	3
Turkey	1
Japan	3
Peru	1
Mexico	0
China	3
Chinese Taipei	3
Brazil	1

Semi-finals
Italy	1
Japan	3
China	3
Chinese Taipei	0

Final
Japan	0
China	3
3rd place match
Italy	3
Chinese Taipei	1

==== Quarter-finals ====
Date	Time		Score		Set 1	Set 2	Set 3	Set 4	Set 5	Total	Report
22 Aug	10:30	Mexico	0–3	China	10–25	16–25	6–25			32–75	P2 Report
22 Aug	13:30	Chinese Taipei	3–1	Brazil	23–25	25–19	25–20	25–19		98–83	P2 Report
22 Aug	16:30	Italy	3–1	Turkey	21–25	25–15	25–18	25–23		96–81	P2 Report
22 Aug	19:30	Japan	3–1	Peru	25–21	25–15	23–25	25–17		98–78	P2 Report

==== 5th–8th semi-finals ====
Date	Time		Score		Set 1	Set 2	Set 3	Set 4	Set 5	Total	Report
23 Aug	10:30	Mexico	2–3	Brazil	25–20	12–25	26–24	17–25	9–15	89–109	P2 Report
23 Aug	19:30	Turkey	1–3	Peru	22–25	17–25	25–22	21–25		85–97	P2 Report

==== Semi-finals ====
Date	Time		Score		Set 1	Set 2	Set 3	Set 4	Set 5	Total	Report
23 Aug	13:30	China	3–0	Chinese Taipei	25–17	25–15	25–19			75–51	P2 Report
23 Aug	16:30	Italy	1–3	Japan	17–25	11–25	25–20	22–25		75–95	P2 Report

==== 7th place match ====
Date	Time		Score		Set 1	Set 2	Set 3	Set 4	Set 5	Total	Report
24 Aug	10:30	Turkey	3–1	Mexico	25–17	25–19	22–25	25–15		97–76	P2 Report

==== 5th place match ====
Date	Time		Score		Set 1	Set 2	Set 3	Set 4	Set 5	Total	Report
24 Aug	16:30	Peru	1–3	Brazil	13–25	20–25	26–24	7–25		66–99	P2 Report

==== 3rd place match ====
Date	Time		Score		Set 1	Set 2	Set 3	Set 4	Set 5	Total	Report
24 Aug	13:30	Italy	3–1	Chinese Taipei	19–25	25–17	25–20	25–22		94–84	P2 Report

==== Final ====
Date	Time		Score		Set 1	Set 2	Set 3	Set 4	Set 5	Total	Report
24 Aug	19:30	Japan	0–3	China	19–25	22–25	18–25			59–75	P2 Report

== Statistics ==
=== Final standing ===
Rank	Team
1st place, gold medalist(s)	China
2nd place, silver medalist(s)	Japan
3rd place, bronze medalist(s)	Italy
4	Chinese Taipei
5	Brazil
6	Peru
7	Turkey
8	Mexico
9	Puerto Rico
10	Argentina
11	Thailand
12	Croatia
13	Canada
14	Egypt
15	Dominican Republic
16	Ecuador

2024 Girls' U17 World champions

China
First title

12–girl roster
1 Chen Xiaohui, 2 Guo Zhongnan, 3 Si Jingyu, 4 Sun Hongyun, 7 Zhang Zixuan, 9 Jia Jingya, 10 Huang Yuexin, 11 Li Mingjing (L), 12 Yang Shuming (c), 13 Wang Yibo, 14 Feng Linlin, 16 Chang Zixin
Head coach: Yong Zhao

=== Individual awards ===
The following individual awards were presented at the end of the tournament.

- Most valuable player (MVP)
  Yang Shuming (CHN)
- Best setter
  Zhang Zixuan (CHN)
- Best outside spikers
  Saya Nakayama (JPN)
  Ludovica Tosini (ITA)
- Best middle blockers
  Chen Xiaohui (CHN)
  Alice Guerra (ITA)
- Best opposite spiker
  Yang Shuming (CHN)
- Best libero
  Kokoro Semba (JPN)

=== Statistics leaders ===
Best scorers
Rank	Player	Attacks	Blocks	Serves	Total
1	(Argentina) Justina Fortes	116	5	4	125
2	(Puerto Rico) Decelise Champion	95	11	11	117
3	(Japan) Hikari Kudo	105	2	8	115
4	(Peru) Ariana Vásquez	91	3	16	110
5	(China) Huang Yuexin	89	9	10	108

Best attackers
Rank	Player	Spikes	Faults	Shots	%	Total
1	(Argentina) Justina Fortes	116	47	144	37.79	307
2	(Japan) Hikari Kudo	105	24	125	41.34	254
3	(Puerto Rico) Decelise Champion	95	28	109	40.95	232
4	(Peru) Ariana Vásquez	91	40	156	31.71	287
4	(Chinese Taipei) Chen Yi	91	54	90	38.72	235

Best blockers
Rank	Player	Blocks	Faults	Rebounds	Avg	Total
1	(Italy) Alessia Manda	28	12	26	4.00	66
2	(Brazil) Heloísa Andrade	21	7	13	3.00	41
3	(Turkey) Ezel Balık	20	27	24	2.86	71
3	(Dominican Republic) Caroline Rodríguez	20	21	36	2.86	77
5	(Croatia) Sara Lulić	18	24	12	2.57	54

Best servers
Rank	Player	Aces	Faults	Hits	Avg	Total
1	(Canada) Ana Stojanovic	17	19	55	2.43	91
2	(Thailand) Panthita Khongnok	16	5	90	2.29	111
2	(Peru) Ariana Vásquez	16	4	100	2.29	120
4	(China) Sun Hongyun	15	11	70	2.14	96
5	(Croatia) Franka Golemac	14	8	63	2.00	85
5	(Japan) Aileen Mcallister	14	11	67	2.00	92

Best setters
Rank	Player	Running	Faults	Still	Avg	Total
1	(Chinese Taipei) Chang Ting-wei	192	8	457	27.43	657
2	(Thailand) Panthita Khongnok	153	1	413	21.86	567
2	(China) Zhang Zixuan	153	2	307	21.86	462
4	(Japan) Haruka Toki	149	4	518	21.29	671
5	(Turkey) Elif İlhan	110	11	466	15.71	587

Best diggers
Rank	Player	Digs	Faults	Receptions	Avg	Total
1	(Peru) Liana Torres	159	37	53	22.71	249
2	(Mexico) Dibanhi Barrera	141	25	43	20.14	209
3	(Japan) Kokoro Semba	113	23	63	16.14	199
4	(Brazil) Maili Barroso	111	22	35	15.86	168
5	(Turkey) Zeynep Nur Altıntaş	107	24	51	15.29	182

Best receivers
Rank	Player	Excellents	Faults	Serve	%	Total
1	(Mexico) Dibanhi Barrera	65	10	80	41.94	155
2	(Chinese Taipei) Chen Yi	56	7	88	37.09	151
3	(Argentina) Eugenia Martínez	54	17	150	24.43	221
4	(Chinese Taipei) Chen Pin-yu	53	13	50	45.69	116
5	(Peru) Liana Torres	50	14	138	24.75	202

== See also ==
- 2024 FIVB Volleyball Boys' U17 World Championship
