= North, Central America and Caribbean Volleyball Confederation =

Continental sports governing body

North, Central America and Caribbean Volleyball Confederation (NORCECA)
- Abbreviation: NORCECA
- Formation: 1968
- Type: Continental sports organisation
- Headquarters: Santo Domingo, Dominican Republic
- Members: 35 member associations 6 associate members
- President: (Dominican Republic) Cristóbal Marte Hoffiz
- Parent organization: FIVB
- Website: NORCECA.net

The North, Central America and Caribbean Volleyball Confederation (NORCECA) is the international governing body for the sport of volleyball in Northern America, Central America, and the Caribbean. NORCECA is the continental confederation that represents its 35 member associations at the International Volleyball Federation (FIVB) level. It also has six associate members: Bonaire, Saba, Saint Martin, Sint Eustatius, Sint Maarten, and the Turks and Caicos Islands. The confederation is responsible for, among other things, the staging of Olympic and World Championship zone qualification tournaments, as well as continental championships for both men and women in indoor volleyball and beach volleyball. In 2022, NORCECA celebrated its fifty-fourth (54th) anniversary.

== Origins and expansion ==
During the 1966 Caribbean and Central American Games held in San Juan, Puerto Rico, the idea of the NORCECA concept was born. At that time it was known as the Caribbean and Central American Zone. The development of the NORCECA Confederation came from today’s FIVB President, Dr. Rubén Acosta Hernández, in conjunction with several other sportsmen from Puerto Rico, Cuba, Dominican Republic and Haiti. NORCECA was formally created by the FIVB and its President, Paul Liband in 1968, when Canada and the United States of America joined the confederation. Its first Senior Championship was held in Mexico from August 4–9, 1969 and the inaugural game featured Haiti vs. Panama, with Haiti winning 3-0. NORCECA’s first Junior Championship was staged in 1980.

== NORCECA's presidents ==
- Dr. Rubén Acosta Hernández (1968–1984)
- Lcdo. Libertario Pérez, Esq. (1984–1988)
- Lcdo. Luis R. Mendoza, Esq. (1988–2001)
- Lic. Cristóbal Marte Hoffiz (2001–present)

== Affiliated federations ==
=== AFECAVOL (Asociación de Federaciones CentroAmericanas de Voleibol) ===
Code	Nation	Federation
BIZ	Belize	Belize Volleyball Association
CRC	Costa Rica	Federación Costarricense de Voleibol
ESA	El Salvador	Federación Salvadoreña de Voleibol
GUA	Guatemala	Federación Guatemalteca de Voleibol
HON	Honduras	Federación Hondureña de Voleibol
NCA	Nicaragua	Federación Nicaragüense de Voleibol
PAN	Panama	Federación Panameña de Voleibol

=== CAZOVA (Caribbean Zonal Volleyball Association) ===
Code	Nation	Federation
ARU	Aruba	Aruba Volleyball Association
BAH	Bahamas	Bahamas Volleyball Association
BAR	Barbados	Barbados Volleyball Association
BON	Bonaire^{*}	Bonairiaanse Volleyball Bond
CAY	Cayman Islands	Cayman Islands Volleyball Federation
CUW	Curaçao	Curaçaose Volleyball Bond
GDP	Guadeloupe	Ligue de Guadeloupe de Volley-Ball
HAI	Haiti	Haiti Volleyball Association
JAM	Jamaica	Jamaica Volleyball Association
MQE	Martinique	Ligue de Martinique de Volley-Ball
SUR	Suriname	Surinaamse Volleyball Bond
TRI	Trinidad and Tobago	Trinidad and Tobago Volleyball Federation
TCI	Turks and Caicos Islands^{*}	Turks and Caicos Volleyball Association
ISV	United States Virgin Islands	United States Virgin Island Volleyball Association

=== ECVA (Eastern Caribbean Zonal Volleyball Association) ===
Code	Nation	Federation
AGU	Anguilla	Anguilla Volleyball Association
ANT	Antigua and Barbuda	Antigua and Barbuda Volleyball Association
BER	Bermuda	Bermuda Volleyball Association
IVB	British Virgin Islands	British Virgin Islands Volleyball Association
DMA	Dominica	Dominica Volleyball Association
GRN	Grenada	Grenada Volleyball Association
MSR	Montserrat	Montserrat Volleyball Federation
SAB	Saba^{*}	Saba Volleyball Association
SKN	Saint Kitts and Nevis	St. Kitts & Nevis Volleyball Federation
LCA	Saint Lucia	St. Lucia Volleyball Association
MAF	Saint Martin^{*}	Ligue de Volley-Ball de Saint-Martin
VIN	Saint Vincent and the Grenadines	Saint Vincent and the Grenadines Volleyball Association
EUX	Sint Eustatius^{*}	Sint Eustatius Volleyball Association
SXM	Sint Maarten^{*}	Sint Maarten Volleyball Association

=== NCVA (North Central Americas Volleyball Association) ===
Code	Nation	Federation
CAN	Canada	Volleyball Canada
CUB	Cuba	Federación Cubana de Voleibol
DOM	Dominican Republic	Confederación Dominicana de Voleibol
MEX	Mexico	Federación Mexicana de Voleibol
PUR	Puerto Rico	Federación Puertorriqueña de Voleibol
USA	United States	United States Volleyball Association

Note:

^{*} Associate members of NORCECA.

== FIVB World Rankings ==
FIVB Men's Rankings (as of 1 October 2026)
NORCECA*	FIVB	±	National Team	Points
1	4	▲1	United States	358.6
2	13	▲2	Cuba	250.31
3	16	▲2	Canada	209.21
4	24	▲13	Mexico	169.14
5	26	▼4	Puerto Rico	153.6
6	50	▼4	Dominican Republic	103.28
7	59	▲8	Dominica	77.14
8	62	▲2	Saint Lucia	73.67
9	63	▲3	Belize	73.55
10	64	▲4	Barbados	72.33
11	68	▲5	Jamaica	65.79
12	76	▲8	Nicaragua	60.27
13	88	▲29	Guatemala	49
14	97	▲18	Grenada	44.82
15	98	▲15	El Salvador	44.48
16	101	▲17	Bahamas	38.85
17	102	▲17	Bahamas	38.1
18	114	▲19	Suriname	20.68
19	118	▲3	Trinidad and Tobago	17.46
*Local rankings based on FIVB ranking points

FIVB Women's Rankings (as of 2 October 2026)
NORCECA*	FIVB	±	National Team	Points
1	4	▲3	United States	366.4
2	8	▲4	Canada	321.52
3	14	▼3	Dominican Republic	236
4	21	▼2	Mexico	201.88
5	26	▲1	Cuba	172.54
6	27	▼4	Puerto Rico	156.94
7	49	▲1	Bermuda	93.5
8	53	▼4	Saint Lucia	85.9
9	54	▲2	Netherlands Antilles	83.52
10	57	▼6	Barbados	79.9
11	59	▼4	Jamaica	76.7
12	60	▼8	Nicaragua	71
13	61	▼1	Honduras	70.68
14	66	▲1	Guadeloupe	59.38
15	69	▲2	Suriname	55.06
16	70	▼13	Trinidad and Tobago	54.18
17	71	▼10	Costa Rica	53.95
18	76	▼1	El Salvador	48.34
19	78	▼1	Bahamas	44.91
20	96	▼14	Grenada	26.62
*Local rankings based on FIVB ranking points

== Tournaments ==
=== Organised entirely by NORCECA ===
- Men's NORCECA Volleyball Championship
- Women's NORCECA Volleyball Championship
- Men's NORCECA Final Six
- Women's NORCECA Final Six
- Men's NORCECA Final Four
- Women's NORCECA Final Four
- Men's Junior NORCECA Volleyball Championship (men)
- Women's Junior NORCECA Volleyball Championship (women)
- Boys' Youth NORCECA Volleyball Championship (men)
- Girls' Youth NORCECA Volleyball Championship (women)
- NORCECA Beach Volleyball Circuit (men and women)

=== Organised alongside the CSV ===
- Pan-American Games (men and woman)
- Men's Pan-American Volleyball Cup (men)
- Women's Pan-American Volleyball Cup (women)
- Men's Junior Pan-American Volleyball Cup (men)
- Women's Junior Pan-American Volleyball Cup (women)
- Boys' Youth Pan-American Volleyball Cup (men)
- Girls' Youth Pan-American Volleyball Cup (women)
- Boys' U17 NORCECA Pan American Volleyball Cup (men)
- Girls' U17 NORCECA Pan American Volleyball Cup (women)
- Final Four Women's Volleyball Cup (women)

==== Current champions ====
	Senior Pan-American Cup (M / W)	U23 Pan-American Cup (M / W)	Junior Pan-American Cup (M / W)	Youth Pan-American Cup (M / W)	U17 Pan-American Cup (M / W)
Men	United States (2026)	United States (2026)	United States (2026)	United States (2025)	Venezuela (2026)
Women	United States (2026)	United States (2026)	United States (2026)	United States (2025)	United States (2026)

== Title holders ==
=== Volleyball ===
	Championship	Final Four	U–21	U–19	U–17
Men	United States (2026)	Puerto Rico (2026)	United States (2024)	Canada (2026)	Puerto Rico (2025)
Women	Canada (2026)	Mexico (2026)	United States (2024)	United States (2026)	United States (2025)

== Sponsors ==
Sponsors of NORCECA
- FIVB
- Mikasa
- Senoh
- Mizuno
