= FIVB Volleyball Girls' U17 World Championship =

- Upcoming season or competition: 2026 FIVB Volleyball Girls' U17 World Championship
- Sport: Volleyball
- Founded: 2022; 4 years ago
- First season: 2024
- No. of teams: 24
- Continent: International (FIVB)
- Most recent champion: United States (1st title)
- Most titles: China; United States (1 title each)

The FIVB Volleyball Girls' U17 World Championship is the biennial international youth volleyball championship contested by the women's national teams under the age of 17 of the members associations of the Fédération Internationale de Volleyball (FIVB), the sport's global governing body.

The FIVB U17 World Championship for both genders was proposed by the FIVB Volleyball Council and unanimously approved by the FIVB Board of Administration during its meeting held in March 2022.

The first edition was staged in 2024 in Lima, Peru and was attended by 16 teams with plans to be expanded in subsequent editions. In April 2025, FIVB announced that the structure of the U17 events would be adapted to that of the U19 and U21 World Championships, featuring 24 teams, the same qualification processes and competition formats.

A corresponding tournament for male players is the FIVB Volleyball Boys' U17 World Championship.

== Results summary ==
Year	Host	Final			3rd place match			Teams
Year	Host	Champions	Score	Runners-up	3rd place	Score	4th place	Teams
2024; Details	(Peru); Lima	China	3–0	Japan	Italy	3–1	Chinese Taipei	16
2026; Details	(Chile); Santiago	United States	3–0	Turkey	China	3–1	Chinese Taipei	24

== Medal table ==
Rank	Nation	Gold	Silver	Bronze	Total
1	China	1	0	1	2
2	United States	1	0	0	1
3	Japan	0	1	0	1
3	Turkey	0	1	0	1
5	Italy	0	0	1	1
Totals (5 entries)		2	2	2	6

== Appearance ==
Legend

- 1st – Champions
- 2nd – Runners-up
- 3rd – Third place
- 4th – Fourth place
- • – Did not enter / Did not qualify
- – Hosts
- Q – Qualified for forthcoming tournament

Team	(Peru); 2024 (16)	(Chile); 2026 (24)	Total
Algeria	•	24th	1
Argentina	10th	12th	2
Brazil	5th	17th	2
Canada	13th	•	1
Chile	•	22nd	1
China	1st	3rd	2
Chinese Taipei	4th	4th	2
Croatia	12th	8th	2
Czech Republic	•	16th	1
Dominican Republic	15th	10th	2
Ecuador	16th	•	1
Egypt	14th	23rd	2
Italy	3rd	5th	2
Japan	2nd	11th	2
Mexico	8th	19th	2
Peru	6th	13th	2
Philippines	•	15th	1
Poland	•	9th	1
Puerto Rico	9th	21st	2
South Korea	•	6th	1
Spain	•	18th	1
Thailand	11th	7th	2
Tunisia	•	20th	1
Turkey	7th	2nd	2
United States	•	1st	1
Venezuela	•	14th	1

== Most valuable player by edition ==
- 2024 – Yang Shuming (CHN)
- 2026 – Kari Knotts (USA)

== See also ==
- FIVB Volleyball Boys' U17 World Championship
- FIVB Volleyball Women's U21 World Championship
- FIVB Volleyball Girls' U19 World Championship
