= Volleyball records and statistics =

The following articles list indoor volleyball, beach volleyball, snow volleyball and sitting volleyball records and statistics:

== Achievements ==
=== Nations ===
Indoor volleyball, beach volleyball and sitting volleyball

- Major achievements in volleyball by nation

Indoor volleyball

- List of indoor volleyball world medalists

=== Clubs ===
- Clubs with the most international titles in volleyball

=== Players, coaches, officials, and leaders ===
- International Volleyball Hall of Fame

== Rankings ==
=== Indoor volleyball ===
Worldwide (FIVB)

- FIVB World Rankings

Europe (CEV)

- CEV European Rankings (Men's Ranking List, Women's Ranking List)

=== Beach volleyball ===
Worldwide (FIVB)

- FIVB Beach Volleyball World Rankings

Europe (CEV)

- CEV Beach Volleyball European Rankings (Entry Rankings, Country Ranking)

=== Snow volleyball ===
Europe (CEV)

- CEV Snow Volleyball European Rankings (Entry Rankings)

=== Sitting volleyball ===
Worldwide (WPV)

- WPV Sitting Volleyball World Rankings (World Rankings)

Europe (PVE)

- PVE Sitting Volleyball European Rankings (European Rankings)

== Major international indoor volleyball tournaments ==
=== Worldwide (FIVB) ===
The Fédération Internationale de Volleyball (FIVB) organizes the following international indoor volleyball tournaments:

Nations (senior)

Tournament	Article	Records and statistics
Summer Olympics	Volleyball at the Summer Olympics	Results summary (men, women), participating nations (men, women), medal table, MVP by edition, win–loss records
Summer Olympics	List of Olympic medalists in volleyball	Medalists, statistics
Summer Olympics	List of Olympic venues in volleyball	Venues
Men's World Championship	FIVB Men's Volleyball World Championship	Results summary, hosts, medals summary, MVP by edition
Men's World Championship	National team appearances in the FIVB Men's Volleyball World Championship	Summary
Women's World Championship	FIVB Women's Volleyball World Championship	Results summary, all-time performance, hosts, medals summary, MVP by edition
Women's World Championship	List of FIVB Women's Volleyball World Championship qualifications	Qualifications
Women's World Championship	List of FIVB Women's Volleyball World Championship finals	List of finals, results by nation, results by confederation
Women's World Championship	National team appearances in the FIVB Volleyball Women's World Championship	Debut of national teams, summary
Men's World Cup	FIVB Volleyball Men's World Cup	Results summary, medals summary, participating nations, MVP by edition
Women's World Cup	FIVB Volleyball Women's World Cup	Results summary, medals summary, participating nations, MVP by edition
World Grand Champions Cup	FIVB Volleyball World Grand Champions Cup	Results summary, medals summary, MVP by edition
Men's Nations League	FIVB Men's Volleyball Nations League	Hosts, appearance, results summary, medals summary, MVP by edition, team performances by season
Men's Nations League	FIVB Men's Volleyball Nations League statistics	Results summary, medals summary, team participations, statistics leaders, individual awards, all-time team records
Women's Nations League	FIVB Women's Volleyball Nations League	Hosts, appearance, results summary, medals summary, MVP by edition, team performances by season
Women's Nations League	FIVB Women's Volleyball Nations League statistics	Results summary, medals summary, team participations, statistics leaders, individual awards, all-time team records
Men's Challenger Cup	FIVB Men's Volleyball Challenger Cup	Hosts, appearance, results summary
Women's Challenger Cup	FIVB Women's Volleyball Challenger Cup	Hosts, appearance, results summary
World League (defunct)	FIVB Volleyball World League (men's)	Hosts, appearance, results summary, medals summary, MVP by edition
World League (defunct)	FIVB Volleyball World League statistics	Summary I, summary II
World Grand Prix (defunct)	FIVB Volleyball World Grand Prix (women's)	Hosts, appearance, results summary, medals summary, MVP by edition
World Grand Prix (defunct)	FIVB Volleyball World Grand Prix statistics	Statistics

Nations (under-age)

Tournament	Article	Records and statistics
Youth Olympic Games	Volleyball at the Youth Olympic Games	
Men's U23 World Championship	FIVB Volleyball Men's U23 World Championship	Results summary, medals summary, appearance, MVP by edition
Women's U23 World Championship	FIVB Volleyball Women's U23 World Championship	Results summary, medals summary, appearance, MVP by edition
Men's U21 World Championship	FIVB Volleyball Men's U21 World Championship	Results summary, medals table, appearance, MVP by edition
Women's U20 World Championship	FIVB Volleyball Women's U20 World Championship	Results summary, medals table, appearance, MVP by edition
Boys' U19 World Championship	FIVB Volleyball Boys' U19 World Championship	Results summary, medals summary, appearance, MVP by edition
Girls' U18 World Championship	FIVB Volleyball Girls' U18 World Championship	Results summary, medals summary, appearance, MVP by edition

Clubs

Tournament	Article	Records and statistics
Men's Club World Championship	FIVB Volleyball Men's Club World Championship	Results summary, medals summary, MVP by edition
Women's Club World Championship	FIVB Volleyball Women's Club World Championship	Results summary, medals summary, MVP by edition

=== Africa (CAVB) ===
The Confédération Africaine de Volleyball (CAVB) organizes the following international indoor volleyball tournaments:

Nations (senior)

Tournament	Article	Records and statistics
Men's African Championship	Men's African Volleyball Championship	Results summary, medal summary, participating nations
Women's African Championship	Women's African Volleyball Championship	Results summary, medal summary, participating nations
African Games	Volleyball at the African Games	Results summary (men, women), medal table (men, women)

Nations (under-age)

Tournament	Article	Records and statistics
Men's U23 African Championship	Men's U23 African Volleyball Championship	Results summary, participating nations, performance by nation
Women's U23 African Championship	Women's U23 African Volleyball Championship	Results summary, medal summary, participation by nation, MVP by edition
Men's U21 African Championship	African Volleyball Championship U21 (men's)	Results summary, performance by nation
Women's U20 African Championship	Women's Africa Volleyball Championship U20	Results summary, medal summary, participation by nation, MVP by edition
Boys' U19 African Championship	African Volleyball Championship U19 (boys')	Results summary, performance by nation
Girls' U18 African Championship	Girls' Africa Volleyball Championship U18	Results summary, participation by nation, MVP by edition

Clubs

Tournament	Article	Records and statistics
African Clubs Championship	African Clubs Championship (volleyball) (men's)	Results summary, wins by club, wins by country
Women's African Clubs Championship	Women's African Clubs Championship (volleyball)	Results summary, wins by club, wins by country

=== Asia & Oceania (AVC) ===
The Asian Volleyball Confederation (AVC) organizes the following international indoor volleyball tournaments:

Nations (senior)

Tournament	Article	Records and statistics
Asian Men's Championship	Asian Men's Volleyball Championship	Results summary, medal summary, participating nations, awards
Asian Women's Championship	Asian Women's Volleyball Championship	Results summary, medal summary, participating nations, awards
Asian Men's Cup	Asian Men's Volleyball Cup	Results summary, medal summary, participating nations, awards
Asian Women's Cup	Asian Women's Volleyball Cup	Results summary, medal summary, participating nations, awards
Asian Men's Challenge Cup	Asian Men's Volleyball Challenge Cup	Results summary, participating nations
Asian Women's Challenge Cup	Asian Women's Volleyball Challenge Cup	Results summary, participating nations
Asian Games	Volleyball at the Asian Games	Results summary, medal table, participating nations
Volleyball at the Pacific Games	Volleyball at the Pacific Games	Results summary (Pacific Games, Pacific Mini Games)

Nations (under-age)

Tournament	Article	Records and statistics
Asian Men's U23 Championship	Asian Men's U23 Volleyball Championship	Results summary, medal summary, participating nations, awards
Asian Women's U23 Championship	Asian Women's U23 Volleyball Championship	Results summary, medal summary, participating nations, awards
Asian Men's U20 Championship	Asian Men's U20 Volleyball Championship	Results summary, medal summary, participating nations, awards
Asian Women's U19 Championship	Asian Women's U19 Volleyball Championship	Results summary, medal summary, participating nations, awards
Asian Boys' U19 Championship	Asian Boys' U19 Volleyball Championship	Results summary, medal summary, participating nations, awards
Asian Girls' U17 Championship	Asian Girls' U17 Volleyball Championship	Results summary, medal summary, participating nations, awards

Clubs

Tournament	Article	Records and statistics
AVC Club Championship	Men's and Women's AVC Club Volleyball Championship	Results summary (men, women), medal table by club (women), titles by country (men, women), MVP by edition (men, women)

=== Europe (CEV) ===
The Confédération Européenne de Volleyball (CEV) organizes the following international indoor volleyball tournaments:

Nations (senior)

Tournament	Article	Records and statistics
Men's European Championship	Men's European Volleyball Championship	Results summary, total hosts, medals summary, participating nations, MVP by edition
Women's European Championship	Women's European Volleyball Championship	Results summary, medals summary, participating nations, MVP by edition
European Championship of the Small Countries Division	European Volleyball Championship of the Small Countries Division	Results summary
Men's European League	Men's European Volleyball League	Results summary, medals summary
Women's European League	Women's European Volleyball League	Results summary, medals summary
European Games	Volleyball at the European Games	

Nations (under-age)

Tournament	Article	Records and statistics
Men's Junior European Championship	Men's Junior European Volleyball Championship	Results summary, medals summary
Women's Junior European Championship	Women's Junior European Volleyball Championship	Results summary, medals summary, participating nations
Boys' Youth European Championship	Boys' Youth European Volleyball Championship	Results summary, medals summary, participating nations
Girls' Youth European Championship	Girls' Youth European Volleyball Championship	Results summary, medals summary, participating nations

Clubs

Tournament	Article	Records and statistics
CEV Champions League	CEV Champions League (men's)	Title holders, finals, titles by club, titles by country, MVP by edition
CEV Women's Champions League	CEV Women's Champions League	Finals, titles by club, titles by country, MVP by edition
CEV Cup	CEV Cup (men's)	Results summary, titles by club
Women's CEV Cup	Women's CEV Cup	Results summary, titles by club, titles by country
CEV Challenge Cup	CEV Challenge Cup (men's)	Results summary
CEV Women's Challenge Cup	CEV Women's Challenge Cup	Results summary, titles by club, titles by country

=== Americas (NORCECA & CSV) ===
The North, Central America and Caribbean Volleyball Confederation (NORCECA) and the Confederación Sudamericana de Voleibol (CSV) organize the following international indoor volleyball tournaments:

Nations (senior)

Tournament	Article	Records and statistics
Pan American Games	Volleyball at the Pan American Games	Results summary (men, women), medal table (men, women), MVP by edition (men, women)
Men's Pan-American Cup	Men's Pan-American Volleyball Cup	Results summary, medal table, teams by year
Women's Pan-American Cup	Women's Pan-American Volleyball Cup	Results summary, medal table, teams by year, MVP by edition

Nations (under-age)

Tournament	Article	Records and statistics
Men's U23 Pan-American Cup	Men's U23 Pan-American Volleyball Cup	Results summary, medal table, teams by year, MVP by edition
Women's U23 Pan-American Cup	Women's U23 Pan-American Volleyball Cup	Results summary, medal table, teams by year, MVP by edition
Men's Junior Pan-American Cup	Men's Junior Pan-American Volleyball Cup	Results summary, medal table
Women's Junior Pan-American Cup	Women's Junior Pan-American Volleyball Cup	Results summary, medal table, MVP by edition
Boys' Youth Pan-American Cup	Boys' Youth Pan-American Volleyball Cup	Results summary, medal table
Girls' Youth Pan-American Cup	Girls' Youth Pan-American Volleyball Cup	Results summary, medal table

==== North America (NORCECA) ====
The North, Central America and Caribbean Volleyball Confederation (NORCECA) organizes the following international indoor volleyball tournaments:

Nations (senior)

Tournament	Article	Records and statistics
Men's NORCECA Championship	Men's NORCECA Volleyball Championship	Results summary, medals summary, MVP by edition
Women's NORCECA Championship	Women's NORCECA Volleyball Championship	Results summary, medals summary, MVP by edition
Central American and Caribbean Games	Volleyball at the Central American and Caribbean Games	Results summary (men, women), medal table (men, women)

Nations (under-age)

Tournament	Article	Records and statistics
Men's Junior NORCECA Championship	Men's Junior NORCECA Volleyball Championship	Results summary, medal table
Women's Junior NORCECA Championship	Women's Junior NORCECA Volleyball Championship	Results summary, medal table
Boys' Youth NORCECA Championship	Boys' Youth NORCECA Volleyball Championship	Results summary, medal table
Girls' Youth NORCECA Championship	Girls' Youth NORCECA Volleyball Championship	Results summary, medal table

==== South America (CSV) ====
The Confederación Sudamericana de Voleibol (CSV) organizes the following international indoor volleyball tournaments:

Nations (senior)

Tournament	Article	Records and statistics
Men's South American Championship	Men's South American Volleyball Championship	Results summary, medals summary, MVP by edition
Women's South American Championship	Women's South American Volleyball Championship	Results summary, medals summary, MVP by edition
South American Games	Volleyball at the South American Games	

Nations (under-age)

Tournament	Article	Records and statistics
Men's U23 South American Championship	Men's U23 South American Volleyball Championship	Results summary, medals summary, MVP by edition
Women's U22 South American Championship	Women's U22 South American Volleyball Championship	Results summary, medals summary, MVP by edition
Men's Junior South American Championship	Men's Junior South American Volleyball Championship	Results summary, medals summary
Women's Junior South American Championship	Women's Junior South American Volleyball Championship	Results summary, medals summary, MVP by edition
Boys' Youth South American Championship	Boys' Youth South American Volleyball Championship	Results summary, medals summary
Girls' Youth South American Championship	Girls' Youth South American Volleyball Championship	Results summary, medals summary, MVP by edition
Boys' U17 South American Championship	Boys' U17 South American Volleyball Championship	Results summary, medals summary
Girls' U16 South American Championship	Girls' U16 South American Volleyball Championship	Results summary, medals summary, MVP by edition

Clubs

Tournament	Article	Records and statistics
Men's South American Club Championship	Men's South American Volleyball Club Championship	Results summary, medals summary, MVP by edition
Women's South American Club Championship	Women's South American Volleyball Club Championship	Results summary, medals summary, MVP by edition

== Major national top-level indoor volleyball leagues ==
=== Africa ===
Nation	Article	Records and statistics
Algeria	Algerian Men's Volleyball League	List of champions, titles by team
Algeria	Algerian Women's Volleyball League	List of champions, titles by team
Tunisia	Tunisian Men's Volleyball League	List of champions, titles by club, notable foreign players
Tunisia	Tunisian Women's Volleyball League	List of champions, titles by club

=== Asia & Oceania ===
Nation	Article	Records and statistics
Australia	Australian Volleyball League	
China	Chinese Volleyball Super League	Previous League Winners (men, women), MVP by edition (women), titles by clubs (men, women)
Indonesia	Indonesian men's Proliga	List of champions
Indonesia	Indonesian women's Proliga	Champions
Iran	Iranian Volleyball Super League (men's)	League champions, titles by club, titles by city, notable foreign players
Japan	V.League (Japan)	Previous winners (men, women)
Philippines	Spikers' Turf	Results summary, champions
Philippines	Premier Volleyball League	Conference results, champions, notable records
South Korea	V-League (South Korea)	Champions (men, women)
Chinese Taipei	Enterprise Volleyball League	Results (men, women)
Thailand	Men's Volleyball Thailand League	Results summary, champions, awards
Thailand	Women's Volleyball Thailand League	Results summary, champions, awards

=== Europe ===
Nation	Article	Records and statistics
Albania	Albanian Volleyball League (men's)	Title holders, performance by club
Albania	Albanian Volleyball League (Women)	Winners
Azerbaijan	Azerbaijan Volleyball League (men's)	Champions
Azerbaijan	Azerbaijan Women's Volleyball Super League	List of champions, most successful teams
Belgium	Belgium Men's Volleyball League	List of champions
Belgium	Belgium Women's Volleyball Division of Honour	Previous winners, titles by club
Bosnia and Herzegovina	Premier League of Volleyball of Bosnia and Herzegovina (men's)	Champions, cup winners
Croatia	Croatian 1A Volleyball League	League and Cup winners (men, women)
Finland	Finland Volleyball League (men's)	Champions and medalists
France	Pro A (volleyball) (men's)	Title holders
France	Pro A (women's volleyball)	
Germany	Deutsche Volleyball-Bundesliga	Performance by club (men)
Greece	A1 Ethniki Volleyball (men's)	Title holders, A1 Finals, performance by club, titles won by city
Greece	A1 Ethniki Women's Volleyball	Title holders, performance by club
Italy	Italian Volleyball League (men's)	SuperLega (highest level)
Italy	Italian Women's Volleyball League	Results, titles by club
Montenegro	Montenegrin Volleyball League (men's)	Champions
Montenegro	Montenegrin women's volley league	Champions, all-time participants
Poland	PlusLiga (men's)	General classification, Polish Champions, statistics
Poland	Orlen Liga (women's)	Medallists
Portugal	Portuguese Volleyball First Division (men's)	List of champions, titles by club
Portugal	First Division Women's Volleyball League (Portugal)	Results, titles by club
Romania	Divizia A1 (men's volleyball)	Past winners
Romania	Divizia A1 (women's volleyball)	Past winners
Russia	Russian Volleyball Super League (men's)	Russian Champions, winners of the Soviet championship
Russia	Russian Women's Volleyball Super League	Results, titles by club, Lyudmila Buldakova award
Serbia	Volleyball League of Serbia (men's)	Champions
Serbia	Women's Volleyball League of Serbia	
Slovakia	Slovakia Men's Volleyball League	Champions
Slovenia	Slovenian Volleyball League (men's)	Performance by club
Spain	Superliga de Voleibol Masculina (men's)	Champions by season
Spain	Superliga Femenina de Voleibol (women's)	Champions by season
Sweden	Elitserien (women's volleyball)	Previous winners, titles by team
Turkey	Turkish Men's Volleyball League	Champions, performance by club
Turkey	Turkish Women's Volleyball League	Title holders, performance by club
Ukraine	Ukrainian Men's Volleyball Super League	Champions, performance by club
Ukraine	Ukrainian Women's Volleyball Super League	Champions, performance by club

=== North America ===
Nation	Article	Records and statistics
Dominican Republic	Dominican Republic Volleyball League	Champions (men, women)
Puerto Rico	Liga de Voleibol Superior Masculino (men's)	Champions
Puerto Rico	Liga de Voleibol Superior Femenino (women's)	Champions

=== South America ===
Nation	Article	Records and statistics
Argentina	Liga Argentina de Voleibol – Serie A1 (men's)	Champions
Argentina	Liga Argentina Femenina de Voleibol (women's)	
Brazil	Brazilian Men's Volleyball Superliga	List of champions, titles by team
Brazil	Brazilian Women's Volleyball Superliga	List of champions, titles by team
Peru	Liga Nacional Superior de Voleibol	Results (men, women), MVP by edition (men, women)

== Major international beach volleyball tournaments ==
=== Worldwide (FIVB) ===
The Fédération Internationale de Volleyball (FIVB) organizes the following international beach volleyball tournaments:

Senior

Tournament	Article	Records and statistics
Summer Olympics	Beach volleyball at the Summer Olympics	Results summary, participating nations, medal table
Summer Olympics	List of Olympic medalists in volleyball	Medalists, statistics
Summer Olympics	List of Olympic venues in volleyball	Venues
World Championships	FIVB Beach Volleyball World Championships	Results summary, medal table
World Tour	FIVB Beach Volleyball World Tour	Champions, World Tour finals, award winners

Under-age

Tournament	Article	Records and statistics
Youth Olympic Games	Beach volleyball at the Youth Olympic Games	Medal table, results summary (boys, girls), team appearances (boys, girls)
U23 World Championships	FIVB Beach Volleyball U23 World Championships	Results summary, medals table
U21 World Championships	FIVB Beach Volleyball U21 World Championships	Results summary, medals table
U19 World Championships	FIVB Beach Volleyball U19 World Championships	Results summary, medals table
U17 World Championships	FIVB Beach Volleyball U17 World Championships	Results summary, medals table

=== Africa (CAVB) ===
The Confédération Africaine de Volleyball (CAVB) organizes the following international beach volleyball tournaments:

Senior

Tournament	Article	Records and statistics
African Championships	African Beach Volleyball Championship	
African Games	Volleyball at the African Games	Results summary (men, women)

=== Asia & Oceania (AVC) ===
The Asian Volleyball Confederation (AVC) organizes the following international beach volleyball tournaments:

Senior

Tournament	Article	Records and statistics
Asian Championships	Asian Beach Volleyball Championships	Results summary, medal table
Asian Games	Beach volleyball at the Asian Games	Results summary, medal table, participating nations
Pacific Games	Beach volleyball at the Pacific Games	Results (Pacific Games, Pacific Mini Games)

Under-age

Tournament	Article	Records and statistics
Asian U21 Championships	Asian U21 Beach Volleyball Championships	
Asian U19 Championships	Asian U19 Beach Volleyball Championships	

=== Europe (CEV) ===
The Confédération Européenne de Volleyball (CEV) organizes the following international beach volleyball tournaments:

Senior

Tournament	Article	Records and statistics
European Championships	European Beach Volleyball Championships	Results summary(men, women), medal table(men, women), overall medal count
European Games	Beach volleyball at the European Games	

Under-age

Tournament	Article	Records and statistics
European U22 Championships	European U22 Beach Volleyball Championships	Results summary(men, women), medal table
European U20 Championships	European U20 Beach Volleyball Championships	
European U18 Championships	European U18 Beach Volleyball Championships	

=== Americas (NORCECA & CSV) ===
The North, Central America and Caribbean Volleyball Confederation (NORCECA) and the Confederación Sudamericana de Voleibol (CSV) organize the following international beach volleyball tournaments:

Senior

Tournament	Article	Records and statistics
Pan American Games	Beach volleyball at the Pan American Games	Medal winners (men, women), medal table (men, women)

==== North America (NORCECA) ====
The North, Central America and Caribbean Volleyball Confederation (NORCECA) organizes the following international beach volleyball tournaments:

Senior

Tournament	Article	Records and statistics
NORCECA Circuit	NORCECA Beach Volleyball Circuit	Results summary (men, women)
Central American and Caribbean Games	Beach volleyball at the Central American and Caribbean Games	Medalists (men, women)

==== South America (CSV) ====
The Confederación Sudamericana de Voleibol (CSV) organizes the following international beach volleyball tournaments:

Senior

Tournament	Article	Records and statistics
South American Circuit	South American Beach Volleyball Circuit	Results summary (men, women)
South American Games	Beach volleyball at the South American Games	

== Major international snow volleyball tournaments ==
=== Worldwide (FIVB) ===
The Fédération Internationale de Volleyball (FIVB) organizes the following international snow volleyball tournaments:

Senior

Tournament	Article	Records and statistics
World Championships	FIVB Snow Volleyball World Championships (planned to be held in 2021)	
World Tour	FIVB Snow Volleyball World Tour	

=== Europe (CEV) ===
The Confédération Européenne de Volleyball (CEV) organizes the following international snow volleyball tournaments:

Senior

Tournaments	Articles	Records and statistics
European Championship	European Snow Volleyball Championship (2018 European Championship)	
European Tour	Snow Volleyball European Tour (2018 European Tour 1, 2, 3, 4, 5, 6)	

== Major international sitting volleyball tournaments ==
=== Worldwide (WPV) ===
The World ParaVolley (WPV) organizes the following international sitting volleyball tournaments:

Senior

Tournament	Article	Records and statistics
Summer Paralympics	Volleyball at the Summer Paralympics	Medal summary, participating nations
World Championship	World Para Volleyball Championship	Results summary

=== Europe (PVE) ===
The ParaVolley Europe (PVE) organizes the following international sitting volleyball tournaments:

Senior

Tournaments	Articles	Records and statistics
European Championship	European Para Volleyball Championship	
