= Yuliya Gerasymova =

Ukrainian volleyball player

Personal information
- Native name: Юлія Герасимова (Ukrainian)
- Full name: Yuliya Anatoliivna Gerasymova
- Nationality: Ukrainian
- Born: 15 September 1989 (age 37) Odesa, Ukrainian SSR, Soviet Union (now Ukraine)
- Height: 1.85 m (6 ft 1 in)
- Weight: 76 kg (168 lb)

Volleyball information
- Position: middle blocker
- Current club: CS Rapid Bucuresti

Career
- Years: Team
- 2006–15: VK Khimik Yuzhny
- 2015–16: Orbita-ZTMK-ZNU Zaporizhya
- 2016–18: TED Ankara
- 2018–21: Karayolları Spor Kulübü
- 2021–22: SC Prometey
- 2022–23: Roleski Grupa Azoty ANS Tarnów
- 2023: CS Rapid Bucuresti

National team
- Years: Team
- 2018–2022: Ukraine

Yuliya Anatoliivna Gerasymova (Ukrainian: Юлія Анатоліївна Герасимова, romanized: Yuliia Anatoliivna Herasymova; born September 15, 1989) is a Ukrainian former volleyball player. She has participated in three European Championships.

== Biography ==
=== Early life ===
She was born on September 15, 1989, in Odesa. She was a student at Odesa Children's and Youth Sports School No. 67, with Irina Ishchuk as her first coach.

=== Sports career ===
Throughout her sports career, she played for the teams Khimik, Orbita-ZTMK-ZNU, TED, Karayollari, Prometheus.

As part of the Ukrainian national team, she became the winner of the Euroleague 2017. Participant of three European Championships (2017, 2019, 2021).

=== Master of Sports of Ukraine ===
As a member of the Southern Chemist, she won five national championships and played in the semifinals of the Continental CEV Challenge Cup in the 2014/15 season. After a season in the "Orbit" of Zaporizhzhia, she played for five years in Turkish clubs. In late 2021 she signed a contract with SC Prometey in the Dnipropetrovsk Region with whom she made her debut on December 17 in the Ukrainian championship against Alnanta Dnipro.

On January 18, 2022, SC Prometey played the fourth round of the Champions League against Polish club DevelopRes Rzeszów. During one of the technical breaks, from the bench, she tried to cheer on her partners and her dance became popular on TikTok, receiving more than 90 million views on February 11, 2022.

As a member of the national team, she won the Euroleague 2017. She participated in three European Volleyball Championships.

== Clubs ==
- (Ukraine) VK Khimik (2004–2015)
- (Ukraine) Orbita-ZTMK-ZNU (2015–2016)
- (Turkey) TED Ankara (2016–2018)
- (Turkey) Karayolları Spor Kulübü (2018–2021)
- (Ukraine) SC Prometey (2021–2022)
- (Poland) Roleski Grupa Azoty ANS Tarnów (2022–2023)
- (Romania) CS Rapid Bucuresti (2023)

== Awards ==
=== With the national team ===
- 2017 Women's European Volleyball League - Gold medal

=== With clubs ===
- 2011 Ukrainian Women's Volleyball Super League - Gold medal (VK Khimik)
- 2011 Ukrainian Cup - Runner-up (VK Khimik)
- 2012 Ukrainian Women's Volleyball Super League - Gold medal (VK Khimik)
- 2012 Ukrainian Cup - Runner-up (VK Khimik)
- 2013 Ukrainian Women's Volleyball Super League - Gold medal (VK Khimik)
- 2014 Ukrainian Women's Volleyball Super League - Gold medal (VK Khimik)
- 2014 Ukrainian Cup - Champion (VK Khimik)
- 2015 Ukrainian Women's Volleyball Super League - Gold medal (VK Khimik)
- 2015 Ukrainian Cup - Champion (VK Khimik)
- 2016 Ukrainian Women's Volleyball Super League - Silver medal (Orbita-ZTMK-ZNU Zaporizhya)
