= Major achievements in volleyball by nation =

This article contains lists of achievements in major senior-level international indoor volleyball, beach volleyball and sitting volleyball tournaments according to first-place, second-place and third-place results obtained by teams representing different nations. The objective is not to create combined medal tables; the focus is on listing the best positions achieved by teams in major international tournaments, ranking the nations according to the most podiums accomplished by teams of these nations.

== Results ==
For the making of these lists, results from following major international tournaments were consulted:

Form	Governing body	Tournament	Edition		
Form	Governing body	Tournament	First	Latest	Next
Indoor volleyball	FIVB & IOC	Volleyball at the Summer Olympics (quadrennially)	1964	2024	2028
Indoor volleyball	FIVB	FIVB Volleyball Men's World Championship (biennially)	1949	2025	2027
Indoor volleyball	FIVB	FIVB Volleyball Women's World Championship (biennially)	1952	2025	2027
Indoor volleyball	FIVB	FIVB Volleyball Men's World Cup (quadrennially)	1965	2019	Defunct
Indoor volleyball	FIVB	FIVB Volleyball Women's World Cup (quadrennially)	1973	2019	Defunct
Indoor volleyball	FIVB	FIVB Volleyball World Grand Champions Cup (quadrennially, replaced by the World Championship)	1993	2017	Defunct
Indoor volleyball	FIVB	FIVB Volleyball Men's Nations League (annually)	2018	2026	2027
Indoor volleyball	FIVB	FIVB Volleyball Women's Nations League (annually)	2018	2026	2027
Indoor volleyball	FIVB	FIVB Volleyball World League (annually, replaced by the men's Nations League)	1990	2017	Defunct
Indoor volleyball	FIVB	FIVB Volleyball World Grand Prix (annually, replaced by the women's Nations League)	1993	2017	Defunct
Beach volleyball	FIVB & IOC	Beach volleyball at the Summer Olympics (quadrennially)	1996	2024	2028
Beach volleyball	FIVB	FIVB Beach Volleyball World Championships (biennially)	1997	2025	2027
Beach volleyball	FIVB	FIVB Beach Volleyball World Tour Finals (annually)	2015	2025	2026
Sitting volleyball	WPV & IPC	Volleyball at the Summer Paralympics (quadrennially)	1980	2024	2028
Sitting volleyball	WPV	World ParaVolley Sitting Volleyball World Championship (quadrennially)	1983	2026	2030

- FIVB: Fédération Internationale de Volleyball
- IOC: International Olympic Committee
- IPC: International Paralympic Committee
- WPV: World ParaVolley

Medals for the demonstration events are NOT counted. Medals earned by athletes from defunct National Olympic Committees (NOCs) and National Paralympic Committees (NPCs) or historical teams are NOT merged with the results achieved by their immediate successor states. The International Olympic Committee (IOC) and International Paralympic Committee (IPC) do NOT combine medals of these nations or teams.

The conventions used on these lists are: M for Men's tournament, and W for Women's tournament.

The tables are pre-sorted by total number of first-place results, second-place results and third-place results, then most first-place results, second-place results, respectively. When equal ranks are given, nations are listed in alphabetical order.

=== Indoor volleyball, beach volleyball and sitting volleyball ===
==== Men and women ====
Last updated after the 2026 FIVB Men's Volleyball Nations League (As of 2 August 2026)
		Indoor volleyball										Beach volleyball						Sitting volleyball				Number of			
		Olympic Games		World Champion- ship		World Cup		World Grand Champions Cup		Nations League / World League	Nations League / Grand Prix	Olympic Games		World Champion- ships		World Tour Finals		Paralympic Games		World Champion- ship		Number of			
Rk.	Nation	M	W	M	W	M	W	M	W	M	W	M	W	M	W	M	W	M	W	M	W	1st place, gold medalist(s)	2nd place, silver medalist(s)	3rd place, bronze medalist(s)	Total
1	Brazil	1st place, gold medalist(s)	1st place, gold medalist(s)	1st place, gold medalist(s)	2nd place, silver medalist(s)	1st place, gold medalist(s)	2nd place, silver medalist(s)	1st place, gold medalist(s)	1st place, gold medalist(s)	1st place, gold medalist(s)	1st place, gold medalist(s)	1st place, gold medalist(s)	1st place, gold medalist(s)	1st place, gold medalist(s)	1st place, gold medalist(s)	1st place, gold medalist(s)	1st place, gold medalist(s)		3rd place, bronze medalist(s)	2nd place, silver medalist(s)	1st place, gold medalist(s)	15	3	1	19
2	United States	1st place, gold medalist(s)	1st place, gold medalist(s)	1st place, gold medalist(s)	1st place, gold medalist(s)	1st place, gold medalist(s)	2nd place, silver medalist(s)	2nd place, silver medalist(s)	2nd place, silver medalist(s)	1st place, gold medalist(s)	1st place, gold medalist(s)	1st place, gold medalist(s)	1st place, gold medalist(s)	1st place, gold medalist(s)	1st place, gold medalist(s)	1st place, gold medalist(s)	1st place, gold medalist(s)		1st place, gold medalist(s)		1st place, gold medalist(s)	15	3	0	18
3	Russia	1st place, gold medalist(s)	2nd place, silver medalist(s)	2nd place, silver medalist(s)	1st place, gold medalist(s)	1st place, gold medalist(s)	2nd place, silver medalist(s)	2nd place, silver medalist(s)	1st place, gold medalist(s)	1st place, gold medalist(s)	1st place, gold medalist(s)			1st place, gold medalist(s)		1st place, gold medalist(s)		3rd place, bronze medalist(s)			3rd place, bronze medalist(s)	8	4	2	14
4	Netherlands	1st place, gold medalist(s)		2nd place, silver medalist(s)		2nd place, silver medalist(s)		2nd place, silver medalist(s)		1st place, gold medalist(s)	1st place, gold medalist(s)	3rd place, bronze medalist(s)		1st place, gold medalist(s)		3rd place, bronze medalist(s)	3rd place, bronze medalist(s)	1st place, gold medalist(s)	2nd place, silver medalist(s)	1st place, gold medalist(s)	1st place, gold medalist(s)	7	4	3	14
5	Italy	2nd place, silver medalist(s)	1st place, gold medalist(s)	1st place, gold medalist(s)	1st place, gold medalist(s)	1st place, gold medalist(s)	1st place, gold medalist(s)	1st place, gold medalist(s)	1st place, gold medalist(s)	1st place, gold medalist(s)	1st place, gold medalist(s)	2nd place, silver medalist(s)				3rd place, bronze medalist(s)						9	2	1	12
6	Cuba	3rd place, bronze medalist(s)	1st place, gold medalist(s)	2nd place, silver medalist(s)	1st place, gold medalist(s)	1st place, gold medalist(s)	1st place, gold medalist(s)	1st place, gold medalist(s)	1st place, gold medalist(s)	1st place, gold medalist(s)	1st place, gold medalist(s)											8	1	1	10
7	Germany			3rd place, bronze medalist(s)							3rd place, bronze medalist(s)	1st place, gold medalist(s)	1st place, gold medalist(s)	1st place, gold medalist(s)	1st place, gold medalist(s)	2nd place, silver medalist(s)	1st place, gold medalist(s)	3rd place, bronze medalist(s)		2nd place, silver medalist(s)		5	2	3	10
8	Japan	1st place, gold medalist(s)	1st place, gold medalist(s)	3rd place, bronze medalist(s)	1st place, gold medalist(s)	2nd place, silver medalist(s)	1st place, gold medalist(s)	3rd place, bronze medalist(s)	3rd place, bronze medalist(s)	2nd place, silver medalist(s)	2nd place, silver medalist(s)											4	3	3	10
9	China		1st place, gold medalist(s)		1st place, gold medalist(s)		1st place, gold medalist(s)		1st place, gold medalist(s)		1st place, gold medalist(s)		2nd place, silver medalist(s)		1st place, gold medalist(s)				1st place, gold medalist(s)		1st place, gold medalist(s)	8	1	0	9
10	Poland	1st place, gold medalist(s)	3rd place, bronze medalist(s)	1st place, gold medalist(s)	2nd place, silver medalist(s)	2nd place, silver medalist(s)				1st place, gold medalist(s)	3rd place, bronze medalist(s)					2nd place, silver medalist(s)						3	3	2	8
11	Soviet Union^{*}	1st place, gold medalist(s)	1st place, gold medalist(s)	1st place, gold medalist(s)	1st place, gold medalist(s)	1st place, gold medalist(s)	1st place, gold medalist(s)			3rd place, bronze medalist(s)												6	0	1	7
12	Canada									3rd place, bronze medalist(s)		3rd place, bronze medalist(s)	2nd place, silver medalist(s)		1st place, gold medalist(s)		2nd place, silver medalist(s)		3rd place, bronze medalist(s)		2nd place, silver medalist(s)	1	3	3	7
13	Serbia		2nd place, silver medalist(s)	3rd place, bronze medalist(s)	1st place, gold medalist(s)		2nd place, silver medalist(s)			1st place, gold medalist(s)	3rd place, bronze medalist(s)											2	2	2	6
14	Serbia and Montenegro^{*}	1st place, gold medalist(s)		2nd place, silver medalist(s)	3rd place, bronze medalist(s)	3rd place, bronze medalist(s)		3rd place, bronze medalist(s)		2nd place, silver medalist(s)												1	2	3	6
15	Norway											1st place, gold medalist(s)		1st place, gold medalist(s)		1st place, gold medalist(s)		2nd place, silver medalist(s)		2nd place, silver medalist(s)		3	2	0	5
16	Sweden											1st place, gold medalist(s)		1st place, gold medalist(s)		1st place, gold medalist(s)		2nd place, silver medalist(s)				3	1	0	4
17	East Germany^{*}	2nd place, silver medalist(s)	2nd place, silver medalist(s)	1st place, gold medalist(s)		1st place, gold medalist(s)																2	2	0	4
18	France	1st place, gold medalist(s)		3rd place, bronze medalist(s)						1st place, gold medalist(s)				3rd place, bronze medalist(s)								2	0	2	4
19	Czech Republic													1st place, gold medalist(s)	3rd place, bronze medalist(s)	2nd place, silver medalist(s)	2nd place, silver medalist(s)					1	2	1	4
20	Czechoslovakia^{*}	2nd place, silver medalist(s)		1st place, gold medalist(s)	3rd place, bronze medalist(s)	3rd place, bronze medalist(s)																1	1	2	4
20	Latvia											3rd place, bronze medalist(s)			1st place, gold medalist(s)		3rd place, bronze medalist(s)				2nd place, silver medalist(s)	1	1	2	4
22	Australia												1st place, gold medalist(s)	3rd place, bronze medalist(s)	3rd place, bronze medalist(s)		3rd place, bronze medalist(s)					1	0	3	4
23	Bulgaria	2nd place, silver medalist(s)	3rd place, bronze medalist(s)	2nd place, silver medalist(s)		3rd place, bronze medalist(s)																0	2	2	4
23	Switzerland											3rd place, bronze medalist(s)	3rd place, bronze medalist(s)	2nd place, silver medalist(s)			2nd place, silver medalist(s)					0	2	2	4
25	South Korea		3rd place, bronze medalist(s)		3rd place, bronze medalist(s)		3rd place, bronze medalist(s)				3rd place, bronze medalist(s)											0	0	4	4
26	Iran							3rd place, bronze medalist(s)										1st place, gold medalist(s)		1st place, gold medalist(s)		2	0	1	3
27	Argentina	3rd place, bronze medalist(s)		3rd place, bronze medalist(s)										1st place, gold medalist(s)								1	0	2	3
28	Finland																	3rd place, bronze medalist(s)		2nd place, silver medalist(s)	2nd place, silver medalist(s)	0	2	1	3
28	Romania	3rd place, bronze medalist(s)		2nd place, silver medalist(s)	2nd place, silver medalist(s)																	0	2	1	3
30	Bosnia and Herzegovina																	1st place, gold medalist(s)		1st place, gold medalist(s)		2	0	0	2
31	Turkey				2nd place, silver medalist(s)						1st place, gold medalist(s)											1	1	0	2
32	Peru		2nd place, silver medalist(s)		2nd place, silver medalist(s)																	0	2	0	2
32	(Russia) ROC^{*}	2nd place, silver medalist(s)										2nd place, silver medalist(s)										0	2	0	2
32	West Germany^{*}																	2nd place, silver medalist(s)		2nd place, silver medalist(s)		0	2	0	2
35	Slovenia									3rd place, bronze medalist(s)											2nd place, silver medalist(s)	0	1	1	2
35	Yugoslavia^{*}																	3rd place, bronze medalist(s)		2nd place, silver medalist(s)		0	1	1	2
37	Egypt																	3rd place, bronze medalist(s)		3rd place, bronze medalist(s)		0	0	2	2
37	North Korea		3rd place, bronze medalist(s)		3rd place, bronze medalist(s)																	0	0	2	2
37	Qatar											3rd place, bronze medalist(s)				3rd place, bronze medalist(s)						0	0	2	2
37	Ukraine																		3rd place, bronze medalist(s)		3rd place, bronze medalist(s)	0	0	2	2
41	Austria													2nd place, silver medalist(s)								0	1	0	1
41	Hungary																			2nd place, silver medalist(s)		0	1	0	1
41	RPC^{*}																	2nd place, silver medalist(s)				0	1	0	1
41	Spain											2nd place, silver medalist(s)										0	1	0	1
41	Unified Team^{*}		2nd place, silver medalist(s)																			0	1	0	1
46	Dominican Republic								3rd place, bronze medalist(s)													0	0	1	1
46	Kazakhstan																			3rd place, bronze medalist(s)		0	0	1	1
46	Lithuania																				3rd place, bronze medalist(s)	0	0	1	1

^{*}Defunct National Olympic Committees (NOCs) and National Paralympic Committees (NPCs) or historical teams are shown in italic.

==== Men ====
Last updated after the 2026 FIVB Men's Volleyball Nations League (As of 2 August 2026)
		Indoor volleyball					Beach volleyball			Sitting volleyball		Number of			
		Olympic Games	World Champion- ship	World Cup	World Grand Champions Cup	Nations League / World League	Olympic Games	World Champion- ships	World Tour Finals	Paralympic Games	World Champion- ship	Number of			
Rk.	Nation	Men	Men	Men	Men	Men	Men	Men	Men	Men	Men	1st place, gold medalist(s)	2nd place, silver medalist(s)	3rd place, bronze medalist(s)	Total
1	Netherlands	1st place, gold medalist(s)	2nd place, silver medalist(s)	2nd place, silver medalist(s)	2nd place, silver medalist(s)	1st place, gold medalist(s)	3rd place, bronze medalist(s)	1st place, gold medalist(s)	3rd place, bronze medalist(s)	1st place, gold medalist(s)	1st place, gold medalist(s)	5	3	2	10
2	Brazil	1st place, gold medalist(s)	1st place, gold medalist(s)	1st place, gold medalist(s)	1st place, gold medalist(s)	1st place, gold medalist(s)	1st place, gold medalist(s)	1st place, gold medalist(s)	1st place, gold medalist(s)		2nd place, silver medalist(s)	8	1	0	9
3	United States	1st place, gold medalist(s)	1st place, gold medalist(s)	1st place, gold medalist(s)	2nd place, silver medalist(s)	1st place, gold medalist(s)	1st place, gold medalist(s)	1st place, gold medalist(s)	1st place, gold medalist(s)			7	1	0	8
4	Russia	1st place, gold medalist(s)	2nd place, silver medalist(s)	1st place, gold medalist(s)	2nd place, silver medalist(s)	1st place, gold medalist(s)		1st place, gold medalist(s)	1st place, gold medalist(s)	3rd place, bronze medalist(s)		5	2	1	8
5	Italy	2nd place, silver medalist(s)	1st place, gold medalist(s)	1st place, gold medalist(s)	1st place, gold medalist(s)	1st place, gold medalist(s)	2nd place, silver medalist(s)		3rd place, bronze medalist(s)			4	2	1	7
6	Poland	1st place, gold medalist(s)	1st place, gold medalist(s)	2nd place, silver medalist(s)		1st place, gold medalist(s)		3rd place, bronze medalist(s)	2nd place, silver medalist(s)			3	2	1	6
7	Germany		3rd place, bronze medalist(s)				1st place, gold medalist(s)	1st place, gold medalist(s)	2nd place, silver medalist(s)	3rd place, bronze medalist(s)	2nd place, silver medalist(s)	2	2	2	6
8	Norway						1st place, gold medalist(s)	1st place, gold medalist(s)	1st place, gold medalist(s)	2nd place, silver medalist(s)	2nd place, silver medalist(s)	3	2	0	5
9	Cuba	3rd place, bronze medalist(s)	2nd place, silver medalist(s)	1st place, gold medalist(s)	1st place, gold medalist(s)	1st place, gold medalist(s)						3	1	1	5
10	Japan	1st place, gold medalist(s)	3rd place, bronze medalist(s)	2nd place, silver medalist(s)	3rd place, bronze medalist(s)	2nd place, silver medalist(s)						1	2	2	5
10	Serbia and Montenegro^{*}	1st place, gold medalist(s)	2nd place, silver medalist(s)	3rd place, bronze medalist(s)	3rd place, bronze medalist(s)	2nd place, silver medalist(s)						1	2	2	5
12	Sweden						1st place, gold medalist(s)	1st place, gold medalist(s)	1st place, gold medalist(s)	2nd place, silver medalist(s)		3	1	0	4
13	Soviet Union^{*}	1st place, gold medalist(s)	1st place, gold medalist(s)	1st place, gold medalist(s)		3rd place, bronze medalist(s)						3	0	1	4
14	France	1st place, gold medalist(s)	3rd place, bronze medalist(s)			1st place, gold medalist(s)		3rd place, bronze medalist(s)				2	0	2	4
15	East Germany^{*}	2nd place, silver medalist(s)	1st place, gold medalist(s)	1st place, gold medalist(s)								2	1	0	3
16	Iran				3rd place, bronze medalist(s)					1st place, gold medalist(s)	1st place, gold medalist(s)	2	0	1	3
17	Czechoslovakia^{*}	2nd place, silver medalist(s)	1st place, gold medalist(s)	3rd place, bronze medalist(s)								1	1	1	3
18	Argentina	3rd place, bronze medalist(s)	3rd place, bronze medalist(s)					1st place, gold medalist(s)				1	0	2	3
19	Bulgaria	2nd place, silver medalist(s)	2nd place, silver medalist(s)	3rd place, bronze medalist(s)								0	2	1	3
20	Bosnia and Herzegovina									1st place, gold medalist(s)	1st place, gold medalist(s)	2	0	0	2
21	Serbia		3rd place, bronze medalist(s)			1st place, gold medalist(s)						1	0	1	2
22	(Russia) ROC^{*}	2nd place, silver medalist(s)					2nd place, silver medalist(s)					0	2	0	2
22	West Germany^{*}									2nd place, silver medalist(s)	2nd place, silver medalist(s)	0	2	0	2
24	Finland									3rd place, bronze medalist(s)	2nd place, silver medalist(s)	0	1	1	2
24	Romania	3rd place, bronze medalist(s)	2nd place, silver medalist(s)									0	1	1	2
24	Switzerland						3rd place, bronze medalist(s)	2nd place, silver medalist(s)				0	1	1	2
24	Yugoslavia^{*}									3rd place, bronze medalist(s)	2nd place, silver medalist(s)	0	1	1	2
28	Canada					3rd place, bronze medalist(s)	3rd place, bronze medalist(s)					0	0	2	2
28	Egypt									3rd place, bronze medalist(s)	3rd place, bronze medalist(s)	0	0	2	2
28	Qatar						3rd place, bronze medalist(s)		3rd place, bronze medalist(s)			0	0	2	2
31	Austria							2nd place, silver medalist(s)				0	1	0	1
31	Hungary										2nd place, silver medalist(s)	0	1	0	1
31	RPC^{*}									2nd place, silver medalist(s)		0	1	0	1
31	Spain						2nd place, silver medalist(s)					0	1	0	1
35	Australia							3rd place, bronze medalist(s)				0	0	1	1
35	Kazakhstan										3rd place, bronze medalist(s)	0	0	1	1
35	Latvia						3rd place, bronze medalist(s)					0	0	1	1
35	Slovenia					3rd place, bronze medalist(s)						0	0	1	1

^{*}Defunct National Olympic Committees (NOCs) and National Paralympic Committees (NPCs) or historical teams are shown in italic.

==== Women ====
Last updated after the 2026 FIVB Women's Volleyball Nations League (As of 26 July 2026)
		Indoor volleyball					Beach volleyball			Sitting volleyball		Number of			
		Olympic Games	World Champion- ship	World Cup	World Grand Champions Cup	Nations League / Grand Prix	Olympic Games	World Champion- ships	World Tour Finals	Paralympic Games	World Champion- ship	Number of			
Rk.	Nation	Women	Women	Women	Women	Women	Women	Women	Women	Women	Women	1st place, gold medalist(s)	2nd place, silver medalist(s)	3rd place, bronze medalist(s)	Total
1	United States	1st place, gold medalist(s)	1st place, gold medalist(s)	2nd place, silver medalist(s)	2nd place, silver medalist(s)	1st place, gold medalist(s)	1st place, gold medalist(s)	1st place, gold medalist(s)	1st place, gold medalist(s)	1st place, gold medalist(s)	1st place, gold medalist(s)	8	2	0	10
2	China	1st place, gold medalist(s)	1st place, gold medalist(s)	1st place, gold medalist(s)	1st place, gold medalist(s)	1st place, gold medalist(s)	2nd place, silver medalist(s)	1st place, gold medalist(s)		1st place, gold medalist(s)	1st place, gold medalist(s)	8	1	0	9
3	Brazil	1st place, gold medalist(s)	2nd place, silver medalist(s)	2nd place, silver medalist(s)	1st place, gold medalist(s)	1st place, gold medalist(s)	1st place, gold medalist(s)	1st place, gold medalist(s)	1st place, gold medalist(s)	3rd place, bronze medalist(s)		6	2	1	9
4	Russia	2nd place, silver medalist(s)	1st place, gold medalist(s)	2nd place, silver medalist(s)	1st place, gold medalist(s)	1st place, gold medalist(s)					3rd place, bronze medalist(s)	3	2	1	6
5	Cuba	1st place, gold medalist(s)	1st place, gold medalist(s)	1st place, gold medalist(s)	1st place, gold medalist(s)	1st place, gold medalist(s)						5	0	0	5
5	Italy	1st place, gold medalist(s)	1st place, gold medalist(s)	1st place, gold medalist(s)	1st place, gold medalist(s)	1st place, gold medalist(s)						5	0	0	5
7	Japan	1st place, gold medalist(s)	1st place, gold medalist(s)	1st place, gold medalist(s)	3rd place, bronze medalist(s)	2nd place, silver medalist(s)						3	1	1	5
8	Canada						2nd place, silver medalist(s)	1st place, gold medalist(s)	2nd place, silver medalist(s)	3rd place, bronze medalist(s)	2nd place, silver medalist(s)	1	3	1	5
9	Germany					3rd place, bronze medalist(s)	1st place, gold medalist(s)	1st place, gold medalist(s)	1st place, gold medalist(s)			3	0	1	4
10	Netherlands					1st place, gold medalist(s)			3rd place, bronze medalist(s)	2nd place, silver medalist(s)	1st place, gold medalist(s)	2	1	1	4
11	Serbia	2nd place, silver medalist(s)	1st place, gold medalist(s)	2nd place, silver medalist(s)		3rd place, bronze medalist(s)						1	2	1	4
12	South Korea	3rd place, bronze medalist(s)	3rd place, bronze medalist(s)	3rd place, bronze medalist(s)		3rd place, bronze medalist(s)						0	0	4	4
13	Soviet Union^{*}	1st place, gold medalist(s)	1st place, gold medalist(s)	1st place, gold medalist(s)								3	0	0	3
14	Latvia							1st place, gold medalist(s)	3rd place, bronze medalist(s)		2nd place, silver medalist(s)	1	1	1	3
15	Australia						1st place, gold medalist(s)	3rd place, bronze medalist(s)	3rd place, bronze medalist(s)			1	0	2	3
16	Poland	3rd place, bronze medalist(s)	2nd place, silver medalist(s)			3rd place, bronze medalist(s)						0	1	2	3
17	Turkey		2nd place, silver medalist(s)			1st place, gold medalist(s)						1	1	0	2
18	Peru	2nd place, silver medalist(s)	2nd place, silver medalist(s)									0	2	0	2
19	Czech Republic							3rd place, bronze medalist(s)	2nd place, silver medalist(s)			0	1	1	2
19	Switzerland						3rd place, bronze medalist(s)		2nd place, silver medalist(s)			0	1	1	2
21	North Korea	3rd place, bronze medalist(s)	3rd place, bronze medalist(s)									0	0	2	2
21	Ukraine									3rd place, bronze medalist(s)	3rd place, bronze medalist(s)	0	0	2	2
23	East Germany^{*}	2nd place, silver medalist(s)										0	1	0	1
23	Finland										2nd place, silver medalist(s)	0	1	0	1
23	Romania		2nd place, silver medalist(s)									0	1	0	1
23	Slovenia										2nd place, silver medalist(s)	0	1	0	1
23	Unified Team^{*}	2nd place, silver medalist(s)										0	1	0	1
28	Bulgaria	3rd place, bronze medalist(s)										0	0	1	1
28	Czechoslovakia^{*}		3rd place, bronze medalist(s)									0	0	1	1
28	Dominican Republic				3rd place, bronze medalist(s)							0	0	1	1
28	Lithuania										3rd place, bronze medalist(s)	0	0	1	1
28	Serbia and Montenegro^{*}		3rd place, bronze medalist(s)									0	0	1	1

^{*}Defunct National Olympic Committees (NOCs) or historical teams are shown in italic.

=== Indoor volleyball and beach volleyball ===
==== Men and women ====
Last updated after the 2026 FIVB Men's Volleyball Nations League (As of 2 August 2026)
		Indoor volleyball										Beach volleyball						Number of			
		Olympic Games		World Champion- ship		World Cup		World Grand Champions Cup		Nations League / World League	Nations League / Grand Prix	Olympic Games		World Champion- ships		World Tour Finals		Number of			
Rk.	Nation	M	W	M	W	M	W	M	W	M	W	M	W	M	W	M	W	1st place, gold medalist(s)	2nd place, silver medalist(s)	3rd place, bronze medalist(s)	Total
1	Brazil	1st place, gold medalist(s)	1st place, gold medalist(s)	1st place, gold medalist(s)	2nd place, silver medalist(s)	1st place, gold medalist(s)	2nd place, silver medalist(s)	1st place, gold medalist(s)	1st place, gold medalist(s)	1st place, gold medalist(s)	1st place, gold medalist(s)	1st place, gold medalist(s)	1st place, gold medalist(s)	1st place, gold medalist(s)	1st place, gold medalist(s)	1st place, gold medalist(s)	1st place, gold medalist(s)	14	2	0	16
2	United States	1st place, gold medalist(s)	1st place, gold medalist(s)	1st place, gold medalist(s)	1st place, gold medalist(s)	1st place, gold medalist(s)	2nd place, silver medalist(s)	2nd place, silver medalist(s)	2nd place, silver medalist(s)	1st place, gold medalist(s)	1st place, gold medalist(s)	1st place, gold medalist(s)	1st place, gold medalist(s)	1st place, gold medalist(s)	1st place, gold medalist(s)	1st place, gold medalist(s)	1st place, gold medalist(s)	13	3	0	16
3	Italy	2nd place, silver medalist(s)	1st place, gold medalist(s)	1st place, gold medalist(s)	1st place, gold medalist(s)	1st place, gold medalist(s)	1st place, gold medalist(s)	1st place, gold medalist(s)	1st place, gold medalist(s)	1st place, gold medalist(s)	1st place, gold medalist(s)	2nd place, silver medalist(s)				3rd place, bronze medalist(s)		9	2	1	12
4	Russia	1st place, gold medalist(s)	2nd place, silver medalist(s)	2nd place, silver medalist(s)	1st place, gold medalist(s)	1st place, gold medalist(s)	2nd place, silver medalist(s)	2nd place, silver medalist(s)	1st place, gold medalist(s)	1st place, gold medalist(s)	1st place, gold medalist(s)			1st place, gold medalist(s)		1st place, gold medalist(s)		8	4	0	12
5	Cuba	3rd place, bronze medalist(s)	1st place, gold medalist(s)	2nd place, silver medalist(s)	1st place, gold medalist(s)	1st place, gold medalist(s)	1st place, gold medalist(s)	1st place, gold medalist(s)	1st place, gold medalist(s)	1st place, gold medalist(s)	1st place, gold medalist(s)							8	1	1	10
6	Netherlands	1st place, gold medalist(s)		2nd place, silver medalist(s)		2nd place, silver medalist(s)		2nd place, silver medalist(s)		1st place, gold medalist(s)	1st place, gold medalist(s)	3rd place, bronze medalist(s)		1st place, gold medalist(s)		3rd place, bronze medalist(s)	3rd place, bronze medalist(s)	4	3	3	10
6	Japan	1st place, gold medalist(s)	1st place, gold medalist(s)	3rd place, bronze medalist(s)	1st place, gold medalist(s)	2nd place, silver medalist(s)	1st place, gold medalist(s)	3rd place, bronze medalist(s)	3rd place, bronze medalist(s)	2nd place, silver medalist(s)	2nd place, silver medalist(s)							4	3	3	10
8	Poland	1st place, gold medalist(s)	3rd place, bronze medalist(s)	1st place, gold medalist(s)	2nd place, silver medalist(s)	2nd place, silver medalist(s)				1st place, gold medalist(s)	3rd place, bronze medalist(s)			3rd place, bronze medalist(s)		2nd place, silver medalist(s)		3	3	3	9
9	Germany			3rd place, bronze medalist(s)							3rd place, bronze medalist(s)	1st place, gold medalist(s)	1st place, gold medalist(s)	1st place, gold medalist(s)	1st place, gold medalist(s)	2nd place, silver medalist(s)	1st place, gold medalist(s)	5	1	2	8
10	China		1st place, gold medalist(s)		1st place, gold medalist(s)		1st place, gold medalist(s)		1st place, gold medalist(s)		1st place, gold medalist(s)		2nd place, silver medalist(s)		1st place, gold medalist(s)			6	1	0	7
11	Soviet Union^{*}	1st place, gold medalist(s)	1st place, gold medalist(s)	1st place, gold medalist(s)	1st place, gold medalist(s)	1st place, gold medalist(s)	1st place, gold medalist(s)			3rd place, bronze medalist(s)								6	0	1	7
12	Serbia		2nd place, silver medalist(s)	3rd place, bronze medalist(s)	1st place, gold medalist(s)		2nd place, silver medalist(s)			1st place, gold medalist(s)	3rd place, bronze medalist(s)							2	2	2	6
13	Serbia and Montenegro^{*}	1st place, gold medalist(s)		2nd place, silver medalist(s)	3rd place, bronze medalist(s)	3rd place, bronze medalist(s)		3rd place, bronze medalist(s)		2nd place, silver medalist(s)								1	2	3	6
14	Canada									3rd place, bronze medalist(s)		3rd place, bronze medalist(s)	2nd place, silver medalist(s)		1st place, gold medalist(s)		2nd place, silver medalist(s)	1	2	2	5
15	East Germany^{*}	2nd place, silver medalist(s)	2nd place, silver medalist(s)	1st place, gold medalist(s)		1st place, gold medalist(s)												2	2	0	4
16	France	1st place, gold medalist(s)		3rd place, bronze medalist(s)						1st place, gold medalist(s)				3rd place, bronze medalist(s)				2	0	2	4
17	Czech Republic													1st place, gold medalist(s)	3rd place, bronze medalist(s)	2nd place, silver medalist(s)	2nd place, silver medalist(s)	1	2	1	4
18	Czechoslovakia^{*}	2nd place, silver medalist(s)		1st place, gold medalist(s)	3rd place, bronze medalist(s)	3rd place, bronze medalist(s)												1	1	2	4
19	Australia												1st place, gold medalist(s)	3rd place, bronze medalist(s)	3rd place, bronze medalist(s)		3rd place, bronze medalist(s)	1	0	3	4
20	Bulgaria	2nd place, silver medalist(s)	3rd place, bronze medalist(s)	2nd place, silver medalist(s)		3rd place, bronze medalist(s)												0	2	2	4
20	Switzerland											3rd place, bronze medalist(s)	3rd place, bronze medalist(s)	2nd place, silver medalist(s)			2nd place, silver medalist(s)	0	2	2	4
22	South Korea		3rd place, bronze medalist(s)		3rd place, bronze medalist(s)		3rd place, bronze medalist(s)				3rd place, bronze medalist(s)							0	0	4	4
23	Norway											1st place, gold medalist(s)		1st place, gold medalist(s)		1st place, gold medalist(s)		3	0	0	3
23	Sweden											1st place, gold medalist(s)		1st place, gold medalist(s)		1st place, gold medalist(s)		3	0	0	3
25	Turkey				2nd place, silver medalist(s)						1st place, gold medalist(s)							1	1	0	2
26	Argentina	3rd place, bronze medalist(s)		3rd place, bronze medalist(s)										1st place, gold medalist(s)				1	0	2	3
26	Latvia											3rd place, bronze medalist(s)			1st place, gold medalist(s)		3rd place, bronze medalist(s)	1	0	2	3
28	Romania	3rd place, bronze medalist(s)		2nd place, silver medalist(s)	2nd place, silver medalist(s)													0	2	1	3
29	Peru		2nd place, silver medalist(s)		2nd place, silver medalist(s)													0	2	0	2
29	ROC^{*}	2nd place, silver medalist(s)										2nd place, silver medalist(s)						0	2	0	2
31	North Korea		3rd place, bronze medalist(s)		3rd place, bronze medalist(s)													0	0	2	2
31	Qatar											3rd place, bronze medalist(s)				3rd place, bronze medalist(s)		0	0	2	2
33	Austria													2nd place, silver medalist(s)				0	1	0	1
33	Spain											2nd place, silver medalist(s)						0	1	0	1
33	Unified Team^{*}		2nd place, silver medalist(s)															0	1	0	1
36	Dominican Republic								3rd place, bronze medalist(s)									0	0	1	1
36	Iran							3rd place, bronze medalist(s)										0	0	1	1
36	Slovenia									3rd place, bronze medalist(s)								0	0	1	1

^{*}Defunct National Olympic Committees (NOCs) or historical teams are shown in italic.

==== Men ====
Last updated after the 2026 FIVB Men's Volleyball Nations League (As of 2 August 2026)
		Indoor volleyball					Beach volleyball			Number of			
		Olympic Games	World Champion- ship	World Cup	World Grand Champions Cup	Nations League / World League	Olympic Games	World Champion- ships	World Tour Finals	Number of			
Rk.	Nation	Men	Men	Men	Men	Men	Men	Men	Men	1st place, gold medalist(s)	2nd place, silver medalist(s)	3rd place, bronze medalist(s)	Total
1	Brazil	1st place, gold medalist(s)	1st place, gold medalist(s)	1st place, gold medalist(s)	1st place, gold medalist(s)	1st place, gold medalist(s)	1st place, gold medalist(s)	1st place, gold medalist(s)	1st place, gold medalist(s)	8	0	0	8
2	United States	1st place, gold medalist(s)	1st place, gold medalist(s)	1st place, gold medalist(s)	2nd place, silver medalist(s)	1st place, gold medalist(s)	1st place, gold medalist(s)	1st place, gold medalist(s)	1st place, gold medalist(s)	7	1	0	8
3	Netherlands	1st place, gold medalist(s)	2nd place, silver medalist(s)	2nd place, silver medalist(s)	2nd place, silver medalist(s)	1st place, gold medalist(s)	3rd place, bronze medalist(s)	1st place, gold medalist(s)	3rd place, bronze medalist(s)	3	3	2	8
4	Russia	1st place, gold medalist(s)	2nd place, silver medalist(s)	1st place, gold medalist(s)	2nd place, silver medalist(s)	1st place, gold medalist(s)		1st place, gold medalist(s)	1st place, gold medalist(s)	5	2	0	7
5	Italy	2nd place, silver medalist(s)	1st place, gold medalist(s)	1st place, gold medalist(s)	1st place, gold medalist(s)	1st place, gold medalist(s)	2nd place, silver medalist(s)		3rd place, bronze medalist(s)	4	2	1	7
6	Poland	1st place, gold medalist(s)	1st place, gold medalist(s)	2nd place, silver medalist(s)		1st place, gold medalist(s)		3rd place, bronze medalist(s)	2nd place, silver medalist(s)	3	2	1	6
7	Cuba	3rd place, bronze medalist(s)	2nd place, silver medalist(s)	1st place, gold medalist(s)	1st place, gold medalist(s)	1st place, gold medalist(s)				3	1	1	5
8	Japan	1st place, gold medalist(s)	3rd place, bronze medalist(s)	2nd place, silver medalist(s)	3rd place, bronze medalist(s)	2nd place, silver medalist(s)				1	2	2	5
8	Serbia and Montenegro^{*}	1st place, gold medalist(s)	2nd place, silver medalist(s)	3rd place, bronze medalist(s)	3rd place, bronze medalist(s)	2nd place, silver medalist(s)				1	2	2	5
10	Soviet Union^{*}	1st place, gold medalist(s)	1st place, gold medalist(s)	1st place, gold medalist(s)		3rd place, bronze medalist(s)				3	0	1	4
11	Germany		3rd place, bronze medalist(s)				1st place, gold medalist(s)	1st place, gold medalist(s)	2nd place, silver medalist(s)	2	1	1	4
12	France	1st place, gold medalist(s)	3rd place, bronze medalist(s)			1st place, gold medalist(s)		3rd place, bronze medalist(s)		2	0	2	4
13	Norway						1st place, gold medalist(s)	1st place, gold medalist(s)	1st place, gold medalist(s)	3	0	0	3
13	Sweden						1st place, gold medalist(s)	1st place, gold medalist(s)	1st place, gold medalist(s)	3	0	0	3
15	East Germany^{*}	2nd place, silver medalist(s)	1st place, gold medalist(s)	1st place, gold medalist(s)						2	1	0	3
16	Czechoslovakia^{*}	2nd place, silver medalist(s)	1st place, gold medalist(s)	3rd place, bronze medalist(s)						1	1	1	3
17	Argentina	3rd place, bronze medalist(s)	3rd place, bronze medalist(s)					1st place, gold medalist(s)		1	0	2	3
18	Bulgaria	2nd place, silver medalist(s)	2nd place, silver medalist(s)	3rd place, bronze medalist(s)						0	2	1	3
19	Serbia		3rd place, bronze medalist(s)			1st place, gold medalist(s)				1	0	1	2
20	Romania	3rd place, bronze medalist(s)	2nd place, silver medalist(s)							0	1	1	2
20	Switzerland						3rd place, bronze medalist(s)	2nd place, silver medalist(s)		0	1	1	2
22	ROC^{*}	2nd place, silver medalist(s)					2nd place, silver medalist(s)			0	2	0	2
23	Canada					3rd place, bronze medalist(s)	3rd place, bronze medalist(s)			0	0	2	2
23	Qatar						3rd place, bronze medalist(s)		3rd place, bronze medalist(s)	0	0	2	2
25	Austria							2nd place, silver medalist(s)		0	1	0	1
25	Spain						2nd place, silver medalist(s)			0	1	0	1
27	Australia							3rd place, bronze medalist(s)		0	0	1	1
27	Iran				3rd place, bronze medalist(s)					0	0	1	1
27	Latvia						3rd place, bronze medalist(s)			0	0	1	1
27	Slovenia					3rd place, bronze medalist(s)				0	0	1	1

^{*}Defunct National Olympic Committees (NOCs) or historical teams are shown in italic.

==== Women ====
Last updated after the 2026 FIVB Women's Volleyball Nations League (As of 26 July 2026)
		Indoor volleyball					Beach volleyball			Number of			
		Olympic Games	World Champion- ship	World Cup	World Grand Champions Cup	Nations League / Grand Prix	Olympic Games	World Champion- ships	World Tour Finals	Number of			
Rk.	Nation	Women	Women	Women	Women	Women	Women	Women	Women	1st place, gold medalist(s)	2nd place, silver medalist(s)	3rd place, bronze medalist(s)	Total
1	Brazil	1st place, gold medalist(s)	2nd place, silver medalist(s)	2nd place, silver medalist(s)	1st place, gold medalist(s)	1st place, gold medalist(s)	1st place, gold medalist(s)	1st place, gold medalist(s)	1st place, gold medalist(s)	6	2	0	8
1	United States	1st place, gold medalist(s)	1st place, gold medalist(s)	2nd place, silver medalist(s)	2nd place, silver medalist(s)	1st place, gold medalist(s)	1st place, gold medalist(s)	1st place, gold medalist(s)	1st place, gold medalist(s)	6	2	0	8
3	China	1st place, gold medalist(s)	1st place, gold medalist(s)	1st place, gold medalist(s)	1st place, gold medalist(s)	1st place, gold medalist(s)	2nd place, silver medalist(s)	1st place, gold medalist(s)		6	1	0	7
4	Cuba	1st place, gold medalist(s)	1st place, gold medalist(s)	1st place, gold medalist(s)	1st place, gold medalist(s)	1st place, gold medalist(s)				5	0	0	5
4	Italy	1st place, gold medalist(s)	1st place, gold medalist(s)	1st place, gold medalist(s)	1st place, gold medalist(s)	1st place, gold medalist(s)				5	0	0	5
6	Russia	2nd place, silver medalist(s)	1st place, gold medalist(s)	2nd place, silver medalist(s)	1st place, gold medalist(s)	1st place, gold medalist(s)				3	2	0	5
7	Japan	1st place, gold medalist(s)	1st place, gold medalist(s)	1st place, gold medalist(s)	3rd place, bronze medalist(s)	2nd place, silver medalist(s)				3	1	1	5
8	Germany					3rd place, bronze medalist(s)	1st place, gold medalist(s)	1st place, gold medalist(s)	1st place, gold medalist(s)	3	0	1	4
9	Serbia	2nd place, silver medalist(s)	1st place, gold medalist(s)	2nd place, silver medalist(s)		3rd place, bronze medalist(s)				1	2	1	4
10	South Korea	3rd place, bronze medalist(s)	3rd place, bronze medalist(s)	3rd place, bronze medalist(s)		3rd place, bronze medalist(s)				0	0	4	4
11	Soviet Union^{*}	1st place, gold medalist(s)	1st place, gold medalist(s)	1st place, gold medalist(s)						3	0	0	3
12	Canada						2nd place, silver medalist(s)	1st place, gold medalist(s)	2nd place, silver medalist(s)	1	2	0	3
13	Australia						1st place, gold medalist(s)	3rd place, bronze medalist(s)	3rd place, bronze medalist(s)	1	0	2	3
14	Poland	3rd place, bronze medalist(s)	2nd place, silver medalist(s)			3rd place, bronze medalist(s)				0	1	2	3
15	Turkey		2nd place, silver medalist(s)			1st place, gold medalist(s)				1	1	0	2
16	Latvia							1st place, gold medalist(s)	3rd place, bronze medalist(s)	1	0	1	2
17	Netherlands					1st place, gold medalist(s)			3rd place, bronze medalist(s)	1	0	1	2
18	Peru	2nd place, silver medalist(s)	2nd place, silver medalist(s)							0	2	0	2
19	Czech Republic							3rd place, bronze medalist(s)	2nd place, silver medalist(s)	0	1	1	2
19	Switzerland						3rd place, bronze medalist(s)		2nd place, silver medalist(s)	0	1	1	2
21	North Korea	3rd place, bronze medalist(s)	3rd place, bronze medalist(s)							0	0	2	2
22	East Germany^{*}	2nd place, silver medalist(s)								0	1	0	1
22	Romania		2nd place, silver medalist(s)							0	1	0	1
22	Unified Team^{*}	2nd place, silver medalist(s)								0	1	0	1
25	Bulgaria	3rd place, bronze medalist(s)								0	0	1	1
25	Czechoslovakia^{*}		3rd place, bronze medalist(s)							0	0	1	1
25	Dominican Republic				3rd place, bronze medalist(s)					0	0	1	1
25	Serbia and Montenegro^{*}		3rd place, bronze medalist(s)							0	0	1	1

^{*}Defunct National Olympic Committees (NOCs) or historical teams are shown in italic.

=== Indoor volleyball ===
==== Men and women ====
Last updated after the 2026 FIVB Men's Volleyball Nations League (As of 2 August 2026)
		Indoor volleyball										Number of			
		Olympic Games		World Champion- ship		World Cup		World Grand Champions Cup		Nations League / World League	Nations League / Grand Prix	Number of			
Rk.	Nation	Men	Women	Men	Women	Men	Women	Men	Women	Men	Women	1st place, gold medalist(s)	2nd place, silver medalist(s)	3rd place, bronze medalist(s)	Total
1	Italy	2nd place, silver medalist(s)	1st place, gold medalist(s)	1st place, gold medalist(s)	1st place, gold medalist(s)	1st place, gold medalist(s)	1st place, gold medalist(s)	1st place, gold medalist(s)	1st place, gold medalist(s)	1st place, gold medalist(s)	1st place, gold medalist(s)	9	1	0	10
2	Brazil	1st place, gold medalist(s)	1st place, gold medalist(s)	1st place, gold medalist(s)	2nd place, silver medalist(s)	1st place, gold medalist(s)	2nd place, silver medalist(s)	1st place, gold medalist(s)	1st place, gold medalist(s)	1st place, gold medalist(s)	1st place, gold medalist(s)	8	2	0	10
3	Cuba	3rd place, bronze medalist(s)	1st place, gold medalist(s)	2nd place, silver medalist(s)	1st place, gold medalist(s)	1st place, gold medalist(s)	1st place, gold medalist(s)	1st place, gold medalist(s)	1st place, gold medalist(s)	1st place, gold medalist(s)	1st place, gold medalist(s)	8	1	1	10
4	Russia	1st place, gold medalist(s)	2nd place, silver medalist(s)	2nd place, silver medalist(s)	1st place, gold medalist(s)	1st place, gold medalist(s)	2nd place, silver medalist(s)	2nd place, silver medalist(s)	1st place, gold medalist(s)	1st place, gold medalist(s)	1st place, gold medalist(s)	6	4	0	10
4	United States	1st place, gold medalist(s)	2nd place, silver medalist(s)	1st place, gold medalist(s)	1st place, gold medalist(s)	1st place, gold medalist(s)	2nd place, silver medalist(s)	2nd place, silver medalist(s)	2nd place, silver medalist(s)	1st place, gold medalist(s)	1st place, gold medalist(s)	6	4	0	10
6	Japan	1st place, gold medalist(s)	1st place, gold medalist(s)	3rd place, bronze medalist(s)	1st place, gold medalist(s)	2nd place, silver medalist(s)	1st place, gold medalist(s)	3rd place, bronze medalist(s)	3rd place, bronze medalist(s)	2nd place, silver medalist(s)	2nd place, silver medalist(s)	4	3	3	10
7	Soviet Union^{*}	1st place, gold medalist(s)	1st place, gold medalist(s)	1st place, gold medalist(s)	1st place, gold medalist(s)	1st place, gold medalist(s)	1st place, gold medalist(s)			3rd place, bronze medalist(s)		6	0	1	7
8	Poland	1st place, gold medalist(s)	3rd place, bronze medalist(s)	1st place, gold medalist(s)	2nd place, silver medalist(s)	2nd place, silver medalist(s)				1st place, gold medalist(s)	3rd place, bronze medalist(s)	3	2	2	7
9	Netherlands	1st place, gold medalist(s)		2nd place, silver medalist(s)		2nd place, silver medalist(s)		2nd place, silver medalist(s)		1st place, gold medalist(s)	1st place, gold medalist(s)	3	3	0	6
10	Serbia		2nd place, silver medalist(s)	3rd place, bronze medalist(s)	1st place, gold medalist(s)		2nd place, silver medalist(s)			1st place, gold medalist(s)	3rd place, bronze medalist(s)	2	2	2	6
11	Serbia and Montenegro^{*}	1st place, gold medalist(s)		2nd place, silver medalist(s)	3rd place, bronze medalist(s)	3rd place, bronze medalist(s)		3rd place, bronze medalist(s)		2nd place, silver medalist(s)		1	2	3	6
12	China		1st place, gold medalist(s)		1st place, gold medalist(s)		1st place, gold medalist(s)		1st place, gold medalist(s)		1st place, gold medalist(s)	5	0	0	5
13	East Germany^{*}	2nd place, silver medalist(s)	2nd place, silver medalist(s)	1st place, gold medalist(s)		1st place, gold medalist(s)						2	2	0	4
14	Czechoslovakia^{*}	2nd place, silver medalist(s)		1st place, gold medalist(s)	3rd place, bronze medalist(s)	3rd place, bronze medalist(s)						1	1	2	4
15	Bulgaria	2nd place, silver medalist(s)	3rd place, bronze medalist(s)	2nd place, silver medalist(s)		3rd place, bronze medalist(s)						0	2	2	4
16	South Korea		3rd place, bronze medalist(s)		3rd place, bronze medalist(s)		3rd place, bronze medalist(s)				3rd place, bronze medalist(s)	0	0	4	4
17	France	1st place, gold medalist(s)		3rd place, bronze medalist(s)						1st place, gold medalist(s)		2	0	1	3
18	Romania	3rd place, bronze medalist(s)		2nd place, silver medalist(s)	2nd place, silver medalist(s)							0	2	1	3
19	Turkey				2nd place, silver medalist(s)						1st place, gold medalist(s)	1	1	0	2
20	Peru		2nd place, silver medalist(s)		2nd place, silver medalist(s)							0	2	0	2
21	Argentina	3rd place, bronze medalist(s)		3rd place, bronze medalist(s)								0	0	2	2
21	Germany			3rd place, bronze medalist(s)							3rd place, bronze medalist(s)	0	0	2	2
21	North Korea		3rd place, bronze medalist(s)		3rd place, bronze medalist(s)							0	0	2	2
24	ROC^{*}	2nd place, silver medalist(s)										0	1	0	1
24	Unified Team^{*}		2nd place, silver medalist(s)									0	1	0	1
26	Canada									3rd place, bronze medalist(s)		0	0	1	1
26	Dominican Republic								3rd place, bronze medalist(s)			0	0	1	1
26	Iran							3rd place, bronze medalist(s)				0	0	1	1
26	Slovenia									3rd place, bronze medalist(s)		0	0	1	1

^{*}Defunct National Olympic Committees (NOCs) or historical teams are shown in italic.

==== Men ====
Last updated after the 2026 FIVB Men's Volleyball Nations League (As of 2 August 2026)
		Indoor volleyball					Number of			
		Olympic Games	World Champion- ship	World Cup	World Grand Champions Cup	Nations League / World League	Number of			
Rk.	Nation	Men	Men	Men	Men	Men	1st place, gold medalist(s)	2nd place, silver medalist(s)	3rd place, bronze medalist(s)	Total
1	Brazil	1st place, gold medalist(s)	1st place, gold medalist(s)	1st place, gold medalist(s)	1st place, gold medalist(s)	1st place, gold medalist(s)	5	0	0	5
2	Italy	2nd place, silver medalist(s)	1st place, gold medalist(s)	1st place, gold medalist(s)	1st place, gold medalist(s)	1st place, gold medalist(s)	4	1	0	5
2	United States	1st place, gold medalist(s)	1st place, gold medalist(s)	1st place, gold medalist(s)	2nd place, silver medalist(s)	1st place, gold medalist(s)	4	1	0	5
4	Russia	1st place, gold medalist(s)	2nd place, silver medalist(s)	1st place, gold medalist(s)	2nd place, silver medalist(s)	1st place, gold medalist(s)	3	2	0	5
5	Cuba	3rd place, bronze medalist(s)	2nd place, silver medalist(s)	1st place, gold medalist(s)	1st place, gold medalist(s)	1st place, gold medalist(s)	3	1	1	5
6	Netherlands	1st place, gold medalist(s)	2nd place, silver medalist(s)	2nd place, silver medalist(s)	2nd place, silver medalist(s)	1st place, gold medalist(s)	2	3	0	5
7	Japan	1st place, gold medalist(s)	3rd place, bronze medalist(s)	2nd place, silver medalist(s)	3rd place, bronze medalist(s)	2nd place, silver medalist(s)	1	2	2	5
7	Serbia and Montenegro^{*}	1st place, gold medalist(s)	2nd place, silver medalist(s)	3rd place, bronze medalist(s)	3rd place, bronze medalist(s)	2nd place, silver medalist(s)	1	2	2	5
9	Poland	1st place, gold medalist(s)	1st place, gold medalist(s)	2nd place, silver medalist(s)		1st place, gold medalist(s)	3	1	0	4
10	Soviet Union^{*}	1st place, gold medalist(s)	1st place, gold medalist(s)	1st place, gold medalist(s)		3rd place, bronze medalist(s)	3	0	1	4
11	East Germany^{*}	2nd place, silver medalist(s)	1st place, gold medalist(s)	1st place, gold medalist(s)			2	1	0	3
12	France	1st place, gold medalist(s)	3rd place, bronze medalist(s)			1st place, gold medalist(s)	2	0	1	3
13	Czechoslovakia^{*}	2nd place, silver medalist(s)	1st place, gold medalist(s)	3rd place, bronze medalist(s)			1	1	1	3
14	Bulgaria	2nd place, silver medalist(s)	2nd place, silver medalist(s)	3rd place, bronze medalist(s)			0	2	1	3
15	Serbia		3rd place, bronze medalist(s)			1st place, gold medalist(s)	1	0	1	2
16	Romania	3rd place, bronze medalist(s)	2nd place, silver medalist(s)				0	1	1	2
17	Argentina	3rd place, bronze medalist(s)	3rd place, bronze medalist(s)				0	0	2	2
18	ROC^{*}	2nd place, silver medalist(s)					0	1	0	1
19	Canada					3rd place, bronze medalist(s)	0	0	1	1
19	Germany		3rd place, bronze medalist(s)				0	0	1	1
19	Iran				3rd place, bronze medalist(s)		0	0	1	1
19	Slovenia					3rd place, bronze medalist(s)	0	0	1	1

^{*}Defunct National Olympic Committees (NOCs) or historical teams are shown in italic.

==== Women ====
Last updated after the 2026 FIVB Women's Volleyball Nations League (As of 26 July 2026)
		Indoor volleyball					Number of			
		Olympic Games	World Champion- ship	World Cup	World Grand Champions Cup	Nations League / Grand Prix	Number of			
Rk.	Nation	Women	Women	Women	Women	Women	1st place, gold medalist(s)	2nd place, silver medalist(s)	3rd place, bronze medalist(s)	Total
1	China	1st place, gold medalist(s)	1st place, gold medalist(s)	1st place, gold medalist(s)	1st place, gold medalist(s)	1st place, gold medalist(s)	5	0	0	5
1	Cuba	1st place, gold medalist(s)	1st place, gold medalist(s)	1st place, gold medalist(s)	1st place, gold medalist(s)	1st place, gold medalist(s)	5	0	0	5
1	Italy	1st place, gold medalist(s)	1st place, gold medalist(s)	1st place, gold medalist(s)	1st place, gold medalist(s)	1st place, gold medalist(s)	5	0	0	5
4	Brazil	1st place, gold medalist(s)	2nd place, silver medalist(s)	2nd place, silver medalist(s)	1st place, gold medalist(s)	1st place, gold medalist(s)	3	2	0	5
4	Russia	2nd place, silver medalist(s)	1st place, gold medalist(s)	2nd place, silver medalist(s)	1st place, gold medalist(s)	1st place, gold medalist(s)	3	2	0	5
4	United States	1st place, gold medalist(s)	1st place, gold medalist(s)	2nd place, silver medalist(s)	2nd place, silver medalist(s)	1st place, gold medalist(s)	3	2	0	5
7	Japan	1st place, gold medalist(s)	1st place, gold medalist(s)	1st place, gold medalist(s)	3rd place, bronze medalist(s)	2nd place, silver medalist(s)	3	1	1	5
8	Serbia	2nd place, silver medalist(s)	1st place, gold medalist(s)	2nd place, silver medalist(s)		3rd place, bronze medalist(s)	1	2	1	4
9	South Korea	3rd place, bronze medalist(s)	3rd place, bronze medalist(s)	3rd place, bronze medalist(s)		3rd place, bronze medalist(s)	0	0	4	4
10	Soviet Union^{*}	1st place, gold medalist(s)	1st place, gold medalist(s)	1st place, gold medalist(s)			3	0	0	3
11	Poland	3rd place, bronze medalist(s)	2nd place, silver medalist(s)			3rd place, bronze medalist(s)	0	1	2	3
12	Turkey		2nd place, silver medalist(s)			1st place, gold medalist(s)	1	1	0	2
13	Peru	2nd place, silver medalist(s)	2nd place, silver medalist(s)				0	2	0	2
14	North Korea	3rd place, bronze medalist(s)	3rd place, bronze medalist(s)				0	0	2	2
15	Netherlands					1st place, gold medalist(s)	1	0	0	1
16	East Germany^{*}	2nd place, silver medalist(s)					0	1	0	1
16	Romania		2nd place, silver medalist(s)				0	1	0	1
16	Unified Team^{*}	2nd place, silver medalist(s)					0	1	0	1
19	Bulgaria	3rd place, bronze medalist(s)					0	0	1	1
19	Czechoslovakia^{*}		3rd place, bronze medalist(s)				0	0	1	1
19	Dominican Republic				3rd place, bronze medalist(s)		0	0	1	1
19	Germany					3rd place, bronze medalist(s)	0	0	1	1
19	Serbia and Montenegro^{*}		3rd place, bronze medalist(s)				0	0	1	1

^{*}Defunct National Olympic Committees (NOCs) or historical teams are shown in italic.

=== Beach volleyball ===
==== Men and women ====
Last updated after the 2025 Beach Volleyball World Championships (As of 23 November 2025)
		Beach volleyball						Number of			
		Olympic Games		World Championships		World Tour Finals		Number of			
Rk.	Nation	Men	Women	Men	Women	Men	Women	1st place, gold medalist(s)	2nd place, silver medalist(s)	3rd place, bronze medalist(s)	Total
1	Brazil	1st place, gold medalist(s)	1st place, gold medalist(s)	1st place, gold medalist(s)	1st place, gold medalist(s)	1st place, gold medalist(s)	1st place, gold medalist(s)	6	0	0	6
1	United States	1st place, gold medalist(s)	1st place, gold medalist(s)	1st place, gold medalist(s)	1st place, gold medalist(s)	1st place, gold medalist(s)	1st place, gold medalist(s)	6	0	0	6
3	Germany	1st place, gold medalist(s)	1st place, gold medalist(s)	1st place, gold medalist(s)	1st place, gold medalist(s)	2nd place, silver medalist(s)	1st place, gold medalist(s)	5	1	0	6
4	Canada	3rd place, bronze medalist(s)	2nd place, silver medalist(s)		1st place, gold medalist(s)		2nd place, silver medalist(s)	1	2	1	4
4	Czech Republic			1st place, gold medalist(s)	3rd place, bronze medalist(s)	2nd place, silver medalist(s)	2nd place, silver medalist(s)	1	2	1	4
6	Australia		1st place, gold medalist(s)	3rd place, bronze medalist(s)	3rd place, bronze medalist(s)		3rd place, bronze medalist(s)	1	0	3	4
6	Netherlands	3rd place, bronze medalist(s)		1st place, gold medalist(s)		3rd place, bronze medalist(s)	3rd place, bronze medalist(s)	1	0	3	4
8	Switzerland	3rd place, bronze medalist(s)	3rd place, bronze medalist(s)	2nd place, silver medalist(s)			2nd place, silver medalist(s)	0	2	2	4
9	Norway	1st place, gold medalist(s)		1st place, gold medalist(s)		1st place, gold medalist(s)		3	0	0	3
9	Sweden	1st place, gold medalist(s)		1st place, gold medalist(s)		1st place, gold medalist(s)		3	0	0	3
11	Latvia	3rd place, bronze medalist(s)			1st place, gold medalist(s)		3rd place, bronze medalist(s)	1	0	2	3
12	Russia			1st place, gold medalist(s)		1st place, gold medalist(s)		2	0	0	2
13	China		2nd place, silver medalist(s)		1st place, gold medalist(s)			1	1	0	2
14	Italy	2nd place, silver medalist(s)				3rd place, bronze medalist(s)		0	1	1	2
14	Poland			3rd place, bronze medalist(s)		2nd place, silver medalist(s)		0	1	1	2
16	Qatar	3rd place, bronze medalist(s)				3rd place, bronze medalist(s)		0	0	2	2
17	Argentina			1st place, gold medalist(s)				1	0	0	1
18	Austria			2nd place, silver medalist(s)				0	1	0	1
18	ROC^{*}	2nd place, silver medalist(s)						0	1	0	1
18	Spain	2nd place, silver medalist(s)						0	1	0	1
21	France			3rd place, bronze medalist(s)				0	0	1	1

==== Men ====
Last updated after the 2025 Beach Volleyball World Championships (As of 23 November 2025)
		Beach volleyball			Number of			
		Olympic Games	World Championships	World Tour Finals	Number of			
Rk.	Nation	Men	Men	Men	1st place, gold medalist(s)	2nd place, silver medalist(s)	3rd place, bronze medalist(s)	Total
1	Brazil	1st place, gold medalist(s)	1st place, gold medalist(s)	1st place, gold medalist(s)	3	0	0	3
1	Norway	1st place, gold medalist(s)	1st place, gold medalist(s)	1st place, gold medalist(s)	3	0	0	3
1	Sweden	1st place, gold medalist(s)	1st place, gold medalist(s)	1st place, gold medalist(s)	3	0	0	3
1	United States	1st place, gold medalist(s)	1st place, gold medalist(s)	1st place, gold medalist(s)	3	0	0	3
5	Germany	1st place, gold medalist(s)	1st place, gold medalist(s)	2nd place, silver medalist(s)	2	1	0	3
6	Netherlands	3rd place, bronze medalist(s)	1st place, gold medalist(s)	3rd place, bronze medalist(s)	1	0	2	3
7	Russia		1st place, gold medalist(s)	1st place, gold medalist(s)	2	0	0	2
8	Czech Republic		1st place, gold medalist(s)	2nd place, silver medalist(s)	1	1	0	2
9	Italy	2nd place, silver medalist(s)		3rd place, bronze medalist(s)	0	1	1	2
9	Poland		3rd place, bronze medalist(s)	2nd place, silver medalist(s)	0	1	1	2
9	Switzerland	3rd place, bronze medalist(s)	2nd place, silver medalist(s)		0	1	1	2
12	Qatar	3rd place, bronze medalist(s)		3rd place, bronze medalist(s)	0	0	2	2
13	Argentina		1st place, gold medalist(s)		1	0	0	1
14	Austria		2nd place, silver medalist(s)		0	1	0	1
14	ROC^{*}	2nd place, silver medalist(s)			0	1	0	1
13	Spain	2nd place, silver medalist(s)			0	1	0	1
17	Australia		3rd place, bronze medalist(s)		0	0	1	1
17	Canada	3rd place, bronze medalist(s)			0	0	1	1
17	France		3rd place, bronze medalist(s)		0	0	1	1
17	Latvia	3rd place, bronze medalist(s)			0	0	1	1

==== Women ====
Last updated after the 2025 Beach Volleyball World Championships (As of 23 November 2025)
		Beach volleyball			Number of			
		Olympic Games	World Championships	World Tour Finals	Number of			
Rk.	Nation	Women	Women	Women	1st place, gold medalist(s)	2nd place, silver medalist(s)	3rd place, bronze medalist(s)	Total
1	Brazil	1st place, gold medalist(s)	1st place, gold medalist(s)	1st place, gold medalist(s)	3	0	0	3
1	Germany	1st place, gold medalist(s)	1st place, gold medalist(s)	1st place, gold medalist(s)	3	0	0	3
1	United States	1st place, gold medalist(s)	1st place, gold medalist(s)	1st place, gold medalist(s)	3	0	0	3
4	Canada	2nd place, silver medalist(s)	1st place, gold medalist(s)	2nd place, silver medalist(s)	1	2	0	3
5	Australia	1st place, gold medalist(s)	3rd place, bronze medalist(s)	3rd place, bronze medalist(s)	1	0	2	3
6	China	2nd place, silver medalist(s)	1st place, gold medalist(s)		1	1	0	2
7	Latvia		1st place, gold medalist(s)	3rd place, bronze medalist(s)	1	0	1	2
8	Czech Republic		3rd place, bronze medalist(s)	2nd place, silver medalist(s)	0	1	1	2
8	Switzerland	3rd place, bronze medalist(s)		2nd place, silver medalist(s)	0	1	1	2
10	Netherlands			3rd place, bronze medalist(s)	0	0	1	1

=== Sitting volleyball ===
==== Men and women ====
Last updated after the 2026 Sitting Volleyball World Championships (As of 17 July 2026)
		Sitting volleyball				Number of			
		Paralympic Games		World Championship		Number of			
Rk.	Nation	Men	Women	Men	Women	1st place, gold medalist(s)	2nd place, silver medalist(s)	3rd place, bronze medalist(s)	Total
1	Netherlands	1st place, gold medalist(s)	2nd place, silver medalist(s)	1st place, gold medalist(s)	1st place, gold medalist(s)	3	1	0	4
2	Brazil		3rd place, bronze medalist(s)	2nd place, silver medalist(s)	1st place, gold medalist(s)	1	1	1	3
3	Finland	3rd place, bronze medalist(s)		2nd place, silver medalist(s)	2nd place, silver medalist(s)	0	2	1	3
4	Bosnia and Herzegovina	1st place, gold medalist(s)		1st place, gold medalist(s)		2	0	0	2
4	China		1st place, gold medalist(s)		1st place, gold medalist(s)	2	0	0	2
4	Iran	1st place, gold medalist(s)		1st place, gold medalist(s)		2	0	0	2
4	United States		1st place, gold medalist(s)		1st place, gold medalist(s)	2	0	0	2
8	Russia	3rd place, bronze medalist(s)			1st place, gold medalist(s)	1	0	1	2
9	Norway	2nd place, silver medalist(s)		2nd place, silver medalist(s)		0	2	0	2
9	West Germany^{*}	2nd place, silver medalist(s)		2nd place, silver medalist(s)		0	2	0	2
11	Canada		3rd place, bronze medalist(s)		2nd place, silver medalist(s)	0	1	1	2
11	Germany	3rd place, bronze medalist(s)		2nd place, silver medalist(s)		0	1	1	2
11	Yugoslavia^{*}	3rd place, bronze medalist(s)		2nd place, silver medalist(s)		0	1	1	2
14	Egypt	3rd place, bronze medalist(s)		3rd place, bronze medalist(s)		0	0	2	2
14	Ukraine		3rd place, bronze medalist(s)		3rd place, bronze medalist(s)	0	0	2	2
16	Hungary			2nd place, silver medalist(s)		0	1	0	1
16	Latvia				2nd place, silver medalist(s)	0	1	0	1
16	RPC*	2nd place, silver medalist(s)				0	1	0	1
16	Slovenia				2nd place, silver medalist(s)	0	1	0	1
16	Sweden	2nd place, silver medalist(s)				0	1	0	1
21	Lithuania				3rd place, bronze medalist(s)	0	0	1	1
21	Kazakhstan			3rd place, bronze medalist(s)		0	0	1	1

^{*}Defunct National Paralympic Committees (NPCs) or historical teams are shown in italic.

==== Men ====
Last updated after the 2026 Sitting Volleyball World Championships (As of 17 July 2026)
		Sitting volleyball		Number of			
		Paralympic Games	World Championship	Number of			
Rk.	Nation	Men	Men	1st place, gold medalist(s)	2nd place, silver medalist(s)	3rd place, bronze medalist(s)	Total
1	Bosnia and Herzegovina	1st place, gold medalist(s)	1st place, gold medalist(s)	2	0	0	2
1	Iran	1st place, gold medalist(s)	1st place, gold medalist(s)	2	0	0	2
1	Netherlands	1st place, gold medalist(s)	1st place, gold medalist(s)	2	0	0	2
4	Norway	2nd place, silver medalist(s)	2nd place, silver medalist(s)	0	2	0	2
4	West Germany^{*}	2nd place, silver medalist(s)	2nd place, silver medalist(s)	0	2	0	2
6	Finland	3rd place, bronze medalist(s)	2nd place, silver medalist(s)	0	1	1	2
6	Germany	3rd place, bronze medalist(s)	2nd place, silver medalist(s)	0	1	1	2
6	Yugoslavia^{*}	3rd place, bronze medalist(s)	2nd place, silver medalist(s)	0	1	1	2
9	Egypt	3rd place, bronze medalist(s)	3rd place, bronze medalist(s)	0	0	2	2
10	Brazil		2nd place, silver medalist(s)	0	1	0	1
10	Hungary		2nd place, silver medalist(s)	0	1	0	1
10	RPC*	2nd place, silver medalist(s)		0	1	0	1
10	Sweden	2nd place, silver medalist(s)		0	1	0	1
14	Kazakhstan		3rd place, bronze medalist(s)	0	0	1	1
14	Russia	3rd place, bronze medalist(s)		0	0	1	1

^{*}Defunct National Paralympic Committees (NPCs) or historical teams are shown in italic.

==== Women ====
Last updated after the 2026 Sitting Volleyball World Championships (As of 17 July 2026)
		Sitting volleyball		Number of			
		Paralympic Games	World Championship	Number of			
Rk.	Nation	Women	Women	1st place, gold medalist(s)	2nd place, silver medalist(s)	3rd place, bronze medalist(s)	Total
1	China	1st place, gold medalist(s)	1st place, gold medalist(s)	2	0	0	2
1	United States	1st place, gold medalist(s)	1st place, gold medalist(s)	2	0	0	2
3	Netherlands	2nd place, silver medalist(s)	1st place, gold medalist(s)	1	1	0	2
4	Brazil	3rd place, bronze medalist(s)	1st place, gold medalist(s)	1	0	1	2
5	Canada	3rd place, bronze medalist(s)	2nd place, silver medalist(s)	0	1	1	2
6	Ukraine	3rd place, bronze medalist(s)	3rd place, bronze medalist(s)	0	0	2	2
7	Russia		1st place, gold medalist(s)	1	0	0	1
8	Finland		2nd place, silver medalist(s)	0	1	0	1
8	Latvia		2nd place, silver medalist(s)	0	1	0	1
8	Slovenia		2nd place, silver medalist(s)	0	1	0	1
11	Lithuania		3rd place, bronze medalist(s)	0	0	1	1

== See also ==
- List of indoor volleyball world medalists
- FIVB World Rankings
- FIVB Beach Volleyball World Rankings
- Volleyball records and statistics
- List of major achievements in sports by nation
