= Fédération Internationale de Volleyball =

International gverning body of volleyball

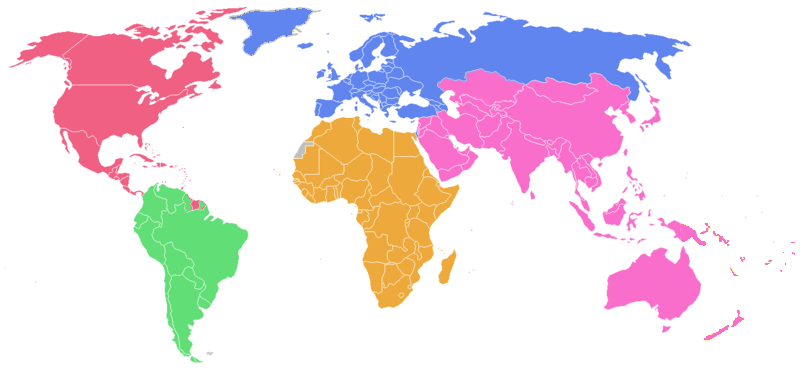
- Map of the members of FIVB according to their confederation
- Abbreviation: FIVB
- Predecessor: International Amateur Handball Federation
- Founded: 20 April 1947; 79 years ago
- Founded at: Paris, France
- Type: Sports federation
- Legal status: Governing body of Volleyball
- Purpose: Sport governance
- Headquarters: Lausanne, Switzerland
- Region served: Worldwide
- Members: 222 national associations
- Official languages: English, French, Spanish, Arabic, Portuguese, Russian
- President: Fabio Azevedo
- Main organ: Congress
- Subsidiaries: 5: AVC (Asian Confederation); CAVB (African Confederation); CEV (European Confederation); CSV (South American Confederation); NORCECA (North, Central American and Caribbean Confederation)
- Affiliations: International Olympic Committee
- Revenue: US$65.34 million (2017)
- Expenses: US$60.54 million (2017)
- Website: fivb.com

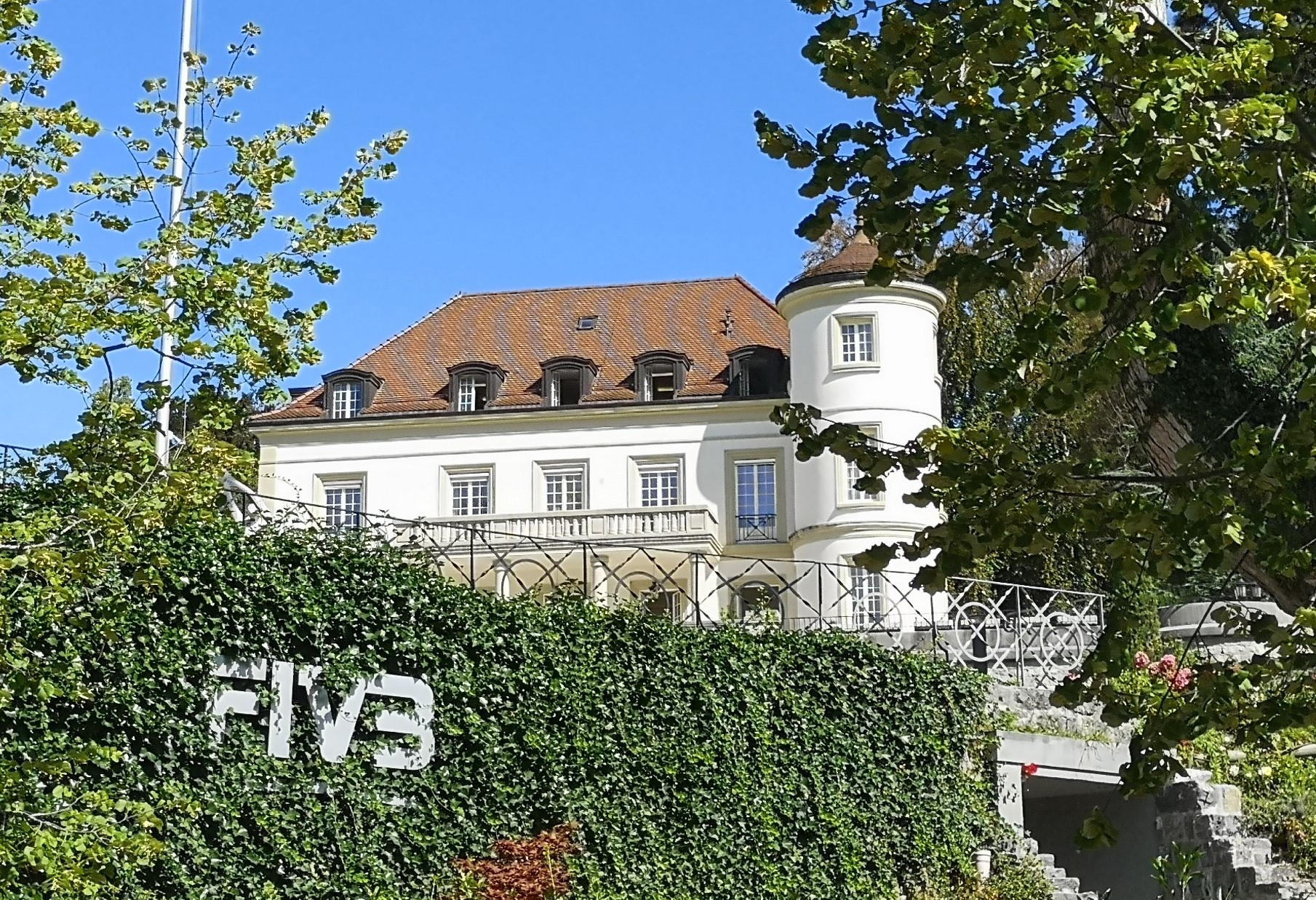
FIVB Headquarters in Lausanne

The Fédération Internationale de Volleyball (French for 'International Volleyball Federation'), commonly known by the acronym FIVB, is the international governing body for all forms of volleyball. Its headquarters are located in Lausanne, Switzerland, and its current president is Fabio Azevedo of Brazil.

== History ==
Before the FIVB was founded volleyball was part of the International Amateur Handball Federation. The FIVB was founded in France in April 1947. In the late 1940s, some of the European national federations began to address the issue of creating an international governing body for the sport of volleyball. Initial discussions eventually lead to the installation of a Constitutive Congress in 1947. Fourteen national federations representing five continents attended the meetings where, between 18 and 20 April, the entity was officially formed, having Frenchman Paul Libaud as first president. The first Asian volleyball championship was held in Tokyo, Japan in 1955 and in this championship India had beaten Japan in final.

One of the main goals of the 1947 Congress was achieved two years later with the establishment of the first international major volleyball event, the World Championship. In 1952, a women's version of the tournament was also introduced.

In 1964, the IOC endorsed the addition of volleyball to the Olympic programme. By this time, the number of national federations affiliated to the FIVB had grown to 89. Later in that year (1969), a new international event, the World Cup was introduced. It would be turned into a qualifying event for the Olympic Games in 1991.

Following Libaud's retirement and the election of Mexican Rubén Acosta Hernandez for the position of president in 1984, the FIVB moved its headquarters from Paris, France to Lausanne, Switzerland and intensified to an unprecedented level its policy of promoting volleyball on a worldwide basis. Measures taken in this direction include the establishment of annual competitions for men's and women's volleyball (the World League, in 1990, and the Grand Prix, in 1993), the indication of Beach volleyball as an Olympic event (1996) and a number of changes in the rules of the game with the purpose of enhancing public visibility.

On 19 June 2008, Wei Jizhong (Chinese: 魏纪中) of China, who during this period served as the 1st Vice president took over during the 31st World Congress in Dubai when Rubén Acosta decided to step down. Mr. Jizhong Wei became the third president in the history of the FIVB. The handover of the presidency took place on 24 August 2008 in Beijing.

As of 2020, the FIVB counted 222 affiliated national federations.

In response to the 2022 Russian invasion of Ukraine, the Fédération Internationale de Volleyball suspended all Russian national teams, clubs, and officials, as well as beach and snow volleyball athletes, from all events, and stripped Russia of the right to host the 2022 FIVB Volleyball Men's World Championship in August 2022, and relocated games that were to be in Russia in June and July.

In 2026, despite the war still ongoing, all sanctions on Russia were lifted, allowing the country to resume competing with its flag and anthem in all international competitions.

== Tournaments ==
=== Indoor ===
National teams:

Men

- Olympic Volleyball: since 1964, quadrennially
- Men's World Cup: since 1949, biennially (Note: The second Men's World Championship was held in 1952, and thereafter has been held every four years.)
- Men's Nations League: since 2018, annually
- Men's U21 World Championship: since 1977, biennially
- Boys' U19 World Championship: since 1989, biennially
- Boys' U17 World Championship: since 2024, biennially

Women

- Olympic Women's Volleyball: since 1964, quadrennially
- Women's World Cup: since 1952, biennially
- Women's Nations League: since 2018, annually
- Women's U21 World Championship: since 1977, biennially
- Girls' U19 World Championship: since 1989, biennially
- Girls' U17 World Championship: since 2024, biennially

Clubs:

Men

- Men's Club World Championship: since 1989, annually

Women

- Women's Club World Championship: since 1991, annually

Defunct:

- Men's World Cup: 1965–2019, quadrennially
- Women's World Cup: 1973–2019, quadrennially
- World League (Men): 1990–2017, annually
- World Grand Prix (Women): 1993–2017, annually
- World Grand Champions Cup: 1993–2017, quadrennially
- Men's Challenger Cup: 2018–2024, annually
- Women's Challenger Cup: 2018–2024, annually

=== Beach ===
- Olympic Games: since 1996, quadrennially
- World Championship: since 1997, biennially
- World Tour: since 1989, annually
- Youth Olympic Games: since 2014, quadrennially
- U23 World Championships: since 2013, annually
- U21 World Championships: since 2001, annually
- U19 World Championships: since 2003, annually
- U17 World Championships: since 2014, annually

=== Others ===
The FIVB's main activity is worldwide planning and organisation of volleyball events, sometimes in conjunction with other international governing bodies such as the IOC. This involves defining qualification procedures and competition formulae for tournaments, as well as more specific details such as player line-up and replacement restrictions, venues and hosts.

The FIVB participates directly in the organization of continental volleyball events which have an attached international significance, such as Olympic and World Championship continental qualification tournaments.

The FIVB also maintains extensive special programmes aimed at the advance of world volleyball. This includes the constitution of development centers in areas where the sport is still unpopular, as well as support (in instruction and equipment) for organizations that fail to meet the quality standards required on an international level. Therefore, FIVB organizes congress, workshops, courses for referees, coaches and teachers, to promote grassroot volleyball development, such as:

- Volley All Festival
- Good Net Project in 2019
- School Volleyball Congress in 2007
- Volleyball Medicine Congress in 2011
- Symposium on Match Analysis in 1981
- Symposium on Mini Volleyball in 1985

Another relevant area of concern is the promotion of volleyball in a worldwide scale. Part of the FIVB's activities in this area consists in attracting media partners and sponsors through negotiation of commercial rights for broadcasting and coverage of major events.

As reported by Olympic news outlet Around the Rings, the FIVB recently launched a new "FIVB Heroes" promotion in Rome. The campaign uses billboards, posters and statues of the top beach volleyball players situated around the city to enhance visibility and profiles of the athletes.

The FIVB is responsible for the standardization of volleyball rules. In recent years, many changes were implemented in connection with its promotional and marketing vision, in an alleged attempt to improve public visibility and make the sport comply to the demands of sponsors and media organizations. These changes range from ingenuous, almost commonplace restrictions, such as the obligation of a "fashionable" uniform – meaning tight clothing, supposed to be more appealing to the audience because it makes players bodies salient –, to very drastic changes in the format of competitions (e.g., the rally-point system).

The FIVB is the ultimate international authority in volleyball, and judges (or is involved at least to some degree in the judgement) issues such as doping, regulation of player transfer, nationality changes and gender determination. It also publishes the FIVB World Rankings, used as basis for seeding in international competitions.

== Current champions ==
=== Nations ===
Tournament		Senior (M) – (W)	U21 (M U21) – (W U21)	U19 (M U19) – (W U19)	U17 (M U17) – (W U17)
World Cup	(Men)	Italy (2025)	Iran (2025)	France (2025)	Iran (2026)
World Cup	(Women)	Italy (2025)	Italy (2025)	Bulgaria (2025)	United States (2026)
Olympic Games	(Men)	France (2024)	N/A	Cuba (2010)	N/A
Olympic Games	(Women)	Italy (2024)	N/A	Belgium (2010)	N/A
Volleyball Nations League	(Men)	Poland (2026)	N/A		
Volleyball Nations League	(Women)	Turkey (2026)	N/A		
Confederation		Senior	U21/U20	U19/U18	U17/U16
Africa (CAVB)	(Men)	Tunisia (2026)	Egypt (2025)	Nigeria (2026)	Egypt (2025)
Africa (CAVB)	(Women)	Egypt (2026)	Kenya (2025)	Tunisia (2026)	Egypt (2025)
Asia & Oceania (AVC)	(Men)	Japan (2026)	Iran (2024)	Iran (2026)	Pakistan (2025)
Asia & Oceania (AVC)	(Women)	Thailand (2026)	China (2024)	China (2026)	South Korea (2025)
Europe (CEV)	(Men)	Poland (2026)	France (2024)	Poland (2026)	Italy (2025)
Europe (CEV)	(Women)	Turkey (2026)	Turkey (2024)	Italy (2026)	Poland (2025)
North America (NORCECA)	(Men)	United States (2026)	United States (2024)	Canada (2026)	Puerto Rico (2025)
North America (NORCECA)	(Women)	Canada (2026)	United States (2024)	United States (2026)	United States (2025)
South America (CSV)	(Men)	Brazil (2026)	Brazil (2024)	Brazil (2026)	Brazil (2026)
South America (CSV)	(Women)	Brazil (2026)	Brazil (2024)	Argentina (2026)	Venezuela (2025)

=== Clubs ===
Confederation		Tournament	Championship
Club World Championship	Men	FIVB Volleyball Men's Club World Championship	(Italy) Sir Sicoma Monini Perugia (2025)
Club World Championship	Women	FIVB Volleyball Women's Club World Championship	(Italy) Savino Del Bene Scandicci (2025)
Africa (CAVB)	Men	African Clubs Championship	(Egypt) Al Ahly SC (2026)
Africa (CAVB)	Women	Women's African Clubs Championship	(Egypt) Al Ahly SC (2026)
Asia & Oceania (AVC)	Men	AVC Men's Champions League	(Indonesia) Bhayangkara Presisi (2026)
Asia & Oceania (AVC)	Women	AVC Women's Champions League	(Japan) NEC Red Rockets (2026)
Europe (CEV)	Men	CEV Champions League	(Italy) Sir Sicoma Monini Perugia (2026)
Europe (CEV)	Women	CEV Women's Champions League	(Turkey) VakifBank Istanbul (2026)
South America (CSV)	Men	Men's South American Volleyball Club Championship	(Brazil) Sada Cruzeiro (2026)
South America (CSV)	Women	Women's South American Volleyball Club Championship	(Brazil) SESI Bauru (2026)

=== Beach volleyball ===
==== Intercontinental events ====
	Olympic Games	World Championship	World Tour
Men	David Åhman and Jonatan Hellvig (SWE) (2024)	David Åhman and Jonatan Hellvig (SWE) (2025)	Anders Mol and Christian Sørum (NOR) (2024)
Women	Ana Patrícia and Duda Lisboa (BRA) (2024)	Tīna Graudiņa and Anastasija Samoilova (LAT) (2025)	Kristen Nuss and Taryn Kloth (USA) (2024)

==== Under-age events ====
	Youth Olympic Games	U23 World Championship	U21 World Championship	U19 World Championship	U17 World Championship
Men	Paul Hohenauer and Martin Poinstingl (AUT) (2026)	Maciej Kosiak and Maciej Rudol (POL) (2014)	Gustavs Auziņš and Kristians Fokerots (LAT) (2025)	Lasse Hüper and Filo Wüst (GER) (2026)	Florian Breer and Yves Haussener (SUI) (2014)
Women	Jara Both and Matilda de Groot (NED) (2026)	Mariafe Artacho and Nicole Laird (AUS) (2014)	Sally Perez and Avery Jackson (USA) (2025)	Anna-Chiara Reformat and Sandra Otte (GER) (2026)	Morgan Martin and Kathryn Plummer (USA) (2014)

== Rankings ==
=== Men's ===
The following table has the Top 20 ranked men's volleyball countries in the world.

Top 20 rankings as of 15 October 2026
Rank	Change	Team	Points
1	Steady	Poland	422.98
2	Steady	Italy	362.55
3	Steady	Russia	359.48
4	Steady	United States	358.6
5	Steady	Japan	352.7
6	Steady	Brazil	333.79
7	Steady	Slovenia	325.01
8	Steady	France	323.43
9	Steady	Bulgaria	285.01
10	Steady	Finland	263.92
11	Steady	Germany	262
12	Steady	Ukraine	255.62
13	Steady	Cuba	250.31
14	Steady	Argentina	245.7
15	Steady	Belgium	244.77
16	Steady	Canada	209.21
17	Steady	Turkey	237.64
18	Steady	Serbia	224.83
19	Steady	Iran	224.7
20	Steady	Czech Republic	214.91
*Change from 1 October 2026
Complete rankings at volleyballworld.com

=== Women's ===
The following table has the Top 20 ranked women's volleyball countries in the world.

Top 20 rankings as of 2 October 2026
Rank	Change	Team	Points
1	Steady	Italy	468.93
2	Steady	Brazil	420.13
3	Steady	Turkey	411.83
4	▲3	United States	366.4
5	▼1	Poland	360.04
6	▼1	Japan	337.16
7	▼1	China	324.9
8	▲4	Canada	321.52
9	Steady	Serbia	316.36
10	▼2	Netherlands	296.82
11	Steady	Russia	285.21
12	▼2	Germany	256.45
13	▲5	Thailand	244.01
14	▼3	Dominican Republic	236
15	Steady	Czech Republic	233.14
16	▼2	Belgium	231.32
17	▼4	France	225.88
18	▲2	Slovenia	212.76
19	▲7	Sweden	207.42
20	▼3	Argentina	207.22
*Change from 24 May 2026
Complete rankings at volleyballworld.com

== Other events ==
The FIVB is also responsible for the volleyball games at some regional competitions as:

- Asian Games
- European Games
- Pan American Games
- Lusophony Games
- All-Africa Games

== Organization ==
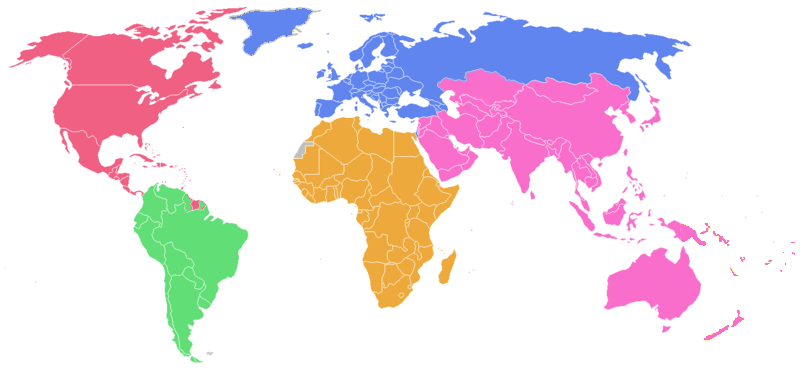
Map of the Continental Confederations affiliated to the FIVB

World Congress: The supreme authority convened every two years, electing the President and members of the Board.

Board of Administration: Responsible for the overall management of the FIVB, overseeing the work of the national federations, confederations, commissions and councils and appoints officials including members of the executive committee.

Executive Committee: Composed of board members and each member is charged with important and specific responsibilities, assisted by Commissions, Committees and Councils.

- Legal Commission
- Finance Commission
- Communication Commission
- Rules of the Games and Refereeing Commission
- Technical and Coaching Commission
- Medical Commission
- Development Commission
- Beach Volleyball Commission
- Athletes Commission
- Sports Events Council
- Beach Volleyball World Tour Council
- World League Council
- World Grand Prix Council
- World Championships Council

Judicial Bodies

- FIVB Disciplinary Panel
- FIVB Appeals Panel
- FIVB Ethics Panel
- FIVB Tribunal

The FIVB also presides over five continental confederations:

- Asian Volleyball Confederation (AVC) in Asia and Oceania
- Confederación Sudamericana de Voleibol (CSV) in South America
- African Volleyball Confederation (CAVB) in Africa
- European Volleyball Confederation (CEV) in Europe
- North, Central America and Caribbean Volleyball Confederation (NORCECA) in North America

Each continental confederation, by its turn, presides over a number of national federations located in its domain of action.

== FIVB Heroes ==
"FIVB Heroes" is the official image campaign of the FIVB. The campaign aims to raise awareness of the players’ athletic achievements and to increase the worldwide interest in the sport. “FIVB Heroes” features 33 volleyball and 29 beach volleyball players from 19 countries, who were selected due to their outstanding performance.

== FIVB presidents ==
- (France) Paul Libaud (1947–1984)
- (Mexico) Rubén Acosta Hernández (1984–2008)
- (China) Wei Jizhong (2008–2012)
- (Brazil) Ary Graça (2012–2024)
- (Brazil) Fabio Azevedo (2024–)

== Sponsors ==
Sponsors of the FIVB
- 1xBet
- Mikasa
- Ganten
- Gerflor
- Senoh
- Mizuno

== See also ==
- Volleyball Hall of Fame
- List of international sports federations
