= FIVB Volleyball World League statistics =

This article gives the summarized final standings of each FIVB Volleyball World League tournament, an annual competition involving national men's volleyball teams. The most successful teams, as of 2017, have been: Brazil, 9 times (1993, 2001, 2003–07, 2009–10) and Italy, 8 times (1990–92, 1994–95, 1997, 1999–2000). The competition has been won 3 times by Russia (2002, 2011, 2013), twice by United States (2008, 2014) and France (2015, 2017) and once by Netherlands (1996), Cuba (1998), Poland (2012) and Serbia (2016).

== Summary I ==
- 1st - Champions
- 2nd - Runners-up
- 3rd - Third place
- - – Did not enter / Did not qualify
- – Hosts

Team	(Japan); 1990 (8)	(Italy); 1991 (10)	(Italy); 1992 (12)	(Brazil); 1993 (12)	(Italy); 1994 (12)	(Brazil); 1995 (12)	(Netherlands); 1996 (11)	(Russia); 1997 (12)	(Italy); 1998 (12)	(Argentina); 1999 (12)	(Netherlands); 2000 (12)	(Poland); 2001 (16)	(Brazil); 2002 (16)	(Spain); 2003 (16)	(Italy); 2004 (12)	(Serbia and Montenegro); 2005 (12)	(Russia); 2006 (16)	(Poland); 2007 (16)	(Brazil); 2008 (16)	(Serbia); 2009 (16)	(Argentina); 2010 (16)	(Poland); 2011 (16)	(Bulgaria); 2012 (16)	(Argentina); 2013 (18)	(Italy); 2014 (28)	(Brazil); 2015 (32)	(Poland); 2016 (36)	(Brazil); 2017 (36)	Total
Argentina	-	-	-	-	-	-	7th	8th	9th	6th	8th	13th	9th	-	-	10th	7th	13th	-	5th	5th	4th	10th	6th	13th	11th	10th	10th	19
Australia	-	-	-	-	-	-	-	-	-	10th	-	-	-	-	-	-	-	-	-	-	-	-	-	-	5th	8th	12th	15th	5
Austria	-	-	-	-	-	-	-	-	-	-	-	-	-	-	-	-	-	-	-	-	-	-	-	-	-	-	-	29th	1
Belgium	-	-	-	-	-	-	-	-	-	-	-	-	-	-	-	-	-	-	-	-	-	-	-	-	11th	12th	9th	7th	4
Brazil	3rd	5th	5th	1st	3rd	2nd	5th	5th	5th	3rd	3rd	1st	2nd	1st	1st	1st	1st	1st	4th	1st	1st	2nd	6th	2nd	2nd	5th	2nd	2nd	28
Bulgaria	-	-	-	-	4th	5th	8th	6th	7th	-	-	-	-	5th	4th	5th	4th	5th	7th	10th	7th	5th	4th	4th	8th	10th	11th	9th	20
Canada	-	10th	7th	-	-	-	-	-	-	8th	11th	-	-	-	-	-	-	13th	-	-	-	-	12th	5th	13th	15th	13th	3rd	11
China	8th	-	9th	7th	11th	11th	6th	10th	-	-	-	-	9th	-	10th	-	13th	9th	7th	13th	15th	-	-	-	23rd	24th	19th	17th	18
Chinese Taipei	-	-	-	-	-	-	-	-	-	-	-	-	-	-	-	-	-	-	-	-	-	-	-	-	-	-	28th	33rd	2
Cuba	-	2nd	2nd	4th	2nd	3rd	4th	2nd	1st	2nd	8th	5th	13th	13th	7th	3rd	7th	7th	10th	4th	4th	8th	3rd	13th	21st	18th	22nd	-	26
Czech Republic	-	-	-	-	-	-	-	-	-	-	-	-	-	4th	-	-	-	-	-	-	-	-	-	-	16th	15th	18th	20th	5
Egypt	-	-	-	-	-	-	-	-	-	-	-	-	-	-	-	-	13th	13th	13th	-	14th	-	-	-	-	21st	20th	24th	7
Estonia	-	-	-	-	-	-	-	-	-	-	-	-	-	-	-	-	-	-	-	-	-	-	-	-	-	-	-	25th	1
Finland	-	-	-	13th	-	-	-	-	-	-	-	-	-	-	-	-	10th	7th	10th	8th	13th	10th	13th	16th	16th	15th	17th	21st	13
France	5th	8th	11th	-	-	-	-	-	-	7th	7th	5th	7th	10th	5th	10th	2nd	6th	10th	9th	12th	12th	7th	10th	10th	1st	3rd	1st	22
Germany	-	-	12th	8th	10th	-	-	-	-	-	-	13th	9th	10th	-	-	-	-	-	-	9th	11th	5th	7th	16th	-	26th	27th	13
Greece	-	-	-	11th	7th	9th	11th	-	12th	-	-	9th	9th	7th	5th	7th	-	-	-	-	-	-	-	-	-	25th	27th	36th	13
Italy	1st	1st	1st	3rd	1st	1st	2nd	1st	4th	1st	1st	2nd	4th	3rd	2nd	7th	6th	9th	7th	7th	6th	6th	11th	3rd	3rd	5th	4th	12th	28
Iran	-	-	-	-	-	-	-	-	-	-	-	-	-	-	-	-	-	-	-	-	-	-	-	9th	4th	7th	8th	11th	5
Japan	6th	7th	10th	6th	8th	8th	9th	12th	-	-	-	9th	13th	13th	10th	10th	13th	13th	6th	15th	-	15th	15th	18th	19th	13th	24th	14th	24
Kazakhstan	-	-	-	-	-	-	-	-	-	-	-	-	-	-	-	-	-	-	-	-	-	-	-	-	-	28th	35th	35th	3
Mexico	-	-	-	-	-	-	-	-	-	-	-	-	-	-	-	-	-	-	-	-	-	-	-	-	25th	30th	34th	28th	4
Montenegro	-	-	-	-	-	-	-	-	-	-	-	-	-	-	-	-	-	-	-	-	-	-	-	-	-	22nd	29th	31st	3
Netherlands	2nd	4th	4th	5th	5th	12th	1st	4th	3rd	10th	5th	7th	7th	10th	-	-	-	-	-	12th	11th	-	-	14th	12th	13th	15th	16th	21
Puerto Rico	-	-	-	-	-	-	-	-	-	-	-	-	-	-	-	-	-	-	-	-	-	16th	-	-	27th	28th	36th	-	4
Poland	-	-	-	-	-	-	-	-	10th	8th	8th	7th	5th	9th	7th	4th	7th	4th	5th	11th	10th	3rd	1st	11th	8th	4th	5th	8th	20
Portugal	-	-	-	-	-	-	-	-	-	10th	-	13th	13th	13th	10th	5th	13th	-	-	-	-	14th	16th	17th	13th	18th	14th	22nd	14
Qatar	-	-	-	-	-	-	-	-	-	-	-	-	-	-	-	-	-	-	-	-	-	-	-	-	-	-	31st	32nd	2
Russia	4th	3rd	6th	2nd	6th	4th	3rd	3rd	2nd	4th	2nd	3rd	1st	7th	-	-	3rd	2nd	3rd	3rd	2nd	1st	8th	1st	5th	8th	7th	5th	26
Serbia	-	-	-	-	-	-	-	7th	6th	-	4th	4th	3rd	2nd	3rd	2nd	5th	9th	2nd	2nd	3rd	9th	9th	8th	7th	2nd	1st	5th	20
Slovakia	-	-	-	-	-	-	-	-	-	-	-	-	-	-	-	-	-	-	-	-	-	-	-	-	24th	23rd	21st	19th	4
Slovenia	-	-	-	-	-	-	-	-	-	-	-	-	-	-	-	-	-	-	-	-	-	-	-	-	-	-	25th	13th	2
South Korea	-	9th	8th	10th	9th	6th	-	11th	11th	-	-	-	-	-	-	-	10th	9th	13th	14th	16th	13th	14th	15th	19th	18th	23rd	18th	19
Spain	-	-	-	-	-	7th	10th	9th	8th	5th	11th	9th	5th	5th	7th	-	-	-	13th	-	-	-	-	-	25th	25th	32nd	26th	15
Tunisia	-	-	-	-	-	-	-	-	-	-	-	-	-	-	-	-	-	-	-	-	-	-	-	-	27th	30th	33rd	30th	4
Turkey	-	-	-	-	-	-	-	-	-	-	-	-	-	-	-	-	-	-	-	-	-	-	-	-	22nd	25th	16th	23rd	4
United States	7th	6th	3rd	9th	12th	10th	-	-	-	-	6th	9th	-	-	-	-	10th	3rd	1st	6th	8th	7th	2nd	12th	1st	3rd	5th	4th	20
Venezuela	-	-	-	-	-	-	-	-	-	-	-	13th	13th	13th	-	7th	-	-	13th	16th	-	-	-	-	-	30th	30th	34th	9

== Summary II ==
After 2017 World League

- Qualifications are not included

National team	App	F4	Group I & II (Note: Note that Group system was introduced in 2014 (though similar system based on FIVB ratings was used in 2013) - everything before that is considered Group I.)				Group III					Final Round (Note: Since Group system was introduced statistics of only Group I Final Round is included, as this is the medal round.)					
National team	App	F4	%	Pld	W	L	App	%	Pld	W	L	A%	App	W%	Pld	W	L
Argentina	19	1	0.372	247	92	155	—	—	—	—	—	0.053	1	0.500	2	1	1
Australia	5	0	0.259	58	15	43	—	—	—	—	—	0.200	1	0.000	2	0	2
Austria	1	0	0.000	0	0	0	1	0.667	6	4	2	0.000	0	0.000	0	0	0
Belgium	4	0	0.543	46	25	21	—	—	—	—	—	0.000	0	0.000	0	0	0
Brazil	28	21	0.762	437	333	104	—	—	—	—	—	0.893	25	0.699	93	65	28
Bulgaria	20	0	0.554	271	150	121	—	—	—	—	—	0.500	10	0.390	41	16	25
Canada	11	1	0.423	130	55	75	—	—	—	—	—	0.091	1	0.500	4	2	2
China	18	0	0.264	197	52	145	2	0.750	16	12	4	0.056	1	0.250	4	1	3
Cuba	26	13	0.611	373	228	145	1	0.833	6	5	1	0.577	15	0.426	54	23	31
Czech Republic	5	0	0.481	81	39	42	—	—	—	—	—	0.200	1	0.400	5	2	3
Egypt	7	0	0.172	64	11	53	1	0.875	8	7	1	0.000	0	0.000	0	0	0
Estonia	1	0	0.000	0	0	0	1	0.833	6	5	1	0.000	0	0.000	0	0	0
Finland	13	0	0.372	156	58	98	—	—	—	—	—	0.000	0	0.000	0	0	0
France	22	4	0.522	291	152	139	—	—	—	—	—	0.318	7	0.458	24	11	13
Germany	13	0	0.382	152	58	94	2	0.583	12	7	5	0.077	1	0.500	2	1	1
Greece	13	0	0.331	130	43	87	3	0.500	18	9	9	0.077	1	0.000	3	0	3
Iran	5	1	0.446	56	25	31	—	—	—	—	—	0.200	1	0.250	4	1	3
Italy	28	19	0.670	415	278	137	—	—	—	—	—	0.786	22	0.588	80	47	33
Japan	24	0	0.235	306	72	234	—	—	—	—	—	0.042	1	0.000	2	0	2
Kazakhstan	3	0	0.000	0	0	0	3	0.167	18	3	15	0.000	0	0.000	0	0	0
Mexico	4	0	0.000	0	0	0	4	0.208	24	5	19	0.000	0	0.000	0	0	0
Montenegro	3	0	0.000	0	0	0	3	0.650	20	13	7	0.000	0	0.000	0	0	0
Netherlands	21	6	0.566	302	171	131	—	—	—	—	—	0.476	10	0.406	32	13	19
Poland	20	5	0.551	247	136	111	—	—	—	—	—	0.450	9	0.467	30	14	16
Portugal	14	0	0.267	172	46	126	—	—	—	—	—	0.000	0	0.000	0	0	0
Qatar	2	0	0.000	0	0	0	2	0.500	12	6	6	0.000	0	0.000	0	0	0
Puerto Rico	4	0	0.000	12	0	12	3	0.222	18	4	14	0.000	0	0.000	0	0	0
Russia (Note: Russia's total includes appearances as Soviet Union and CIS.)	26	18	0.672	406	273	133	—	—	—	—	—	0.885	23	0.542	83	45	38
Serbia (Note: Serbia's total includes appearances as FR Yugoslavia and Serbia and Montenegro.)	20	11	0.625	277	173	104	—	—	—	—	—	0.650	13	0.509	53	27	26
Slovakia	4	0	0.389	18	7	11	2	0.375	16	6	10	0.000	0	0.000	0	0	0
Slovenia	2	0	0.889	9	8	1	1	0.833	6	5	1	0.000	0	0.000	0	0	0
South Korea	19	0	0.246	236	58	178	—	—	—	—	—	0.053	1	0.000	4	0	4
Spain	15	0	0.378	143	54	89	4	0.625	24	15	9	0.200	3	0.250	8	2	6
Chinese Taipei	2	0	0.000	0	0	0	2	0.500	12	6	6	0.000	0	0.000	0	0	0
Tunisia	4	0	0.000	0	0	0	4	0.375	24	9	15	0.000	0	0.000	0	0	0
Turkey	4	0	0.611	18	11	7	2	0.714	14	10	4	0.000	0	0.000	0	0	0
United States	20	7	0.577	272	157	115	—	—	—	—	—	0.550	11	0.444	36	16	20
Venezuela	9	0	0.194	72	14	58	3	0.389	18	7	11	0.000	0	0.000	0	0	0

0 defeats Titles	Brazil (1)
0 defeats IR (Note: It is worth mentioning that in season 1993 Italy had only 1 defeat in 20 matches, which is the only season that had as much matches in Intercontinental Round.)	Brazil (4), France (1), Poland (1), Russia (1)
0 defeats FR	Brazil (6), Cuba (1), Netherlands (1), Poland (1), Russia (1)
