= FIVB Volleyball World Grand Prix statistics =

The most successful teams, as of 2016, have been: Brazil, 11 times (1994, 1996, 1998, 2004, 2005, 2006, 2008, 2009, 2013, 2014, 2016); and United States, 6 times (1995, 2001, 2010, 2011, 2012, 2015). The competition has been won 3 times by Russia (1997, 1999, 2002), twice by Cuba (1993, 2000) and once by China (2003) and the Netherlands (2007).

Team	(Hong Kong); 1993 (8)	(China); 1994 (12)	(China); 1995 (8)	(China); 1996 (8)	(Japan); 1997 (8)	(Hong Kong); 1998 (8)	(China); 1999 (8)	(Philippines); 2000 (8)	(Macau); 2001 (8)	(Hong Kong); 2002 (8)	(Italy); 2003 (12)	(Italy); 2004 (12)	(Japan); 2005 (12)	(Italy); 2006 (12)	(China); 2007 (12)	(Japan); 2008 (12)	(Japan); 2009 (12)	(China); 2010 (12)	(Macau); 2011 (16)	(China); 2012 (16)	(Japan); 2013 (20)	(Japan); 2014 (28)	(United States); 2015 (28)	(Thailand); 2016 (28)	Total
Algeria	-	-	-	-	-	-	-	-	-	-	-	-	-	-	-	-	-	-	-	-	20th	28th	27th	28th	4
Argentina	-	-	-	-	-	-	-	-	-	-	-	-	-	-	-	-	-	-	14th	15th	16th	17th	19th	17th	6
Australia	-	-	-	-	-	-	-	-	-	-	-	-	-	-	-	-	-	-	-	-	-	27th	24th	27th	3
Azerbaijan	-	-	-	-	-	-	-	-	-	-	-	-	-	10th	-	-	-	-	-	-	-	-	-	-	1
Belgium	-	-	-	-	-	-	-	-	-	-	-	-	-	-	-	-	-	-	-	-	-	13th	10th	11th	3
Brazil	4th	1st	2nd	1st	-	1st	2nd	3rd	5th	4th	7th	1st	1st	1st	5th	1st	1st	2nd	2nd	2nd	1st	1st	3rd	1st	23
Bulgaria	-	-	-	-	-	-	-	-	-	-	-	-	-	-	-	-	-	-	-	-	9th	21st	17th	16th	4
Canada	-	-	-	-	-	-	-	-	-	-	11th	-	-	-	-	-	-	-	-	-	-	19th	18th	19th	4
China	2nd	3rd	4th	4th	5th	4th	3rd	4th	2nd	2nd	1st	5th	3rd	5th	2nd	5th	5th	4th	8th	5th	2nd	5th	4th	5th	24
Chinese Taipei	-	12th	-	-	-	-	-	-	-	-	-	-	-	-	12th	-	-	12th	-	16th	-	-	-	-	4
Colombia	-	-	-	-	-	-	-	-	-	-	-	-	-	-	-	-	-	-	-	-	-	-	23rd	24th	2
Croatia	-	-	-	-	-	-	-	-	-	-	-	-	-	-	-	-	-	-	-	-	-	23rd	20th	21st	3
Cuba	1st	2nd	3rd	2nd	2nd	3rd	5th	1st	4th	7th	11th	4th	4th	4th	7th	2nd	-	-	11th	6th	19th	20th	25th	25th	22
Czech Republic	-	-	-	-	-	-	-	-	-	-	-	-	-	-	-	-	-	-	-	-	14th	22nd	15th	18th	4
Dominican Republic	-	-	-	-	-	-	-	-	-	-	-	12th	11th	8th	11th	9th	11th	8th	12th	12th	10th	12th	12th	13th	13
Germany	8th	10th	8th	-	-	-	-	-	8th	3rd	7th	6th	10th	-	-	8th	3rd	9th	13th	7th	11th	10th	7th	12th	17
Italy	-	8th	-	-	6th	5th	4th	7th	-	-	5th	2nd	2nd	3rd	3rd	3rd	-	3rd	7th	10th	5th	9th	5th	8th	18
Japan	6th	4th	7th	8th	4th	7th	7th	8th	6th	5th	9th	9th	5th	6th	9th	6th	6th	5th	5th	9th	4th	2nd	6th	9th	24
Kazakhstan	-	-	-	-	-	-	-	-	-	-	-	-	-	-	10th	12th	-	-	15th	-	17th	24th	26th	22nd	7
Kenya	-	-	-	-	-	-	-	-	-	-	-	-	-	-	-	-	-	-	-	-	-	25th	21st	20th	3
Mexico	-	-	-	-	-	-	-	-	-	-	-	-	-	-	-	-	-	-	-	-	-	26th	28th	26th	3
Netherlands	-	9th	-	7th	7th	-	8th	-	-	-	4th	-	6th	-	1st	-	4th	7th	-	-	12th	14th	13th	3rd	13
Peru	-	11th	-	-	-	-	-	-	-	-	-	-	-	-	-	-	-	-	16th	-	-	18th	22nd	23rd	5
Poland	-	-	-	-	-	-	-	-	-	-	-	8th	7th	12th	6th	10th	7th	6th	10th	8th	15th	16th	14th	14th	13
Puerto Rico	-	-	-	-	-	-	-	-	-	-	-	-	-	-	-	-	10th	11th	-	13th	18th	15th	16th	15th	7
Russia	3rd	7th	6th	3rd	1st	2nd	1st	2nd	3rd	1st	2nd	7th	-	2nd	4th	-	2nd	-	4th	-	7th	3rd	2nd	4th	20
Serbia	-	-	-	-	-	-	-	-	-	-	-	-	-	-	-	-	-	-	3rd	11th	3rd	7th	8th	7th	6
South Korea	5th	5th	5th	6th	3rd	6th	6th	5th	7th	-	6th	11th	9th	9th	-	-	12th	-	9th	14th	-	8th	-	-	17
Thailand	-	-	-	-	-	-	-	-	-	8th	9th	10th	12th	11th	-	11th	8th	10th	6th	4th	13th	11th	9th	6th	14
Turkey	-	-	-	-	-	-	-	-	-	-	-	-	-	-	-	7th	-	-	-	3rd	8th	4th	11th	10th	6
United States	7th	6th	1st	5th	8th	8th	-	6th	1st	6th	3rd	3rd	8th	7th	8th	4th	9th	1st	1st	1st	6th	6th	1st	2nd	23
