= South American Beach Volleyball Circuit =

National team competition

The South American Beach Volleyball Circuit is a unisex sport competition for national teams in the sport of beach volleyball. The championship is held annually by the CSV (the South American volleyball federation) since 2005.

== Format ==
The circuit has used the same format since the 2005 edition, all twelve CSV affiliated federations can host a tournament in the circuit called "stop". Once the stops have been stablished, the other eleven federations can enter up to two teams in each stop, any federation can choose to send two teams, only one team or non at all in both female and male tournaments; after the eleven visiting federations have declared their teams, the host federation can 'fill' the tournament with country quotas until there are 16 or 24 teams entered.

Each stop of 16 has the teams divided into four pools with four teams each, each pool plays a round-robin and the top two move on to quarterfinals, then semifinals and the final game. Each stop of 24 has the teams divided into six pools of four, each pool plays a round-robin and the top two teams from each pool plus the 4 best third places move on to the round of 16, then quarterfinals, semifinals and the final game, however, never has a stop has had 24 teams entered.

After a stop, each federation is given a score based on its best team's final ranking. After all stops have ended, the federation with the most points is declared the champion.

== History ==
=== Men's tournament ===
| Year | Gold | Silver | Bronze |
|---|---|---|---|
| 2005-06; Details | Brazil | Uruguay | Argentina |
| 2006-07; Details | Brazil | Uruguay | Chile |
| 2007-08; Details | Argentina | Uruguay | Brazil |
| 2008-09; Details | Chile | Uruguay | Brazil |
| 2009-10 | Cancelled | | |
| 2011-12; Details | Brazil | Chile | Venezuela |
| 2012-13; Details | Brazil | Chile | Venezuela |
| 2013-14; Details | Brazil | Chile | Argentina |
| 2014-15 | Brazil | Venezuela | Chile |
| 2015-16 | Brazil | Argentina | Venezuela |
| 2016-17 | Brazil | Chile | Argentina |
| 2021-22 | - | - | - |

=== Women's tournament ===
| Year | Gold | Silver | Bronze |
|---|---|---|---|
| 2005-06; Details | Brazil | Uruguay | Paraguay |
| 2006-07; Details | Brazil | Uruguay | Argentina |
| 2007-08; Details | Brazil | Argentina | Uruguay |
| 2008-09; Details | Brazil | Colombia | Argentina |
| 2009-10 | Cancelled | | |
| 2011-12; Details | Brazil | Venezuela | Uruguay |
| 2012-13; Details | Brazil | Argentina | Chile |
| 2013-14; Details | Brazil | Argentina | Colombia |
| 2014-15 | Brazil | Venezuela | Argentina |
| 2015-16 | Brazil | Venezuela | Colombia |
| 2016-17 | Brazil | Argentina | Paraguay |
| 2021-22 | - | - | - |
