= FIVB Beach Volleyball U23 World Championships =

International beach volleyball tournament

The FIVB Beach Volleyball U23 World Championship is a double-gender international beach volleyball tournament for athletes under the age of 23. The competition first took place in Myslowice, Poland in 2013. Thirty-six teams per gender entered the competition, making 72 in total.

== Results summary ==
=== Men ===
Men's U23 World Championship
Year	Host	Champions	Runners-up	3rd place	4th place
2013; Details	(Poland); Myslowice	Piotr Kantor and Bartosz Łosiak (POL)	Vitor Felipe and Márcio Gaudie (BRA)	Lorenz Petutsching and Tobias Winter (AUT)	Rihard Finsters and Aleksandrs Solovejs (LAT)
2014; Details	(Poland); Myslowice	Maciej Kosiak and Maciej Rudol (POL)	Lars Tvinde and Hendrik Mol (NOR)	Allison Cittadin and Gustavo Carvalhaes (BRA)	Bennet Poniewaz and David Poniewaz (GER)

=== Women ===
Women's U23 World Championship
Year	Host	Champions	Runners-up	3rd place	4th place
2013; Details	(Poland); Myslowice	Victoria Bieneck and Isabell Schneider (GER)	Eduarda Lisboa and Thaís Ferreira (BRA)	Taylor Pischke and Melissa Humana-Paredes (CAN)	Eliška Gálová and Adéla Machová (CZE)
2014; Details	(Poland); Myslowice	Nicole Laird and Mariafe Artacho (AUS)	Lara Dykstra and Jace Pardon (USA)	Melissa Humana-Paredes and Taylor Pischke (CAN)	Taru Lahti and Anniina Parkkinen (FIN)

== Medals table ==
Rank	Nation	Gold	Silver	Bronze	Total
1	Poland	2	0	0	2
2	Australia	1	0	0	1
2	Germany	1	0	0	1
4	Brazil	0	2	1	3
5	Norway	0	1	0	1
5	United States	0	1	0	1
7	Canada	0	0	2	2
8	Austria	0	0	1	1
Totals (8 entries)		4	4	4	12
