= Ukrainian Women's Volleyball Super League =

National women's volleyball championship of Ukraine

- Current season, competition or edition: 2020–21 Ukrainian Women's Volleyball Super League
- Sport: Volleyball
- Founded: 1992
- Administrator: Ukrainian Volleyball Federation
- No. of teams: 8
- Country: Ukraine
- Most recent champion: Khimik Yuzhne
- Most titles: Khimik Yuzhne (8 titles)
- Level on pyramid: 1
- Relegation to: Premier League
- Domestic cup: Ukrainian Cup
- International cups: CEV Champions League; CEV Cup; CEV Challenge Cup
- Website: Ukrainian Volleyball Federation

The Ukrainian Women's Volleyball Super League (Ukrainian: Волейбольна Суперліга) is the highest professional women's volleyball league in Ukraine. It is organized and administrated by the Ukrainian Volleyball Federation (FVU).

== History ==
The dissolution of the Soviet Union in late 1991 brought an end to all sports leagues played in the Soviet Union, including the Soviet Women's Volleyball Championship, which existed since 1933. The then newly formed Ukrainian Volleyball Federation (FVU) created a national league in 1992 which was called the Premier League (Ukrainian: Волейбольна Вища ліга). In 2000, the name was changed to Super League with the second-tier league being renamed Premier League. There is a relegation and promotion system between the two leagues.

The best teams of the Super League are allocated places to compete in European club competition tournaments organized by the Confédération Européenne de Volleyball (CEV).

== Ukrainian women's volleyball champions ==
Year	Gold	Silver	Bronze
1992	Iskra Luhansk	Orbita Zaporizhzhia	Lokomotyv Dnipropetrovsk
1992–93	Orbita Zaporizhzhia	Iskra Luhansk	Krayan Odesa
1993–94	Iskra Luhansk	Orbita-ZAES Zaporizhzhia	AF Oleksandriya Bila Tserkva
1994–95	Iskra Luhansk	Orbita Zaporizhzhia	Dynamo-Jinestra Odesa
1995–96	Iskra Luhansk	Dynamo-Jinestra Odesa	Orbita-ZAES Zaporizhzhia
1996–97	Iskra Luhansk	Khimvolokno-Sporttekh Cherkasy	Dynamo-Jinestra Odesa
1997–98	Khimvolokno-Tryverton Cherkasy	Orbita Zaporizhzhia	Dynamo-Jinestra Odesa
1998–99	Iskra Luhansk	Khimvolokno-Kruh Cherkasy	Dynamo-Jinestra Odesa
1999–00	Khimvolokno-Kruh Cherkasy	Dynamo-Jinestra Odesa	Halychanka-Halexport Ternopil
2000–01	Dynamo-Jinestra Odesa	Dynamo-Kruh Cherkasy	Halychanka-Halexport Ternopil
2001–02	Dynamo-Jinestra Odesa	Dynamo-Kruh Cherkasy	ZDIA Zaporizhzhia
2002–03	Dynamo-Jinestra Odesa	ZDIA Zaporizhzhia	Kruh Cherkasy
2003–04	Dynamo-Jinestra Odesa	ZDIA Zaporizhzhia	Kruh Cherkasy
2004–05	Kruh Cherkasy	Jinestra Odesa	Khimvolokno Cherkasy
2005–06	Kruh Cherkasy	Halychanka-Halexport Ternopil	Severodonchanka Severodonetsk
2006–07	Kruh Cherkasy	Jinestra Odesa	Orbita-Universytet Zaporizhzhia
2007–08	Kruh Cherkasy	Jinestra Odesa	Halychanka-Halexport Ternopil
2008–09	Severodonchanka Severodonetsk	Kruh Cherkasy	Halychanka-Dynamo-TNEU Ternopil
2009–10	Halychanka-Dynamo-TNEU Ternopil	Jinestra Odesa	Kruh Cherkasy
2010–11	Khimik Yuzhne	Jinestra Odesa	Severodonchanka Severodonetsk
2011–12	Khimik Yuzhne	Volyn Lutsk	Severodonchanka Severodonetsk
2012–13	Khimik Yuzhne	Volyn Lutsk	Orbita-Universytet Zaporizhzhia
2013–14	Khimik Yuzhne	Severodonchanka Severodonetsk	Orbita-Universytet Zaporizhzhia
2014–15	Khimik Yuzhne	Severodonchanka Severodonetsk	Orbita-Universytet Zaporizhzhia
2015–16	Khimik Yuzhne	Orbita-Universytet Zaporizhzhia	Severodonchanka Severodonetsk
2016–17	Khimik Yuzhne	Bilozgar-MedUniversytet Vinnytsia	Volyn Universytet-Odyussh Lutsk
2017–18	Khimik Yuzhne	Volyn Universytet-Odyussh Lutsk	Halychanka-TNEU Gadz Ternopil
2018–19	Khimik Yuzhne	Orbita-Universytet Zaporizhzhia	Volyn Universytet-Odyussh Lutsk
2019–20	Prometey Kamianske	Khimik Yuzhne	Halychanka-TNEU Gadz Ternopil

== Performance by club ==
Team	Championships
Khimik Yuzhne	9
Iskra Luhansk	6
Kruh Cherkasy	6
Jinestra Odesa	4
Orbita-Universytet Zaporizhzhia	1
Severodonchanka Severodonetsk	1
Halychanka Ternopil	1
Prometey Kamianske	1

== See also ==
- Ukrainian Men's Volleyball Super League
