= FIVB Beach Volleyball U17 World Championships =

The FIVB Beach Volleyball U17 World Championship is a double-gender international beach volleyball tournament for athletes under the age of 17. The competition first took place in Acapulco, Mexico in 2014.

== Results summary ==
=== Men ===
Men's U17 World Championship
Year	Host	Champions	Runners-up	3rd place	4th place
2014	(Mexico); Acapulco	Florian Breer and Yves Haussener (SUI)	Alejandro Huerta and Óscar Jiménez (ESP)	Marc Darrieux and Timothée Platre (FRA)	Sharone Evans and Parvir Jhajj (CAN)

=== Women ===
Women's U17 World Championship
Year	Host	Champions	Runners-up	3rd place	4th place
2014	(Mexico); Acapulco	Morgan Martin and Kathryn Plummer (USA)	Joy Dennis and Haley Hallgren (USA)	Linda Gramberga and Tīna Graudiņa (LAT)	Duygu Nur Dogan and Pelin Ilgin (TUR)

== Medals table ==
Rank	Nation	Gold	Silver	Bronze	Total
1	United States	1	1	0	2
2	Switzerland	1	0	0	1
3	Spain	0	1	0	1
4	France	0	0	1	1
4	Latvia	0	0	1	1
Totals (5 entries)		2	2	2	6
