= 2024 Men's U22 European Volleyball Championship =

Tournament details
- Host country: Netherlands
- Dates: 9–14 July 2024
- Teams: 8

Final positions
- Champions: France (1st title)
- Runners-up: Italy
- Third place: Poland
- Fourth place: Netherlands

Tournament awards
- MVP: (France) Amir Tizi-Oualou

The 2024 Men's U22 European Volleyball Championship was the second edition of the men's U22 European Volleyball Championship, a biennial international volleyball tournament organized by the European Volleyball Confederation (CEV). The tournament was held in the Netherlands from 9 to 14 July 2024. France won their first title by beating Italy in the final.

== Qualification ==
Means of qualification		Qualifier
Host country		Netherlands
Qualification round	Pool A	Italy
Qualification round	Pool B	Spain
Qualification round	Pool C	Czech Republic
Qualification round	Pool D	Poland
Qualification round	Pool E	France
Qualification round	Best runners-up	Portugal
Qualification round	Best runners-up	Hungary

== Pools composition ==
The drawing of lots was held on 29 January 2024. The drawing of lots was combined with a seeding of National Federations and performed as follows:

1. Organiser, Netherlands, were seeded in Pool I
2. The highest ranked participating team from the CEV European Ranking, Italy, were seeded in Pool II
3. Remaining 6 participating teams drawn after they were previously placed in three cups as per their position in the latest European Ranking for U22 national teams (as of 26 January 2023)

Pot 1	Pot 2	Pot 3
Poland; France	Hungary; Portugal	Spain; Czech Republic

== Venues ==
Pool II, Final round		Pool I	
Apeldoorn	Apeldoorn is located in Netherlands	Groningen	Groningen is located in Netherlands
Omnisport Apeldoorn	Apeldoorn is located in Netherlands	MartiniPlaza	Groningen is located in Netherlands
Capacity: 5,000	Apeldoorn is located in Netherlands	Capacity: 4,500	Groningen is located in Netherlands

== Group stage ==
=== Pool I ===
Pos	Team	Pld	W	L	Pts	SW	SL	SR	SPW	SPL	SPR	Qualification
1	Poland	3	3	0	9	9	0	MAX	229	185	1.238	Semifinals
2	Netherlands	3	2	1	4	6	7	0.857	285	286	0.997	Semifinals
3	Hungary	3	1	2	4	5	6	0.833	225	250	0.900	
4	Spain	3	0	3	1	2	9	0.222	237	255	0.929	

Source: CEV.eu

Date	Time		Score		Set 1	Set 2	Set 3	Set 4	Set 5	Total	Report
9 July	16:30	Spain	0–3	Poland	23–25	23–25	20–25			66–75	Report
9 July	19:30	Netherlands	3–2	Hungary	25–27	25–16	25–15	27–25	19–17	121–100	Report
10 July	16:30	Poland	3–0	Hungary	25–15	25–14	25–21			75–50	Report
10 July	19:30	Spain	2–3	Netherlands	25–22	19–25	25–16	23–25	15–17	107–105	Report
11 July	16:30	Hungary	3–0	Spain	25–19	25–23	25–22			75–64	Report
11 July	19:30	Poland	3–0	Netherlands	27–25	29–19	27–25			83–69	Report

=== Pool II ===
Pos	Team	Pld	W	L	Pts	SW	SL	SR	SPW	SPL	SPR	Qualification
1	France	3	2	1	6	7	4	1.750	255	232	1.099	Semifinals
2	Italy	3	2	1	6	7	5	1.400	279	253	1.103	Semifinals
3	Portugal	3	2	1	5	7	6	1.167	285	283	1.007	
4	Czech Republic	3	0	3	1	3	9	0.333	231	282	0.819	

Source: CEV.eu

Date	Time		Score		Set 1	Set 2	Set 3	Set 4	Set 5	Total	Report
9 July	16:30	Italy	3–1	Czech Republic	25–19	25–18	23–25	25–18		98–80	Report
9 July	19:30	France	1–3	Portugal	25–18	21–25	22–25	22–25		90–93	Report
10 July	16:30	Czech Republic	2–3	Portugal	11–25	25–21	25–23	19–25	13–15	93–109	Report
10 July	19:30	Italy	1–3	France	25–15	20–25	21–25	15–25		81–90	Report
11 July	16:30	Czech Republic	0–3	France	18–25	20–25	20–25			58–75	Report
11 July	19:30	Portugal	1–3	Italy	17–25	27–25	18–25	21–25		83–100	Report

== Final round ==
Semifinals
13 July
Poland	1
Italy	3
13 July
France	3
Netherlands	0

Final
14 July
Italy	2
France	3
3rd place match
14 July
Poland	3
Netherlands	2

=== Semifinals ===
Date	Time		Score		Set 1	Set 2	Set 3	Set 4	Set 5	Total	Report
13 Jul	15:00	Poland	1–3	Italy	21–25	16–25	26–24	24–26		87–100	Report
13 Jul	18:00	France	3–0	Netherlands	25–18	25–20	25–23			75–61	Report

=== 3rd place match ===
Date	Time		Score		Set 1	Set 2	Set 3	Set 4	Set 5	Total	Report
14 Jul	15:00	Poland	3–2	Netherlands	21–25	22–25	25–15	25–21	19–9	112–95	Report

=== Final ===
Date	Time		Score		Set 1	Set 2	Set 3	Set 4	Set 5	Total	Report
14 Jul	18:00	Italy	2–3	France	19–25	20–25	25–14	30–28	20–22	114–114	Report

== Dream Team ==
- MVP
  (France) Amir Tizi-Oualou
- Best setter
  (France) Amir Tizi-Oualou
- Best outside spikers
  (France) Hilir Henno
  (France) Mathis Henno
- Best middle blockers
  (Poland) Jakub Majchrzak
  (Netherlands) Beau Wortelboer
- Best Opposite
  (Italy) Tommaso Barotto
- Best libero
  (Italy) Matteo Staforini

== Final standing ==
Rank	Team
1st place, gold medalist(s)	France
2nd place, silver medalist(s)	Italy
3rd place, bronze medalist(s)	Poland
4	Netherlands
5	Portugal
6	Hungary
7	Czech Republic
8	Spain
