= List of sports attendance figures =

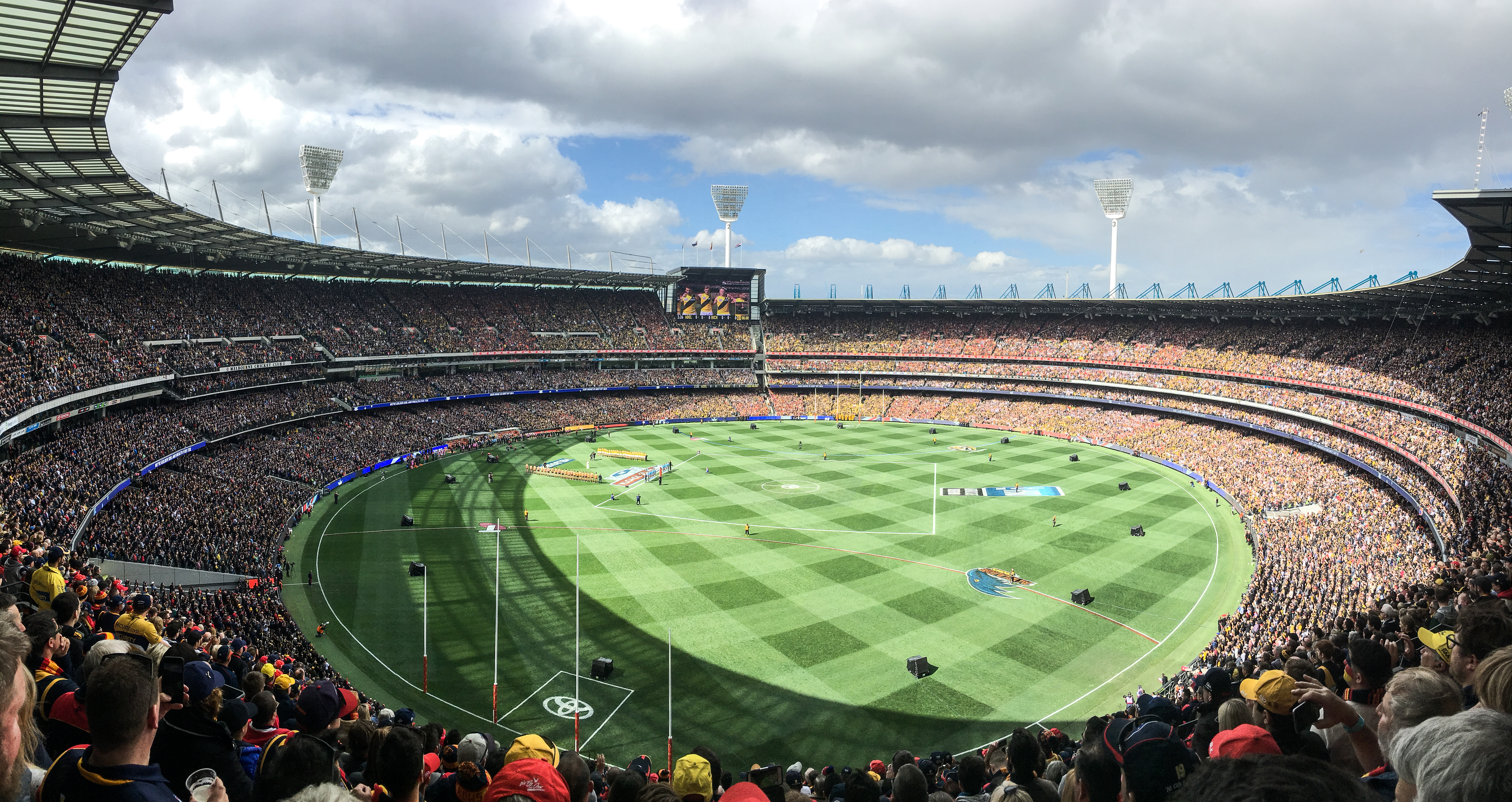
In Australian rules football, the AFL Grand Final, held annually at the Melbourne Cricket Ground, draws approximately 100,000 spectators, making it the world's highest attended league championship event.

This article lists the attendance of many sports competitions around the world, based in some cases on the number of tickets sold or given away, rather than people actually present. The list is almost exclusively stadium field and indoor arena ball sports. Top leagues in weekly attendance includes speedway sports.

All listed attendance figures reflect those for the most recent season or event for which:

- reliable attendance figures are available, and for UK Boxing events 2019.
- no artificial attendance restrictions (i.e., apart from venue capacity) were imposed during the relevant time frame—an entire season or a given event, as applicable.

== Sports leagues ==
=== Top leagues in average attendance ===
Below is a list of sports leagues by average attendance during its most recent season. The list is inclusive only of leagues with a total season attendance greater than 1,000,000 and an average attendance greater than 15,000 and excludes international competitions.

League	Sport	Country	Season	Teams	Games	Total attendance	Average attendance	Ref(s)
Formula One World Championship	Formula racing	International	2025	10	24	6,700,000	279,167	
National Football League	American football	United States	2025	32	272	18,781,145	69,048	
UEFA Champions League	Association football	Europe	2025–26	36	189	8,316,931	44,238	
Bundesliga	Association football	Germany	2025–26	18	306	12,687,072	42,431	
Indian Premier League	Cricket	India	2025	10	90	3,766,860	41,854	
Premier League	Association football	England	2025–26	20	380	15,505,486	41,569	
Australian Football League	Australian football	Australia	2025	18	216	8,257,027	38,227	
NCAA Division I FBS	American college football	United States	2025	136	816	32,841,048	35,360	
Nippon Professional Baseball	Baseball	Japan	2025	12	858	27,040,286	31,515	
La Liga	Association football	Spain	2025–26	20	380	11,759,006	30,944	
Serie A	Association football	Italy	2025–26	20	380	11,264,188	29,957	
Major League Baseball	Baseball	US and Canada	2025	30	2,430	71,409,522	29,387	
2. Bundesliga	Association football	Germany	2025–26	18	306	8,484,633	28,471	
Ligue 1	Association football	France	2025–26	18	306	8,136,214	27,394	
Campeonato Brasileiro Série A	Association football	Brazil	2025	20	380	9,964,214	26,222	
UEFA Europa League	Association football	Europe	2025–26	36	189	4,907,521	26,103	
Chinese Super League	Association football	China	2026	16	205	5,940,786	25,606	
Big Bash League	Cricket	Australia	2025–26	8	44	1,081,484	25,151	
DFB-Pokal	Association football	Germany	2025–26	64	63	1,503,250	23,861	
Canadian Football League	Canadian football	Canada	2025	9	81	1,858,266	22,941	
EFL Championship	Association football	England and Wales	2025–26	20	552	12,393,201	22,289	
Liga MX	Association football	Mexico	2025–26	18	306	7,163,659	22,247	
Major League Soccer	Association football	US and Canada	2025	30	510	11,200,000	21,988	
National Rugby League	Rugby league	Australia and New Zealand	2025	17	206	4,371,588	21,221	
J.League	Association football	Japan	2026	20	182	7,783,425	21,036	
Eredivisie	Association football	Netherlands	2025–26	18	306	6,041,461	19,615	
National Basketball Association	Basketball	US and Canada	2025–26	30	1,230	22,270,411	18,111	
Scottish Premiership	Association football	Scotland	2025–26	12	228	4,010,722	17,746	
National Hockey League	Ice hockey	US and Canada	2025–26	32	1,312	23,158,522	17,651	
Leagues Cup	Association football	Canada, Mexico and US	2025	36	62	1,046,629	17,157	
Top 14	Rugby Union	France	2025–26	14	188	3,212,877	17,090	
KBO League	Baseball	South Korea	2025	10	720	12,312,519	17,001	
European Rugby Champions Cup	Rugby union	Europe	2025–26	24	63	1,059,748	16,821	
All-Ireland Senior Football Championship	Gaelic Football	Ireland	2025	33	64	1,029,963	16,093	
FA Cup	Association football	England and Wales	2025–26	747	122	1,928,560	15,679	

=== Highest total league attendance in each sport ===
Sport	League	Country	Season	Games	Average attendance	Total attendance	Ref.
Baseball	Major League Baseball	United States and Canada	2025	2,430	29,387	71,409,522	
Ice hockey	National Hockey League	United States and Canada	2025–26	1,312	17,651	23,158,522	
Basketball	National Basketball Association	United States and Canada	2025–26	1,230	18,111	22,270,411	
American football	National Football League	United States	2025	272	69,048	18,781,145	
Association football	Premier League	England	2025–26	380	41,569	15,505,486	
Australian football	Australian Football League	Australia	2025	216	38,227	8,257,027	
Motor racing	Formula One World Championship	International	2025	24	279,167	6,700,000	
Rugby league	National Rugby League	Australia and New Zealand	2025	206	21,221	4,371,588	
Rugby union	Top 14	France	2025–26	188	17,090	3,212,877	
Canadian football	Canadian Football League	Canada	2025	81	22,941	1,858,266	
Handball	Handball-Bundesliga	Germany	2025–26	306	5,584	1,708,675	
Cricket	Big Bash League	Australia	2025–26	44	25,151	1,081,484	
Gaelic football	All-Ireland Senior Football Championship	Ireland	2025	64	16,093	1,029,963	
Box Lacrosse	National Lacrosse League	United States and Canada	2026	126	7,985	1,006,119	
Volleyball	Lega Pallavolo Serie A	Italy	2025–26	157	3,143	493,454	
Netball	Suncorp Super Netball	Australia	2026	59	6,277	370,354	
Bandy	Russian Bandy Super League	Russia	2025–26	169	2,126	359,298	
Pickleball	United Pickleball Association	United States	2024		3,000	320,000	
Hurling	Munster Senior Hurling Championship	Ireland	2026	11	29,059	319,646	
Indoor soccer	Major Arena Soccer League	United States	2025–26	96	2,879	276,430	
Pesäpallo	Superpesis	Finland	2023	182	1,381	251,385	
Field Lacrosse	Major League Lacrosse	United States and Canada			4,384	245,528	
Softball	National Pro Fastpitch	United States			1,127	135,331	

=== Top leagues in weekly attendance ===
Note that other ticketed activities in motor sports such as practices and qualifying are not included in the number of "games" in a week. Formula One attendance represents cumulative weekend attendance; in 2025, the highest race-day attendance was 168,000 at the British Grand Prix.

League	Sport	Country	Season	Teams	Games	Total attendance	Average attendance	Games / week (*)	Weekly attendance (*)
Tour de France	Cycling–Road	France	2014	22	21	12,000,000	571,429	7	4,000,003
Giro d'Italia	Cycling–Road	Italy	2014	22	21	11,800,000	561,905	7	3,933,335
Tour Down Under	Cycling–Road	Australia	2019	19	6	850,000	140,000	6	850,000
Vuelta a España	Cycling–Road	Spain	2014	22	21	2,500,000	119,048	7	833,336
Indian Premier League	Cricket	India	2008	8	59	3,422,347	61,113	7	427,793
Formula One World Championship	Motor racing	World	2024	10	20	6,530,000	272,083	1	272,083
Big Bash League	Cricket	Australia	2016–17	8	35	1,053,997	30,114	7	210,799
Major League Baseball	Baseball	United States / Canada	2017	30	2,419	72,670,423	30,042	7	210,294
Supercars Championship	Motor racing	Australia / New Zealand	2017	16	25	1,754,501	116,000	1	116,000
Nippon Professional Baseball	Baseball	Japan	2017	12	858	25,139,463	29,300	6	175,800
Bangladesh Premier League	Cricket	Bangladesh	2015	6	34	742,000	21,824	7	148,400
MotoGP	Motor racing	World	2014	16	18	2,473,624	137,423	1	137,423
NASCAR	Motor racing	United States	2013	19	36	3,594,708	99,853	1	99,853
Indy Car	Motor racing	United States / Canada / Japan	2009	13	17	1,555,772	91,516	1	91,516
KBO League	Baseball	South Korea	2024	10	720	10,887,705	15,122	6	90,732
National Basketball Association	Basketball	United States / Canada	2016–17	30	1,230	21,997,412	17,884	4	71,536
National Hockey League	Ice hockey	United States / Canada	2016–17	30	1,230	21,429,412	17,422	4	69,688
National Football League	American football	United States	2016	32	256	17,788,671	69,487	1	69,487
Mexican Pacific League	Baseball	Mexico	2016–17	8	268	2,625,495	9,797	6	58,782
International League (AAA)^{[I]}	Baseball	United States	2017	14	942	6,671,670	7,082	6	42,492
Bundesliga	Association football	Germany	2016–17	18	306	12,702,427	41,511	1	41,511
Indian Super League	Association football	India	2016	8	56	1,477,033	26,376	1.5	39,564
Pacific Coast League (AAA)^{[I]}	Baseball	United States	2017	16	1,092	7,150,468	6,548	6	39,288
Australian Football League	Australian rules football	Australia	2018	18	207	7,594,257	36,687	9	330,183
Premier League	Association football	England / Wales	2016–17	20	380	13,612,316	35,822	1	35,822
Super GT	Motor racing	Japan / Malaysia	2013	37	8	278,900	34,862	1	34,862
Liga Venezolana de Beisbol	Baseball	Venezuela	2016–17	8	247	1,275,317	5,163	6	30,978
Texas League	Baseball	United States	2017	8	540	2,727,350	5,051	6	30,306
Liga Mexicana de Béisbol	Baseball	Mexico	2017	16	824	4,042,605	4,906	6	29,436
La Liga	Association football	Spain	2016–17	20	380	10,470,781	27,700	1	27,700
Chinese Professional Baseball League	Baseball	Taiwan	2017	4	239	1,311,386	5,487	5	27,435

* Games in a week only by team

* Weekly attendance only by team

=== Top stadiums in total attendance in a calendar year (sports only) ===
Stadium	Sport(s)	Country	Season	Games	Average attendance	Total attendance	Ref.
Dodger Stadium	Baseball	United States	2025	81	49,537	4,012,470	
Yankee Stadium	Baseball/Association Football	United States	2025	97	38,760	3,759,706	
Melbourne Cricket Ground	Australian football/Cricket/Rugby league/Rugby Union	Australia	2025	62	58,465	3,624,811	
Petco Park	Baseball	United States	2025	81	42,435	3,437,201	
Citizens Bank Park	Baseball	United States	2025	81	41,672	3,375,477	
Citi Field	Baseball	United States	2025	80	39,775	3,182,052	
Wrigley Field	Baseball/Ice hockey	United States	2025	83	36,970	3,068,480	
Oracle Park	Baseball/Association Football	United States	2025	81	36,121	2,965,914	
Tokyo Dome	Baseball	Japan	2025	73	39,833	2,907,782	
Truist Park	Baseball	United States	2025	81	35,842	2,903,167	
Rogers Centre	Baseball	Canada	2025	81	35,184	2,849,935	
Koshien Stadium	Baseball	Japan	2025	71	41,724	2,823,050	

== Top leagues in recent domestic club championship event attendance ==
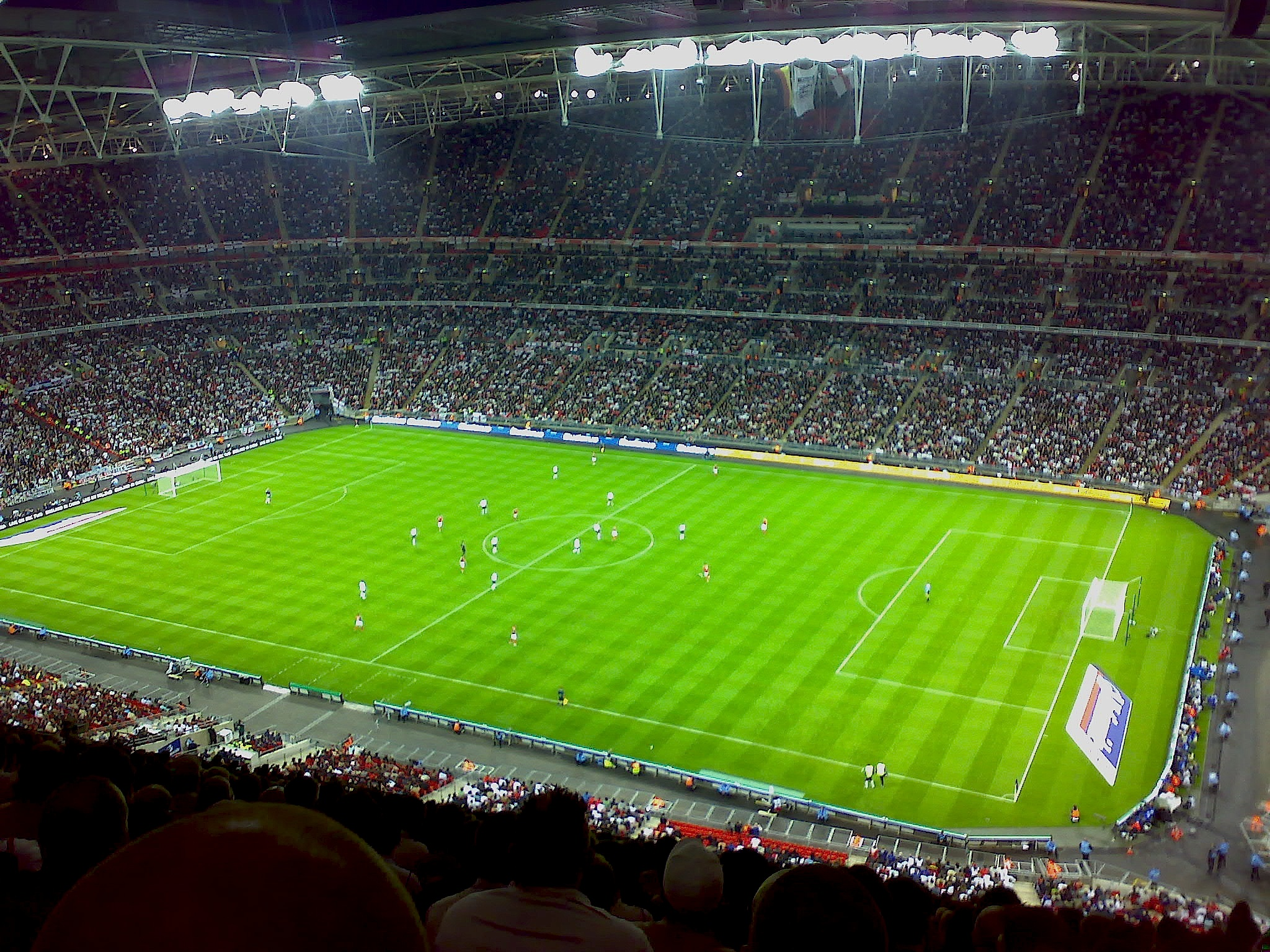
The Wembley Stadium in the United Kingdom.

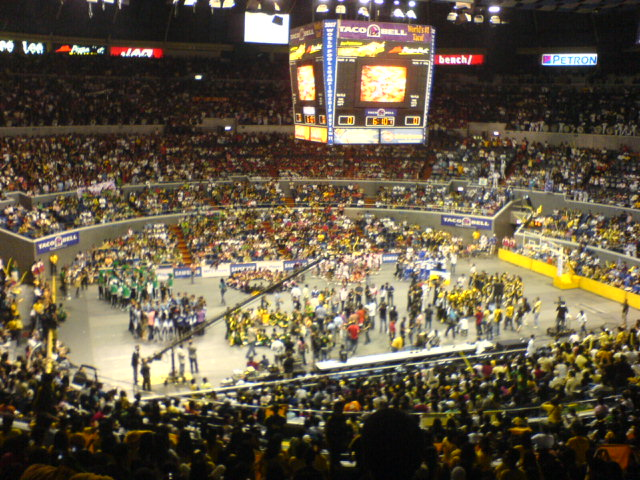
The annual UAAP Cheerdance Competition routinely sells out the Smart Araneta Coliseum, one of Southeast Asia's largest indoor arenas.

This section lists the most recent attendances at annual championship events (single decider matches or the final match in a best-of series only) by total attendance; however, be advised that figures affected by the COVID-19 pandemic have not been included. It also includes domestic leagues and competitions. Additionally, it includes the finals of top-level promotion playoffs, in which teams play to determine potential or confirmed promotion to a country's top league level in the next season. The listed crowd figures are often a reflection of a championship venue's capacity, as demand for these events is generally so high that any stadium or arena would be filled to capacity.

For the purposes of this table, "domestic" is defined to include leagues which are historically focused in one country, but may have teams in one or more nearby countries.

The EuroLeague in basketball is transnational in that it includes teams from multiple European countries, but is domestic in the sense of being a championship for the single entity of Europe. It is governed by Euroleague Basketball, an explicitly pan-European body that is independent of the continental governing body of FIBA Europe.

This contrasts with leagues such as Super Rugby and the URC, which operate in multiple countries with more than one team in most (Super Rugby) or all (URC) of their participating countries, and also make no pretense of being a championship for a continental-size region.

Event	Sport	Country	Competition	Crowd	Year	Venue	City	Ref
Indian Premier League final	Cricket	India	Indian Premier League	104,859	2022	Narendra Modi Stadium	Ahmedabad	
AFL Grand Final	Australian rules football	Australia	Australian Football League	100,024	2023	Melbourne Cricket Ground	Melbourne	
EFL Cup Final	Association football	England	EFL Cup	87,306	2023	Wembley Stadium	London	
EFL Championship Play-off Final	Association football	England	EFL Championship	85,711	2023	Wembley Stadium	London	
FA Cup Final	Association football	England	FA Cup	84,897	2022	Wembley Stadium	London	
NRL Grand Final	Rugby league	Australia	National Rugby League	82,415	2022	Stadium Australia	Sydney	
All-Ireland Senior Football Championship Final	Gaelic football	Ireland	All-Ireland Senior Football Championship	82,298	2022	Croke Park	Dublin	
All-Ireland Senior Hurling Championship Final	Hurling	Ireland	All-Ireland Senior Hurling Championship	82,287	2022	Croke Park	Dublin	
Gallagher Premiership Final	Rugby union	England	Gallagher Premiership	81,688	2025	Twickenham	London	
Top 14 Final	Rugby union	France	Top 14	79,786	2019	Stade de France	Saint-Denis	
EFL Trophy Final	Association football	England	EFL Trophy	79,389	2023	Wembley Stadium	London	
Coupe de France Final	Association football	France	Coupe de France	78,038	2023	Stade de France	Saint-Denis	
Women's FA Cup Final	Women's association football	England	Women's FA Cup	77,390	2023	Wembley Stadium	London	
SEC Championship Game	American football	United States	Southeastern Conference football	74,810	2022	Mercedes-Benz Stadium	Atlanta	
DFB-Pokal Final	Association football	Germany	DFB-Pokal	74,322	2022	Olympiastadion	Berlin	
FA Community Shield	Association football	England	FA Community Shield	72,724	2018	Wembley Stadium	London	
College Football Playoff National Championship	American football	United States	College Football Playoff	72,628	2023	SoFi Stadium	Inglewood	
NCAA Division I Men's Basketball Championship	Basketball	United States	NCAA Division I basketball	72,423	2023	NRG Stadium	Houston	
Big 12 Championship Game	American football	United States	Big 12 Conference football	69,335	2022	AT&T Stadium	Arlington	
Coppa Italia Final	Association football	Italy	Coppa Italia	67,944	2022	Stadio Olimpico	Rome	
Super Bowl	American football	United States	NFL	67,827	2023	State Farm Stadium	Glendale	
Big Ten Championship Game	American football	United States	Big Ten Conference football	67,107	2022	Lucas Oil Stadium	Indianapolis	
Campeonato Carioca Final second leg	Association football	Brazil	Campeonato Carioca	66,969	2023	Estádio do Maracanã	Rio de Janeiro	
ACC Championship Game	American football	United States	Atlantic Coast Conference football	64,115	2022	Bank of America Stadium	Charlotte	
Copa do Brasil Final	Association football	Brazil	Copa do Brasil	63,077	2023	Estádio do Morumbi	São Paulo	
King Pro League Grand Finals Championship Match	Esports (Honor of Kings)	China	King Pro League	62,196	2025	Beijing National Stadium	Beijing	
Super League Grand Final	Rugby league	England	Super League	60,783	2022	Old Trafford	Manchester	
Copa do Nordeste Final	Association football	Brazil	Copa do Nordeste	60,045	2022	Arena Castelão	Fortaleza	
Leinster Senior Hurling Championship Final	Hurling	Ireland	Leinster Senior Hurling Championship	60,032	2017	Croke Park	Dublin	
Liga MX Femenil Clausura Liguilla Final second leg	Women's association football	Mexico	Liga MX Femenil	58,156	2023	Estadio Azteca	Mexico City	
All-Ireland Ladies' Football Championship final	Ladies' Gaelic Football	Ireland	All-Ireland Senior Ladies' Football Championship	56,114	2017	Croke Park	Dublin	
Campeonato Mineiro Final second leg	Association football	Brazil	Campeonato Mineiro	55,989	2023	Mineirão	Belo Horizonte	
PBA Commissioner's Cup Finals Game 7	Basketball	Philippines	Philippine Basketball Association	54,589	2023	Philippine Arena	Bocaue	
World Series Game 5	Baseball	United States	Major League Baseball	54,367	2018	Dodger Stadium	Los Angeles	
Big Bash League Final	Cricket	Australia	Big Bash League	53,886	2023	Perth Stadium	Perth	
Copa del Rey Final	Association football	Spain	Copa del Rey	53,698	2019	Estadio Benito Villamarín	Seville	
Challenge Cup Final	Rugby league	England	Challenge Cup	51,628	2022	Tottenham Hotspur Stadium	London	
Scottish Cup Final	Association football	Scotland	Scottish Cup	51,254	2013	Hampden Park	Glasgow	
NRL Women's Grand Final	Rugby league football	Australia	NRL Women's	46,288	2025	Stadium Australia	Sydney	
Munster Senior Hurling Championship Final	Hurling	Ireland	Munster Senior Hurling Championship	45,558	2017	Semple Stadium	Thurles	
American Athletic Conference Championship Game	American football	United States	American Athletic Conference football	45,176	2018	Spectrum Stadium	Orlando	
Big Bash League Final	Cricket	Australia	Big Bash League	43,153	2024	Sydney Cricket Ground	Sydney	
Brazilian Women's Championship Final second leg	Association football	Brazil	Campeonato Brasileiro de Futebol Feminino Série A1	42,556	2023	Neo Química Arena	São Paulo	
Campeonato Paulista Final	Association football	Brazil	Campeonato Paulista	41,444	2023	Allianz Parque	São Paulo	
Swedish Bandy Championship Final	Bandy	Sweden	Elitserien	38,474	2013	Friends Arena	Solna/Stockholm	
Colombian Women's Football League Final	Women's association football	Colombia	Colombian Women's Football League	37,100	2022	Estadio Olímpico Pascual Guerrero	Cali	
Danish Handball League Playoff final	Handball	Denmark	Danish Handball League	36,551	2011	Parken Stadium (Note: Parken Stadium is a retractable-roof stadium used primarily for association football and music events.)	Copenhagen	
Pac-12 Championship Game	American football	United States	Pac-12 Conference football	35,134	2018	Levi's Stadium	Santa Clara	
Currie Cup Final	Rugby union	South Africa	Currie Cup	33,804	2023	Free State Stadium	Bloemfontein	
Grey Cup	Canadian football	Canada	Canadian Football League	33,350	2022	Mosaic Stadium	Regina	
Pakistan Super League Final	Cricket	Pakistan	Pakistan Super League	32,000	2018	National Stadium	Karachi	
NCAA Division I Men's Lacrosse Championship Final	Lacrosse	United States	NCAA Division I men's lacrosse	31,528	2019	Lincoln Financial Field	Philadelphia	
Japan Series Game 6	Baseball	Japan	Nippon Professional Baseball	30,723	2018	Mazda Stadium	Hiroshima	
Walsh Cup Final	Hurling	Ireland	Walsh Cup	30,107	2016	Croke Park	Dublin	
SANFL Grand Final	Australian rules football	Australia	South Australian National Football League	27,479	2022	Adelaide Oval	Adelaide	
Norwegian Cup Final	Association football	Norway	Norwegian Football Cup	26,582	2014	Ullevaal Stadion	Oslo	
A-League Men Grand Final	Association football	Australia	A-League Men	26,523	2023	CommBank Stadium	Sydney	
UAAP Cheerdance Competition	Cheerleading	Philippines	UAAP	25,388	2015	SM Mall of Asia Arena	Pasay	
UAAP Men's Basketball Finals Game 3	Basketball	Philippines	UAAP basketball	25,248	2024	Araneta Coliseum	Quezon City	
Korean Series Game 5	Baseball	South Korea	KBO League	25,000	2015	Jamsil Baseball Stadium	Seoul	
Premier Volleyball League All-Filipino Conference	Volleyball	Philippines	Premier Volleyball League	24,459	2023	Araneta Coliseum	Quezon City	
NCAA Men's Basketball Finals Game 3	Basketball	Philippines	NCAA (Philippines) men's basketball	23,077	2023	Araneta Coliseum	Quezon City	
Mountain West Conference Football Championship Game	American football	United States	Mountain West Conference football	23,662	2018	Albertsons Stadium	Boise	
UAAP Women's Volleyball Finals Game 3	Volleyball	Philippines	UAAP volleyball	22,858	2016	SM Mall of Asia Arena	Pasay	
MLS Cup	Association football	United States	Major League Soccer	22,384	2022	Banc of California Stadium	Los Angeles	
National Hurling League Final	Hurling	Ireland	National Hurling League	21,601	2014	Semple Stadium	Thurles	
PBA Governor's Cup Finals Game 6	Basketball	Philippines	Philippine Basketball Association	20,224	2021	SM Mall of Asia Arena	Pasay	
College World Series Championship Series, Game 3	Baseball	United States	NCAA Division I baseball	20,007	2019	TD Ameritrade Park	Omaha	
Taiwan Series Game 7	Baseball	Taiwan	Chinese Professional Baseball League	20,000	2015	Taoyuan International Baseball Stadium	Taoyuan City	
Big East men's basketball tournament championship game	Basketball	United States	Big East Conference men's basketball	19,812	2023	Madison Square Garden	New York City	
ACC men's basketball tournament championship game	Basketball	United States	Atlantic Coast Conference men's basketball	19,691	2019	Spectrum Center	Charlotte	
NBA Finals Game 5	Basketball	United States	NBA	19,537	2023	Ball Arena	Denver	
NCAA Division I Women's Basketball Championship	Basketball	United States	NCAA Division I basketball	19,482	2023	American Airlines Center	Dallas	
SEC men's basketball tournament championship game	Basketball	United States	Southeastern Conference men's basketball	19,452	2019	Bridgestone Arena	Nashville	
Big 12 men's basketball tournament championship game	Basketball	United States	Big 12 Conference men's basketball	19,066	2019	Sprint Center	Kansas City	
NHL Stanley Cup Final Game 5	Ice hockey	United States	NHL	19,038	2023	T-Mobile Arena	Las Vegas	
FA Women's League Cup Final	Women's association football	England	Women's Super League	19,010	2023	Selhurst Park	Selhurst	
NCAA Division I Wrestling Championship	Collegiate wrestling	United States	NCAA	18,957 (Note: This number is the average attendance per session. The NCAA Division I wrestling championship finals are contested in six sessions over three days, with separate ticketing for each session. The total attendance for the entire tournament was 113,743.)	2018	Quicken Loans Arena	Cleveland	
DEL Finals Game 7	Ice hockey	Germany	DEL	18,666	2014	Lanxess Arena	Cologne	
Big Ten Conference men's basketball tournament championship game	Basketball	United States	Big Ten Conference men's basketball	18,615	2019	United Center	Chicago	
NCAA Division I Football Championship (Note: This is the championship event for the second level of NCAA college football, Division I FCS. The current championship event in Division I FBS, the College Football Playoff, is not operated by the NCAA. The NCAA does not award an official FBS championship, although it maintains lists of champions recognized by various third parties in its record books.)	American football	United States	NCAA (FCS)	17,802	2019	Toyota Stadium	Frisco	
National Women's Soccer League Championship	Women's association football	United States	National Women's Soccer League	17,624	2022	Audi Field	Washington	
Mexican Pacific League Serie Final Game 5	Baseball	Mexico	Mexican Pacific League	16,890	2014–15	Estadio General Ángel Flores	Culiacán	
WNBA Finals Game 4	Basketball	United States	WNBA	16,851	2023	Barclays Center	New York City	
Conference USA Football Championship Game	American football	United States	Conference USA football	15,806	2018	Floyd Stadium	Murfreesboro	
Novo Basquete Brasil Final	Basketball	Brazil	NBB	15,449	2014	HSBC Arena	Rio de Janeiro	
PBA Philippine Cup Finals Game 7	Basketball	Philippines	Philippine Basketball Association	15,195	2022–23	Araneta Coliseum	Quezon City	
Champion's Cup Final Game 2	Indoor lacrosse	Canada	NLL	15,182	2016	SaskTel Centre	Saskatoon	
Sun Belt Conference Football Championship Game	American football	United States	Sun Belt Conference football	14,963	2018	Kidd Brewer Stadium	Boone	
British Basketball League Play-off Final Game 5	Basketball	United Kingdom	British Basketball League	14,700	2014–15	The O2 Arena	London	
Superliga Final	Volleyball	Brazil	Superliga	14,000	2014	Mineirinho	Belo Horizonte	
Super Netball Final	Netball	Australia	Super Netball	13,722	2018	Perth Arena	Perth	
NCAA Division I Men's Ice Hockey Championship Game	Ice hockey	United States	NCAA ice hockey	13,624	2019	KeyBank Center	Buffalo	
LVBP Serie Final Game 4	Baseball	Venezuela	Liga Venezolana de Beisbol Profesional	13,219	2014–15	Estadio José Bernardo Pérez	Valencia	
AFL Women's Grand Final	Australian rules football	Australia	AFL Women's	12,741	2025	Princes Park (stadium)	Melbourne	
Serie A Finals Game 7	Basketball	Italy	Lega Basket Serie A	12,331	2014	Mediolanum Forum	Milan	
Women's College World Series Championship Series, Game 2	Softball	United States	NCAA Division I softball	12,257	2022	USA Softball Hall of Fame Stadium	Oklahoma City	
SEC women's basketball tournament championship game	Basketball	United States	Southeastern Conference women's basketball	12,203	2023	Bon Secours Wellness Arena	Greenville	
LBPPR Serie Final Game 6	Baseball	Puerto Rico	Liga de Béisbol Profesional Roberto Clemente	12,000	2014–15	Hiram Bithorn Stadium	San Juan, Puerto Rico	
Indian Super League Final	Association football	India	Indian Super League	11,879	2023	Fatorda Stadium	Margao	
EuroLeague Final	Basketball	Europe	EuroLeague	11,066	2023	Žalgirio Arena	Kaunas	
Copa del Rey de Baloncesto Final	Basketball	Spain	Liga ACB	11,000	2014	Martín Carpena	Málaga	
Lietuvos krepšinio lyga Finals Game 5	Basketball	Lithuania	LKL	10,679	2018	Žalgirio Arena	Kaunas	
Ohio Valley Conference men's basketball tournament championship game	Basketball	United States	Ohio Valley Conference men's basketball	10,525	2019	Ford Center	Evansville	
NBL Grand Final Game 5	Basketball	Australia	NBL	10,300	2018	Melbourne Arena	Melbourne	
MAC Championship Game	American football	United States	Mid-American Conference football	10,255	2018	Ford Field	Detroit	
LIDOM Serie Final Game 6	Baseball	Dominican Republic	Dominican Professional Baseball League	10,012	2014–15	Estadio Julián Javier	San Francisco de Macorís	
Women's College Cup Championship Game	Association football	United States	NCAA Division I women's soccer	9,531	2022	WakeMed Soccer Park	Cary	
A-League Women Grand Final	Women's association football	Australia	A-League Women	9,519	2023	CommBank Stadium	Sydney	
Triple-A Baseball National Championship Game	Baseball	United States	Minor League Baseball	9,471	2016	AutoZone Park	Memphis	
Copa de la Reina de Fútbol Final	Women's association football	Spain	Copa de la Reina de Fútbol	9,217	2023	Estadio Municipal de Butarque	Leganés	
Mountain West Conference men's basketball tournament championship game	Basketball	United States	Mountain West Conference men's basketball	8,969	2019	Thomas & Mack Center	Las Vegas	
Calder Cup Finals Game 6	Ice hockey	United States	AHL	8,324	2025	Bojangles Coliseum	Charlotte	
Lithuanian Football Cup Final	Association football	Lithuania	Lithuanian Football Cup	8,764	2023	Darius and Girėnas Stadium	Kaunas	
Supercopa de España de Baloncesto Final	Basketball	Spain	Liga ACB	8,217	2013	Fernando Buesa Arena	Vitoria-Gasteiz	
Missouri Valley Conference men's basketball tournament championship game	Basketball	United States	Missouri Valley Conference men's basketball	8,108	2019	Enterprise Center	St. Louis	
Colonial Athletic Association men's basketball tournament championship game	Basketball	United States	Colonial Athletic Association men's basketball	7,945	2018	North Charleston Coliseum	North Charleston	
SHL Finals Game 4	Ice hockey	Sweden	SHL	7,843	2014	Löfbergs Arena	Karlstad	
MAC men's basketball tournament championship game	Basketball	United States	Mid-American Conference men's basketball	7,813	2019	Quicken Loans Arena	Cleveland	
West Coast Conference men's basketball tournament championship game	Basketball	United States	West Coast Conference men's basketball	7,771	2019	Orleans Arena	Las Vegas	
Atlantic 10 men's basketball tournament championship game	Basketball	United States	Atlantic 10 Conference men's basketball	7,643	2018	Capital One Arena	Washington	
NLA Finals Game 4	Ice hockey	Switzerland	NLA	7,624	2014	Kolping Arena	Kloten	
Horizon League men's basketball tournament championship game	Basketball	United States	Horizon League men's basketball	7,595	2018	Little Caesars Arena	Detroit	
Liga ACB Finals Game 4	Basketball	Spain	Liga ACB	7,301	2019	Palau Blaugrana	Barcelona	
Super League XX Super 8s Million Pound Game	Rugby league	England	Super League	7,246	2015	Belle Vue	Wakefield	
American Athletic Conference men's basketball tournament championship game	Basketball	United States	American Athletic Conference men's basketball	7,223	2019	FedExForum	Memphis	
Queensland Cup Grand Final	Rugby league	Australia	Queensland Cup	7,135	2014	Lang Park	Brisbane	
Extraliga Finals Game 5	Ice hockey	Czech Republic	Czech Extraliga	7,000	2014	Luďka Čajky	Zlín	
NCAA Division I Women's Lacrosse Championship Final	Lacrosse	United States	NCAA Division I women's lacrosse	6,705	2023	WakeMed Soccer Park	Cary	
Liiga Finals Game 7	Ice hockey	Finland	Liiga	6,614	2014	Oulun Energia Areena	Oulu	
Basketball Bundesliga Finals Game 5	Basketball	Germany	Basketball Bundesliga	6,500	2018	Audi Dome	Munich	
USL W League Championship	Women's association football	United States	USL W League	6,489	2022	TCO Stadium	Eagan	
MISL Finals Mini-Game Tie Breaker	Indoor soccer	United States	MISL	6,447	2014	Baltimore Arena	Baltimore	
Southern Conference men's basketball tournament championship game	Basketball	United States	Southern Conference men's basketball	6,400	2019	U.S. Cellular Center	Asheville	
Women's Superliga Final	Volleyball	Brazil	Women's Superliga	6,240	2023	Ginásio Municipal Tancredo Neves	Uberlândia	
Summit League women's basketball tournament championship game	Basketball	United States	Summit League women's basketball	6,002	2023	Denny Sanford Premier Center	Sioux Falls	
American Athletic Conference women's basketball tournament championship game	Basketball	United States	American Athletic Conference women's basketball	5,945	2023	Dickies Arena	Fort Worth	
West Coast Conference women's basketball tournament championship game	Basketball	United States	West Coast Conference women's basketball	5,892	2019	Orleans Arena	Las Vegas	
Serie del Rey Game 5	Baseball	Mexico	Liga Mexicana de Béisbol	5,853	2015	Estadio Monclova	Monclova	
ASUN men's basketball tournament championship game	Basketball	United States	ASUN Conference men's basketball	5,607	2019	Allen Arena	Nashville	
Gagarin Cup Finals Game 4	Ice hockey	Russia	KHL	5,543	2019	Balashikha Arena	Balashikha	
Serie A1 Finals Game 4	Volleyball	Italy	Serie A1	5,187	2014	PalaEvangelisti	Perugia	
A-1 Liga Finals Game 4	Basketball	Croatia	A-1 Liga	5,000	2012–13	Dražen Petrović Basketball Hall	Zagreb	
Men's College Cup Championship Game	Association football	United States	NCAA Division I men's soccer	4,858	2018	Harder Stadium	Santa Barbara	
CollegeInsider.com Postseason Tournament Championship Game	Basketball	United States	CollegeInsider.com Postseason Tournament	4,549	2015	Ford Center	Evansville	
VTB United League Finals Game 3	Basketball	Russia	VTB United League	4,505	2014	USK CSKA	Moscow	
College Basketball Invitational Finals Game 3	Basketball	United States	College Basketball Invitational	4,460	2015	Fant–Ewing Coliseum	Monroe	
Summit League men's basketball tournament championship game	Basketball	United States	Summit League men's basketball	4,076	2019	Denny Sanford Premier Center	Sioux Falls	
National Invitation Tournament Final	Basketball	United States	NIT	4,051	2019	Madison Square Garden	New York City	
Conference USA men's basketball tournament championship game	Basketball	United States	Conference USA men's basketball	3,956	2017	Legacy Arena at BJCC	Birmingham	
National Collegiate Women's Ice Hockey Championship Game	Ice hockey	United States	NCAA ice hockey	3,940	2023	AMSOIL Arena	Duluth	
MAAC men's basketball tournament championship game	Basketball	United States	Metro Atlantic Athletic Conference men's basketball	3,329	2018	Times Union Center	Albany	
Slovenian Basketball League Finals Game 4	Basketball	Slovenia	Slovenian Basketball League	3,300	2012–13	Arena Stožice	Ljubljana	
Southland Conference men's basketball tournament championship game	Basketball	United States	Southland Conference men's basketball	3,279	2018	Leonard E. Merrell Center	Katy	
America East men's basketball tournament championship game	Basketball	United States	America East Conference men's basketball	3,266	2018	Patrick Gym	Burlington	
NBA G League Finals, Game 3	Basketball	United States/Canada	NBA G League	2,783	2018–19	Island Federal Credit Union Arena	Stony Brook	
Big South Conference men's basketball tournament championship game	Basketball	United States	Big South Conference men's basketball	2,772	2019	Dedmon Center	Radford	
Northeast Conference men's basketball tournament championship game	Basketball	United States	Northeast Conference men's basketball	2,610	2019	DeGol Arena	Loretto	
Australian Baseball League Championship series Game 2	Baseball	Australia	Australian Baseball League	2,043	2013	Narrabundah Ballpark	Canberra	
Serie A1 Italian Baseball series Game 4	Baseball	Italy	Italian Baseball League	2,000	2015	Stadio dei Pirati	Rimini	

== Semi-professional and amateur leagues ==
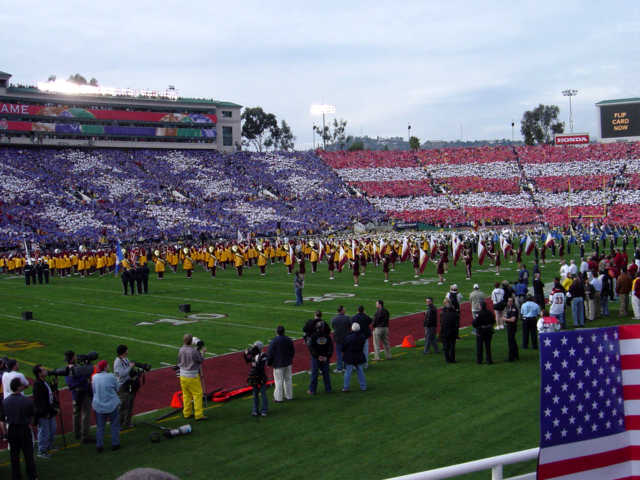
View of the crowd at the 2004 Rose Bowl College Football Game

This section lists college and amateur leagues by total attendance. Remaining amateurism requirements in the majority of top-level sports were dropped in the late 20th century, and there are now only a few amateur leagues which are of interest to a wide public. In the United States, college sports are very popular and at least one significant ice hockey league retains an amateur requirement. In Ireland, the All-Ireland senior championships in Gaelic football and hurling, both operated by the Gaelic Athletic Association, which continues to prohibit professionalism, each draw over 80,000 to fill Croke Park for the respective finals.

The NCAA championships listed here are all composed of several separate conferences with varying attendance levels. For example, in American football, per-game home attendances for the highest level of competition, Division I FBS, in the 2018 season ranged from 15,458 for Mid-American Conference teams to 73,994 for Southeastern Conference teams. (Note: This includes all regular-season games, bowl games for FBS teams, and playoff games and other postseason games in FCS and lower divisions. It does not include postseason all-star games.) NCAA Division I FBS football has the 2nd highest average attendance worldwide for any league-wide sport (behind the National Football League) and the 2nd highest overall attendance worldwide (behind Major League Baseball). For college baseball, Dudy Noble Field, Polk-DeMent Stadium at Mississippi State University holds the on-campus attendance record at 15,586 and all of college baseball's Top 11 on-campus largest crowds.

League	Sport	Country	Season	Games	Total attendance	Average attendance	Source
NCAA Division I FBS football	College American football	United States	2018	877	36,707,511	41,856	
All-Ireland Senior Hurling Championship	Hurling	Ireland	2017	12	348,905	29,075	
All-Ireland Senior Football Championship	Gaelic football	Ireland	2017	33	628,818	19,055	
Japanese High School Baseball Championship	Amateur Baseball	Japan	2018	55	1,015,000	18,455 (63,437 in per a single day)	
NCAA Division I FCS football	College American football	United States	2018	669	5,253,371	7,853	
Cuban National Series	Baseball	Cuba	2006–07	720	4,759,200	6,610	
Varsity Cup	Varsity Rugby	South Africa	2011	31	178,622	5,762	
NCAA Division I men's basketball	College basketball	United States	2017–18	5,772 (Note: The actual number of games is slightly greater than the cited figure. In most postseason tournaments, as well as some special events during the regular season, tickets are sold for "sessions" instead of games. For example, in the 67-game NCAA men's tournament, tickets are sold for 36 sessions. All NCAA tournament sessions consist of two games, except for the four regional finals and the national championship game; a single ticket admits the holder to both games of a two-game session.)	27,977,164 (Note: This figure covers all games, including the NCAA tournament and other postseason tournaments.)	4,807	
NCAA Division I men's hockey	Ice hockey	United States	2011–12	1,018	3,696,831	3,631	(Note: This figure includes only regular-season home games for each team. It includes special outdoor events, but does not include neutral-site games, conference tournaments, or the NCAA tournament.)
U Sports football	College Canadian football	Canada	2016	108	357,081	3,347	
NCAA Division I women's basketball	College basketball	United States	2021–22	5,106	6,927,901	1,358	

== Representative matches ==
This list covers special annual matches for representative sides that are not covered elsewhere by international or domestic fixtures. They include state or regional matches, annual commemorative games and publicly voted all-star selections. This type of event is unknown within European nations, except in basketball; many European domestic leagues in that sport hold an all-star game at roughly the midpoint of the regular season.

Tournament	Sport	Country	Season	Teams	Games	Total attendance	Average attendance	Stadium(s)	Ref(s)
State of Origin	Rugby league	Australia	2024	2	3	219,755	73,252	Lang Park, Brisbane; Melbourne Cricket Ground, Melbourne; Stadium Australia, Sydney	
A-Leagues All Stars	Association football	Australia	2022	2 (Note: Since the game's inception in 2013, it has featured an A-League all stars team against a visiting foreign club.)	1	70,174	70,174	Stadium Australia, Sydney	
NFL Pro Bowl	American football	United States	2022	2	1	56,206	56,206	Allegiant Stadium, Las Vegas	
MLS All-Star	Association football	United States/Canada	2017	2 (Note: Since 2005, the game has featured an MLS all-star team against a visiting foreign club team.)	1	61,428	61,428	Soldier Field, Chicago	
Major League Baseball Japan All-Star Series	Baseball	Japan	2014	2	5	195,228	39,046	Osaka Dome, Osaka; Tokyo Dome, Tokyo; Sapporo Dome, Sapporo	
Senior Bowl	American football	United States	2014	2	1	37,914	37,914	Ladd–Peebles Stadium, Mobile	
MLB All-Star	Baseball	United States/Canada	2019	2	1	36,747	36,747	Progressive Field, Cleveland	
E. J. Whitten Legends Game	Australian rules football	Australia	2014	2	1	27,800	27,800	Docklands Stadium, Melbourne	
NHL All-Star	Ice hockey	United States/Canada	2018	4 (Note: Since the 2016 edition, the NHL All-Star Game has been organized as a four-team knockout tournament, with each team drawn exclusively from one of the league's four divisions.)	3 (Note: All games within the All-Star Game are played in an abbreviated format of a single 20-minute period, with each team having three skaters (instead of the regular five) and one goaltender on the ice at any given time (unless affected by penalties).)	19,092 (Note: Tickets for the All-Star Game are sold on a single-event basis. The 60 minutes of game time in the tournament is the same as a standard NHL game, and all three abbreviated games are held back-to-back as part of the same event.)	19,092	Amalie Arena, Tampa	
NBA All-Star	Basketball	United States/Canada	2018	2	1	17,801	17,801	Staples Center, Los Angeles	
All Stars Match	Rugby league	Australia	2024	2	1	15,579	15,579	North Queensland Stadium, Townsville	

== World and continental club competitions ==
This section lists the attendances at international competitions between sport clubs, ranked by average attendance. These are usually organised on a continental basis. The teams which compete in these tournaments also compete in the domestic competitions in their home countries.

Tournament	Sport	Region(s)	Year	Games	Total attendance	Average attendance	Source
UEFA Champions League	Association football	Europe	2025–26	189	8,377,696	44,326	
Recopa Sudamericana	Association football	South America	2023	2	80,222	40,111	
African Football League	Association football	Africa	2023	14	547,000	39,071	2023 African Football League
Under-20 Intercontinental Cup	Association football	Europe & South America	2023	1	37,386	37,386	
FIFA Club World Cup	Association football	Worldwide	2025	63	2,491,462	39,547	
UEFA Super Cup	Association football	Europe	2025	1	21,025	21,025	
UEFA Europa League	Association football	Europe	2025–26	189	4,954,145	26,212	
Copa Libertadores	Association football	South America	2022	88	2,315,584	26,313	
UEFA–CONMEBOL Club Challenge	Association football	Europe & South America	2023	1	19,407	19,407	
European Rugby Champions Cup	Rugby union	Europe	2023–24	63	1,160,390	18,419	2023–24 European Rugby Champions Cup
Leagues Cup	Association football	North America	2025	62	1,058,038	17,065	2025 Leagues Cup
Copa Sudamericana	Association football	South America	2022	71	1,100,154	15,495	
UEFA Conference League	Association football	Europe	2025–26	153	1,924,546	12,579	
Super Rugby	Rugby union	SANZAAR	2017	142	2,049,912	14,436	
AFC Champions League Elite	Association football	Asia & Australia	2019	126	1,796,810	14,260	
World Club Challenge	Rugby league	Worldwide	2023	1	13,873	13,873	
UEFA Women's Champions League	Women's association football	Europe	2025–26	75	554,535	7,394	
United Rugby Championship	Rugby union	Europe & Africa (Note: The five nations represented are Ireland, Italy, Scotland, South Africa and Wales.)	2022–23	151	1,633,458	10,818	
CAF Super Cup	Association football	Africa	2023	1	10,000	10,000	
CONCACAF Champions Cup	Association football	North America	2012–13	62	584,009	9,420	
EuroLeague	Basketball	Europe	2022–23	328	2,909,769	8,871	2022–23 EuroLeague
Caribbean Series	Baseball	Caribbean	2014	13	113,517	8,732	
Spengler Cup	Ice hockey	Worldwide	2023	11	68,937	6,267	
EPCR Challenge Cup	Rugby union	Europe	2022–23	51	314,320	6,163	2022–23 EPCR Challenge Cup
OFC Champions League	Association football	Oceania	2023	14	70,650	5,046	
EHF Champions League	Handball	Europe	2022–23	132	587,183	4,448	2022–23 EHF Champions League
European League of Football	American football	Europe	2023	99	428,631	4,330	2023 European League of Football
AFC Cup	Association football	Asia	2019	127	428,416	3,373	2019 AFC Cup
Champions Hockey League	Ice hockey	Europe	2022–23	125	355,153	2,841	
EuroCup Basketball	Basketball	Europe	2022–23	195	548,016	2,810	2022–23 EuroCup Basketball
Women's EHF Champions League	Handball	Europe	2022–23	131	352,257	2,689	2022–23 Women's EHF Champions League
CEV Champions League	Volleyball	Europe	2022–23	78	187,705	2,406	2022–23 CEV Champions League
FIVB Volleyball Women's Club World Championship	Volleyball	Worldwide	2023	10	23,641	2,364	2023 FIVB Volleyball Women's Club World Championship
CEV Women's Champions League	Volleyball	Europe	2022–23	79	166,085	2,102	2022–23 CEV Women's Champions League
OFC Women's Champions League	Association football	Oceania	2023	10	18,132	1,813	
EHF European League	Handball	Europe	2022–23	148	247,059	1,669	2022–23 EHF European League
FIBA Intercontinental Cup Final	Basketball	Worldwide	2023(S)	9	15,000	1,667	
EuroLeague Women	Basketball	Europe	2022–23	127	205,809	1,621	
Women's EHF European League	Handball	Europe	2022–23	60	85,355	1,423	2022–23 Women's EHF European League
Women's Asian Club Volleyball Championship	Volleyball	Asia & Oceania (Note: Teams from Oceania are eligible for participation, although none actually took part since 2002.)	2023	26	32,300	1,242	2023 Asian Women's Club Volleyball Championship
FIVB Volleyball Men's Club World Championship	Volleyball	Worldwide	2023	10	11,746	1,175	2023 FIVB Volleyball Men's Club World Championship
CEV Cup	Volleyball	Europe	2022–23	70	75,560	1,079	2022–23 CEV Cup
UEFA Youth League	Association football	Europe	2022–23	167	179,091	1,072	
FIBA Europe SuperCup Women	Basketball	Europe	2023	1	1,006	1,006	

== International tournaments ==
This section lists the attendances at international competitions between national teams and individuals, for its most recent event. These are usually organised on a continental basis. The teams and individuals which compete in these tournaments may also have competed in qualifying tournaments. The winners of continental championships usually play in a world cup or championship.

Tournament	Sport	Region	Frequency	Year	Games	Total attendance	Average attendance	Source
Finalissima	Association football	Europe & South America	Quadrennial	2022	1	87,112	87,112	
Women's Finalissima	Women's association football	Europe & South America	Quadrennial	2023	1	83,132	83,132	
Australian Open	Tennis	Worldwide	Annual	2025	15	1,076,308	71,754	
Six Nations Championship	Rugby union	Europe	Annual	2025	15	1,050,465	70,031	2025 Six Nations Championship
US Open	Tennis	Worldwide	Annual	2025	15	905,255	60,350	2025 US Open
FIFA World Cup	Association football	Worldwide	Quadrennial	2026	104	6,810,966	65,490	2026 FIFA World Cup
Rugby World Cup	Rugby union	Worldwide	Quadrennial	2023	48	2,437,208	50,775	2023 Rugby World Cup
The Rugby Championship	Rugby union	SANZAAR	Annual	2025	12	581,093	48,424	2025 Rugby Championship
UEFA European Championship	Association football	Europe	Quadrennial	2024	51	2,681,288	52,574	UEFA Euro 2024
Wimbledon	Tennis	Worldwide	Annual	2025	14	548,770	39,198	
Rugby World Cup Sevens	Rugby sevens	Worldwide	Quadrennial	2022	3 (Note: Number of days. A total of 84 games were played, but because rugby sevens games can be as short as 16 min, tickets were sold per day.)	105,000	35,000	
Copa América	Association football	South America (Note: Since the 1990s, teams from Asia and CONCACAF have been routinely invited. The 2024 edition had CONCACAF teams invited.)	Quadrennial	2024	32	1,571,878	49,121	2024 Copa América
CONCACAF Gold Cup	Association football	North America	Biennial	2025	31	779,014	25,129	2025 CONCACAF Gold Cup
FIFA Women's World Cup	Association football	Worldwide	Quadrennial	2023	64	1,978,274	30,911	2023 FIFA Women's World Cup
Cricket World Cup	Cricket	Worldwide	Quadrennial	2023	48	1,250,307	26,048	2023 Cricket World Cup
Rugby League Pacific Championship (men)	Rugby league	Oceania	Annual	2024	4	101,292	25,323	2024 Rugby League Pacific Championships
World Baseball Classic (Note: The World Baseball Classic and World Cup of Hockey are hosted in different regions of the world to boost attendance, as opposed to being hosted in one region like other international tournaments.)	Baseball	Worldwide	Quadrennial	2026	47	1,355,266	28,835	2026 World Baseball Classic
Asia Professional Baseball Championship	Baseball	Asia & Australia	Quadrennial	2023	8	162,811	20,351	2023 Asia Professional Baseball Championship
Women's Six Nations Championship	Women's rugby union	Europe	Annual	2026	15	279,760	18,651	2026 Women's Six Nations Championship
UEFA Women's Euro	Women's association football	Europe	Quadrennial	2025	31	657,291	21,203	UEFA Women's Euro 2025
AFF Championship	Association football	Asia	Biennial	2022	26	479,571	18,445	2022 AFF Championship
Africa Cup of Nations	Association football	Africa	Biennial	2025	52	1,340,022	25,770	2025 Africa Cup of Nations
FIFA Arab Cup	Association football	Worldwide	Quadrennial	2025	32	1,236,600	38,644	2025 FIFA Arab Cup
UEFA Nations League	Association football	Europe	Biennial	2024–25	188	4,384,892	23,324	2024–25 UEFA Nations League
World Rugby Pacific Nations	Rugby union	Oceania (Note: Teams from Asia, Europe and North America are routinely invited. The 2023 edition had an Asian team (Japan) invited.)	Annual	2023	6	103,409	17,235	2023 World Rugby Pacific Nations Cup
ICC Men's T20 World Cup	Cricket	Worldwide	Biennial	2022	45	751,597	16,702	2022 ICC Men's T20 World Cup
World Cup of Hockey	Ice hockey	Worldwide	Not Confirmed	2016	16	265,482	16,593	2016 World Cup of Hockey
Women's Rugby World Cup	Women's rugby union	Worldwide	Quadrennial	2025	32	441,356	13,792	2025 Women's Rugby World Cup
Men's Rugby League World Cup	Rugby league	Worldwide	Quadrennial	2022	31	423,689	13,667	2021 Rugby League World Cup
FIFA U-20 World Cup	Association football	Worldwide	Biennial	2025	52	585,069	11,251	2025 FIFA U-20 World Cup
AFC Asian Cup	Association football	Asia	Quadrennial	2023	51	1,507,790	29,565	2023 AFC Asian Cup
WBSC Premier 12	Baseball	Worldwide	Quadrennial	2019	32	357,525	11,173	2019 WBSC Premier12
UEFA European Under-21 Championship	Association football	Europe	Biennial	2025	31	250,492	8,080	2025 UEFA European Under-21 Championship
WAFF Championship	Association football	Asia	Biennial	2019	17	148,683	8,746	2019 WAFF Championship
EuroBasket	Basketball	Europe	Quadrennial	2022	76	651,000	8,566	EuroBasket 2022
Women's Rugby League World Cup	Rugby league	Worldwide	Quadrennial	2022	15	128,098	8,540	2021 Women's Rugby League World Cup
IFAF Junior World Championship	American football	Worldwide	Biennial	2018	9	76,115	8,457	2018 IFAF U-19 World Championship
FIFA U-17 World Cup	Association football	Worldwide	Annual	2025	104	100,073	962	2025 FIFA U-17 World Cup
CAFA Nations Cup	Association football	Asia	Biennial	2023	33	89,776	8,161	2023 CAFA Nations Cup
FIBA Basketball World Cup	Basketball	Worldwide	Quadrennial	2023	92	700,665	7,616	2023 FIBA Basketball World Cup
Ice Hockey World Championships	Ice hockey	Worldwide	Annual	2023	64	442,160	6,909	2023 IIHF World Championship
Copa América Femenina	Women's association football	South America	Biennial	2022	25	172,233	6,889	2022 Copa América Femenina
Constellation Cup	Netball	Oceania	Annual	2023	4	26,220	6,555	
AFC U-20 Asian Cup	Association football	Asia	Biennial	2023	31	203,176	6,554	2023 AFC U-20 Asian Cup
EAFF E-1 Football Championship	Association football	Asia	Biennial	2022	6	38,378	6,396	2022 EAFF E-1 Football Championship
SAFF Championship	Association football	Asia	Biennial	2023	15	93,993	6,266	2023 SAFF Championship
IIHF World Junior Championship	Ice hockey	Worldwide	Annual	2023–24	28	170,673	5,885	2024 World Junior Championships
CONCACAF W Championship	Women's association football	North America	Quadrennial	2022	16	94,028	5,877	2022 CONCACAF W Championship
FIFA U-17 Women's World Cup	Women's association football	Worldwide	Annual	2025	52	72,762	1,399	2025 FIFA U-17 Women's World Cup
IHF World Men's Handball Championship	Handball	Worldwide	Biennial	2023	112	618,112	5,519	2023 World Championship
FIFA U-20 Women's World Cup	Women's association football	Worldwide	Biennial	2024	52	375,841	7,228	2024 FIFA U-20 Women's World Cup
Asian Baseball Championship	Baseball	Asia	Biennial	2023	22	113,810	5,173	
UEFA Futsal Championship	Futsal	Europe	Quadrennial	2018	20	101,934	5,097	UEFA Futsal Euro 2018
Davis Cup Finals	Tennis	Worldwide	Annual	2023	31	155,992	5,032	
AFC U-23 Asian Cup	Association football	Asia	Biennial	2022	32	154,134	4,817	2022 AFC U-23 Asian Cup
European Men's Handball Championship	Handball	Europe	Biennial	2022	65	312,892	4,814	2022 European Championship
FIBA Women's Basketball World Cup	Basketball	Worldwide	Quadrennial	2022	38	145,519	3,829	2022 FIBA Women's Basketball World Cup
FIVB Volleyball Men's World Championship	Volleyball	Worldwide	Quadrennial	2022	52	194,612	3,743	2022 FIVB Volleyball Men's World Championship
FIVB Volleyball Women's World Cup	Volleyball	Worldwide	Quadrennial	2019	66	219,802	3,330	2019 FIVB Volleyball Women's World Cup
FIVB Volleyball Women's Nations League	Volleyball	Worldwide	Annual	2023	104	344,618	3,314	2023 FIVB Volleyball Women's Nations League
SAFF U-20 Women's Championship	Women's association football	Asia	Biennial	2023	7	22,748	3,250	2023 SAFF U-20 Women's Championship
Men's World Floorball Championship	Floorball	Worldwide	Biennial	2022	48	155,485	3,239	2022 Men's World Floorball Championships
Rugby Africa Gold Cup	Rugby union	Africa	Annual	2018	15	48,100	3,206	2018 Rugby Africa season
World Men's Curling Championship	Curling	Worldwide	Annual	2023	24 (Note: Number of draws. Up to 4 games are played simultaneously as a part of the same draw.)	75,960	3,165	
IHF World Women's Handball Championship	Handball	Worldwide	Biennial	2023	112	344,399	3,075	2023 World Championship
FIVB Volleyball Men's Nations League	Volleyball	Worldwide	Annual	2023	104	318,294	3,061	2023 FIVB Volleyball Men's Nations League
ICC Women's T20 World Cup	Cricket	Worldwide	Biennial	2023	23	70,000	3,043	
Rugby Europe International Championships	Rugby union	Europe	Annual	2023	20	60,619	3,031	2023 Rugby Europe Championship
SEA Women's V.League	Volleyball	Asia	Annual	2023	12	24,700	2,892	2023 SEA Women's V.League
OFC Men's Nations Cup	Association football	Oceania	Quadrennial	2024	13	41,400	3,185	2024 OFC Men's Nations Cup
FIFA Futsal World Cup	Futsal	Worldwide	Quadrennial	2024	52	152,823	2,939	2024 FIFA Futsal World Cup
European Women's Handball Championship	Handball	Europe	Biennial	2022	47	125,545	2,671	2022 European Championship
SAFF U-19 Championship	Association football	Asia	Biennial	2023	9	23,233	2,581	2023 SAFF U-19 Championship
Women's European Volleyball Championship	Volleyball	Europe	Biennial	2023	76	193,864	2,551	2023 Women's European Volleyball Championship
SAFF Women's Championship	Women's association football	Asia	Biennial	2022	12	30,048	2,504	2022 SAFF Women's Championship
Men's European Volleyball Championship	Volleyball	Europe	Biennial	2023	76	184,799	2,432	2023 Men's European Volleyball Championship
FIVB Volleyball Women's World Championship	Volleyball	Worldwide	Quadrennial	2022	100	231,515	2,315	2022 FIVB Volleyball Women's World Championship
FIVB Volleyball Men's World Cup	Volleyball	Worldwide	Quadrennial	2019	66	152,460	2,310	2019 FIVB Volleyball Men's World Cup
Men's Asian Volleyball Championship	Volleyball	Asia & Oceania	Biennial	2023	41	92,120	2,247	2023 Asian Men's Volleyball Championship
AFF U-16 Youth Championship	Association football	Asia	Biennial	2022	22	45,206	2,055	2022 AFF U-16 Youth Championship
Netball World Cup	Netball	Worldwide	Quadrennial	2023	60	120,000	2,000	
IIHF Women's World Championship	Women's ice hockey	Worldwide	Annual	2023	31	59,372	1,915	2023 Women's World Championship
AFC Women's Asian Cup	Women's association football	Asia	Quadrennial	2026	27	358,414	13,275	2026 AFC Women's Asian Cup
SAFF U-16 Championship	Association football	Asia	Biennial	2023	9	16,475	1,831	2023 SAFF U-16 Championship
IIHF World U18 Championships	Ice hockey	Worldwide	Annual	2023	30	47,087	1,570	2023 IIHF World U18 Championships
U-18 Asian Baseball Championship	Baseball	Asia	Biennial	2018	16	23,804	1,488	
Rugby League European Championship	Rugby league	Europe	Biennial	2018	6	8,866	1,478	2018 Rugby League European Championship
Men's U22 European Volleyball Championship	Volleyball	Europe	Biennial	2022	16	23,310	1,457	2022 Men's U22 European Volleyball Championship
AfroBasket	Basketball	Africa	Quadrennial	2021	35	48,478	1,393	
UEFA European Under-19 Championship	Association football	Europe	Annual	2026	16	21,856	1,366	2026 UEFA European Under-19 Championship
Women's Asian Volleyball Cup	Volleyball	Asia & Oceania	Biennial	2022	28	37,700	1,346	2022 Asian Women's Volleyball Cup
Asia Rugby Championship	Rugby union	Asia	Annual	2023	3	4,000	1,333	2023 Asia Rugby Championship
CAFA U-20 Championship	Association football	Asia	Biennial	2023	10	13,309	1,331	2023 CAFA U-20 Championship
Men's European Volleyball League	Volleyball	Europe	Annual	2023	58	76,401	1,317	2023 Men's European Volleyball League
FIBA Asia Cup	Basketball	Asia & Oceania	Quadrennial	2022	36	47,173	1,310	2022 FIBA Asia Cup
CAFA U-16 Boys Championship	Association football	Asia	Biennial	2022	10	13,047	1,305	2022 CAFA U-16 Championship
Rugby Europe Women's Championship	Women's rugby union	Europe	Annual	2023	3	3,900	1,300	2023 Rugby Europe Women's Championship
Wheelchair Rugby League World Cup	Wheelchair rugby league	Worldwide	Quadrennial	2022	15	19,450	1,297	2021 Wheelchair Rugby League World Cup
UEFA Women's Futsal Championship	Futsal	Europe	Quadrennial	2023	4	5,054	1,264	UEFA Women's Futsal Euro 2023
ICF Canoe Polo World Championships	Canoe polo	Worldwide	Biennial	2022	24 (Note: Number of (day, pitch) pairs. A total of 281 games were played, but because canoe polo games can be as short as 23 min, tickets were sold per day.)	30,000	1,250	
Billie Jean King Cup Finals	Tennis	Worldwide	Annual	2023	15	17,656	1,177	
Girls' Asian U16 Volleyball Championship	Volleyball	Asia & Oceania	Biennial	2023	29	34,010	1,173	2023 Asian Girls' U16 Volleyball Championship
SEA Men's V.League	Volleyball	Asia	Annual	2023	12	14,000	1,167	2023 SEA Men's V.League
South and Central American Women's Handball Championship	Handball	South & Central America	Biennial	2022	10	11,450	1,145	2022 South and Central American Championship
Euro Floorball Tour Men	Floorball	Europe	Annual	2023	6	6,740	1,123	
IHF Men's Junior World Championship	Handball	Worldwide	Biennial	2023	116	130,000	1,121	
Men's Pan-American Volleyball Cup	Volleyball	Americas	Annual	2023	23	25,425	1,105	2023 Men's Pan-American Volleyball Cup
FIFA Beach Soccer World Cup	Beach soccer	Worldwide	Biennial	2019	32	34,997	1,094	2019 FIFA Beach Soccer World Cup
U-12 Baseball World Cup	Baseball	Worldwide	Biennial	2023	50	53,190	1,064	
Women's NORCECA Volleyball Championship	Volleyball	North America	Biennial	2023	17	17,789	1,046	2023 Women's NORCECA Volleyball Championship
UEFA Women's Under-19 Championship	Women's association football	Europe	Annual	2023	15	15,149	1,010	2023 UEFA Women's Under-19 Championship

== World and continental championship final events ==
These are restricted to final matches of world and continental club events.

Tournament	Sport	Continent/Countries	Crowd	Year	Venue	City	Source
UEFA Champions League final	Association football	Europe	61,035	2026	Puskás Aréna	Budapest, Hungary	
Copa Libertadores final	Association football	South America	70,048	2025	Estadio Monumental	Lima, Peru	
UEFA Europa League final	Association football	Europe	37,324	2026	Beşiktaş Stadium	Istanbul, Turkey	
United Rugby Championship final	Rugby union	Europe & Africa	56,344	2023	Cape Town Stadium	Cape Town, South Africa	
FIFA Club World Cup final	Association football	Worldwide	81,118	2025	MetLife Stadium	East Rutherford, United States	
European Rugby Champions Cup final	Rugby union	Europe	51,711	2023	Aviva Stadium	Dublin, Ireland	
Caribbean Series final	Baseball	Caribbean	34,821	2023	Monumental Stadium of Caracas Simón Bolívar	Caracas, Venezuela	
UEFA Women's Champions League final	Women's association football	Europe	24,258	2026	Ullevaal Stadion	Oslo, Norway	
EPCR Challenge Cup final	Rugby union	Europe	31,514	2023	Aviva Stadium	Dublin, Ireland	
European League of Football final	American football	Europe	31,500	2023	Schauinsland-Reisen-Arena	Duisburg, Germany	
Leagues Cup final	Association football	North America	69,314	2025	Lumen Field	Seattle, United States	
AFC Cup final	Association football	Asia	27,722	2022	Bukit Jalil National Stadium	Kuala Lumpur, Malaysia	
Super Rugby final	Rugby union	Oceania	25,000	2023	Waikato Stadium	Hamilton, New Zealand	
Women's EHF Champions League final	Handball	Europe	19,750	2023	MVM Dome	Budapest, Hungary	
CAF Women's Champions League final	Women's association football	Africa	20,000	2023	Amadou Gon Coulibaly Stadium	Korhogo, Ivory Coast	
EHF Champions League final	Handball	Europe	19,750	2023	Lanxess Arena	Cologne, Germany	
Copa Sudamericana final	Association football	South America	44,164	2025	Estadio Defensores del Chaco	Asunción, Paraguay	
UEFA Conference League final	Association football	Europe	39,176	2026	Red Bull Arena	Leipzig, Germany	
Basketball Champions League Final	Basketball	Europe	11,800	2023	Palacio de Deportes José María Martín Carpena	Málaga, Spain	
EuroLeague final	Basketball	Europe	11,066	2023	Žalgirio Arena	Kaunas, Lithuania	
CEV Women's Champions League final	Volleyball	Europe	10,447	2023	Pala Alpitour	Turin, Italy	
CEV Champions League final	Volleyball	Europe	10,447	2023	Pala Alpitour	Turin, Italy	
EuroCup Basketball final	Basketball	Europe	9,869	2023	Gran Canaria Arena	Las Palmas, Spain	
UEFA Youth League final	Association football	Europe	5,405	2026	Stade de la Tuilière	Lausanne, Switzerland	
Super Rugby Americas final	Rugby union	Americas	9,000	2023	Estadio Charrúa	Montevideo, Uruguay	
FIBA Intercontinental Cup final	Basketball	Worldwide	8,000	2023	Singapore Indoor Stadium	Singapore	
Basketball Africa League final	Basketball	Africa	7,532	2023	BK Arena	Kigali, Rwanda	
Spengler Cup final	Ice hockey	Worldwide	6,267	2023	Eisstadion Davos	Davos, Switzerland	
Champions Hockey League final	Ice hockey	Europe	6,150	2023	Coop Norrbotten Arena	Luleå, Sweden	
OFC Champions League final	Association football	Oceania	5,420	2023	VFF Freshwater Stadium	Port Vila, Vanuatu	
UEFA Futsal Champions League final	Futsal	Europe	5,280	2023	Palma Arena	Palma de Mallorca, Spain	
EHF European League final	Handball	Europe	4,300	2023	Campushalle	Flensburg, Germany	
UEFA Regions' Cup final	Association football	Europe	4,085	2023	Campo Municipal de A Lomba	Vilagarcía de Arousa, Spain	
Copa Libertadores Femenina final	Women's association football	South America	3,580	2023	Estadio Pascual Guerrero	Cali, Colombia	
Women's Asian Club Volleyball Championship final	Volleyball	Asia & Oceania	3,000	2023	Vĩnh Phúc Gymnasium	Vĩnh Yên, Vietnam	
LEN Champions League final	Water polo	Europe	3,000	2023	SRC 11. April	Belgrade, Serbia	
FIVB Volleyball Women's Club World Championship final	Volleyball	Worldwide	2,967	2023	Yellow Dragon Sports Center	Hangzhou, China	
EuroLeague Women final	Basketball	Europe	2,500	2023	Královka Arena	Prague, Czech Republic	
FIVB Volleyball Men's Club World Championship final	Volleyball	Worldwide	1,848	2023	Koramangala Indoor Stadium	Bangalore, India	
IHF Men's Super Globe final	Handball	Worldwide	1,800	2023	Ministry of Sports Hall	Dammam, Saudi Arabia	
Euroleague Basketball Next Generation Tournament final	Basketball	Europe	1,755	2023	Kaunas Sports Hall	Kaunas, Lithuania	
Rugby Europe Super Cup final	Rugby union	Europe	1,500	2023	Avchala Stadium	Tbilisi, Georgia	
Women's EHF European League final	Handball	Europe	1,500	2023	Raiffeisen Sportpark	Graz, Austria	
LEN Women's Champions League final	Water polo	Europe	1,350	2023	Piscina Can Llong	Sabadell, Spain	
AFC Futsal Club Championship final	Futsal	Asia	1,200	2019	Bangkok Arena	Bangkok, Thailand	
South and Central American Women's Club Handball Championship final	Handball	South & Central America	1,200	2023	Ginásio Poliesportivo Henrique Villaboim	São Paulo, Brazil	
Bandy World Cup final	Bandy	Worldwide	1,025	2019	Göransson Arena	Sandviken, Sweden	
Floorball Champions Cup men's final	Floorball	Europe	1,012	2023	Ideapark Bläk Boks	Lempäälä, Finland	
Women's EHF Beach Handball Champions Cup final	Beach handball	Europe	1,000	2023	Beach Court 1	Porto Santo, Portugal	
Futsal Women's European Champions final	Futsal	Europe	1,000	2023	Pabellón Municipal de Vista Alegre	Burela, Spain	

== World and continental competition final (two decider matches) ==
These are restricted to final matches of world and continental club events, played in a two-legged tie format. The two matches may be held in one or two different venues.

Competition	Sport	Continent	Year	Venue	City	Match Crowd	Total Crowd	Source
CAF Confederation Cup	Association football	Africa	2023	Benjamin Mkapa Stadium	Dar es Salaam, Tanzania	60,000	124,000	
CAF Confederation Cup	Association football	Africa	2023	Stade du 5 Juillet	Algiers, Algeria	64,000	124,000	
AFC Champions League	Association football	Asia & Australia	2023	King Saud University Stadium	Riyadh, Saudi Arabia	50,881	104,455	
AFC Champions League	Association football	Asia & Australia	2023	Saitama Stadium 2002	Saitama, Japan	53,574	104,455	
CAF Champions League	Association football	Africa	2023	Cairo International Stadium	Cairo, Egypt	50,000	95,000	
CAF Champions League	Association football	Africa	2023	Stade Mohammed V	Casablanca, Morocco	45,000	95,000	
African Football League	Association football	Africa	2023	Stade Mohammed V	Casablanca, Morocco	45,000	95,000	
African Football League	Association football	Africa	2023	Loftus Versfeld Stadium	Pretoria, South Africa	50,000	95,000	
CONCACAF Champions League	Association football	North America	2023	Estadio León	León, Mexico	20,517	42,930	
CONCACAF Champions League	Association football	North America	2023	BMO Stadium	Los Angeles, United States	22,413	42,930	
CEV Challenge Cup	Volleyball	Europe	2023	Shlomo Group Arena	Tel Aviv, Israel	3,000	16,000	
CEV Challenge Cup	Volleyball	Europe	2023	Peace and Friendship Stadium	Piraeus, Greece	13,000	16,000	
FIBA Europe Cup	Basketball	Europe	2023	Hala Mistrzów	Włocławek, Poland	3,963	8,852	
FIBA Europe Cup	Basketball	Europe	2023	La Meilleraie	Cholet, France	4,889	8,852	
EHF European Cup Women	Handball	Europe	2023	Pabellón Municipal de A Sangriña	A Guarda, Spain	776	6,976	
EHF European Cup Women	Handball	Europe	2023	Antalya Sports Hall	Antalya, Turkey	6,200	6,976	
EuroCup Women	Basketball	Europe	2023	Astroballe	Villeurbanne, France	4,425	6,525	
EuroCup Women	Basketball	Europe	2023	Sinan Erdem Dome	Istanbul, Turkey	2,100	6,525	
CEV Women's Challenge Cup	Volleyball	Europe	2023	PalaRuffini	Turin, Italy	3,971	5,771	
CEV Women's Challenge Cup	Volleyball	Europe	2023	Constantin Jude Sports Hall	Timișoara, Romania	1,800	5,771	
CEV Cup	Volleyball	Europe	2023	PalaPanini	Modena, Italy	3,100	5,600	
CEV Cup	Volleyball	Europe	2023	Tomabelhal	Roeselare, Belgium	2,500	5,600	
EHF European Cup	Handball	Europe	2023	SC Slana Bara	Novi Sad, Serbia	2,000	5,500	
EHF European Cup	Handball	Europe	2023	DNB Arena	Stavanger, Norway	3,500	5,500	
Women's CEV Cup	Volleyball	Europe	2023	Sala Sporturilor	Târgu Mureș, Romania	2,000	5,250	
Women's CEV Cup	Volleyball	Europe	2023	Palazzo Wanny	Florence, Italy	3,250	5,250	
LEN Euro Cup	Water polo	Europe	2023	Piscina Carlo Zanelli	Savona, Italy	1,500	3,500	
LEN Euro Cup	Water polo	Europe	2023	Komjádi Béla Sportuszoda	Budapest, Hungary	2,000	3,500	

== See also ==
- List of attendance figures at domestic professional sports leagues
- List of professional sports leagues by revenue
- Lists of stadiums
