= 2026 Men's U22 European Volleyball Championship =

Tournament details
- Host country: Portugal
- Dates: 29 June – 4 July 2026
- Teams: 8
- Venue: 1 (in 1 host city)

Final positions
- Champions: Czech Republic (1st title)
- Runners-up: Poland
- Third place: Israel
- Fourth place: France

Tournament awards
- MVP: (Czech Republic) Vaclav Seidl

The 2026 Men's U22 European Volleyball Championship, also referred to as EuroVolleyU22M 2026, will be the 3rd edition of the biannual continental tournament for men's under-22 national volleyball teams, organised by Europe's governing volleyball body, CEV. The tournament will be held between from 29 June to 4 July 2026. It will be organised in Portugal, marking the first time the country will host this championship.

8 teams will participate for the third time as well. Qualification took place in July 2025 to decide the final 7 spots. The hosts Portugal qualified automatically. Israel and Ukraine will make their debut.

France are the defending champions, having beaten Italy, 3–2, in the final in Apeldoorn.

== Host selection ==
On 28 February 2025, Portugal was given the hosting rights, with Albufeira as the host city. This will be Portugal's first time hosting the competition.

=== Quotes ===
"The award of the European Under-22 Men's Championship is yet another demonstration of the trust placed in the federation by the entity that governs volleyball at European level. We believe that holding the European Championship final in Albufeira, the European City of Sport in 2026, will be a fair return for all the support that Albufeira City Council has given us, contributing decisively to further accelerating the growth of sport in the Algarve region, due to the visibility and prestige that it brings to national sport and to our country."

— Vicente Araújo, president of the Portuguese Volleyball Federation.

== Group stage ==
=== Pool I ===
Pos	Team	Pld	W	L	Pts	SW	SL	SR	SPW	SPL	SPR	Qualification
1	Israel	3	2	1	6	6	3	2.000	194	197	0.985	Semifinals
2	Poland	3	2	1	6	8	5	1.600	276	252	1.095	Semifinals
3	Ukraine	3	2	1	5	6	6	1.000	261	255	1.024	
4	Portugal	3	0	3	1	3	9	0.333	251	278	0.903	

Source: CEV.eu

Date	Time		Score		Set 1	Set 2	Set 3	Set 4	Set 5	Total	Report
29 June	15:00	Israel	3–0	Ukraine	25–19	25–22	25–20			75–61	Report
29 June	18:00	Portugal	2–3	Poland	23–25	25–21	25–18	22–25	12–15	107–104	Report
30 June	12:00	Ukraine	3–2	Poland	15–25	25–20	21–25	25–14	15–13	101–97	Report
30 June	18:00	Israel	3–0	Portugal	25–22	25–18	25–21			75–61	Report
1 July	12:00	Poland	3–0	Israel	25–15	25–14	25–15			75–44	Report
1 July	18:00	Ukraine	3–1	Portugal	25–12	25–22	24–26	25–23		99–83	Report

=== Pool II ===
Pos	Team	Pld	W	L	Pts	SW	SL	SR	SPW	SPL	SPR	Qualification
1	France	3	3	0	7	9	5	1.800	307	284	1.081	Semifinals
2	Czech Republic	3	2	1	7	8	5	1.600	293	275	1.065	Semifinals
3	Italy	2	1	1	3	4	3	1.333	158	163	0.969	
4	Bulgaria	3	0	3	0	2	9	0.222	234	272	0.860	

Source: CEV.eu

Date	Time		Score		Set 1	Set 2	Set 3	Set 4	Set 5	Total	Report
29 June	12:00	Bulgaria	0–3	Italy	26–28	22–25	20–25			68–78	Report
29 June	20:30	France	3–2	Czech Republic	16–25	25–22	22–25	25–17	15–9	103–98	Report
30 June	15:00	Italy	1–3	Czech Republic	18–25	21–25	25–20	16–25		80–95	Report
30 June	20:30	Bulgaria	1–3	France	25–19	16–25	15–25	18–25		74–94	Report
1 July	15:00	Czech Republic	3–1	Bulgaria	29–27	21–25	25–19	25–21		100–92	Report
1 July	20:30	Italy	2–3	France	31–33	25–19	20–25	25–18	11–15	112–110	Report

== Final round ==
Semifinals
3 July
Israel	2
Czech Republic	3
3 July
France	0
Poland	3

Final
4 July
Czech Republic	3
Poland	1
3rd place match
4 July
Israel	3
France	0

=== Semifinals ===
Date	Time		Score		Set 1	Set 2	Set 3	Set 4	Set 5	Total	Report
3 Jul	16:00	Israel	2–3	Czech Republic	25–21	42–40	20–25	23–25	9–15	119–126	Report
3 Jul	19:00	France	0–3	Poland	23–25	17–25	18–25			58–75	Report

=== 3rd place match ===
Date	Time		Score		Set 1	Set 2	Set 3	Set 4	Set 5	Total	Report
4 Jul	16:00	Israel	3–0	France	25–21	25–23	25–18			75–62	Report

=== Final ===
Date	Time		Score		Set 1	Set 2	Set 3	Set 4	Set 5	Total	Report
4 Jul	19:00	Czech Republic	3–1	Poland	25–27	27–25	25–20	25–13		102–85	Report

== Dream Team ==
- MVP
  (Czech Republic) Vaclav Seidl
- Best setter
  (Poland) Błażej Bień
- Best outside spikers
  (Israel) Shay Liberman
  (Czech Republic) Matěj Pastrňák
- Best middle blockers
  (Czech Republic) Antonín Klimeš
  (Czech Republic) Štěpán Svoboda
- Best Opposite
  (Poland) Wojciech Gajek
- Best libero
  (Portugal) João Salgueiro

== Final standing ==
Rank	Team
1st place, gold medalist(s)	Czech Republic
2nd place, silver medalist(s)	Poland
3rd place, bronze medalist(s)	Israel
4	France
5	Ukraine
6	Italy
7	Portugal
8	Bulgaria

== See also ==
- 2026 Women's U22 European Volleyball Championship
