= Hungary men's national under-21 volleyball team =

Youth volleyball team representing Hungary

Hungary U21
- Association: Hungarian Volleyball Federation
- Confederation: CEV

Uniforms
Home	Away	Third

FIVB U21 World Championship
- Appearances: No Appearances

Europe U21 / U20 Championship
- Appearances: Data uncompleted
- Hungarian Volleyball Federation

The Hungary men's national under-21 volleyball team represents Hungary in international men's volleyball competitions and friendly matches under the age 21 and it is ruled by the Hungarian Volleyball Federation body that is an affiliate of the Federation of International Volleyball FIVB and also part of the European Volleyball Confederation CEV.

== Results ==
=== FIVB U21 World Championship ===
Champions Runners up Third place Fourth place

FIVB U21 World Championship
Year	Round	Position	Pld	W	L	SW	SL	Squad
(Brazil) 1977	Didn't qualify							
(United States) 1981	Didn't qualify							
(Italy) 1985	Didn't qualify							
(Bahrain) 1987	Didn't qualify							
(Greece) 1989	Didn't qualify							
(Egypt) 1991	Didn't qualify							
(Argentina) 1993	Didn't qualify							
(Malaysia) 1995	Didn't qualify							
(Bahrain) 1997	Didn't qualify							
(Thailand) 1999	Didn't qualify							
(Poland) 2001	Didn't qualify							
(Iran) 2003	Didn't qualify							
(India) 2005	Didn't qualify							
(Morocco) 2007	Didn't qualify							
(India) 2009	Didn't qualify							
(Brazil) 2011	Didn't qualify							
(Turkey) 2013	Didn't qualify							
(Mexico) 2015	Didn't qualify							
(Czech Republic) 2017	Didn't qualify							
(Bahrain) 2019	Didn't qualify							
(Italy) (Bulgaria) 2021	Didn't qualify							
(Bahrain) 2023	Didn't qualify							
(China) 2025	Didn't qualify							
Total	0 Titles	0/23						

== Team ==
=== Current squad ===
The following players are the Hungarian players that have competed in the 2018 Men's U20 Volleyball European Championship

#	name	position	height	weight	birthday	spike	block
1	iván bence	opposite	197	82	2001	321	310
2	flachner kornél	middle-blocker	195	89	2001	312	303
4	farkas róbert zsolt	libero	182	71	1999	309	285
5	szabó bence	setter	185	74	2000	318	307
6	szabó barna frigyes	opposite	202	96	2000	324	318
7	szabó márton	middle-blocker	185	85	1999	335	320
9	csizmadia tamás	setter	183	77	2000	311	290
10	hartyányi gergo	libero	168	60	1999	250	230
11	fülöp péter	outside-spiker	73	230	1999	308	0
12	horváth kristóf	outside-spiker	198	86	1999	340	325
15	flachner dániel	middle-blocker	199	98	1999	322	307
16	móró ákos	outside-spiker	187	77	1999	314	300
17	kiss máté	outside-spiker	190	67	2000	330	315
19	iván gergo	setter	185	70	2002	308	300
20	matyiák árpád	opposite	192	80	2001	332	312
21	laczi dominik	outside-spiker	188	71	2001	306	297
22	péter márton	opposite	186	76	1999	250	240
22	tomanóczy bálint	middle-blocker	203	91	2001	325	305
