= Volleyball Federation of Kosovo =

Governing body of volleyball in Kosovo

- Sport: Volleyball
- Jurisdiction: Kosovo
- Affiliation: FIVB
- Regional affiliation: CEV
- Headquarters: Pristina

Official website
- www.fvk-ks.org
- (Kosovo)

Volleyball Federation of Kosovo (Albanian: Federata e Volejebollit e Kosovës, Serbian: Oдбojкашки савез Косова / Odbojkaški savez Kosova) is the governing body of volleyball in Kosovo).

== History ==
Volleyball another sport that is played by hand, first appeared in Kosovo in 1936 in the high schools of cities like: Priština, Peć, Prizren etc. The first championship was held in Pristina on October 24 to 26 1948, six teams participated as: Proleter, Budućnost, Trepča, Borac, Metohija, Bratstvo. During 1966–1967, four teams from AP Kosovo took part in the second division of the league of Yugoslavia. In 1990 KV Priština-Elektroekonomija took part in qualification to enter the first division of Yugoslavia but did not succeed. First League of Women was organized in 1975. Univerzitet from Priština was the first team of women who took part in the second division league of Yugoslavia. Now volleyball federation of Kosovo organizes competitions in the category of women and men. Major league called Superleague of Kosovo then come cup of Kosovo, the first league and junior's league. Also part of the Volleyball Federation of Kosovo are competitions : Cup of Kosovo and beach volley. Teams participating in Super league of Kosovo are: Theranda, KV Drenica, KV R&Rukolli, KV Besa, KV Luboteni, KV Ferizaji. The current champion is KV Luboteni.

== See also ==
- Olympic Committee of Kosovo
