= San Marino Stadium =

Football stadium in Serravalle, San Marino

Coordinates: 43°58′17″N 12°28′37″E

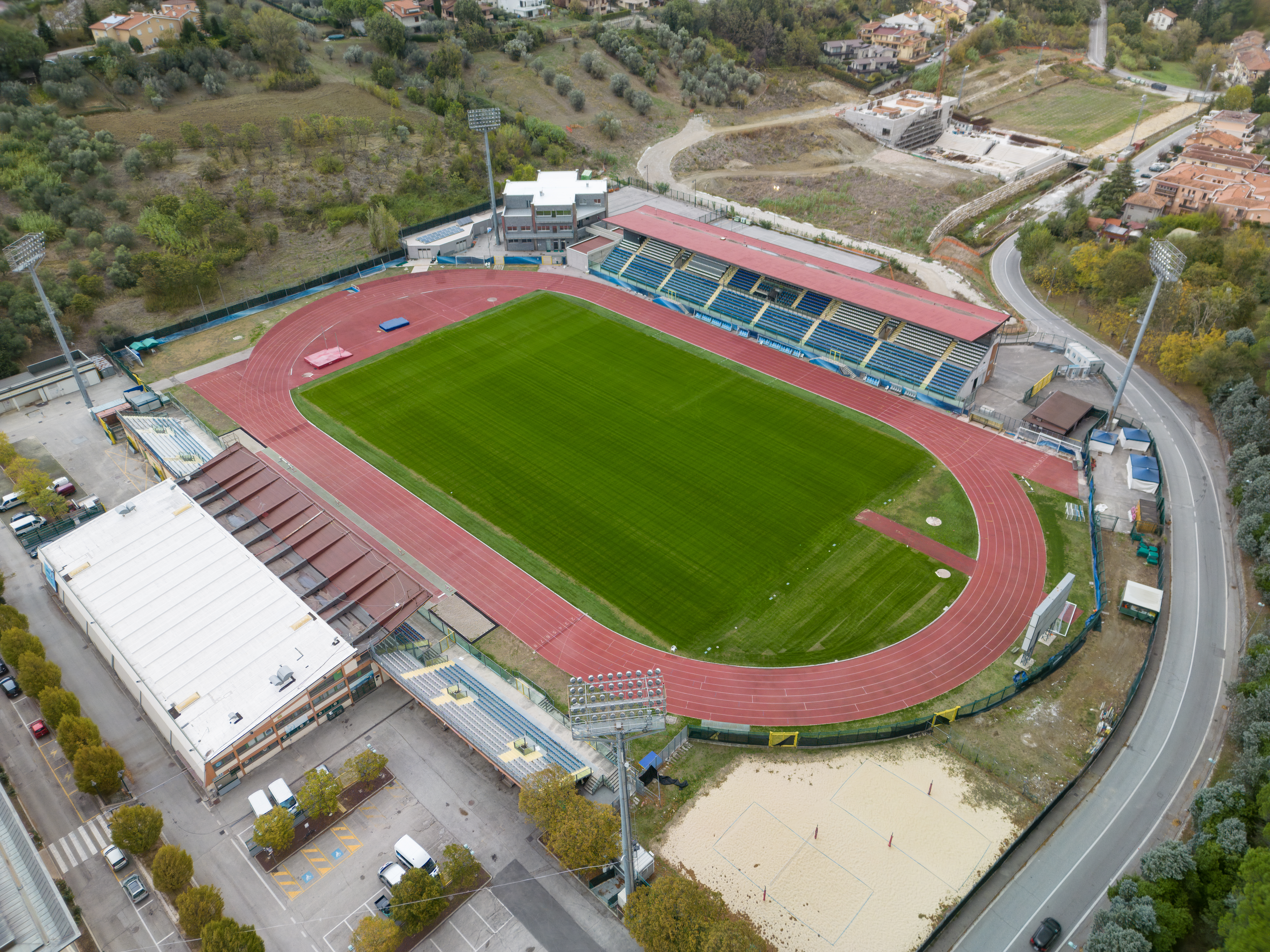
- Interactive map of San Marino Stadium
- Full name: San Marino Stadium
- Address: 47899, Via Roncaglia; Serravalle, San Marino
- Operator: Federazione Sammarinese Giuoco Calcio
- Capacity: 4,798
- Surface: Grass
- Field size: 103 × 67 metres

Construction
- Opened: 1969

Tenants
- San Marino national football team Campionato Sammarinese teams (select matches)

The San Marino Stadium (formerly Stadio Olimpico di Serravalle) is a multi-purpose stadium in Serravalle, San Marino. First opened in 1969, it is used mostly for football matches. It is the national stadium of San Marino.

== Overview ==
The stadium was named "olympic" in 1985, on the occasion of the first Games of the Small States of Europe sponsored by the International Olympic Committee.

From 1969 till 2019, the stadium was used by ASD Victor San Marino for its home games. It was also used by Serravalle-based football club A.C. Juvenes/Dogana for its home games in the Italian league until the side withdrew in 2007 to concentrate only on the Sammarinese Championship. It is an all-seater stadium with a maximum capacity of 4,798. It has hosted teams such as England, Spain, Germany, the Netherlands and Scotland.

The San Marino national team's three biggest defeats at the stadium are 13–0 to Germany in September 2006, 10–0 to England in 2021, and joint third are two 8–0 defeats in 2013 to both England and Ukraine. Two out of the national team's total three wins were also in this stadium — a friendly 1–0 beating of Liechtenstein in April 2004, and a win over the same opponents by the same scoreline in the UEFA Nations League in September 2024. San Marino's first official international match, which was a 4–0 defeat to Switzerland, was also played here. In 2014, at the stadium, the San Marino national team earned its first ever point in European Championship qualifying, in a 0–0 draw with Estonia.

It is home to the youth teams of San Marino, some of which have worse records on the international stage than the senior team; though their Under-21 side did record a shock 1–0 win over their Welsh counterparts in 2013.

On 2 September 2014, the stadium was renamed San Marino Stadium in the presence of San Marino football officials, who presented improvements and additions to the facility, including new changing rooms, a gym, and a TV studio.

The stadium hosted matches at the 2019 UEFA European Under-21 Championship.

The final of the San Marino domestic cup, the Coppa Titano, is also played here each year.

The stadium typically hosts home matches for San Marino teams in UEFA competitions.

== See also ==
- Sport in San Marino
- Football in San Marino
- Athletics at the 1985 Games of the Small States of Europe
