= Sport in San Marino =

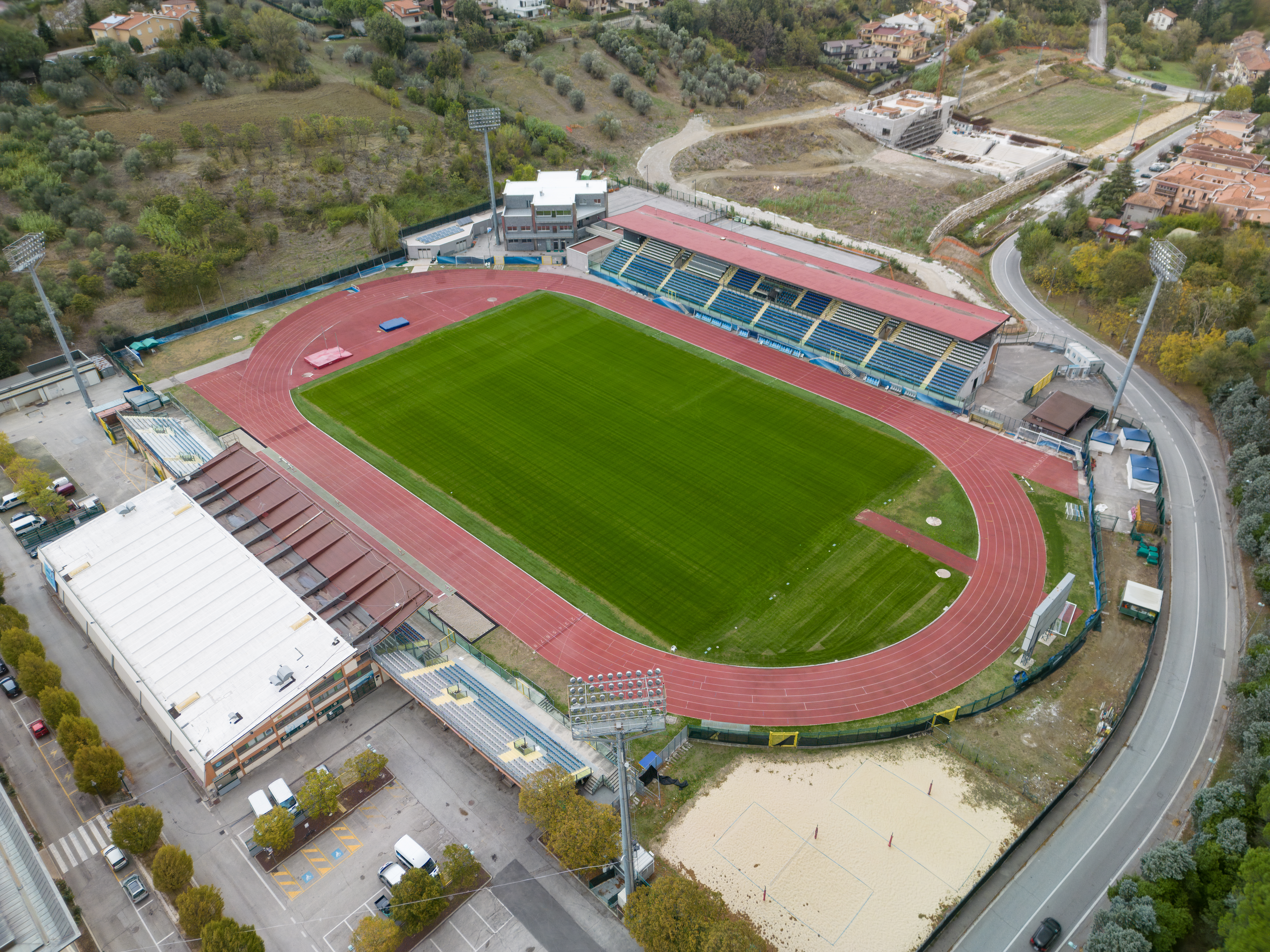
Stadio Olimpico

Several sports are played at a professional level in San Marino, a country in Europe enclaved by Italy.

== Football ==
San Marino, along with Italy, enjoys football (soccer) as its most popular sport.

=== Domestic football ===
The San Marino Championship, founded under the auspices of the FSGC (San Marino Football Federation), is the premier footballing competition in San Marino. The fifteen teams that take part in the competition are split into two groups of eight and seven teams. The top three from each section at the end of the regular season progress into a semi-knockout style Championship Playoff. Prior to 2007, the playoff champion earned a spot in the preliminary rounds of the UEFA Cup. In 2007, UEFA granted San Marino a spot in the 1st Qualifying Round of the Champions League. 2007 league champions S.S. Murata was the first team to represent San Marino in the Champions League when they participated in the 2007-08 competition, losing to Finland's Tampere team. San Marino also has a representative in the Italian system, with San Marino Calcio playing in the fourth tier of Italian football, Serie D. San Marino play their home matches in the Sanmarinese at the Stadio Olimpico of Serravalle.

=== International football ===
The San Marino national team played its first unofficial international match in 1986, in which it suffered a 0–1 defeat to the Canadian Olympic team. Its first competitive outing was on 14 November 1990, a 0–4 loss against Switzerland in the European Championship qualifier. These defeats set the tone for most of the following outings of the team, who are regarded as whipping boys in the qualifying sections of the European Championship and the World Cup, calling into question the merits of San Marino and the other 'microstate' teams (Andorra, Liechtenstein, Luxembourg and Malta) being included in the main qualifying groups for said tournaments.

They had a brief moment of glory when they faced England in a World Cup qualifier on 17 November 1993, and took the lead through Davide Gualtieri after just 8.3 seconds—still the fastest goal in World Cup competition. Despite this goal, only San Marino's third at international level, the microstate went on to lose, 7–1.

Until recently, San Marino's international record was one of almost total failure, with famous draws against Turkey and Latvia being the only partial successes in an international career that contains over 70 defeats. However, on 29 April 2004, San Marino recorded their first ever win, with a 1–0 victory over Liechtenstein in an international friendly. Andy Selva scored the only goal in a close game that finally gave this tiny republic a footballing victory.

On 6 September 2006, San Marino suffered their biggest ever defeat, losing 13–0 to world giants Germany in the Stadio Olimpico. It was also the largest goal margin defeat in European Championship Qualifying history. In the same competition on 7 February 2007, they came within 8 seconds of the best result in their history. They were level at 1–1 with the Republic of Ireland after 94 minutes when Stephen Ireland scored within 8 seconds of the final whistle. The goal scored by San Marino was their European Qualifying first goal since losing 4–1 to Austria in 1998.

As of August 2021, San Marino is 210th in the FIFA world rankings—almost last place with 805 points (the bottom is The Turks and Caicos Islands.)

The most notable Sanmarinese footballer was Massimo Bonini, a midfielder, who played for the national team, but most notably for Italy's Juventus FC from 1981 to 1988.

In 2020 San Marino made it through a round for the first time in a UEFA competition making it to the playoffs of the 2022 Futsal EURO.

In the 2024 UEFA Nations League Group D, San Marino achieved its first competitive win against Liechtenstein. They went top of their group and were promoted to Nations League Group C for the first time in their history. This was a significant achievement for the San Marino national team and possibly the best performance by the San Marino national team in its history.

== Motorsport ==
Although named after the Republic, the San Marino Grand Prix of Formula One was actually held at the Autodromo Enzo e Dino Ferrari in the Italian town of Imola, about 100 km northwest of San Marino, along the Via Emilia. It was removed from the sport's calendar in 2007 due to no negotiations to renew the contract with the event organizers. This Grand Prix became etched in infamy after two fatal accidents occurred in 1994, when rookie Roland Ratzenberger and three-time World Champion Ayrton Senna were killed while competing.

San Marino motorcycle Grand Prix has been held during the years in Imola, Misano and Mugello. Currently, Misano hosts both the Grand Prix and the World Superbike Race. Sammarinese Manuel Poggiali won two World Championship titles: 125cc in 2001 and 250cc in 2003. Alex de Angelis has won one 250cc race and was riding in the Moto2 and MotoE classes until retiring in 2020. He is the last Sammarinese rider to appear on a grand prix weekend.

Since 2006, from San Marino starts the FIA Alternative Energies Cup event Ecorally San Marino - Città del Vaticano, organized by the Automobile Club San Marino.

== Baseball ==
San Marino has a professional domestic baseball team, T & A San Marino, which play in the top division of Italian professional baseball, the Serie A1. It has participated in the European Cup tournament for the top European professional baseball teams several times, hosting the event in 1996, 2000 and 2004, 2007 and in 2016 where it co-hosted along with Italy. It won the championship in 2006, 2008 and 2014. It has also more recently achieved 3rd place in the 2017 Regensburg tournament in Germany. Baseball is generally regarded as one of San Marino's more successful sporting fronts when compared to the state's performance in other sports.

== Basketball ==
San Marino also has a vibrant basketball scene. San Marino Basketball Federation (Italian: Federazione Sammarinese Pallacanestro) is the governing body of basketball in San Marino. It was founded in 1968. It organizes the internal league and runs the San Marino national basketball team. There is also an annual international basketball tournament held every summer called San Marino Basketball Cup.

== Volleyball ==
San Marino Volleyball Federation or FSPAV (Italian: Federazione Sammarinese Pallavolo) is the governing body of volleyball and beach volleyball in San Marino. It was formed in 1980. It organizes the internal league and runs the San Marino national volleyball team.

== Rugby union ==
The San Marino team represents the nation at rugby, and the "Rugby Club San Marino" also plays in the Italian leagues.

== Olympic games ==
San Marino have competed at 15 Olympic games since 1960 (with the exception of 1964). The country has won a total of three medals, all at the Tokyo 2020 summer games, where target shooter Alessandra Perilli made San Marino become the smallest sovereign country to win a medal of any color at the games. The country has also appeared at 10 Winter Olympic Games, but have not yet managed to win any medals.

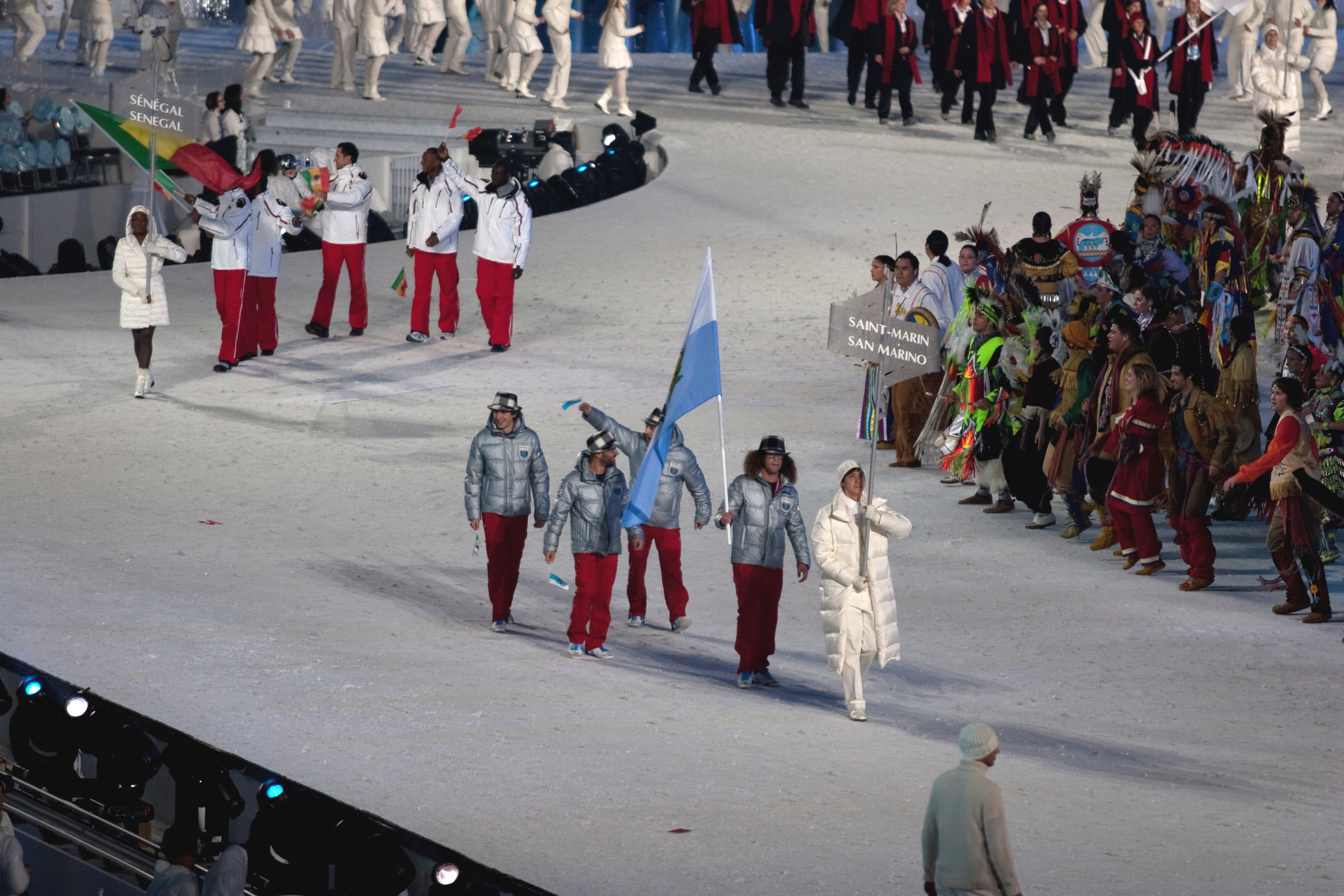
San Marino at the opening ceremony to the 2010 winter games
