= CEV U16 Volleyball European Championship =

International youth volleyball tournament

- Current season, competition or edition: 2025 CEV U16 Volleyball European Championship
- Sport: Volleyball
- Founded: 2017; 9 years ago
- First season: 2017
- No. of teams: 16
- Continent: Europe (CEV)
- Most recent champion: Italy (3rd title)
- Most titles: Italy (3 titles)
- Website: cev.eu

The European Men's U-16 Volleyball Championship is a European volleyball championship for male players under the age of 16, organized by the European Volleyball Confederation and held biannually. Originally, the age limit was 17; with the 2025 edition, the competition age limit was changed from 17 to 16.

== Results summary ==
Year	Host	Final			Third place match		
Year	Host	Champions	Score	Runners-up	Third place	Score	Fourth place
2017	(Turkey); Istanbul	Italy	3–2	Belgium	Turkey	3–0	Bulgaria
2019	(Bulgaria); Sofia	France	3–1	Bulgaria	Poland	3–0	Czech Republic
2021	(Albania); Tirana	Slovenia	3–0	Russia	Poland	3–1	Italy
2023	(Montenegro); Podgorica	Italy	3–1	Bulgaria	Spain	3–1	Belgium
2025; Details	(Armenia); Yerevan	Italy	3–1	Spain	France	3–1	Poland

== Medal table ==
Rank	Nation	Gold	Silver	Bronze	Total
1	Italy	3	0	0	3
2	France	1	0	1	2
3	Slovenia	1	0	0	1
4	Bulgaria	0	2	0	2
5	Spain	0	1	1	2
6	Belgium	0	1	0	1
6	Russia	0	1	0	1
8	Poland	0	0	2	2
9	Turkey	0	0	1	1
Totals (9 entries)		5	5	5	15

== Participating nations ==
Nation	(Turkey) 2017	(Bulgaria) 2019	(Albania) 2021	(Montenegro) 2023	(Armenia) 2025	Years
Albania			12			1
Armenia					16	1
Austria			11	9	13	3
Belarus	6	7				2
Belgium	2nd		7	4		3
Bulgaria	4	2nd	5	2nd	10	5
Czech Republic	10	4	9	15	5	5
Estonia				11		1
Finland	11	10		7		3
France		1st		8	3rd	3
Greece	7	11		10	9	4
Hungary					15	1
Italy	1st	5	4	1st	1st	5
Latvia			8		8	2
Montenegro				16		1
Netherlands	9			14		2
Poland		3rd	3rd	5	4	4
Portugal		9				1
Romania		12			6	2
Russia	5	8	2nd			3
Serbia	8		6	13	14	4
Slovenia			1st	12	11	3
Spain	12			3rd	2nd	3
Turkey	3rd	6	10	6	7	5
Ukraine					12	1
