= 2025 CEV U16 Volleyball European Championship =

5th edition of the U16 Men's European Volleyball Championship

Tournament details
- Host country: Armenia
- City: Yerevan
- Dates: 23 July – 3 August 2025
- Teams: 16 (from 1 confederation)
- Venues: 2 (in 1 host city)

Final positions
- Champions: Italy (3rd title)
- Runners-up: Spain
- Third place: France

The 2025 CEV U16 Volleyball European Championship was the 5th edition of the CEV U16 Volleyball European Championship, organized by Europe's governing volleyball body, the CEV. The tournament was played in Yerevan, Armenia, from 23 July to 3 August 2025. Italy won the competition for the third time. The top seven teams of the tournament qualified for the 2026 FIVB Volleyball Boys' U17 World Championship in Qatar as the CEV representatives.

Players born on or after 1 January 2010 were eligible to participate.

== Host selection ==
Armenia were given the hosting rights on 12 October 2022.

== Qualification ==
Means of qualification		Qualifier
Host country		Armenia
Qualification 1st round	BVA	Turkey
Qualification 1st round	EEVZA	Poland
Qualification 1st round	MEVZA	Czech Republic
Qualification 1st round	WEVZA	France
Qualification 2nd round	Pool A	Bulgaria; Latvia
Qualification 2nd round	Pool B	Spain; Austria
Qualification 2nd round	Pool C	Ukraine; Serbia
Qualification 2nd round	Pool D	Hungary; Slovenia; Romania
Qualification 2nd round	Pool E	Italy; Greece

== Draw ==
The draw of the group stage pools was held on 29 April 2025 in Luxembourg.

== Group stage ==
All times are local (Armenia Time; UTC+4).

=== Pool I ===
Pos	Team	Pld	W	L	Pts	SW	SL	SR	SPW	SPL	SPR	Qualification
1	Poland	7	7	0	19	21	4	5.250	585	430	1.360	Semifinals
2	Spain	7	6	1	18	20	7	2.857	620	507	1.223	Semifinals
3	Romania	7	4	3	12	12	10	1.200	494	500	0.988	
4	Latvia	7	4	3	12	12	11	1.091	492	512	0.961	
5	Greece	7	3	4	10	14	12	1.167	584	573	1.019	
6	Slovenia	7	2	5	8	11	15	0.733	550	572	0.962	
7	Austria	7	2	5	5	7	18	0.389	533	584	0.913	
8	Armenia (H)	7	0	7	0	1	21	0.048	367	547	0.671	

Source: CEV
(H) Host

=== Pool II ===
Pos	Team	Pld	W	L	Pts	SW	SL	SR	SPW	SPL	SPR	Qualification
1	France	7	7	0	18	21	8	2.625	667	580	1.150	Semifinals
2	Italy	7	6	1	17	20	8	2.500	644	552	1.167	Semifinals
3	Czech Republic	7	5	2	15	17	9	1.889	585	518	1.129	
4	Turkey	7	4	3	14	16	12	1.333	618	603	1.025	
5	Bulgaria	7	3	4	9	11	14	0.786	520	568	0.915	
6	Ukraine	7	2	5	7	11	15	0.733	574	584	0.983	
7	Serbia	7	1	6	4	7	19	0.368	519	611	0.849	
8	Hungary	7	0	7	0	3	21	0.143	474	585	0.810	

Source: CEV

== Final Four ==
Semifinals
2 August
Poland	1
Italy	3
2 August
France	2
Spain	3

Final
3 August
Italy	3
Spain	1
3rd place match
3 August
Poland	1
France	3

=== Semifinals ===
Date	Time		Score		Set 1	Set 2	Set 3	Set 4	Set 5	Total	Report
2 August	16:30	Poland	1–3	Italy	19–25	25–16	19–25	20–25		83–91	Report
2 August	19:00	France	2–3	Spain	22–25	13–25	25–20	25–16	12–15	97–101	Report

=== 3rd place match ===
Date	Time		Score		Set 1	Set 2	Set 3	Set 4	Set 5	Total	Report
3 August	16:30	Poland	1–3	France	15–25	25–22	22–25	16–25		78–97	Report

=== Final ===
Date	Time		Score		Set 1	Set 2	Set 3	Set 4	Set 5	Total	Report
3 August	19:00	Italy	3–1	Spain	25–21	18–25	25–23	25–19		93–88	Report

== Final standings ==
Rank	Team
1st place, gold medalist(s)	Italy
2nd place, silver medalist(s)	Spain
3rd place, bronze medalist(s)	France
4	Poland
5	Czech Republic
6	Romania
7	Turkey
8	Latvia
9	Greece
10	Bulgaria
11	Slovenia
12	Ukraine
13	Austria
14	Serbia
15	Hungary
16	Armenia

Qualified for the 2026 FIVB Volleyball Boys' U17 World Championship
Qualified for the 2026 FIVB Volleyball Boys' U17 World Championship as defending champions
