= 2022 Men's U22 European Volleyball Championship =

Tournament details
- Host country: Poland
- Dates: 12–17 July 2022
- Teams: 8
- Venue: 1 (in 1 host city)

Final positions
- Champions: Italy (1st title)

Tournament awards
- MVP: (Italy) Paolo Porro

Tournament statistics
- Matches played: 16
- Attendance: 23,310 (1,457 per match)

The 2022 Men's U22 European Volleyball Championship was the inaugural edition of the Men's U22 European Volleyball Championship, a biennial international volleyball tournament organized by the European Volleyball Confederation (CEV). The tournament was held in Poland (host city Tarnów) from 12 to 17 July 2022.

== Qualification ==
Means of qualification		Qualifier
Host Country		Poland
Qualification round	Pool A	Italy
Qualification round	Pool B	Serbia
Qualification round	Pool C	Turkey
Qualification round	Pool D	France
Qualification round	Pool E	Netherlands
Qualification round	Pool F	Austria
Qualification round	Best runner up	Montenegro

== Pools composition ==
The drawing of lots was held on 1 June 2022.

Pool I	Pool II
Poland	Italy
France	Netherlands
Serbia	Turkey
Austria	Montenegro

== Venue ==
Preliminary round, Final round
Tarnów, Poland	Tarnów is located in Poland
Arena Jaskółka Tarnów	Tarnów is located in Poland
Capacity: 4296	Tarnów is located in Poland

== Preliminary round ==
=== Pool I ===
Pos	Team	Pld	W	L	Pts	SW	SL	SR	SPW	SPL	SPR	Qualification
1	France	3	3	0	6	9	6	1.500	329	323	1.019	Semifinals
2	Poland	3	2	1	7	8	3	2.667	272	238	1.143	Semifinals
3	Serbia	3	1	2	4	5	6	0.833	244	257	0.949	
4	Austria	3	0	3	1	2	9	0.222	237	264	0.898	

Date	Time		Score		Set 1	Set 2	Set 3	Set 4	Set 5	Total	Report
12 Jul	14:30	Serbia	3–0	Austria	27–25	26–24	25–23			78–72	Report
12 Jul	19:30	Poland	2–3	France	25–15	22–25	22–25	28–26	20–22	117–113	Report
13 Jul	14:30	Austria	2–3	France	25–23	25–20	20–25	23–25	10–15	103–108	Report
13 Jul	19:30	Serbia	0–3	Poland	20–25	25–27	18–25			63–77	Report
14 Jul	14:30	France	3–2	Serbia	27–29	25–18	25–19	16–25	15–12	108–103	Report
14 Jul	19:30	Austria	0–3	Poland	19–25	26–28	17–25			62–78	Report

=== Pool II ===
Pos	Team	Pld	W	L	Pts	SW	SL	SR	SPW	SPL	SPR	Qualification
1	Italy	3	3	0	9	9	1	9.000	251	203	1.236	Semifinals
2	Turkey	3	2	1	5	7	5	1.400	276	257	1.074	Semifinals
3	Netherlands	3	1	2	4	5	6	0.833	226	231	0.978	
4	Montenegro	3	0	3	0	0	9	0.000	163	225	0.724	

Date	Time		Score		Set 1	Set 2	Set 3	Set 4	Set 5	Total	Report
12 Jul	12:00	Montenegro	0–3	Netherlands	19–25	13–25	15–25			47–75	Report
12 Jul	17:00	Italy	3–1	Turkey	29–27	25–18	22–25	25–22		101–92	Report
13 Jul	12:00	Netherlands	2–3	Turkey	19–25	18–25	25–21	25–23	9–15	96–109	Report
13 Jul	17:00	Montenegro	0–3	Italy	22–25	15–25	19–25			56–75	Report
14 Jul	12:00	Turkey	3–0	Montenegro	25–22	25–17	25–21			75–60	Report
14 Jul	17:00	Netherlands	0–3	Italy	19–25	19–25	17–25			55–75	Report

== Final round ==
Semifinals
16 July
France	3
Turkey	2
16 July
Italy	3
Poland	2

Final
17 July
France	1
Italy	3
3rd-place match
17 July
Turkey	1
Poland	3

=== Semifinals ===
Date	Time		Score		Set 1	Set 2	Set 3	Set 4	Set 5	Total	Report
16 Jul	17:00	France	3–2	Turkey	25–23	22–25	12–25	25–23	15–13	99–109	Report
16 Jul	20:00	Italy	3–2	Poland	15–25	25–21	19–25	25–16	15–13	99–100	Report

=== 3rd-place match ===
Date	Time		Score		Set 1	Set 2	Set 3	Set 4	Set 5	Total	Report
17 Jul	17:00	Turkey	1–3	Poland	17–25	25–20	24–26	23–25		89–96	Report

=== Final ===
Date	Time		Score		Set 1	Set 2	Set 3	Set 4	Set 5	Total	Report
17 Jul	20:00	France	1–3	Italy	26–24	23–25	22–25	21–25		92–99	Report

== Final standing ==
Rank	Team
1st place, gold medalist(s)	Italy
2nd place, silver medalist(s)	France
3rd place, bronze medalist(s)	Poland
4	Turkey
5	Netherlands
6	Serbia
7	Austria
8	Montenegro

== Awards ==
At the conclusion of the tournament, the following players were selected as the tournament dream team.

- Most valuable player
  (Italy) Paolo Porro
- Best setter
  (France) Kellian Paes
- Best outside spikers
  (Italy) Tommaso Rinaldi
  (Poland) Michał Gierżot
- Best middle blockers
  (Italy) Francesco Comparoni
  (Poland) Karol Urbanowicz
- Best opposite spiker
  (France) Ibrahim Lawani
- Best libero
  (France) Thibault Loubeyre
