= Portugal men's national under-21 volleyball team =

Portugal U21
- Association: Federação Portuguesa de Voleibol
- Confederation: CEV

Uniforms
Home	Away	Third

FIVB U21 World Championship
- Appearances: No Appearances

Europe U21 / U20 Championship
- Appearances: Data uncompleted
- www.fpvoleibol.pt (in Portuguese)

The Portugal men's national under-21 volleyball team represents Portugal in international men's volleyball competitions and friendly matches under the age 21 and it is ruled by the Federação Portuguesa de Voleibol body that is an affiliate of the Federation of International Volleyball FIVB and also part of the European Volleyball Confederation CEV.

== Results ==
=== FIVB U21 World Championship ===
Champions Runners up Third place Fourth place

FIVB U21 World Championship
Year	Round	Position	Pld	W	L	SW	SL	Squad
(Brazil) 1977	Didn't qualify							
(United States) 1981	Didn't qualify							
(Italy) 1985	Didn't qualify							
(Bahrain) 1987	Didn't qualify							
(Greece) 1989	Didn't qualify							
(Egypt) 1991	Didn't qualify							
(Argentina) 1993	Didn't qualify							
(Malaysia) 1995	Didn't qualify							
(Bahrain) 1997	Didn't qualify							
(Thailand) 1999	Didn't qualify							
(Poland) 2001	Didn't qualify							
(Iran) 2003	Didn't qualify							
(India) 2005	Didn't qualify							
(Morocco) 2007	Didn't qualify							
(India) 2009	Didn't qualify							
(Brazil) 2011	Didn't qualify							
(Turkey) 2013	Didn't qualify							
(Mexico) 2015	Didn't qualify							
(Czech Republic) 2017	Didn't qualify							
(Bahrain) 2019	Didn't qualify							
(Italy) (Bulgaria) 2021	Didn't qualify							
(Bahrain) 2023	Didn't qualify							
(China) 2025	Didn't qualify							
Total	0 Titles	0/23						

== Team ==
=== Current squad ===
The following players are the Portuguese players that have competed in the 2018 Men's U20 Volleyball European Championship

#	name	position	height	weight	birthday	spike	block
	araujo david	outside-spiker	189	89	2000.3.6	330	312
	belo jose	middle-blocker	191	85	1999.11.28	340	318
	campos hugo	setter	185	75	2000.11.8	320	308
	fernandes rui	setter	191	72	2000.3.30	317	305
	ferreira alvaro	setter	181	85	2000.10.1	318	295
	marques andre	outside-spiker	189	71	2000.11.28	330	317
	meirinho manuel	opposite	203	94	1999.10.30	325	310
	menezes guilherme	middle-blocker	196	93	2000.5.9	335	315
	moreira alexandre	middle-blocker	195	88	2001.1.8	320	305
	moreira guilherme	outside-spiker	185	86	1999.10.9	325	310
	mykolyshyn maksym	outside-spiker	190	82	1999.11.28	320	308
	pedrosa joao	outside-spiker	192	73	2000.8.20	325	307
	peixoto miguel	libero	169	67	2000.9.13	295	280
	pereira joao	middle-blocker	192	93	1999.8.3	335	315
	reis afonso	setter	181	78	1999.9.3	310	290
	rodrigues manuel	setter	184	70	1999.9.24	333	309
	sa miguel	libero	179	73	2000.1.1	300	285
	sampaio marco	opposite	194	98	2001.5.29	320	310
	santos francisco	outside-spiker	191	68	2001.6.4	318	305
	santos rafael	outside-spiker	184	74	2001.4.19	327	310
	simoes joao	libero	177	76	1999.9.13	315	303
	sinfronio miguel	middle-blocker	194	89	1999.6.30	336	318
