= CEV U22 Volleyball European Championship =

- Sport: Volleyball
- Founded: 2022; 4 years ago
- First season: 2022
- No. of teams: 8
- Continent: Europe (CEV)
- Most recent champions: Czech Republic (1st title)
- Most titles: Italy; France; Czech Republic(1 title each)
- Website: cev.eu

The CEV U22 Volleyball European Championship is a volleyball competition for men's national teams with players under the age of 22 years, currently held biannually and organized by the European Volleyball Confederation, the confederation for Europe.

== Results summary ==
Year	Host	Final			Third place match			Teams
Year	Host	Champions	Score	Runners-up	3rd place	Score	4th place	Teams
2022; Details	Poland	Italy	3–1	France	Poland	3–1	Turkey	8
2024; Details	Netherlands	France	3–2	Italy	Poland	3–2	Netherlands	8
2026; Details	Portugal	Czech Republic	3–1	Poland	Israel	3–0	France	8

== Medal summary ==
Rank	Nation	Gold	Silver	Bronze	Total
1	France	1	1	0	2
1	Italy	1	1	0	2
3	Czech Republic	1	0	0	1
4	Poland	0	1	2	3
5	Israel	0	0	1	1
Totals (5 entries)		3	3	3	9

== Participating nations ==
Nation	(Poland) 2022	(Netherlands) 2024	(Portugal) 2026	Years
Austria	7th			1
Bulgaria			8th	1
Czech Republic		7th	1st	2
France	2nd	1st	4th	3
Hungary		6th		1
Italy	1st	2nd	6th	3
Israel			3rd	1
Montenegro	8th			1
Netherlands	5th	4th		2
Poland	3rd	3rd	2nd	3
Portugal		5th	7th	1
Spain		8th		1
Serbia	6th			1
Turkey	4th			1
Ukraine			5th	1
