= European Volleyball Confederation =

Sports governing body

- Confédération Européenne de Volleyball (French)
- Jurisdiction: International
- Membership: 56 member associations
- Abbreviation: CEV
- Founded: 1963; 63 years ago
- Affiliation: FIVB
- Headquarters: Luxembourg City, Luxembourg
- Location: Europe
- President: (Croatia) Roko Sikirić

Official website
- www.cev.eu

The European Volleyball Confederation (French: Confédération Européenne de Volleyball), also known by its French acronym CEV, is the continental governing body for the sports of indoor volleyball, beach volleyball and snow volleyball in Europe. Its headquarters is in Luxembourg City, Luxembourg.

== Profile ==
Although the CEV was formed on 21 October 1963, in Bucharest, Romania volleyball became popular in Europe many years before. The majority of the teams that attended the Congress which eventually led to the foundation of the FIVB in 1947 were from this continent. The foundation is supposed to have been a move on the part of European national federations.

Volleyball was invented in the United States and became an extremely popular sport in eastern Europe when introduced by American soldiers during World War I. By the middle of the century, it had spread through the rest of the continent. Many techniques and tactics commonplace in modern volleyball were introduced by European teams.

The long and significant tradition of the sport in the continent may at least partially account for the administrative structure employed by the CEV, which rivals the FIVB's in size and comprehensiveness. It is the biggest of all volleyball confederations and organizes the most annual competitions and tournaments. As of 2005, its headquarters are located in Luxembourg.

As the presiding entity over European volleyball federations, the CEV organizes continental competitions such as the prestigious European Championship (first edition, 1948), the CEV Cup and the European League. It participates in the organization of qualification tournaments for major events such as the Olympic Games, men's and women's world championships and international competitions of its affiliated federations.

The CEV family increased its membership to 56 Federations following the approval of Kosovo on the opening day of the 35th FIVB World Congress held on 5 October 2016, in Buenos Aires, Argentina.

In response to the 2022 Russian invasion of Ukraine, the CEV banned all Russian national teams, clubs and officials from participating in European competition, and suspended all Russians from their respective functions in CEV organs. It also canceled all competitions in Russia. In March 2026, the CEV allowed the Russian youth national teams to participate in tournaments with a flag and an anthem. In July 2026, this ban was completely lifted.

== Affiliated federations ==
As of 2022, the following 56 national federations are CEV affiliates, listed alphabetically.

Code	Nation	Federation
ALB	Albania	Federata Shqiptare e Volejbollit
AND	Andorra	Federació Andorrana de Voleibol
ARM	Armenia	Hayastani Voleyboli Federats’ia
AUT	Austria	Österreichischer Volleyball Verband
AZE	Azerbaijan	Azərbaycan Voleybol Federasiyası
BLR	Belarus	Bielaruskaja Fiederacjya Valiejbola
BEL	Belgium	Fédération Royale Belge de Volleyball
BIH	Bosnia and Herzegovina	Odbojkaški savez Bosne i Hercegovine
BUL	Bulgaria	Bulgarska Federatsiya Volejbol
CRO	Croatia	Hrvatski odbojkaški savez
CYP	Cyprus	Kypriakí Omospondía Petosfaírisis
CZE	Czech Republic	Český Volejbalový Svaz
DEN	Denmark	Dansk Volleyball Forbund
ENG	England	Volleyball England
EST	Estonia	Eesti Võrkpalli Liit
FAR	Faroe Islands	Flogbóltssamband Føroya
FIN	Finland	Suomen Lentopalloliitto F. Y.
FRA	France	Fédération Française de Volleyball
GEO	Georgia	Sakartvelos Prenburtis Pedaratsia
GER	Germany	Deutscher Volleyball Verband
GIB	Gibraltar	Gibraltar Volleyball Association
GRE	Greece	Ellinikí Omospondía Petosfaírisis
GRL	Greenland	Kalaallit Nunaanni Volleyballertartut Kattuffiat
HUN	Hungary	Magyar Röplabda Szövetség
ISL	Iceland	Blaksamband Íslands
IRL	Ireland	Volleyball Ireland
ISR	Israel	Igud HaKadur'af BeIsrael
ITA	Italy	Federazione Italiana Pallavolo
KOS	Kosovo	Federata e Volejbollit e Kosovës
LAT	Latvia	Latvijas volejbola federācija
LIE	Liechtenstein	Liechtensteiner Volleyball Verband
LTU	Lithuania	Lietuvos tinklinio federacija
LUX	Luxembourg	Fédération Luxembourgeoise de Volleyball
MLT	Malta	Malta Volleyball Association
MLD	Moldova	Federaţia Moldovenească de Volei
MON	Monaco	Fédération Monégasque de Volleyball
MNE	Montenegro	Odbojkaški savez Crne Gore
NED	Netherlands	Nederlandse Volleybalbond
MKD	North Macedonia	Odbojkarska Federacija na Makedonija
NIR	Northern Ireland	Northern Ireland Volleyball Association
NOR	Norway	Norges Volleyballforbund
POL	Poland	Polski Związek Piłki Siatkowej
POR	Portugal	Federação Portuguesa de Voleibol
ROU	Romania	Federaţia Română de Volei
RUS	Russia	Federetsiya Voleybola Rossii
SMR	San Marino	Federazione Sammarinese Pallavolo
SCO	Scotland	Scottish Volleyball Association
SRB	Serbia	Odbojkaški savez Srbije
SVK	Slovakia	Slovenská Volejbalová Federácia
SLO	Slovenia	Odbojkarska Zveza Slovenije
ESP	Spain	Real Federación Española de Voleibol
SWE	Sweden	Svenska Volleybollförbundet
SUI	Switzerland	Swiss Volley
TUR	Turkey	Türkiye Voleybol Federasyonu
UKR	Ukraine	Ukrayins'ka Federetsiya Voleybolu
WAL	Wales	Pêl-foli Cymru

== FIVB world rankings ==
FIVB Men's Rankings (as of 3 August 2026)
CEV*	FIVB	±	National Team	Points
1	1	Steady	Poland	407.56
2	2	Steady	Italy	355.84
3	3	Steady	Russia	352.1
4	4	Steady	Slovenia	344.53
5	8	Steady	France	302.59
6	9	Steady	Bulgaria	272.25
7	10	Steady	Turkey	268.49
8	11	Steady	Ukraine	247.16
9	12	Steady	Germany	241.87
10	13	Steady	Serbia	234.98
11	16	Steady	Finland	218.01
12	17	Steady	Belgium	211.6
13	20	Steady	Czech Republic	203.22
14	21	Steady	Netherlands	194.97
15	23	Steady	Greece	148.96
16	25	Steady	Portugal	138.86
17	28	Steady	Switzerland	134.76
18	29	Steady	Israel	133.53
19	30	Steady	Estonia	133.14
20	31	Steady	Denmark	130.66
21	33	Steady	Romania	124.47
22	34	Steady	Spain	121.73
23	36	Steady	Belarus	120.51
24	39	Steady	Sweden	113.41
25	40	Steady	Croatia	112.96
26	42	Steady	Slovakia	108.8
27	47	Steady	Hungary	94.3
28	50	Steady	Latvia	92.47
29	54	▼1	North Macedonia	83.17
30	56	Steady	Austria	77.03
31	57	Steady	San Marino	74.81
32	60	Steady	Scotland	67.7
33	65	Steady	Montenegro	64.18
34	72	Steady	Cyprus	56.82
35	81	▼2	Albania	52.21
36	95	▼5	Liechtenstein	42.98
37	96	▼5	Norway	42.9
38	97	▼5	Norway	42.78
39	100	▼5	Northern Ireland	41.75
40	111	▼5	Faroe Islands	34.91
41	125	▼5	Luxembourg	19.71
42	130	▼5	Kosovo	16.43
*Local rankings based on FIVB ranking points

FIVB Women's Rankings (as of 24 May 2026)
CEV*	FIVB	±	National Team	Points
1	1	Steady	Italy	484.15
2	3	Steady	Turkey	368.09
3	4	Steady	Poland	359.85
4	8	Steady	Netherlands	270.58
5	9	Steady	Serbia	261.31
6	10	Steady	Germany	254.86
7	13	Steady	France	222.91
8	14	Steady	Belgium	211.23
9	15	Steady	Czech Republic	194.3
10	16	Steady	Ukraine	190.2
11	20	Steady	Slovenia	161.08
12	24	Steady	Romania	148.02
13	25	Steady	Bulgaria	144.25
14	26	Steady	Sweden	141.12
15	29	▲2	Hungary	131.98
16	30	▼1	Greece	131.02
17	31	▼1	Spain	130.15
18	32	▲4	Croatia	113.88
19	33	▼1	Switzerland	113.7
20	34	▼1	Slovakia	112.34
21	36	▼2	Finland	108.01
22	40	▲1	Portugal	95.83
23	41	▼2	Austria	92.88
24	42	Steady	Bosnia and Herzegovina	89.95
25	43	Steady	Montenegro	88.37
26	48	Steady	Azerbaijan	73.52
27	58	▼1	Latvia	62.17
28	59	▼1	Israel	58.28
29	62	▼1	Ireland	51.31
30	68	▼2	Estonia	45.36
31	81	▼5	Georgia	27.91
32	84	▼4	Kosovo	26.61
33	89	▼5	North Macedonia	18.69
34	90	▼5	Iceland	16.33
35	91	▼5	Denmark	14.33
36	94	▼6	Luxembourg	7.8
*Local rankings based on FIVB ranking points

== Competitions ==
=== Volleyball ===
National teams:

Men

- EuroVolley
- Men's European Volleyball League
- CEV U22 Volleyball European Championship
- CEV U20 Volleyball European Championship
- CEV U18 Volleyball European Championship
- CEV U16 Volleyball European Championship

Women

- EuroVolley
- Women's European Volleyball League
- CEV Women's U22 Volleyball European Championship
- CEV Women's U20 Volleyball European Championship
- CEV Women's U18 Volleyball European Championship
- CEV Women's U16 Volleyball European Championship

Clubs:

Men

- CEV Champions League
- CEV Cup
- CEV Challenge Cup

Women

- CEV Women's Champions League
- Women's CEV Cup
- CEV Women's Challenge Cup

=== Beach volleyball ===
Championship:

- European Beach Volleyball Championships
- European U22 Beach Volleyball Championships (U23 until 2013)
- European U20 Beach Volleyball Championships
- European U18 Beach Volleyball Championships

Tour

- European Beach Volleyball Tour

=== Snow volleyball ===
- European Snow Volleyball Championships
- European Snow Volleyball Tour

== Title holders ==
=== Volleyball ===
	Championship	League	U22	U20	U18	U16	Champions League	CEV Cup	Challenge Cup
Men	Poland (2023)	Finland (2026)	Czech Republic (2026)	France (2024)	Poland (2026)	Italy (2025)	(Italy) Sir Safety Umbria Perugia (2025–26)	(Italy) Gas Sales Bluenergy Piacenza (2025–26)	(Italy) Allianz Milano (2025–26)
Women	Turkey (2026)	Sweden (2026)	Italy (2026)	Turkey (2024)	Italy (2026)	Poland (2025)	(Turkey) VakifBank Istanbul (2025–26)	(Turkey) Galatasaray Daikin (2025–26)	(Italy) Megabox Group Vallefoglia (2025–26)

== Zonal associations ==
=== Zones ===
The CEV is divided into six zonal associations largely based on geography:

1. Balkan Volleyball Association (BVA) (1998) – 11 national federations, BVA Cup
2. Eastern European Volleyball Zonal Association (EEVZA) (2005) – 10 national federations
3. Middle European Volleyball Zonal Association (MEVZA) (2002) – 8+1 national federations, MEVZA League
4. North European Volleyball Zonal Association (NEVZA) (2002) – 8 national federations
5. Western European Volleyball Zonal Association (WEVZA) (2013) – 8 national federations
6. Small Countries Association (SCA) (1986) – 13+2 national federations, SCA Championship
- The Faroe Islands, Greenland and Iceland are members of the NEVZA and SCA. Cyprus members of the MEVZA and SCA.

=== Members ===
1. ALB,BIH,BUL,GRE,KOS,MDA,MKD,MNE,ROU,SRB,TUR
2. ARM,AZE,BLR,EST,GEO,LAT,LTU,POL,RUS,UKR
3. AUT,CRO,CYP,CZE,HUN,ISR,LUX,SVK,SLO
4. DEN,ENG,FRO,FIN,GRL,ISL,NOR,SWE
5. BEL,FRA,GER,ITA,NED,POR,ESP,SUI
6. MLT,SMR,GIB,AND,MON,LIE,LUX,WAL,IRL,NIR,SCO+ISL,GRL,FRO,CYP

== Sponsors ==
Sponsors of CEV
Mikasa Sports, Sberbank, DenizBank, DHL, Gerflor
