= 2025 Asian Men's U16 Volleyball Championship =

Volleyball competition held in Nakhon Pathom, Thailand

- Official logo

Tournament details
- Host country: Thailand
- Cities: Nakhon Pathom; Ratchaburi
- Dates: 12–19 July
- Teams: 16
- Venue: 2 (in 2 host cities)

Final positions
- Champions: Pakistan (1st title)
- Runners-up: Iran
- Third place: India
- Fourth place: Japan

Tournament awards
- MVP: (Pakistan) Faizan Ullah
- Best Setter: (Iran) Aidin Pouzesh
- Best OH: (Pakistan) Faizan Ullah; (Iran) Azhvan Namazi
- Best MB: (Iran) Maziar Fallahkharyeki; (Pakistan) Wahab Abdullah
- Best OPP: (Pakistan) Muhammad Junaid
- Best Libero: (India) Shabad Gautam

Tournament statistics
- Matches played: 56
- Attendance: 15,090 (269 per match)

The 2025 Asian Men's U16 Volleyball Championship was the second edition of the Asian Men's U16 Volleyball Championship, a biennial international volleyball tournament organised by Asian Volleyball Confederation (AVC) with Thailand Volleyball Association (TVA). It was held in Nakhon Pathom, Thailand from 12 to 19 July 2025.

This tournament served as a qualification tournament for the FIVB Volleyball Boys' U17 World Championship. The top four teams of the tournament qualified for the 2026 FIVB Volleyball Boys' U17 World Championship as the AVC representatives.

Players must be born on or after January 1, 2010.

== Host selection ==
The Asian Volleyball Confederation (AVC) announced on its Facebook page that Thailand was awarded the hosting rights on December 19, 2024.

== Team ==
=== Qualification ===
On 3 February 2025 Malaysia Volleyball Association announce 18 teams registered to AVC to compete in AVC U16 Championship.

Following AVC regulation, total of 16 teams in any AVC event will be selected by the followings:

- 1 team for the Organizer
- 10 teams based on the rankings of the previous championship
- 5 teams from each of 5 zones (with a qualification tournament if needed)

==== Southeast Asian qualification ====
Southeast Asian qualification were held in Sentul, Bogor on 25 May 2025. From SAVA zone there were originally 3 teams, but Philippines withdrew from the qualification.

- Indonesia
- Malaysia
- ~~Philippines~~

Date	Time		Score		Set 1	Set 2	Set 3	Set 4	Set 5	Total	Report
25 May	19:00	Indonesia	3–2	Malaysia	24–26	25–10	22–25	25–22	15–8	111–91	Report

=== Qualified teams ===
Country	Zone	Qualified as	Qualified on	Appearances			Previous best performance
Country	Zone	Qualified as	Qualified on	Total	First	Last	Previous best performance
Thailand	SAVA	Host country	19 December 2024	2	2023		7th place (2023)
Iran	CAVA	Defending champions	29 July 2023	2	2023		Champions (2023)
Uzbekistan	CAVA	2023 U16 Championship runners-up	29 July 2023	2	2023		Runners-up (2023)
Chinese Taipei	EAVA	2023 U16 Championship 3rd placers	29 July 2023	2	2023		3rd place (2023)
Pakistan	CAVA	2023 U16 Championship 4th placers	29 July 2023	2	2023		4th place (2023)
Japan	EAVA	2023 U16 Championship 5th placers	29 July 2023	2	2023		5th place (2023)
Kazakhstan	CAVA	2023 U16 Championship 6th placers	29 July 2023	2	2023		6th place (2023)
Australia	OZVA	2023 U16 Championship 8th placers	29 July 2023	2	2023		8th place (2023)
China	EAVA	2023 U16 Championship 9th placers	29 July 2023	2	2023		9th place (2023)
Mongolia	EAVA	2023 U16 Championship 10th placers	29 July 2023	2	2023		10th place (2023)
Hong Kong	EAVA	2023 U16 Championship 11th placers	29 July 2023	2	2023		11th place (2023)
Saudi Arabia	WAVA	2023 U16 Championship 12th placers	29 July 2023	2	2023		12th place (2023)
India	CAVA	Additional entrant teams from CAVA	3 February 2025	1	None		Debut
South Korea	EAVA	Additional entrant teams from EAVA	3 February 2025	1	None		Debut
Indonesia	SAVA	SAVA qualifier winner	25 May 2025	1	None		Debut
United Arab Emirates	WAVA	Additional entrant teams from WAVA	1 July 2025	1	None		Debut

== Pool composition ==
The draw of lots took place on 25 May 2025 at the Edsa Shangri-La, Manila in Mandaluyong, Philippines.

Pool A	Pool B	Pool C	Pool D
Thailand (H)	Iran (1)	Uzbekistan (2)	Chinese Taipei (3)
Australia (8)	Kazakhstan (6)	Japan (5)	Pakistan (4)
China	Hong Kong	Mongolia	South Korea
India	Indonesia	United Arab Emirates	Saudi Arabia

== Format ==
In preliminary round, all teams are divided into four pools (A, B, C, & D) with four teams each. The teams battled in a single round-robin with the top two teams in each pool qualified to 1st–8th classification while bottom two teams qualified to 9th–16th classification.

In classification round, all teams in each pools (E, F, G, & H) battle again in a single round-robin where top two teams in pools E and F qualify to semifinals and the two bottom teams qualify to 5th–8th places, while the top two teams in pools G and H qualify to 9th–12th places and 13th–16th places, respectively. Teams who faced each other in the preliminary will not play again rather their win-loss record will carry over.

In final round, the teams battle in knockout format.

== Venues ==
Preliminary, Classification, 1st–8th places	Preliminary, Classification, 9th–16th places
Nakhon Pathom	Ratchaburi
Nakhon Pathom Gymnasium	Ratchaburi Gymnasium
Capacity: 4,000	Capacity: 4,000

== Pool standing procedure ==
1. Number of Victories
2. Match points
3. Set quotient
4. Points quotient
5. If the tie continues as per the point quotient between two teams, the priority will be given to the team which won the last match between them. When the tie in points quotient is between three or more teams, a new classification of these teams in the terms of points 1, 2 and 3 will be made taking into consideration only the matches in which they were opposed to each other.

Match won 3–0 or 3–1: 3 match points for the winner, 0 match points for the loser
Match won 3–2: 2 match points for the winner, 1 match point for the loser

== Preliminary round ==
- All times are Indochina Time (UTC+07:00).

=== Pool A ===
Pos	Team	Pld	W	L	Pts	SW	SL	SR	SPW	SPL	SPR	Qualification
1	India	3	3	0	9	9	0	MAX	226	170	1.329	Pool E
2	Thailand (H)	3	2	1	6	6	5	1.200	233	179	1.302	Pool E
3	China	3	1	2	3	4	6	0.667	213	228	0.934	Pool G
4	Australia	3	0	3	0	0	9	0.000	150	227	0.661	Pool G

Source: FIVB
(H) Host

Date	Time	Venue		Score		Set 1	Set 2	Set 3	Set 4	Set 5	Total	Report
12 Jul	15:00	NPG	Australia	0–3	China	18–25	13–25	25–27			56–77	P2 Report
12 Jul	17:30	NPG	Thailand	0–3	India	20–25	22–25	20–25			62–75	P2 Report
13 Jul	12:30	NPG	India	3–0	Australia	25–16	25–17	25–18			75–51	P2 Report
13 Jul	17:30	NPG	Thailand	3–1	China	21–25	25–20	25–15	25–19		96–79	P2 Report
14 Jul	12:30	NPG	China	0–3	India	18–25	24–26	15–25			57–76	P2 Report
14 Jul	17:30	NPG	Thailand	3–0	Australia	25–15	25–10	25–18			75–43	P2 Report

=== Pool B ===
Pos	Team	Pld	W	L	Pts	SW	SL	SR	SPW	SPL	SPR	Qualification
1	Iran	3	3	0	9	9	1	9.000	247	189	1.307	Pool F
2	Indonesia	3	2	1	6	7	4	1.750	257	210	1.224	Pool F
3	Kazakhstan	3	1	2	3	4	6	0.667	188	223	0.843	Pool H
4	Hong Kong	3	0	3	0	0	9	0.000	155	225	0.689	Pool H

Source: FIVB

Date	Time	Venue		Score		Set 1	Set 2	Set 3	Set 4	Set 5	Total	Report
12 Jul	10:00	NPG	Kazakhstan	3–0	Hong Kong	25–16	25–17	25–22			75–55	P2 Report
12 Jul	12:30	NPG	Iran	3–1	Indonesia	21–25	25–21	25–19	26–24		97–89	P2 Report
13 Jul	10:00	NPG	Indonesia	3–1	Kazakhstan	25–14	25–15	18–25	25–11		93–65	P2 Report
13 Jul	15:00	NPG	Iran	3–0	Hong Kong	25–20	25–15	25–17			75–52	P2 Report
14 Jul	10:00	NPG	Hong Kong	0–3	Indonesia	15–25	13–25	20–25			48–75	P2 Report
14 Jul	15:00	NPG	Iran	3–0	Kazakhstan	25–11	25–16	25–21			75–48	P2 Report

=== Pool C ===
Pos	Team	Pld	W	L	Pts	SW	SL	SR	SPW	SPL	SPR	Qualification
1	Japan	3	3	0	9	9	0	MAX	225	104	2.163	Pool E
2	Uzbekistan	3	2	1	6	6	3	2.000	202	137	1.474	Pool E
3	Mongolia	3	1	2	3	3	6	0.500	190	151	1.258	Pool G
4	United Arab Emirates (Note: United Arab Emirates failed to appear at the competition venue, thus forfeiting all of their matches in the tournament. This was the original match result between UAE and UZB: 3–0 (25–16, 25–17, 25–9).) (D)	3	0	3	0	0	9	0.000	0	225	0.000	Pool G

Source: FIVB
(D) Disqualified
Notes:

Date	Time	Venue		Score		Set 1	Set 2	Set 3	Set 4	Set 5	Total	Report
12 Jul	15:00	RG	Uzbekistan	3–0	United Arab Emirates	25–0	25–0	25–0			75–0	P2 Report
12 Jul	17:30	RG	Japan	3–0	Mongolia	25–13	25–20	25–20			75–53	P2 Report
13 Jul	12:30	RG	United Arab Emirates	0–3	Japan	0–25	0–25	0–25			0–75	P2 Report
13 Jul	17:30	RG	Uzbekistan	3–0	Mongolia	26–24	25–19	25–19			76–62	P2 Report
14 Jul	12:30	RG	Mongolia	3–0	United Arab Emirates	25–0	25–0	25–0			75–0	P2 Report
14 Jul	17:30	RG	Uzbekistan	0–3	Japan	16–25	19–25	16–25			51–75	P2 Report

=== Pool D ===
Pos	Team	Pld	W	L	Pts	SW	SL	SR	SPW	SPL	SPR	Qualification
1	Pakistan	3	3	0	9	9	0	MAX	150	82	1.829	Pool F
2	South Korea	3	2	1	5	6	5	1.200	220	204	1.078	Pool F
3	Chinese Taipei	3	1	2	4	5	6	0.833	174	156	1.115	Pool H
4	Saudi Arabia	3	0	3	0	0	9	0.000	101	225	0.449	Pool H

Source: FIVB

Date	Time	Venue		Score		Set 1	Set 2	Set 3	Set 4	Set 5	Total	Report
12 Jul	10:00	RG	Chinese Taipei	3–0	Saudi Arabia	25–11	25–20	25–23			75–54	P2 Report
12 Jul	12:30	RG	Pakistan	3–0	South Korea	25–16	25–19	25–8			75–43	P2 Report
13 Jul	10:00	RG	Chinese Taipei	2–3	South Korea	21–25	16–25	25–21	25–16	12–15	99–102	P2 Report
13 Jul	15:00	RG	Saudi Arabia	0–3	Pakistan	14–25	13–25	12–25			39–75	P2 Report
14 Jul	10:00	RG	South Korea	3–0	Saudi Arabia	25–11	25–11	25–8			75–30	P2 Report
14 Jul	15:00	RG	Chinese Taipei	0–3	Pakistan	24–26	14–25	16–25			54–76	P2 Report

== Classification round ==
- All times are Indochina Time (UTC+07:00).
- The results and the points of the matches between the same teams that were already played during the preliminary round shall be taken into account for the classification round.

=== Pool E ===
Pos	Team	Pld	W	L	Pts	SW	SL	SR	SPW	SPL	SPR	Qualification
1	Japan	3	3	0	9	9	1	9.000	248	183	1.355	Final four
2	India	3	2	1	5	7	5	1.400	252	260	0.969	Final four
3	Thailand	3	1	2	3	3	7	0.429	215	230	0.935	5th–8th places
4	Uzbekistan	3	0	3	1	3	9	0.333	231	273	0.846	5th–8th places

Source: FIVB

Date	Time	Venue		Score		Set 1	Set 2	Set 3	Set 4	Set 5	Total	Report
16 Jul	15:00	NPG	Japan	3–0	Thailand	25–22	25–19	25–16			75–57	P2 Report
16 Jul	17:30	NPG	India	3–2	Uzbekistan	25–21	25–16	19–25	18–25	15–13	102–100	P2 Report
17 Jul	15:00	NPG	Thailand	3–1	Uzbekistan	25–22	25–15	21–25	25–18		96–80	P2 Report
17 Jul	17:30	NPG	India	1–3	Japan	25–23	15–25	12–25	23–25		75–98	P2 Report

=== Pool F ===
Pos	Team	Pld	W	L	Pts	SW	SL	SR	SPW	SPL	SPR	Qualification
1	Pakistan	3	3	0	9	9	1	9.000	253	202	1.252	Final four
2	Iran	3	2	1	6	7	5	1.400	295	284	1.039	Final four
3	South Korea	3	1	2	2	4	8	0.500	237	274	0.865	5th–8th places
4	Indonesia	3	0	3	1	3	9	0.333	249	274	0.909	5th–8th places

Source: FIVB

Date	Time	Venue		Score		Set 1	Set 2	Set 3	Set 4	Set 5	Total	Report
16 Jul	10:00	NPG	Iran	3–1	South Korea	25–21	27–29	25–22	25–20		102–92	P2 Report
16 Jul	12:30	NPG	Pakistan	3–0	Indonesia	25–23	25–20	25–20			75–63	P2 Report
17 Jul	10:00	NPG	Indonesia	2–3	South Korea	17–25	20–25	25–20	25–17	10–15	97–102	P2 Report
17 Jul	12:30	NPG	Iran	1–3	Pakistan	23–25	19–25	25–22	29–31		96–103	P2 Report

=== Pool G ===
Pos	Team	Pld	W	L	Pts	SW	SL	SR	SPW	SPL	SPR	Qualification
1	Mongolia	3	3	0	9	9	0	MAX	226	121	1.868	9th–12th places
2	China	3	2	1	6	6	3	2.000	216	132	1.636	9th–12th places
3	Australia	3	1	2	3	3	6	0.500	188	152	1.237	13th–16th places

Source: FIVB

Date	Time	Venue		Score		Set 1	Set 2	Set 3	Set 4	Set 5	Total	Report
16 Jul	10:00	RG	China	3–0	Bye	25–0	25–0	25–0			75–0	P2 Report
16 Jul	12:30	RG	Mongolia	3–0	Australia	25–21	25–19	25–17			75–57	P2 Report
17 Jul	10:00	RG	Australia	3–0	Bye	25–0	25–0	25–0			75–0	P2 Report
17 Jul	12:30	RG	China	0–3	Mongolia	19–25	24–26	21–25			64–76	P2 Report

=== Pool H ===
Pos	Team	Pld	W	L	Pts	SW	SL	SR	SPW	SPL	SPR	Qualification
1	Chinese Taipei	3	3	0	9	9	0	MAX	225	162	1.389	9th–12th places
2	Kazakhstan	3	2	1	6	6	4	1.500	226	209	1.081	9th–12th places
3	Saudi Arabia	3	1	2	3	4	7	0.571	232	255	0.910	13th–16th places
4	Hong Kong	3	0	3	0	1	9	0.111	192	249	0.771	13th–16th places

Source: FIVB

Date	Time	Venue		Score		Set 1	Set 2	Set 3	Set 4	Set 5	Total	Report
16 Jul	15:00	RG	Kazakhstan	3–1	Saudi Arabia	25–23	25–14	23–25	25–17		98–79	P2 Report
16 Jul	17:30	RG	Chinese Taipei	3–0	Hong Kong	25–15	25–21	25–19			75–55	P2 Report
17 Jul	15:00	RG	Hong Kong	1–3	Saudi Arabia	23–25	17–25	26–24	16–25		82–99	P2 Report
17 Jul	17:30	RG	Kazakhstan	0–3	Chinese Taipei	16–25	22–25	15–25			53–75	P2 Report

== Final round ==
- All times are Indochina Time (UTC+07:00).

=== 13th–16th places ===
13th–16th semifinals
18 July
Australia	3
Hong Kong	2
18 July
Saudi Arabia	3
Bye	0

13th place match
19 July
Australia	3
Saudi Arabia	2
15th place match
19 July
Hong Kong	3
Bye	0

==== 13th–16th semifinals ====
Date	Time	Venue		Score		Set 1	Set 2	Set 3	Set 4	Set 5	Total	Report
18 Jul	10:00	RG	Saudi Arabia	3–0	Bye	25–0	25–0	25–0			75–0	P2 Report
18 Jul	12:30	RG	Australia	3–2	Hong Kong	12–25	25–19	25–23	21–25	16–14	99–106	P2 Report

==== 15th place match ====
Date	Time	Venue		Score		Set 1	Set 2	Set 3	Set 4	Set 5	Total	Report
18 Jul	—	RG	Hong Kong	3–0	Bye	25–0	25–0	25–0			75–0	P2 Report

==== 13th place match ====
Date	Time	Venue		Score		Set 1	Set 2	Set 3	Set 4	Set 5	Total	Report
19 Jul	10:00	RG	Australia	3–2	Saudi Arabia	25–20	23–25	23–25	25–22	15–13	111–105	P2 Report

=== 9th–12th places ===
9th–12th semifinals
18 July
Mongolia	3
Kazakhstan	2
18 July
Chinese Taipei	3
China	2

9th place match
19 July
Mongolia	1
Chinese Taipei	3
11th place match
19 July
Kazakhstan	2
China	3

==== 9th–12th semifinals ====
Date	Time	Venue		Score		Set 1	Set 2	Set 3	Set 4	Set 5	Total	Report
18 Jul	15:00	RG	Mongolia	3–2	Kazakhstan	25–27	13–25	25–19	26–24	15–11	104–106	P2 Report
18 Jul	17:30	RG	Chinese Taipei	3–2	China	23–25	22–25	25–18	25–13	15–12	110–93	P2 Report

==== 11th place match ====
Date	Time	Venue		Score		Set 1	Set 2	Set 3	Set 4	Set 5	Total	Report
19 Jul	12:30	RG	Kazakhstan	2–3	China	26–24	25–22	17–25	17–25	10–15	95–111	P2 Report

==== 9th place match ====
Date	Time	Venue		Score		Set 1	Set 2	Set 3	Set 4	Set 5	Total	Report
19 Jul	15:00	RG	Mongolia	1–3	Chinese Taipei	19–25	14–25	26–24	15–25		74–99	P2 Report

=== 5th–8th places ===
5th–8th semifinals
18 July
Thailand	2
Indonesia	3
18 July
South Korea	2
Uzbekistan	3

5th place match
19 July
Indonesia	3
Uzbekistan	2
7th place match
19 July
Thailand	1
South Korea	3

==== 5th–8th semifinals ====
Date	Time	Venue		Score		Set 1	Set 2	Set 3	Set 4	Set 5	Total	Report
18 Jul	10:00	NPG	Thailand	2–3	Indonesia	20–25	25–16	24–26	25–16	10–15	104–98	P2 Report
18 Jul	12:30	NPG	South Korea	2–3	Uzbekistan	21–25	25–23	25–18	16–25	11–15	98–106	P2 Report

==== 7th place match ====
Date	Time	Venue		Score		Set 1	Set 2	Set 3	Set 4	Set 5	Total	Report
19 Jul	10:00	NPG	Thailand	1–3	South Korea	16–25	25–22	20–25	26–28		87–100	P2 Report

==== 5th place match ====
Date	Time	Venue		Score		Set 1	Set 2	Set 3	Set 4	Set 5	Total	Report
19 Jul	12:30	NPG	Indonesia	3–2	Uzbekistan	25–21	16–25	25–14	23–25	16–14	105–99	P2 Report

=== Final four ===
Semifinals
18 July
Japan	0
Iran	3
18 July
Pakistan	3
India	0

Final
19 July
Iran	2
Pakistan	3
3rd place match
2 July
Japan	2
India	3

==== Semifinals ====
Date	Time	Venue		Score		Set 1	Set 2	Set 3	Set 4	Set 5	Total	Report
18 Jul	15:00	NPG	Japan	0–3	Iran	20–25	22–25	19–25			61–75	P2 Report
18 Jul	17:30	NPG	Pakistan	3–0	India	25–16	25–19	25–12			75–47	P2 Report

==== 3rd place match ====
Date	Time	Venue		Score		Set 1	Set 2	Set 3	Set 4	Set 5	Total	Report
19 Jul	15:00	NPG	Japan	2–3	India	21–25	25–12	23–25	25–18	10–15	104–95	P2 Report

==== Final ====
Date	Time	Venue		Score		Set 1	Set 2	Set 3	Set 4	Set 5	Total	Report
19 Jul	17:30	NPG	Iran	2–3	Pakistan	25–22	25–21	28–30	21–25	10–15	109–113	P2 Report

== Final standing ==
Rank	Team
1st place, gold medalist(s)	Pakistan
2nd place, silver medalist(s)	Iran
3rd place, bronze medalist(s)	India
4	Japan
5	Indonesia
6	Uzbekistan
7	South Korea
8	Thailand
9	Chinese Taipei
10	Mongolia
11	China
12	Kazakhstan
13	Australia
14	Saudi Arabia
15	Hong Kong
DSQ	United Arab Emirates

Qualified for the 2026 Boys' U17 World Championship
Qualified for the 2026 Boys' U17 World Championship via FIVB World Ranking

2025 Asian Men's U16 champions

Pakistan
First title

12–boy roster
Muhammad Talha Mehar, Muhammad Irfan (c), Muhammad Waleed Khan, Faraz Ahmad, Faizan Ullah, Saran Baig, Muhammad Junaid, Asad Ullah, Azhar Mehmood, Hayat Sher Khan, Wahab Abdullah, Muhammad Umar
Head coach
Kafait Ullahh

== Awards ==
- Most valuable player
  Faizan Ullah (PAK)
- Best setter
  Aidin Pouzesh (IRI)
- Best outside spikers
  Faizan Ullah (PAK)
  Azhvan Namazi (IRI)
- Best opposite spiker
  Muhammad Junaid (PAK)
- Best middle blockers
  Maziar Fallahkharyeki (IRI)
  Wahab Abdullah (PAK)
- Best libero
  Shabad Gautam (IND)

== Qualified teams for FIVB U17 World Championship ==
The following teams from AVC qualified for the 2026 FIVB Volleyball Boys' U17 World Championship.

Team	Qualified on	Previous appearances in the FIVB Volleyball Boys' U17 World Championship
Pakistan	16 July 2025	0 (Debut)
Iran	16 July 2025	1 (2024)
India	16 July 2025	0 (Debut)
Japan	16 July 2025	0 (Debut)

== See also ==
- 2025 Asian Women's U16 Volleyball Championship
