= 2025 Boys' U16 African Nations Volleyball Championship =

2024 Boys' U18 African Nations Volleyball Championship
Tournament details
- Host country: Tunisia
- City: Tunis
- Dates: 24–29 August
- Venue: 1 (in 1 host city)

Final positions
- Champions: Egypt (2nd title)
- Runners-up: Tunisia
- Third place: Algeria
- Fourth place: Morocco

Tournament awards
- MVP: (Egypt) Abdelaziz Mohamed Ramy

Tournament statistics
- Matches played: 10

The 2025 Boys' U16 African Nations Volleyball Championship will be the 2nd edition of the Boys' U16 African Nations Volleyball Championship, the biennial international youth volleyball tournament organised by the African Volleyball Confederation (CAVB) for the boys' under-16 national teams of Africa. It was held in Tunis, Tunisia from 24 to 29 August 2025.

Four national teams took part in the tournament, with players born on or after 1 January 2010 being eligible to participate.

Same as previous edition, the tournament acted as the CAVB qualifiers for the FIVB Volleyball Boys' U17 World Championship. The top three teams qualified for the 2026 FIVB Volleyball Boys' U17 World Championship in Qatar as the CAVB representatives.

Egypt won their second title by beating Tunisia 3–0 in the final. Algeria completed the podium after defeating Morocco 3–2 in the third-place match. Champions Egypt, runners-up Tunisia and third-place Algeria qualified for the 2026 Boys' U17 World Championship.

== Host and venue ==
In early March 2025, it was announced that Libya had been chosen to host the African U16 Boys' and U20 Men's Volleyball Championships in 2025, which was confirmed by CAVB on 10 March 2025 with Tripoli as host city for the U16 event. Subsequently, the CAVB decided to relocate the U16 Boys' tournament confirming Tunis, the capital of Tunisia, as the new host city on 10 August 2025.

The competition took place at the Al Machatel Hall, a venue located in the Baldevebe Nursery west of Belvedere Park in Tunis. The Al Machatel Hall had recently been inaugurated in July 2024.

== Preliminary round ==
All match times are in local times, TNT (UTC+1), as listed by CAVB.

Pos	Team	Pld	W	L	Pts	SW	SL	SR	SPW	SPL	SPR	Qualification
1	Egypt	3	3	0	8	9	4	2.250	314	273	1.150	Semi-final 1
2	Algeria	3	2	1	6	8	6	1.333	297	308	0.964	Semi-final 2
3	Tunisia (H)	3	1	2	4	6	6	1.000	261	259	1.008	Semi-final 2
4	Morocco	3	0	3	0	2	9	0.222	241	273	0.883	Semi-final 1

Source: FIVB
Rules for classification: 1) Matches won; 2) Points; 3) Sets Ratio; 4) Setpoints ratio; 5) Head-to-head result.
(H) Host

Date	Time		Score		Set 1	Set 2	Set 3	Set 4	Set 5	Total	Report
24 Aug	13:00	Egypt	3–2	Algeria	25–14	22–25	25–21	27–29	15–8	114–97	Report
24 Aug	18:00	Tunisia	3–0	Morocco	25–18	25–23	25–16			75–57	Report
25 Aug	13:00	Morocco	1–3	Egypt	24–26	25–23	19–25	26–28		94–102	Report
25 Aug	18:00	Algeria	3–2	Tunisia	28–26	25–17	20–25	16–25	15–11	104–104	Report
26 Aug	13:00	Morocco	1–3	Algeria	25–27	19–25	25–19	21–25		90–96	Report
26 Aug	18:00	Tunisia	1–3	Egypt	15–25	25–23	19–25	23–25		82–98	Report

== Final round ==
Semi-finals
28 August
Egypt	3
Morocco	0
28 August
Algeria	2
Tunisia	3

Final
29 August
Egypt	3
Tunisia	0
Third-place match
29 August
Morocco	2
Algeria	3

=== Semi-finals ===
Date	Time		Score		Set 1	Set 2	Set 3	Set 4	Set 5	Total	Report
28 Aug	13:00	Egypt	3–0	Morocco	25–17	25–20	25–18			75–55	Report
28 Aug	18:00	Algeria	2–3	Tunisia	25–14	25–20	21–25	21–25	11–15	103–99	Report

=== 3rd place match ===
Date	Time		Score		Set 1	Set 2	Set 3	Set 4	Set 5	Total	Report
29 Aug	13:00	Morocco	2–3	Algeria	13–25	25–22	18–25	25–22	10–15	91–109	Report

=== Final ===
Date	Time		Score		Set 1	Set 2	Set 3	Set 4	Set 5	Total	Report
29 Aug	18:00	Egypt	3–0	Tunisia	25–17	25–20	25–19			75–56	Report

== Final standing ==
Rank	Team
1st place, gold medalist(s)	Egypt
2nd place, silver medalist(s)	Tunisia
3rd place, bronze medalist(s)	Algeria
4	Morocco

Qualified for 2026 FIVB Boys' U17 World Championship.

2025 Men's U17 African champions

Egypt
First title

Team Roster:

2 Omar Reda, 3 Hassan Khaled, 5 Ali Ahmed, 6 Hamad Ziad (L), 7 Hussein Selim Mohamed, 9 Mohamed Ramy, 10 Mohamed Youssef, 11 Omar Wael, 13 Mostafa Omar (c), 15 Seif El-Din Ahmed, 17 Yassin Taj El-Din Aly, 19 Youssef Sameh.

Head coach: (Egypt) Mohamed Ellakany

== Individual awards ==
The following individual awards were presented at the end of the tournament.

- Most valuable player (MVP)

Abdelaziz Mohamed (EGY)

- Best middle blockers

Mostafa Omar (EGY)
Allal Mohamed Iyad (ALG)

- Best setter

Yassin Taj El-Din (EGY)

- Best opposite spiker

Hussein SelIm (EGY)

- Best outside spikers

Abdelaziz Mohamed (EGY)
Jenhani Mahdi (TUN)

- Best libero

Hamad Ziad (EGY)
