= United States men's national under-17 volleyball team =

United States U17
- Association: USA Volleyball
- Confederation: NORCECA
- FIVB ranking: NR (15 October 2026)

Uniforms
Home	Away	Third

Boys U17 NORCECA Continental Championship
- Appearances: 1 (First in 2025)
- Best result: (bronze) Bronze : (2025)
- www.usavolleyball.org
Honours
Boys U17 NORCECA Continental Championship
Bronze medal – third place	2025 Nicaragua	Team
Boys U17 NORCECA Pan American Cup
Bronze medal – third place	2026 Guatemala	Team

The United States men's national under-17 volleyball team represents the United States in international men's volleyball competitions and friendly matches for players under the age 17. It is ruled by the American Volleyball Federation USAV body. It is an affiliate of the International Volleyball Federation FIVB and also a part of the North, Central America and Caribbean Volleyball Confederation NORCECA. The team participated in its first international competition in 2025.

== Results ==
=== FIVB Boys' U17 World Championship ===
Champions Runners up Third place Fourth place

FIVB Boys' U17 World Championship
Year	Round	Position	Pld	W	L	SW	SL	Squad
(Bulgaria) 2024	Didn't participate							
(Qatar) 2026	Qualified but withdraw							
Total	0 Title	0/2						—N/a

=== Boys U17 NORCECA Continental Championship ===
Champions Runners up Third place Fourth place

Boys U17 NORCECA Continental Championship
Year	Round	Position	Pld	W	L	SW	SL	Squad
(Mexico) 2023	Didn't participate							
(Nicaragua) 2025	Semi-Final	Bronze	5	4	1	13	6	Squad
Total	0 Title	1/2	5	4	1	13	6	—N/a

=== Boys U17 NORCECA Pan American Cup ===
Champions Runners up Third place Fourth place

Boys U17 NORCECA Pan American Cup
Year	Round	Position	Pld	W	L	SW	SL	Squad
(Mexico) 2024	Didn't participate							
(Guatemala) 2026	Semi-Final	Third place	6	4	2	13	8	Squad
Total	0 Title	1/2	6	4	2	13	8	—N/a
