= 2023 Boys' U17 South American Volleyball Championship =

Tournament details
- Host country: Brazil
- City: Araguari
- Dates: 23–27 August
- Teams: 5
- Venue: 1 (in 1 host city)

Final positions
- Champions: Brazil (1st title)
- Runners-up: Argentina
- Third place: Chile
- Fourth place: Peru

Tournament awards
- MVP: (Brazil) Lucas Righi
- Best Setter: (Brazil) Caio Horácio
- Best OH: (Brazil) Miguel Senes (Argentina) Federico Debonis
- Best MB: (Brazil) Théo Schrank (Argentina) Álvaro Ferrer
- Best OPP: (Argentina) Henry Sinner
- Best Libero: (Brazil) Bruno Romano

Tournament statistics
- Matches played: 10

The 2023 Boys' U17 South American Volleyball Championship was the 1st edition of the Boys' U17 South American Volleyball Championship, a biennial international girls' volleyball tournament organised by the Confederación Sudamericana de Voleibol (CSV) for the boys' under-17 national teams of South America. It was held in Araguari, Brazil from 23 to 27 August 2023.

Five national teams took part in the tournament. Players born between 1 January 2008 and 31 December 2009 were eligible to participate.

The tournament acted as the CSV qualifiers for the FIVB Volleyball Boys' U17 World Championship. The top three teams qualified for the 2024 FIVB Volleyball Boys' U17 World Championship in Bulgaria as the CSV representatives.

Undefeated and without losing a set, Brazil won the title after finishing first in the single group of the competition. Argentina were the runners-up while Chile completed the podium in third place. These three teams qualified for the 2024 FIVB Volleyball Boys' U17 World Championship.

== Host nation and venue ==
The tournament took place in Araguari, state of Minas Gerais, Brazil. Matches were entirely played at the Ginásio Poliesportivo General Mário Brum Negreiros owned by Prefeitura de Araguari.

Araguari	Location of the host city in the Federative Unit of Minas Gerais
Ginásio Poliesportivo General Mário Brum Negreiros	Location of the host city in the Federative Unit of Minas Gerais
Capacity: 2,200	Location of the host city in the Federative Unit of Minas Gerais

== Competition format ==
The competition format depends on the number of participating teams. With 5 teams, a single group of five were formed which was played on a single round-robin basis. No finals or placement matches are played. The group standing procedure was as follows:

1. Number of matches won;
2. Match points;
  - Match won 3–0: 3 match points for the winner, 0 match points for the loser
  - Match won 3–1: 3 match points for the winner, 0 match point for the loser
  - Match won 3–2: 2 match points for the winner, 1 match points for the loser
3. Sets ratio;
4. Points ratio;
5. If the tie continues between two teams: result of the last match between the tied teams;
6. If the tie continues between two teams: result of the last match between the tied teams. If the tie continues between three or more teams: a new classification would be made taking into consideration only the matches involving the teams in question.

== Standings ==
Pos	Team	Pld	W	L	Pts	SW	SL	SR	SPW	SPL	SPR	Qualification
1	Brazil (H, C)	4	4	0	12	12	0	MAX	302	193	1.565	2024 FIVB Volleyball Boys' U17 World Championship
2	Argentina	4	3	1	9	9	3	3.000	292	223	1.309	2024 FIVB Volleyball Boys' U17 World Championship
3	Chile	4	2	2	6	6	7	0.857	268	292	0.918	2024 FIVB Volleyball Boys' U17 World Championship
4	Peru	4	1	3	2	4	11	0.364	260	348	0.747	
5	Colombia	4	0	4	1	2	12	0.167	258	324	0.796	

Rules for classification: Tiebreakers
(C) Champion; (H) Host

== Results ==
All match times are local times, BRT (UTC-3).

Date	Time		Score		Set 1	Set 2	Set 3	Set 4	Set 5	Total	Report
23 Aug	15:00	Brazil	3–0	Peru	25–9	25–12	25–11			75–32	Report
23 Aug	17:00	Chile	3–0	Colombia	25–21	26–24	25–22			76–67	Report
24 Aug	17:00	Argentina	3–0	Colombia	25–15	25–16	25–12			75–43	Report
24 Aug	19:00	Brazil	3–0	Chile	25–19	25–15	25–13			75–47	Report
25 Aug	17:00	Colombia	2–3	Peru	25–21	21–25	25–12	18–25	12–15	101–98	Report
25 Aug	19:00	Argentina	3–0	Chile	25–18	25–16	25–14			75–48	Report
26 Aug	14:00	Brazil	3–0	Colombia	25–10	25–15	25–22			75–47	Report
26 Aug	16:00	Argentina	3–0	Peru	25–18	25–20	25–17			75–55	Report
27 Aug	14:00	Peru	1–3	Chile	25–22	15–25	16–25	19–25		75–97	Report
27 Aug	16:00	Brazil	3–0	Argentina	25–20	25–22	27–25			77–67	Report

== Final standing ==
Rank	Team
1st place, gold medalist(s)	Brazil
2nd place, silver medalist(s)	Argentina
3rd place, bronze medalist(s)	Chile
4	Peru
5	Colombia

Qualified for 2024 FIVB Boys' U17 World Championship

2023 Boys' U17 South American champions

Brazil
First title

Team Roster:

1 Nicolas Rodrigues, 2 Théo Schrank, 3 Eliab Correa, 4 João Pedro Limeira, 5 Kayo Rafael Costa (L), 6 Miguel Senes, 7 Lucas Righi, 8 Lucas Vinícius, 9 Emanuel Bertoncini, 10 Cauã Casagrande, 11 Bruno Romano (c, L), 15 Gilson Freitas, 16 Victor Porto, 18 Caio Horácio.

Head coach: (Brazil) Marcelo Zenni

== Individual awards ==
The following individual awards were presented at the end of the tournament.

- Most valuable player (MVP)

Lucas Righi (BRA)

- Best middle blockers

Théo Schrank (BRA)
Álvaro Ferrer (ARG)

- Best setter

Caio Horácio (BRA)

- Best opposite spiker

Henry Sinner (ARG)

- Best outside spikers

Miguel Senes (BRA)
Federico Debonis (ARG)

- Best libero

Bruno Romano (BRA)
