= 2023 Boys' U17 NORCECA Volleyball Championship =

Tournament details
- Host country: Mexico
- City: Poza Rica
- Dates: 7–12 November 2023
- Teams: 9
- Venue: 1 (in 1 host city)

Final positions
- Champions: Puerto Rico (1st title)
- Runners-up: Mexico
- Third place: Cuba
- Fourth place: Costa Rica

Tournament awards
- MVP: (Puerto Rico) Maximiliano Aponte
- Best Setter: (Cuba) Yothuel Vergara
- Best OH: (Mexico) Emi Díaz (Puerto Rico) Maximiliano Aponte
- Best MB: (Puerto Rico) Fernando Castello (Mexico) Raúl Silva
- Best OPP: (Puerto Rico) Erick Vázquez
- Best Libero: (Puerto Rico) Ignacio Cruz

Tournament statistics
- Matches played: 22
- Best scorer: (Mexico) Emi Díaz (111 points)
- Best spiker: (Costa Rica) Julian Soto (64.95%)
- Best blocker: (Puerto Rico) Fernando Castello (0.84 Ave.)
- Best server: (Mexico) Emi Díaz (0.95 Ave.)
- Best setter: (Cuba) Yothuel Vergara (1.72 Ave.)
- Best digger: (Puerto Rico) Ignacio Cruz (6.21 Ave.)
- Best receiver: (Puerto Rico) Adrián Carrillo (51.02%)

The 2023 Boys' U17 NORCECA Volleyball Championship, officially named 2023 NORCECA Boys' U17 Continental Championship, was the 1st edition of the Boys' U17 NORCECA Volleyball Championship, a biennial international volleyball tournament organised by the North, Central America and Caribbean Volleyball Confederation (NORCECA) for the boys' under-17 national teams of North, Central America and Caribbean. It was held in Poza Rica, Mexico from 7 to 12 November 2023.

The tournament acted as the NORCECA qualifiers for the FIVB Volleyball Boys' U17 World Championship. The top three teams qualified for the 2024 FIVB Volleyball Boys' U17 World Championship in Bulgaria as the NORCECA representatives.

Puerto Rico won the title after beating Mexico 3–1 in the final. Cuba defeated Costa Rica 3–0 in the third place match to take the bronce medal. Champions Puerto Rico, runners-up Mexico and the third place Cuba qualified for the 2024 FIVB Volleyball Girls' U17 World Championship.

== Participating teams ==
A maximum of 8 national teams could qualify for the tournament as follows: the host nation and the top 7 teams according to the NORCECA U19 Continental Ranking as of 1 January 2023 (as reference, considering that there was no U17 ranking) that confirmed their participation. Eventually, 9 teams were admitted to participate in the tournament.

The following were the teams invited and eligible to participate in the tournament (teams that confirmed their participation marked in bold and U19 Continental Ranking is shown in brackets):

- ~~United States~~ (1)
- **Puerto Rico** (2)
- **Cuba** (3)
- **Guatemala** (4)
- **Costa Rica** (5)
- **Mexico** (6, hosts)
- **Nicaragua** (7)
- **Dominican Republic** (8)
- **Honduras** (9)
- **Suriname** (10)
- ~~Trinidad and Tobago~~ (11)
- ~~Belize~~ (12)
- ~~El Salvador~~ (13)
- ~~Barbados~~ (14)
- ~~Jamaica~~ (15)
- ~~U.S. Virgin Islands~~ (16)
- ~~Canada~~ (no rank)

=== Squads ===
Each national team had to register a squad of 12 players. Players born on 1 January 2008 and onwards were eligible to compete in the tournament.

== Venue ==
The tournament was entirely played at the Gimnasio Miguel Hidalgo, an indoor arena located in Poza Rica, state of Veracruz. The Gimnasio Miguel Hidalgo has a capacity of 2,500 seats.

== Competition format ==
In the NORCECA Volleyball Championships the competition format depends on the number of participating teams. With 9 teams two pools were formed. one of five teams and the other of four. The pool standing procedure were as follows:

1. Number of matches won;
2. Match points;
  - Match won 3–0: 5 match points for the winner, 0 match points for the loser
  - Match won 3–1: 4 match points for the winner, 1 match point for the loser
  - Match won 3–2: 3 match points for the winner, 2 match points for the loser
3. Points ratio;
4. Sets ratio;
5. If the tie continues between two teams: result of the last match between the tied teams;
6. If the tie continues between three or more teams: a new classification would be made taking into consideration only the matches between involved teams.

The winners of each pool advanced directly to the semi-finals, while the runners-up and the third placed teams advanced to the quarter-finals.

=== Groups composition ===
Teams were distributed into two groups, one of five teams and other of four. As hosts, Mexico had the right to choose the group in which to be placed and were assigned to the head of its group (Group A). The remaining teams were distributed into the groups using the serpentine system in accordance with their position in the NORCECA U19 Continental Ranking as of 1 January 2023 (as reference, considering that there was no U17 ranking), starting with the highest-ranked team as head of the remaining group (Group B)

Group A	Group B
Mexico	Puerto Rico
Guatemala	Cuba
Costa Rica	Nicaragua
Honduras	Dominican Republic
Suriname	—N/a

== Preliminary round ==
All match times are local times, CST (UTC−6), as listed by NORCECA.

=== Group A ===
Pos	Team	Pld	W	L	Pts	SW	SL	SR	SPW	SPL	SPR	Qualification
1	Mexico	4	4	0	20	12	0	MAX	300	172	1.744	Semi-finals
2	Costa Rica	4	3	1	13	9	5	1.800	312	218	1.431	Semi-finals
3	Guatemala	4	2	2	12	8	6	1.333	292	283	1.032	5th place match
4	Suriname	4	1	3	3	3	11	0.273	211	328	0.643	7th place match
5	Honduras	4	0	4	2	2	12	0.167	221	335	0.660	8th place match

Source: NORCECA

Date	Time		Score		Set 1	Set 2	Set 3	Set 4	Set 5	Total	Report
7 Nov	18:00	Guatemala	3–0	Honduras	26–20	25–18	25–12			76–50	P2 P3
7 Nov	20:00	Mexico	3–0	Suriname	25–10	25–8	25–9			75–27	P2 P3
8 Nov	18:00	Costa Rica	3–2	Guatemala	23–25	25–7	23–25	25–19	15–8	111–84	P2 P3
8 Nov	20:00	Honduras	0–3	Mexico	14–25	8–25	14–25			36–75	P2 P3
9 Nov	18:00	Suriname	3–2	Honduras	25–22	25–22	22–25	23–25	15–9	110–103	P2 P3
9 Nov	20:00	Mexico	3–0	Costa Rica	25–18	25–18	25–15			75–51	P2 P3
10 Nov	10:00	Costa Rica	3–0	Honduras	25–13	25–9	25–10			75–32	P2 P3
10 Nov	12:00	Suriname	0–3	Guatemala	16–25	19–25	12–25			47–75	P2 P3
10 Nov	19:00	Suriname	0–3	Costa Rica	7–25	10–25	10–25			27–75	P2 P3
10 Nov	21:00	Guatemala	0–3	Mexico	16–25	21–25	21–25			58–75	P2 P3

=== Group B ===
Pos	Team	Pld	W	L	Pts	SW	SL	SR	SPW	SPL	SPR	Qualification
1	Puerto Rico	3	3	0	12	9	3	3.000	282	220	1.282	Semi-finals
2	Cuba	3	2	1	12	8	3	2.667	257	200	1.285	Semi-finals
3	Dominican Republic	3	1	2	5	4	7	0.571	221	265	0.834	5th place match
4	Nicaragua	3	0	3	1	1	9	0.111	170	245	0.694	7th place match

Source: NORCECA

Date	Time		Score		Set 1	Set 2	Set 3	Set 4	Set 5	Total	Report
7 Nov	14:00	Puerto Rico	3–1	Dominican Republic	21–25	25–21	25–12	25–16		96–74	P2 P3
7 Nov	16:00	Cuba	3–0	Nicaragua	25–6	25–18	25–13			75–37	P2 P3
8 Nov	14:00	Nicaragua	0–3	Puerto Rico	11–25	15–25	13–25			39–75	P2 P3
8 Nov	16:00	Dominican Republic	0–3	Cuba	15–25	20–25	17–25			52–75	P2 P3
9 Nov	14:00	Dominican Republic	3–1	Nicaragua	29–27	16–25	25–21	25–21		95–94	P2 P3
9 Nov	16:00	Puerto Rico	3–2	Cuba	20–25	26–24	25–17	22–25	18–16	111–107	P2 P3

== Final round ==
=== Bracket ===
Semi-finals
1B	Puerto Rico	3
2A	Costa Rica	0
1A	Mexico	3
2B	Cuba	1

Final
Puerto Rico	3
Mexico	1
3rd place match
Costa Rica	0
Cuba	3

8th place match
5A	Honduras	3
4A	Suriname	1

7th place match
4A	Suriname	0
4B	Nicaragua	3

5th place match
3A	Guatemala	3
3B	Dominican Republic	2

=== Semi-finals ===
Date	Time		Score		Set 1	Set 2	Set 3	Set 4	Set 5	Total	Report
11 Nov	18:00	Puerto Rico	3–0	Costa Rica	25–21	25–19	25–19			75–59	P2 P3
11 Nov	20:00	Mexico	3–1	Cuba	22–25	28–26	27–25	25–20		102–96	P2 P3

=== 8th place match ===
Date	Time		Score		Set 1	Set 2	Set 3	Set 4	Set 5	Total	Report
12 Nov	10:00	Honduras	3–1	Suriname	25–20	20–25	25–23	25–22		95–90	P2 P3

=== 7th place match ===
Date	Time		Score		Set 1	Set 2	Set 3	Set 4	Set 5	Total	Report
11 Nov	14:00	Suriname	0–3	Nicaragua	12–25	16–25	12–25			40–75	P2 P3

=== 5th place match ===
Date	Time		Score		Set 1	Set 2	Set 3	Set 4	Set 5	Total	Report
11 Nov	16:00	Guatemala	3–2	Dominican Republic	23–25	14–25	27–25	25–21	15–9	104–105	P2 P3

=== 3rd place match ===
Date	Time		Score		Set 1	Set 2	Set 3	Set 4	Set 5	Total	Report
12 Nov	12:00	Costa Rica	0–3	Cuba	11–25	12–25	22–25			45–75	P2 P3

=== Final ===
Date	Time		Score		Set 1	Set 2	Set 3	Set 4	Set 5	Total	Report
12 Nov	14:00	Puerto Rico	3–1	Mexico	25–23	24–26	25–16	25–20		99–85	P2 P3

== Final standing ==
Qualified for 2024 FIVB Volleyball Boys' U17 World Championship.

Rank	Team
1st place, gold medalist(s)	Puerto Rico
2nd place, silver medalist(s)	Mexico
3rd place, bronze medalist(s)	Cuba
4	Costa Rica
5	Guatemala
6	Dominican Republic
7	Nicaragua
8	Honduras
9	Suriname

2023 Boys' U17 NORCECA Championship champions

Puerto Rico
First title

Team Roster:

Erick Vázquez, Rocco Figueroa, Adrián Carrillo, Ignacio Cruz (L), Maximiliano Aponte, José Andrés Soriano, Leo Vázquez, Gustavo Álvarez (c), Daoiz Maza, Fernando Castello, Jorge Suárez, Dylan López

Head coach: (Puerto Rico) Carlos De Sevilla Rios

== Individual awards ==
The following individual awards were presented at the end of the tournament.

- Most valuable player
  Maximiliano Aponte (PUR)
- Best setter
  Yothuel Vergara (CUB)
- Best outside spikers
  Emi Díaz (MEX)
  Maximiliano Aponte (PUR)
- Best middle blockers
  Fernando Castello (PUR)
  Raúl Silva (MEX)
- Best opposite
  Erick Vázquez (PUR)
- Best scorer
  Emi Díaz (MEX)
- Best server
  Emi Díaz (MEX)
- Best libero
  Ignacio Cruz (PUR)
- Best digger
  Ignacio Cruz (PUR)
- Best receiver
  Adrián Carrillo (PUR)
