= AVC Boys' U16 Volleyball Championship =

International volleyball competition in Asia and Oceania

- Most recent season or competition: 2025 Asian Men's U16 Volleyball Championship
- Sport: Volleyball
- Founded: 2023; 3 years ago
- First season: 2023
- No. of teams: 16
- Continents: Asia and Oceania (AVC)
- Most recent champions: Pakistan (1st title)
- Most titles: Iran; Pakistan (1 title each)

The AVC Boys' U16 Volleyball Championship, is an international volleyball competition in Asia and Oceania contested by the under 16 men's national teams of the members of Asian Volleyball Confederation (AVC), the sport's continent governing body. Tournaments have been awarded every two years since 2023. The top four teams qualified for the FIVB Volleyball Boys' U17 World Championship.

== Result summary ==
Year	Host	Final			3rd place match			Teams
Year	Host	Champions	Score	Runners-up	3rd place	Score	4th place	Teams
2023; Details	(Uzbekistan); Tashkent	Iran	3–1	Uzbekistan	Chinese Taipei	3–1	Pakistan	12
2025; Details	(Thailand); Nakhon Pathom	Pakistan	3–2	Iran	India	3–2	Japan	16
2027; Details	(China); TBA							

=== Teams reaching the top four ===
Team	Winners	Runners-up	Third-place	Fourth-place
Iran	1 (2023)	1 (2025)		
Pakistan	1 (2025)			1 (2023)
Uzbekistan		1 (2023)		
India			1 (2025)	
Chinese Taipei			1 (2023)	
Japan				1 (2025)

=== Champions by region ===
Federation (Region)	Champion(s)	Number
CAVA (Central Asia)	Iran (1); Pakistan (1)	2 title

== Hosts ==
Number	Nations	Year(s)
1	Uzbekistan	2023
1	Thailand	2025
1	China	2027

== Medal table ==
Rank	Nation	Gold	Silver	Bronze	Total
1	Iran	1	1	0	2
2	Pakistan	1	0	0	1
3	Uzbekistan	0	1	0	1
4	Chinese Taipei	0	0	1	1
4	India	0	0	1	1
Totals (5 entries)		2	2	2	6

== Participating nations ==
Legend

- 1st – Champions
- 2nd – Runners-up
- 3rd – Third place
- 4th – Fourth place
- • – Did not enter / Did not qualify
- – Hosts
- Q – Qualified for the forthcoming tournament

Year Team	(Uzbekistan) 2023 (12)	(Thailand) 2025 (16)	Total
Australia	8th	13th	2
China	9th	11th	2
Chinese Taipei	3rd	9th	2
Hong Kong	11th	15th	2
India	•	3rd	1
Indonesia	•	5th	1
Iran	1st	2nd	2
Japan	5th	4th	2
Kazakhstan	6th	12th	2
Mongolia	10th	10th	2
Pakistan	4th	1st	2
Saudi Arabia	12th	14th	2
South Korea	•	7th	1
Thailand	7th	8th	2
United Arab Emirates	•	DSQ	1
Uzbekistan	2nd	6th	2

=== Debut of teams ===
Year	Debutants	Total
2023	Australia	12
2023	China	12
2023	Hong Kong	12
2023	Iran	12
2023	Japan	12
2023	Kazakhstan	12
2023	Saudi Arabia	12
2023	Mongolia	12
2023	Pakistan	12
2023	Thailand	12
2023	Chinese Taipei	12
2023	Uzbekistan	12
2025	India	4
2025	Indonesia	4
2025	South Korea	4
2025	United Arab Emirates	4

== Awards ==
=== Most Valuable Player ===
Tournament	Most Valuable Player
2023	(Iran) Khoshhaldashliboroun Mohammadraouf
2025	(Pakistan) Faizan Ullah

=== Best Outside Spikers ===
Tournament	Best Opposite Spiker
2023	(Uzbekistan) Haydarov Ogabek
2023	(Iran) Khoshhaldashliboroun Mohammadraouf
2025	(Pakistan) Faizan Ullah
2025	(Iran) Azhvan Namazi

=== Best Opposite Spiker ===
Tournament	Best Opposite Spiker
2023	(Chinese Taipei) Huang Pin-Yen
2025	(Pakistan) Muhammad Junaid

=== Best Setter ===
Tournament	Best Setter
2023	(Uzbekistan) Halimov Shohruhxon
2025	(Iran) Aidin Pouzesh

=== Best Middle Blockers ===
Tournament	Best Middle Blockers
2023	(Iran) Mohseni Bababdani Taha
2023	(Chinese Taipei) Liou Guan-Peng
2025	(Iran) Maziar Fallahkharyeki
2025	(Pakistan) Wahab Abdullah

=== Best Libero ===
Tournament	Best Libero
2023	(Iran) Eimery Masoud
2025	(India) Shabad Gautam

== See also ==
- AVC Girls' U16 Volleyball Championship
- AVC Men's Volleyball Continental Championship
- AVC Men's Volleyball Cup
- AVC Men's U20 Volleyball Championship
- AVC Girls' U18 Volleyball Championship
