= 2026 FIVB Volleyball Boys' U17 World Championship =

Tournament details
- Host country: Qatar
- City: Doha
- Dates: 19–29 August 2026
- Teams: 20 (from 5 confederations)
- Venues: 2 (in 1 host city)

Final positions
- Champions: Iran (1st title)
- Runners-up: France
- Third place: Brazil
- Fourth place: Argentina

Tournament awards
- MVP: (Iran) Sina Hazrati
- Best Setter: (Iran) Akam Ebrahimnezhad
- Best OH: (France) Jaden Ébagne Yon; (Argentina) Valentín Bianchi
- Best MB: (Iran) Monib Sheikh; (Brazil) Lucas de Abreu
- Best OPP: (Iran) Sina Hazrati
- Best Libero: (France) Corentin Agnèse

Tournament statistics
- Matches played: 46
- Attendance: 9,974 (217 per match)

The 2026 FIVB Volleyball Boys' U17 World Championship was the second edition of the FIVB Volleyball Boys' U17 World Championship, the biennial international youth volleyball championship contested by the men's national teams under the age of 17 of the members associations of the Fédération Internationale de Volleyball (FIVB), the sport's global governing body. It took place in Doha, Qatar from 19 to 29 August 2026. Originally scheduled to be contested by 24 teams, it was ultimately reduced to 20 teams following withdrawals.

Italy were the defending champions having won the inaugural edition in 2024, but lost to Argentina 3–1 in the round of 16. Iran won their first title, after defeated France 3–1 in the final.

== Host selection ==
On 17 April 2025, FIVB opened the bidding process for member associations interested in hosting one of the two U17 World Championships in 2026 (i.e., Girls' or Boys' U17 World Championships) planned to take place in August 2026. The expression of interest of the member associations had to be submitted to FIVB no later than 18:00 CEST (UTC+2) on 30 May 2025.

FIVB announced the hosts for both Boys' and Girls' U17 World Championships on 1 July 2025, choosing Qatar to host the second edition of the Boys' U17 World Championship, with the capital Doha as host city. It will be the first time that Qatar hosts an FIVB World Championship in any age or gender category. Qatar recently hosted the last edition of the defunct FIVB Men's Volleyball Challenger Cup in 2023.

== Competition format changes ==
On 10 April 2025, during a two-day meeting in Lausanne, Switzerland the FIVB Board of Administration approved the proposal made by its Volleyball Council to increase the number of participating teams in its U17 World Championship (in both genders) from 16 to 24, as well as to standardize its competition format and qualification process with those of the U19 and U21 World Championships. Consequently, the distribution of quotas by confederation for the Boys' U17 World Championship was modified regarding the inaugural edition, ensuring one automatic quota for the defending champion and assigning two quotas based on the corresponding FIVB Age Group World Ranking.

With the expansion to 24 teams, the new competition format consisted of four single round-robin pools of six, with the top four teams from each pool advancing to the round of 16 while the remaining two teams continuing their participation in the playoffs for places from 17th to 24th. The round of 16 winners advances to the quarter-finals, while the losers continue their participation in the playoffs for places from 9th to 16th. Finally, the 24 teams go through another three rounds: quarter-finals, semi-finals and finals for each team's final placement level (17th–24th, 9th–16th and 1st–8th).

In February 2026 the FIVB Board of Administration approved a new competition format for the tournament, expanding the groups from four to six, with four teams in each. The top two teams from each group, along with the four best third-place teams, would advance to the round of 16 and then proceed to the quarter-finals, semi-finals, third-place match, and final to determine the champion. The final standings for all eliminated teams in each round would be determined by a combined team ranking system rather than the placement play-offs initially planned. This new format would be implemented across all age-group FIVB events from 2027.

However, following the withdrawal of four teams from the tournament, the competition format was adjusted following a decision by the FIVB Board of Administration on 14 August 2026. Under the updated format, the 20 teams were split into five single round-robin pools of four. The top 16 teams—the five pool winners, five runners-up, five third-placed teams, and the best four-placed team—advanced to the round of 16, where they were seeded 1st through 16th in a single-elimination bracket using a combined ranking system based on pool results while the remaining four teams were eliminated. The tournament then proceeds through the quarter-finals and semi-finals, concluding with the gold and bronze medal matches.

== Teams ==
=== Qualification ===
A total of 24 national teams qualified for the final tournament. In addition to the host Qatar and defending champions Italy which qualified automatically, 20 other teams qualified through five separate continental competitions which have to be completed before 31 December 2025. Two remaining teams entered the tournament via the Boys' U17 FIVB World Ranking (as of 31 December 2025) among the teams not yet qualified.

The slot allocation was set as follows:

- Defending champion (Italy): 1
- Host (Qatar): 1
- AVC (Asia & Oceania): 4
- CAVB (Africa): 3
- CEV (Europe): 6
- CSV (South America): 3
- NORCECA (North, Central America and Caribbean): 4
- Top teams not yet qualified as per Boys' U17 FIVB World Ranking: 2

=== Qualified teams ===
The following twenty-four teams qualified for the tournament.

Confederation	Qualifying tournament / Method of qualification	Team qualified	Previous appearances			Previous best performance
Confederation	Qualifying tournament / Method of qualification	Team qualified	Total	First	Last	Previous best performance
AVC (Asia & Oceania)	Host nation	Qatar	0	None		Debut
AVC (Asia & Oceania)	2025 Asian Men's U16 Championship ( (Thailand) Nakhon Pathom, 12–19 July)	Iran	1	2024		5th place (2024)
AVC (Asia & Oceania)	2025 Asian Men's U16 Championship ( (Thailand) Nakhon Pathom, 12–19 July)	Pakistan	0	None		Debut
AVC (Asia & Oceania)	2025 Asian Men's U16 Championship ( (Thailand) Nakhon Pathom, 12–19 July)	~~Japan~~	~~0~~	~~None~~		~~Debut~~
AVC (Asia & Oceania)	2025 Asian Men's U16 Championship ( (Thailand) Nakhon Pathom, 12–19 July)	India	0	None		Debut
AVC (Asia & Oceania)	Boys' U17 FIVB World Ranking	Chinese Taipei	1	2024		3rd place (2024)
CAVB (Africa)	2025 Boys' U16 African Nations Championship ( (Tunisia) Tunis, 24–29 August)	Egypt	1	2024		7th place (2024)
CAVB (Africa)	2025 Boys' U16 African Nations Championship ( (Tunisia) Tunis, 24–29 August)	Tunisia	1	2024		13th place (2024)
CAVB (Africa)	2025 Boys' U16 African Nations Championship ( (Tunisia) Tunis, 24–29 August)	Algeria	0	None		Debut
CEV (Europe)	Defending champions	Italy	1	2024		Champions (2024)
CEV (Europe)	2025 Men's U16 European Championship ( (Armenia) Yerevan, 23 July–3 August)	Spain	1	2024		4th place (2024)
CEV (Europe)	2025 Men's U16 European Championship ( (Armenia) Yerevan, 23 July–3 August)	France	0	None		Debut
CEV (Europe)	2025 Men's U16 European Championship ( (Armenia) Yerevan, 23 July–3 August)	Poland	0	None		Debut
CEV (Europe)	2025 Men's U16 European Championship ( (Armenia) Yerevan, 23 July–3 August)	~~Czech Republic~~	~~0~~	None		~~Debut~~
CEV (Europe)	2025 Men's U16 European Championship ( (Armenia) Yerevan, 23 July–3 August)	Romania	0	None		Debut
CEV (Europe)	2025 Men's U16 European Championship ( (Armenia) Yerevan, 23 July–3 August)	Turkey	0	None		Debut
CEV (Europe)	Boys' U17 FIVB World Ranking	Bulgaria	1	2024		9th place (2024)
CSV (South America)	2025 Boys' U17 South American Championship ( (Argentina) Comodoro Rivadavia, 14–18 January 2026)	Brazil	1	2024		8th place (2024)
CSV (South America)	2025 Boys' U17 South American Championship ( (Argentina) Comodoro Rivadavia, 14–18 January 2026)	Argentina	1	2024		Runners-up (2024)
CSV (South America)	2025 Boys' U17 South American Championship ( (Argentina) Comodoro Rivadavia, 14–18 January 2026)	Venezuela	0	None		Debut
NORCECA (North, Central America and Caribbean)	2025 Boys' U17 NORCECA Continental Championship ( (Nicaragua) Managua, 19–24 November)	~~Puerto Rico~~	~~1~~	2024		~~15th place (2024)~~
NORCECA (North, Central America and Caribbean)	2025 Boys' U17 NORCECA Continental Championship ( (Nicaragua) Managua, 19–24 November)	Cuba	1	2024		10th place (2024)
NORCECA (North, Central America and Caribbean)	2025 Boys' U17 NORCECA Continental Championship ( (Nicaragua) Managua, 19–24 November)	~~United States~~	~~0~~	None		~~Debut~~
NORCECA (North, Central America and Caribbean)	2025 Boys' U17 NORCECA Continental Championship ( (Nicaragua) Managua, 19–24 November)	Mexico	1	2024		12th place (2024)

== Pools composition ==
External videos
- Drawing Of Lots - 2026 FIVB Volleyball Boys' U17 World Championship
- FIVB Volleyball Boys' U17 World Championship - Redrawing Of Lots

On 18 March 2026, the original drawing of lots was live-streamed on FIVB YouTube channel with 24 teams divided into six pools of four. On 14 August, four teams—Czech Republic, Japan, Puerto Rico and the United States—withdrew from the tournament, citing safety concerns amidst the ongoing situation in the Middle East. Subsequently, the redrawing of the pools was also live-streamed, resulting in 20 teams divided into five pools of four.

=== Seeding ===
Boys' U17 FIVB World Ranking of each team as of 22 January 2026 are shown in brackets, except the hosts Qatar who are unranked.

Seeded teams		Unseeded teams to be drawn	
Line 1	Line 2	Pot 1 (line 3)	Pot 2 (line 4)
Qatar (Hosts, assigned to A1); Italy (1), assigned to B1; Argentina (2), assigned to C1; Spain (3), assigned to D1; Iran (4), assigned to E1	Chinese Taipei (5), assigned to E2; Egypt (6), assigned to D2; Brazil (7), assigned to C2; Cuba (9), assigned to B2; Tunisia (11), assigned to A2	Mexico (12); Pakistan (13); Bulgaria (15); France (16); India (16)	Venezuela (16); Algeria (16); Poland (22); Romania (30); Turkey (32)

=== Draw ===
The draw procedure for the pools composition also followed the serpentine system and was as follows:

- Teams from pot 2 were then drawn and placed in line 4 of each pool starting from pool A to pool E.
- Teams from pot 1 were drawn at the end and were placed in line 3 of each pool starting from pool E to pool A.

The pools composition after the original draw was as follow:

Pool A
Pos	Team
A1	Qatar
A2	Tunisia
A3	France
A4	Venezuela

Pool B
Pos	Team
B1	Italy
B2	Cuba
B3	India
B4	Romania

Pool C
Pos	Team
C1	Argentina
C2	Brazil
C3	Mexico
C4	Poland

Pool D
Pos	Team
D1	Spain
D2	Egypt
D3	Bulgaria
D4	Turkey

Pool E
Pos	Team
E1	Iran
E2	Chinese Taipei
E3	Pakistan
E4	Algeria

== Preliminary round ==
- All times are Arabia Standard Time (UTC+03:00).

=== Pool A ===
Pos	Team	Pld	W	L	Pts	SW	SL	SR	SPW	SPL	SPR	Qualification
1	France	3	3	0	9	9	0	MAX	227	136	1.669	Advance to round of 16
2	Tunisia	3	2	1	6	6	4	1.500	221	211	1.047	Advance to round of 16
3	Venezuela	3	1	2	3	4	6	0.667	215	229	0.939	Advance to round of 16
4	Qatar (H)	3	0	3	0	0	9	0.000	138	225	0.613	

Source: FIVB Volleyball Boys' U17 World Championship 2026 - Standings
(H) Host

Date	Time		Score		Set 1	Set 2	Set 3	Set 4	Set 5	Total	Attd	Report
19 Aug	17:00	Qatar	0–3	Venezuela	16–25	16–25	23–25			55–75	315	P2 Report
20 Aug	11:00	Tunisia	0–3	France	17–25	13–25	19–25			49–75	120	P2 Report
21 Aug	17:00	Qatar	0–3	France	11–25	11–25	11–25			33–75	470	P2 Report
22 Aug	11:00	Tunisia	3–1	Venezuela	25–22	22–25	25–16	25–23		97–86	115	P2 Report
23 Aug	17:00	Qatar	0–3	Tunisia	15–25	18–25	17–25			50–75	275	P2 Report
24 Aug	11:00	France	3–0	Venezuela	27–25	25–14	25–15			77–54	105	P2 Report

=== Pool B ===
Pos	Team	Pld	W	L	Pts	SW	SL	SR	SPW	SPL	SPR	Qualification
1	Italy	3	3	0	9	9	1	9.000	245	205	1.195	Advance to round of 16
2	Romania	3	2	1	6	6	4	1.500	241	209	1.153	Advance to round of 16
3	India	3	1	2	3	5	6	0.833	238	255	0.933	Advance to round of 16
4	Cuba	3	0	3	0	0	9	0.000	173	228	0.759	

Source: FIVB Volleyball Boys' U17 World Championship 2026 - Standings

Date	Time		Score		Set 1	Set 2	Set 3	Set 4	Set 5	Total	Attd	Report
19 Aug	14:00	Italy	3–0	Romania	26–24	25–22	25–21			76–67	120	P2 Report
20 Aug	14:00	Cuba	0–3	India	18–25	24–26	22–25			64–76	120	P2 Report
21 Aug	14:00	Italy	3–1	India	25–20	18–25	25–19	25–18		93–82	146	P2 Report
22 Aug	14:00	Cuba	0–3	Romania	14–25	24–26	15–25			53–76		P2 Report
23 Aug	14:00	Italy	3–0	Cuba	25–22	25–10	26–24			76–56	135	P2 Report
24 Aug	14:00	India	1–3	Romania	21–25	25–23	18–25	16–25		80–98	108	P2 Report

=== Pool C ===
Pos	Team	Pld	W	L	Pts	SW	SL	SR	SPW	SPL	SPR	Qualification
1	Brazil	3	3	0	8	9	2	4.500	262	199	1.317	Advance to round of 16
2	Poland	3	2	1	7	8	4	2.000	272	265	1.026	Advance to round of 16
3	Argentina	3	1	2	3	3	6	0.500	193	215	0.898	Advance to round of 16
4	Mexico	3	0	3	0	1	9	0.111	205	253	0.810	

Source: FIVB Volleyball Boys' U17 World Championship 2026 - Standings

Date	Time		Score		Set 1	Set 2	Set 3	Set 4	Set 5	Total	Attd	Report
19 Aug	11:00	Argentina	0–3	Poland	20–25	24–26	19–25			63–76	65	P2 Report
20 Aug	14:00	Brazil	3–0	Mexico	25–16	25–16	25–19			75–51	120	P2 Report
21 Aug	11:00	Argentina	3–0	Mexico	25–20	25–22	25–22			75–64	70	P2 Report
22 Aug	14:00	Brazil	3–2	Poland	25–12	23–25	25–17	23–25	16–14	112–93	285	P2 Report
23 Aug	11:00	Argentina	0–3	Brazil	19–25	15–25	21–25			55–75	110	P2 Report
24 Aug	14:00	Mexico	1–3	Poland	30–28	17–25	23–25	20–25		90–103	102	P2 Report

=== Pool D ===
Pos	Team	Pld	W	L	Pts	SW	SL	SR	SPW	SPL	SPR	Qualification
1	Bulgaria	3	3	0	9	9	2	4.500	267	241	1.108	Advance to round of 16
2	Egypt	3	2	1	4	6	7	0.857	273	286	0.955	Advance to round of 16
3	Turkey	3	1	2	4	6	6	1.000	272	261	1.042	Advance to round of 16
4	Spain	3	0	3	1	3	9	0.333	259	283	0.915	Advance to round of 16

Source: FIVB Volleyball Boys' U17 World Championship 2026 - Standings

Date	Time		Score		Set 1	Set 2	Set 3	Set 4	Set 5	Total	Attd	Report
19 Aug	17:00	Spain	0–3	Turkey	24–26	24–26	17–25			65–77	650	P2 Report
20 Aug	17:00	Egypt	0–3	Bulgaria	22–25	23–25	18–25			63–75	120	P2 Report
21 Aug	17:00	Spain	1–3	Bulgaria	28–30	22–25	25–19	16–25		91–99	178	P2 Report
22 Aug	17:00	Egypt	3–2	Turkey	17–25	25–22	26–24	20–25	15–12	103–108	820	P2 Report
23 Aug	17:00	Spain	2–3	Egypt	18–25	25–21	25–27	25–19	10–15	103–107	320	P2 Report
24 Aug	17:00	Bulgaria	3–1	Turkey	25–23	18–25	25–19	25–20		93–87	130	P2 Report

=== Pool E ===
Pos	Team	Pld	W	L	Pts	SW	SL	SR	SPW	SPL	SPR	Qualification
1	Iran	3	3	0	9	9	0	MAX	225	164	1.372	Advance to round of 16
2	Pakistan	3	2	1	6	6	3	2.000	213	179	1.190	Advance to round of 16
3	Chinese Taipei	3	1	2	2	3	8	0.375	213	257	0.829	Advance to round of 16
4	Algeria	3	0	3	1	2	9	0.222	206	257	0.802	

Source: FIVB Volleyball Boys' U17 World Championship 2026 - Standings

Date	Time		Score		Set 1	Set 2	Set 3	Set 4	Set 5	Total	Attd	Report
19 Aug	14:00	Iran	3–0	Algeria	25–15	25–19	25–14			75–48	55	P2 Report
20 Aug	17:00	Chinese Taipei	0–3	Pakistan	20–25	10–25	23–25			53–75	77	P2 Report
21 Aug	14:00	Iran	3–0	Pakistan	25–23	25–22	25–18			75–63	215	P2 Report
22 Aug	17:00	Chinese Taipei	3–2	Algeria	20–25	22–25	25–22	25–23	15–12	107–107	115	P2 Report
23 Aug	14:00	Iran	3–0	Chinese Taipei	25–15	25–21	25–17			75–53	65	P2 Report
24 Aug	17:00	Pakistan	3–0	Algeria	25–17	25–17	25–17			75–51	120	P2 Report

=== Combined rankings ===
Pos	Pool	Team	Pld	W	L	Pts	SW	SL	SR	SPW	SPL	SPR	Qualification
1	A	France	3	3	0	9	9	0	MAX	227	136	1.669	Advance to round of 16
2	E	Iran	3	3	0	9	9	0	MAX	225	164	1.372	Advance to round of 16
3	B	Italy	3	3	0	9	9	1	9.000	245	205	1.195	Advance to round of 16
4	D	Bulgaria	3	3	0	9	9	2	4.500	267	241	1.108	Advance to round of 16
5	C	Brazil	3	3	0	8	9	2	4.500	262	199	1.317	Advance to round of 16
6	C	Poland	3	2	1	7	8	4	2.000	272	265	1.026	Advance to round of 16
7	E	Pakistan	3	2	1	6	6	3	2.000	213	179	1.190	Advance to round of 16
8	B	Romania	3	2	1	6	6	4	1.500	241	209	1.153	Advance to round of 16
9	A	Tunisia	3	2	1	6	6	4	1.500	221	211	1.047	Advance to round of 16
10	D	Egypt	3	2	1	4	6	7	0.857	273	286	0.955	Advance to round of 16
11	D	Turkey	3	1	2	4	6	6	1.000	272	261	1.042	Advance to round of 16
12	B	India	3	1	2	3	5	6	0.833	238	255	0.933	Advance to round of 16
13	A	Venezuela	3	1	2	3	4	6	0.667	215	229	0.939	Advance to round of 16
14	C	Argentina	3	1	2	3	3	6	0.500	193	215	0.898	Advance to round of 16
15	E	Chinese Taipei	3	1	2	2	3	8	0.375	213	257	0.829	Advance to round of 16
16	D	Spain	3	0	3	1	3	9	0.333	259	283	0.915	Advance to round of 16
17	E	Algeria	3	0	3	1	2	9	0.222	206	257	0.802	
18	C	Mexico	3	0	3	0	1	9	0.111	205	253	0.810	
19	B	Cuba	3	0	3	0	0	9	0.000	173	228	0.759	
20	A	Qatar (H)	3	0	3	0	0	9	0.000	138	225	0.613	

Source: FIVB Volleyball Boys' U17 World Championship 2026 - Standings
(H) Host

== Final round ==
- All times are Arabia Standard Time (UTC+03:00).

Round of 16
25 August
France	3
Spain	2
25 August
Romania	3
Tunisia	1
25 August
Bulgaria	2
Venezuela	3
25 August
Brazil	3
India	0
25 August
Iran	3
Chinese Taipei	0
25 August
Pakistan	3
Egypt	2
25 August
Italy	1
Argentina	3
25 August
Poland	3
Turkey	2

Quarter-finals
27 August
France	3
Romania	0
27 August
Venezuela	0
Brazil	3
27 August
Iran	3
Pakistan	2
27 August
Argentina	3
Poland	0

Semi-finals
28 August
France	3
Brazil	1
28 August
Iran	3
Argentina	0

Final
29 August
France	1
Iran	3
Third place match
29 August
Brazil	3
Argentina	1

=== Round of 16 ===
Date	Time		Score		Set 1	Set 2	Set 3	Set 4	Set 5	Total	Attd	Report
25 Aug	11:00	France	3–2	Spain	23–25	25–19	25–16	23–25	15–10	111–95	95	P2 Report
25 Aug	11:00	Iran	3–0	Chinese Taipei	25–18	25–19	25–21			75–58	45	P2 Report
25 Aug	14:00	Bulgaria	2–3	Venezuela	30–28	25–17	19–25	18–25	12–15	104–110	53	P2 Report
25 Aug	14:00	Italy	1–3	Argentina	20–25	23–25	25–20	16–25		84–95	80	P2 Report
25 Aug	17:05	Poland	3–2	Turkey	22–25	25–27	25–20	25–22	15–9	112–103	250	P2 Report
25 Aug	17:10	Brazil	3–0	India	25–17	25–13	25–14			75–44	125	P2 Report
25 Aug	20:00	Pakistan	3–2	Egypt	17–25	21–25	25–18	25–15	15–12	103–95	230	P2 Report
25 Aug	20:20	Romania	3–1	Tunisia	25–16	25–11	23–25	25–19		98–71	93	P2 Report

=== Quarter-finals ===
Date	Time		Score		Set 1	Set 2	Set 3	Set 4	Set 5	Total	Attd	Report
27 Aug	11:00	France	3–0	Romania	25–17	25–19	25–21			75–57	100	P2 Report
27 Aug	14:00	Venezuela	0–3	Brazil	19–25	13–25	14–25			46–75	205	P2 Report
27 Aug	17:00	Iran	3–2	Pakistan	25–23	20–25	17–25	25–11	16–14	103–98	430	P2 Report
27 Aug	20:15	Argentina	3–0	Poland	25–18	25–22	25–20			75–60	497	P2 Report

=== Semi-finals ===
Date	Time		Score		Set 1	Set 2	Set 3	Set 4	Set 5	Total	Attd	Report
28 Aug	14:00	France	3–1	Brazil	23–25	25–19	25–21	25–21		98–86	470	P2 Report
28 Aug	17:00	Iran	3–0	Argentina	25–19	29–27	25–13			79–59	520	P2 Report

=== Third place match ===
Date	Time		Score		Set 1	Set 2	Set 3	Set 4	Set 5	Total	Attd	Report
29 Aug	14:00	Brazil	3–1	Argentina	21–25	25–17	25–18	25–13		96–73	305	P2 Report

=== Final ===
Date	Time		Score		Set 1	Set 2	Set 3	Set 4	Set 5	Total	Attd	Report
29 Aug	17:00	France	1–3	Iran	18–25	15–25	25–22	12–25		70–97	830	P2 Report

== Final standing ==
Rank	Team
1st place, gold medalist(s)	Iran
2nd place, silver medalist(s)	France
3rd place, bronze medalist(s)	Brazil
4	Argentina
5	Pakistan
6	Poland
7	Romania
8	Venezuela
9	Bulgaria
10	Italy
11	Tunisia
12	Egypt
13	Turkey
14	India
15	Chinese Taipei
16	Spain
17	Algeria
18	Mexico
19	Cuba
20	Qatar

Qualified for the 2028 World Championship

2026 Boys' U17 World champions

Iran
1st title

14–boy roster
1 Aidin Pouzesh, 4 Akam Ebrahimnezhad, 5 Parsa Maghsoudi (L), 6 Mohammadreza Zibaei, 7 Azhvan Namazi, 8 Sina Hazrati (c), 9 Arash Ashrafi, 10 Seyyedamirreza Mirhosseinimashhadisaraei, 11 Yasin Asadizadeh Abdehgah, 15 Monib Sheikh, 19 Amirreza Faramarzidarghelou, 55 Radan Salehi, 64 Hamze Aghcheli, 88 Sina Ahmadi (L)
Head coach: Arash Sadeghiany

== Awards ==
The following individual awards were presented at the end of the tournament.

- Most valuable player (MVP)
  Sina Hazrati (IRI)
- Best setter
  Akam Ebrahimnezhad (IRI)
- Best outside spikers
  Jaden Ébagne Yon (FRA)
  Valentín Bianchi (ARG)
- Best middle blockers
  Monib Sheikh (IRI)
  Lucas de Abreu (BRA)
- Best opposite spiker
  Sina Hazrati (IRI)
- Best libero
  Corentin Agnèse (FRA)
