= 2011 Boys' U17 South American Volleyball Championship =

Tournament details
- Host country: Ecuador
- Dates: November 16–20
- Teams: 8
- Venue: 1 (in 1 host city)

Final positions
- Champions: Brazil (1st title)

Tournament awards
- MVP: Enrico Zappoli (BRA)

The 2011 Boys' U17 South American Volleyball Championship was the 1st edition of the tournament, organised by South America's governing volleyball body, the Confederación Sudamericana de Voleibol (CSV). It was held in Guayaquil, Ecuador from November 16 to 20, 2011.

== Teams ==
Teams

Argentina
Brazil
Chile
Colombia
Ecuador
Peru
Uruguay
Venezuela

== Competition System ==
The competition system for the First Boys' U17 South American Championship consist of two rounds, the first round was a Round-Robin system. Each team plays once against each of the 7 remaining teams with each team playing two matches in a day against different teams.

According to the final ranking in the first round, the best four teams will play in the semifinals (1º VS 4º and 2º VS 3º), the winners will play for the Gold Medal while the losers will play for the bronze medal.

All matches in the preliminary round and the semifinals are played best out of three sets, the third place match and the Gold Medal match are played best out of 5 as normal senior tournaments.

== Matches ==
All times are Ecuador Standard Time (UTC-5)

=== Standings ===
Pos	Team	Pld	W	L	Pts	SW	SL	SR	SPW	SPL	SPR	Qualification
1	Brazil	7	6	1	13	13	2	6.500	355	237	1.498	Semifinals
2	Chile	7	6	1	13	13	5	2.600	377	320	1.178	Semifinals
3	Argentina	7	5	2	12	10	5	2.000	333	287	1.160	Semifinals
4	Venezuela	7	4	3	11	9	6	1.500	352	307	1.147	Semifinals
5	Ecuador	7	4	3	11	9	7	1.286	325	315	1.032	
6	Colombia	7	2	5	9	5	10	0.500	317	310	1.023	
7	Peru	7	1	6	8	2	13	0.154	246	344	0.715	
8	Uruguay	7	0	7	7	1	14	0.071	170	361	0.471	

==== Day 1 ====
Date	Time		Score		Set 1	Set 2	Set 3	Total	Report
16 Nov	8:30	Ecuador	2–0	Peru	25–12	25–20		50–32	
16 Nov	9:45	Chile	2–0	Uruguay	25–10	25–5		50–15	
16 Nov	11:00	Venezuela	2–0	Colombia	26–24	25–23		51–47	
16 Nov	12:15	Argentina	0–2	Brazil	15–25	18–25		33–50	
16 Nov	15:30	Ecuador	2–0	Uruguay	25–12	25–12		50–24	
16 Nov	16:45	Venezuela	2–0	Peru	25–12	25–23		50–35	
16 Nov	18:00	Brazil	1–2	Chile	14–25	25–12	14–16	51–55	
16 Nov	19:15	Colombia	0–2	Argentina	16–25	23–25		39–50	

==== Day 2 ====
Date	Time		Score		Set 1	Set 2	Set 3	Total	Report
17 Nov	8:30	Venezuela	0–2	Brazil	21–25	21–25		42–50	
17 Nov	9:45	Argentina	2–0	Uruguay	25–6	25–7		50–13	
17 Nov	11:00	Colombia	2–0	Peru	25–8	25–18		50–26	
17 Nov	12:15	Ecuador	2–1	Chile	25–19	16–25	15–13	56–57	
17 Nov	15:30	Venezuela	2–0	Uruguay	25–15	25–17		50–32	
17 Nov	16:45	Brazil	2–0	Peru	25–9	25–11		50–20	
17 Nov	18:00	Argentina	0–2	Chile	21–25	18–25		39–50	
17 Nov	19:15	Ecuador	2–0	Colombia	25–21	25–22		50–43	

==== Day 3 ====
Date	Time		Score		Set 1	Set 2	Set 3	Total	Report
18 Nov	8:30	Chile	2–1	Colombia	21–25	25–19	15–12	61–56	
18 Nov	9:45	Peru	0–2	Argentina	19–25	15–25		34–50	
18 Nov	11:00	Uruguay	0–2	Brazil	13–25	7–25		20–50	
18 Nov	12:15	Venezuela	2–0	Ecuador	25–14	25–19		50–33	
18 Nov	15:30	Peru	0–2	Chile	17–25	21–25		38–50	
18 Nov	16:45	Uruguay	0–2	Colombia	10–25	12–25		22–50	
18 Nov	18:00	Venezuela	0–2	Argentina	24–26	24–26		48–52	
18 Nov	19:15	Ecuador	0–2	Brazil	19–25	20–25		39–50	

==== Day 4 ====
Date	Time		Score		Set 1	Set 2	Set 3	Total	Report
19 Nov	8:30	Uruguay	1–2	Peru	11–25	25–21	8–15	44–61	
19 Nov	9:45	Brazil	2–0	Colombia	25–16	25–16		50–32	
19 Nov	11:00	Ecuador	1–2	Argentina	25–19	21–25	7–15	53–59	
19 Nov	12:15	Venezuela	1–2	Chile	25–16	21–25	15–17	61–58	

== Final round ==
=== 5th/8th bracket ===
5th/8th bracket
2011-11-19 - Guayaquil
Colombia	2
Peru	0
2011-11-19 - Guayaquil
Ecuador	2
Uruguay	0

5th place match
2011-11-20 - Guayaquil
Colombia	1
Ecuador	2
7th place match
2011-11-20 - Guayaquil
Peru	2
Uruguay	0

=== Championship bracket ===
Semifinals
2011-11-20 - Guayaquil
Brazil	2
Venezuela	0
2011-11-20 - Guayaquil
Chile	0
Argentina	2

Final
2011-11-20 - Guayaquil
Brazil	3
Argentina	2
3rd place
2011-11-20 - Guayaquil
Venezuela	1
Chile	3

=== 5th to 8th classification ===
Date	Time		Score		Set 1	Set 2	Set 3	Total	Report
19 Nov	16:30	Colombia	2–0	Peru	25–15	25–17		50–32	
19 Nov	17:45	Ecuador	2–0	Uruguay	25–10	25–6		50–16	

=== Semifinals ===
Date	Time		Score		Set 1	Set 2	Set 3	Total	Report
20 Nov	8:30	Brazil	2–0	Venezuela	25–15	25–14		50–29	
20 Nov	9:45	Chile	0–2	Argentina	17–25	20–25		37–50	

=== Seventh place match ===
Date	Time		Score		Set 1	Set 2	Set 3	Total	Report
20 Nov	11:00	Peru	2–0	Uruguay	25–23	25–18		50–41	

=== Fifth place match ===
Date	Time		Score		Set 1	Set 2	Set 3	Total	Report
20 Nov	12:15	Colombia	1–2	Ecuador	25–23	20–25	11–15	56–63	

=== Bronze Medal match ===
Date	Time		Score		Set 1	Set 2	Set 3	Set 4	Set 5	Total
20 Nov	16:00	Venezuela	1–3	Chile	25–20	20–25	25–21	25–23		95–89

=== Gold Medal match ===
Date	Time		Score		Set 1	Set 2	Set 3	Set 4	Set 5	Total
20 Nov	18:00	Brazil	3–2	Argentina	23–25	25–16	24–26	25–16	19–17	116–100

== Final standing ==
Rank	Team
1st place, gold medalist(s)	Brazil
2nd place, silver medalist(s)	Argentina
3rd place, bronze medalist(s)	Chile
4	Venezuela
5	Ecuador
6	Colombia
7	Peru
8	Uruguay

2011 Boys' U17 South American Volleyball champions

Brazil
1st title
