= Boys' U17 South American Volleyball Championship =

- Sport: Volleyball
- Founded: 2011
- Continent: South America (CSV)
- Most recent champion: Brazil (3rd title)
- Most titles: Brazil (3 titles)

The Boys' U17 South American Volleyball Championship is a sport competition for national volleyball teams with players under 17 years, currently held biannually and organized by the Confederación Sudamericana de Voleibol (CSV), the South American volleyball federation.

== Results summary ==
Year	Host	Final			3rd place match			Teams
Year	Host	Champions	Score	Runners-up	3rd place	Score	4th place	Teams
2011; Details	(Ecuador); Guayaquil	Brazil	3–2	Argentina	Chile	3–1	Venezuela	8
2013; Details	(Brazil); Saquarema	Argentina	3–2	Brazil	Colombia	3–1	Chile	6
2014; Details	(Argentina); Bariloche	Argentina	3–0	Paraguay	Chile	3–0	Peru	4
2023; Details	(Brazil); Araguari	Brazil	Round-robin	Argentina	Chile	Round-robin	Peru	5
2026; Details	(Argentina); Comodoro Rivadavia	Brazil	Round-robin	Argentina	Venezuela	Round-robin	Chile	5

== Medals summary ==
Rank	Nation	Gold	Silver	Bronze	Total
1	Brazil	3	1	0	4
2	Argentina	2	3	0	5
3	Paraguay	0	1	0	1
4	Chile	0	0	3	3
5	Colombia	0	0	1	1
5	Venezuela	0	0	1	1
Totals (6 entries)		5	5	5	15

== See also ==
- Girls' U17 South American Volleyball Championship
- Men's Junior South American Volleyball Championship
- Men's U23 South American Volleyball Championship
- Boys' Youth South American Volleyball Championship
