= 2023 Asian Men's U16 Volleyball Championship =

- Official logo

Tournament details
- Host country: Uzbekistan
- City: Tashkent
- Dates: 22–29 July
- Teams: 12
- Venue: 2 (in 1 host city)

Final positions
- Champions: Iran (1st title)
- Runners-up: Uzbekistan
- Third place: Chinese Taipei
- Fourth place: Pakistan

Tournament statistics
- Matches played: 34
- Attendance: 13,260 (390 per match)

The 2023 Asian Men's U16 Volleyball Championship was the inaugural edition of the Asian Men's U16 Volleyball Championship, a biennial international volleyball tournament organised by Asian Volleyball Confederation (AVC) with Volleyball Federation of Uzbekistan (UZBV). The tournament was held in Tashkent, Uzbekistan from 22 to 29 July 2023.

This tournament served as a qualification tournament for the FIVB Volleyball Boys' U17 World Championship. The top three teams of the tournament qualified for the 2024 FIVB Volleyball Boys' U17 World Championship as the AVC representatives.

Players must be born on or after January 1, 2007.

== Pools composition ==
The overview of pools was released on 16 March 2023.

Pool A	Pool B	Pool C	Pool D
Uzbekistan (H)	~~Bahrain~~*	Saudi Arabia	~~Kuwait~~*
Kazakhstan	~~India~~*	Iran	Pakistan
Hong Kong	Thailand	Japan	Mongolia
—N/a	Australia	China	Chinese Taipei

* Kuwait, Bahrain and India withdrew from the tournament.

== Format ==
All teams are divided into 4 pools. Robin round to classify ranking. Top 2 teams advance to top 8, split to Pool E (for teams from Pools A and C) and Pool F (for teams from Pools B and D). After that, teams will play cross matches to determine the best two teams from Pools E and F to qualify for the 1-4 semifinals, with teams finishing third and fourth places in each pool relegated to Classification Round for ranking 5–8.

The lower-ranked teams finishing third in Pools A, C and D and fourth in Pool C will next play a single round-robin competition. Teams which have already met in the pool round-robin preliminaries will not play again, but their results in the pool play will be taken into consideration for ranking 9–12.

== Venue ==
Assigned matches	Assigned matches
Tashkent, Uzbekistan
Yunusobod	JAR
Capacity: unknown

== Pool standing procedure ==
1. Number of Victories
2. Match points
3. Set quotient
4. Points quotient
5. If the tie continues as per the point quotient between two teams, the priority will be given to the team which won the last match between them. When the tie in points quotient is between three or more teams, a new classification of these teams in the terms of points 1, 2 and 3 will be made taking into consideration only the matches in which they were opposed to each other.

Match won 3–0 or 3–1: 3 match points for the winner, 0 match points for the loser
Match won 3–2: 2 match points for the winner, 1 match point for the loser

== Preliminary round ==
- All times are Uzbekistan time (UTC+05:00).

=== Pool A ===
Pos	Team	Pld	W	L	Pts	SW	SL	SR	SPW	SPL	SPR	Qualification
1	Uzbekistan	2	2	0	6	6	0	MAX	150	108	1.389	Pool E
2	Kazakhstan	2	1	1	3	3	3	1.000	135	129	1.047	Pool E
3	Hong Kong	2	0	2	0	0	6	0.000	102	150	0.680	Pool G

Source: Match Result

Date	Time	Venue		Score		Set 1	Set 2	Set 3	Set 4	Set 5	Total	Report
22 Jul	17:30	YSB	Hong Kong	0–3	Uzbekistan	15–25	16–25	17–25			48–75	Report
23 Jul	15:00	YSB	Kazakhstan	3–0	Hong Kong	25–21	25–15	25–18			75–54	Report
24 Jul	17:30	YSB	Uzbekistan	3–0	Kazakhstan	25–21	25–19	25–20			75–60	Report

=== Pool B ===
Pos	Team	Pld	W	L	Pts	SW	SL	SR	SPW	SPL	SPR	Qualification
1	Thailand	1	1	0	3	3	1	3.000	96	75	1.280	Pool F
2	Australia	1	0	1	0	1	3	0.333	75	96	0.781	Pool F

Source: Match Result

Date	Time	Venue		Score		Set 1	Set 2	Set 3	Set 4	Set 5	Total	Report
24 Jul	10:00	YSB	Australia	1–3	Thailand	17–25	25–21	18–25	15–25		75–96	Report

=== Pool C ===
Pos	Team	Pld	W	L	Pts	SW	SL	SR	SPW	SPL	SPR	Qualification
1	Iran	3	3	0	8	9	2	4.500	260	201	1.294	Pool E
2	Japan	3	2	1	7	8	4	2.000	273	232	1.177	Pool E
3	China	3	1	2	3	4	6	0.667	226	228	0.991	Pool G
4	Saudi Arabia	3	0	3	0	0	9	0.000	127	225	0.564	Pool G

Source: Match Result

Date	Time	Venue		Score		Set 1	Set 2	Set 3	Set 4	Set 5	Total	Report
22 Jul	10:30	YSB	Saudi Arabia	0–3	China	19–25	20–25	12–25			51–75	Report
22 Jul	15:00	YSB	Iran	3–2	Japan	22–25	17–25	25–20	25–22	15–10	104–102	Report
23 Jul	12:30	YSB	Japan	3–0	Saudi Arabia	25–18	25–18	25–10			75–46	Report
23 Jul	17:30	YSB	Iran	3–0	China	31–29	25–17	25–23			81–69	Report
24 Jul	12:30	YSB	China	1–3	Japan	16–25	25–21	18–25	23–25		82–96	Report
24 Jul	15:00	YSB	Iran	3–0	Saudi Arabia	25–12	25–6	25–12			75–30	Report

=== Pool D ===
Pos	Team	Pld	W	L	Pts	SW	SL	SR	SPW	SPL	SPR	Qualification
1	Pakistan	2	2	0	6	6	0	MAX	150	88	1.705	Pool F
2	Chinese Taipei	2	1	1	3	3	3	1.000	124	111	1.117	Pool F
3	Mongolia	2	0	2	0	0	6	0.000	75	150	0.500	Pool G

Source: Match Result

Date	Time	Venue		Score		Set 1	Set 2	Set 3	Set 4	Set 5	Total	Report
22 Jul	12:30	YSB	Chinese Taipei	0–3	Pakistan	15–25	18–25	16–25			49–75	Report
23 Jul	10:00	YSB	Mongolia	0–3	Chinese Taipei	20–25	12–25	4–25			36–75	Report
24 Jul	15:00	JAR	Pakistan	3–0	Mongolia	25–9	25–17	25–13			75–39	Report

== Classification round ==
- All times are Uzbekistan time (UTC+05:00).
- The results and the points of the matches between the same teams that were already played during the preliminary round shall be taken into account for the classification round.

=== Pool E ===
Pos	Team	Pld	W	L	Pts	SW	SL	SR	SPW	SPL	SPR	Qualification
1	Iran	3	3	0	8	9	4	2.250	305	266	1.147	Semifinals
2	Uzbekistan	3	1	2	4	6	6	1.000	264	271	0.974	Semifinals
3	Kazakhstan	3	1	2	3	4	6	0.667	216	234	0.923	5th–8th places
4	Japan	3	1	2	3	5	8	0.625	271	285	0.951	5th–8th places

Source: Match Result

Date	Time	Venue		Score		Set 1	Set 2	Set 3	Set 4	Set 5	Total	Report
26 Jul	10:00	YSB	Kazakhstan	1–3	Iran	15–25	25–23	20–25	19–25		79–98	Report
26 Jul	17:30	YSB	Uzbekistan	2–3	Japan	22–25	19–25	25–23	25–20	13–15	104–108	Report
27 Jul	15:00	YSB	Kazakhstan	3–0	Japan	25–18	25–18	27–25			77–61	Report
27 Jul	17:30	YSB	Uzbekistan	1–3	Iran	26–24	17–25	15–25	27–29		85–103	Report

=== Pool F ===
Pos	Team	Pld	W	L	Pts	SW	SL	SR	SPW	SPL	SPR	Qualification
1	Pakistan	3	3	0	9	9	0	MAX	225	139	1.619	Semifinals
2	Chinese Taipei	3	2	1	6	8	5	1.600	232	208	1.115	Semifinals
3	Thailand	3	1	2	4	5	6	0.833	244	258	0.946	5th–8th places
4	Australia	3	0	3	0	1	9	0.111	150	246	0.610	5th–8th places

Source: Match Result

Date	Time	Venue		Score		Set 1	Set 2	Set 3	Set 4	Set 5	Total	Report
26 Jul	12:30	YSB	Thailand	2–3	Chinese Taipei	25–16	26–28	16–25	26–24	11–15	104–108	Report
26 Jul	15:00	YSB	Australia	0–3	Pakistan	13–25	19–25	14–25			46–75	Report
27 Jul	10:00	YSB	Australia	0–3	Chinese Taipei	1–25	11–25	17–25			29–75	Report
27 Jul	12:30	YSB	Thailand	0–3	Pakistan	9–25	16–25	19–25			44–75	Report

=== Pool G ===
Pos	Team	Pld	W	L	Pts	SW	SL	SR	SPW	SPL	SPR
9	China	3	3	0	9	9	0	MAX	247	187	1.321
10	Mongolia	3	2	1	6	6	4	1.500	227	202	1.124
11	Hong Kong	3	1	2	3	4	6	0.667	200	238	0.840
12	Saudi Arabia	3	0	3	0	1	9	0.111	200	242	0.826

Source: Match Result

Date	Time	Venue		Score		Set 1	Set 2	Set 3	Set 4	Set 5	Total	Report
26 Jul	12:30	JAR	Hong Kong	3–0	Saudi Arabia	25–23	25–21	25–23			75–67	Report
26 Jul	15:00	JAR	Mongolia	0–3	China	24–26	17–25	19–25			60–76	Report
27 Jul	12:30	JAR	Hong Kong	1–3	China	21–25	15–25	25–21	15–25		76–96	Report
27 Jul	15:00	JAR	Mongolia	3–1	Saudi Arabia	17–25	25–19	25–17	25–16		92–77	Report
28 Jul	15:00	JAR	Hong Kong	0–3	Mongolia	15–25	15–25	19–25			49–75	Report

== Final round ==
- All times are Uzbekistan time (UTC+05:00).

=== 5th–8th places ===
5th–8th semifinals
28 Jul
Kazakhstan	3
Australia	1
28 Jul
Japan	3
Thailand	2

5th place match
29 Jul
Kazakhstan	0
Japan	3
7th place match
29 Jul
Australia	1
Thailand	3

==== 5th–8th semifinals ====
Date	Time	Venue		Score		Set 1	Set 2	Set 3	Set 4	Set 5	Total	Report
28 Jul	10:00	YSB	Kazakhstan	3–1	Australia	25–20	26–24	28–30	25–17		104–91	Report
28 Jul	12:30	YSB	Japan	3–2	Thailand	17–25	25–15	22–25	25–18	15–9	104–92	Report

==== 7th place match ====
Date	Time	Venue		Score		Set 1	Set 2	Set 3	Set 4	Set 5	Total	Report
29 Jul	10:00	YSB	Australia	1–3	Thailand	21–25	25–22	24–26	23–25		93–98	Report

==== 5th place match ====
Date	Time	Venue		Score		Set 1	Set 2	Set 3	Set 4	Set 5	Total	Report
29 Jul	12:30	YSB	Kazakhstan	0–3	Japan	12–25	20–25	18–25			50–75	Report

=== Final four ===
Semifinals
28 Jul
Iran	3
Chinese Taipei	2
28 Jul
Uzbekistan	3
Pakistan	1

Final
29 Jul
Iran	3
Uzbekistan	1
3rd place match
29 Jul
Chinese Taipei	3
Pakistan	1

==== Semifinals ====
Date	Time	Venue		Score		Set 1	Set 2	Set 3	Set 4	Set 5	Total	Report
28 Jul	15:00	YSB	Iran	3–2	Chinese Taipei	21–25	14–25	25–22	25–17	15–13	100–102	Report
28 Jul	17:30	YSB	Uzbekistan	3–1	Pakistan	25–23	25–21	17–25	25–23		92–92	Report

==== 3rd place match ====
Date	Time	Venue		Score		Set 1	Set 2	Set 3	Set 4	Set 5	Total	Report
29 Jul	15:00	YSB	Chinese Taipei	3–1	Pakistan	25–13	18–25	25–23	25–22		93–83	Report

==== Final ====
Date	Time	Venue		Score		Set 1	Set 2	Set 3	Set 4	Set 5	Total	Report
29 Jul	17:30	YSB	Iran	3–1	Uzbekistan	19–25	25–22	25–16	25–22		94–85	Report

== Final standing ==
Rank	Team
1st place, gold medalist(s)	Iran
2nd place, silver medalist(s)	Uzbekistan
3rd place, bronze medalist(s)	Chinese Taipei
4	Pakistan
5	Japan
6	Kazakhstan
7	Thailand
8	Australia
9	China
10	Mongolia
11	Hong Kong
12	Saudi Arabia

Qualified for the 2024 World Boys Championship

2023 Asian Men's U16 champions

Iran
1st title

== Awards ==
- Most valuable player
  Mohammad Raouf Khoshhal Dashliboroun (IRI)
- Best setter
  Halimov Shohruhxon (UZB)
- Best outside hitters
  Haydarov Ogabek (UZB)
  Mohammad Raouf Khoshhal Dashliboroun (IRI)
- Best middle blockers
  Taha Mohseni Bababdani (IRI)
  Liou Guan-Peng (TPE)
- Best opposite spiker
  Huang Pin-Yen (TPE)
- Best libero
  Masoud Eimery (IRI)

== See also ==
- 2023 Asian Women's U16 Volleyball Championship
- 2023 Asian Men's Volleyball Championship
