= Egypt men's national under-17 volleyball team =

Youth volleyball team representing Egypt

Egypt U-17
- Nickname(s): The Pharaohs
- Association: Egyptian Volleyball Federation
- Confederation: CAVB
- Head coach: Ahmed Mohamed Hassan

Uniforms
Home	Away	Third

FIVB U17 World Championship
- Appearances: 2 (First in 2024)
- Best result: 7th (2024)

African Championship
- Appearances: 1 (First in 2023)
- Best result: (gold) (2023)
- www.fevb.org (in Arabic)

The Egypt men's national under-17 volleyball team, represents Egypt in international volleyball competitions and friendly matches. The team is first Champion of African Champion 2023, 7th place in World Championship 2024.

== Results ==
Champions Runners up Third place Fourth place

- Green border color indicates tournament was held on home soil.

=== FIVB U17 World Championship ===
FIVB U17 World Championship
Year	Round	Position	Pld	W	L	SW	SL
(Bulgaria) 2024	Quarter-final	7th place	7	5	2	18	9
(Qatar) 2026	Round of 16	12th place	4	2	2	8	10
Total	2/2	0 Titles	11	7	4	26	19

=== African Championship U17 ===
African Championship U17
Year	Round	Position	Pld	W	L	SW	SL
(Libya) 2023	Final	Champions	4	4	0	12	0
Total	1/1	1 Titles	4	4	0	12	0

== Team ==
=== Current squad ===
The following is the Egyptian roster in the 2024 FIVB Volleyball Boys' U17 World Championship

Head Coach: Ahmed Mohamed Hassan

No.	Name	Date of birth	Height	Weight	Spike	Block
1	Zeyad Ghonim (C)	21/09/2008	189 cm			
3	Mohamed Ali	26/08/2008	179 cm			
4	Marwan Mohamed	10/01/2008	196 cm			
5	Ahmed Amer	05/06/2008	199 cm			
6	Mohand Basha	20/09/2008	165 cm			
7	Ahmed Hassaballa	22/03/2008	183 cm			
9	Mostafa Tayea	29/04/2008	198 cm			
11	Zyad Ahmed	09/01/2008	198 cm			
12	Alhabib Ahmed	02/02/2008	188 cm			
13	Hamza Ahmed	01/01/2008	192 cm			
15	Khaled Elfeki	21/06/2008	194 cm			
15	Fady Salem	10/03/2008	195 cm			

== See also ==
- Egypt men's national volleyball team
- Egypt men's national under-21 volleyball team
- Egypt men's national under-19 volleyball team
