= 2024 FIVB Volleyball Boys' U17 World Championship =

Световно първенство по волейбол за момчета до 17 години 2024

Tournament details
- Host country: Bulgaria
- City: Sofia
- Dates: 24–31 August 2024
- Teams: 16 (from 5 confederations)
- Venue: 2 (in 1 host city)

Final positions
- Champions: Italy (1st title)
- Runners-up: Argentina
- Third place: Chinese Taipei
- Fourth place: Spain

Tournament statistics
- Matches played: 49

The 2024 FIVB Volleyball Boys' U17 World Championship was the inaugural edition of the FIVB Volleyball Boys' U17 World Championship, the biennial international youth volleyball championship contested by the men's national teams under the age of 17 of the members associations of the Fédération Internationale de Volleyball (FIVB), the sport's global governing body. The tournament took place in Sofia, Bulgaria from 24 to 31 August 2024.

The FIVB U17 World Championship for both genders was proposed by the FIVB Volleyball Council and unanimously approved by the FIVB Board of Administration during its meeting held in March 2022.

== Host selection ==
On 8 November 2023, FIVB opened the bidding process for member associations whose countries were interested in hosting the Girls' and Boys' U17 World Championships planned to take place between 1 and 31 August 2024. The expression of interest of the member associations had to be submitted to FIVB no later than 18:00 CET (UTC+1) on 8 December 2023.

Bulgarian Volleyball Federation announced its bid in October 2023.

FIVB announced the hosts for both Girls' and Boys' U17 World Championships on 28 February 2024, with Bulgaria being selected to host the inaugural edition of the Boys' U17 World Championship. This will be the second FIVB age-group world championship hosted by Bulgaria after the 2021 FIVB Men's U21 World Championship which was co-hosted with Italy. Bulgaria also hosted both the Men's and Women's FIVB World Championships in 1970 and most recently the 2018 FIVB Men's World Championship (also co-hosted with Italy).

== Venues ==
Matches will take place at Levski Sofia Sports Hall and Hristo Botev Hall, both located in Sofia, the capital of Bulgaria. Levski Sofia Sports Hall is owned by the Levski Sofia sports club and is situated in southern Sofia. Hristo Botev is a multifunctional hall located in the Studentski grad district

Pancharevo	Locations of venues in Sofia city.	Studentski
Levski Sofia Sports Hall	Locations of venues in Sofia city.	Hristo Botev Hall
Capacity: 1,724	Locations of venues in Sofia city.	Capacity: 1.500

== Qualification ==
The qualification process was announced on 28 March 2023 with a total of 16 national teams to qualify for the final tournament. In addition to Bulgaria who qualified automatically as the host, 15 other teams qualified through five separate continental championships which were required to be held by 31 December 2023 at the latest.

The slot allocation per confederation was set as follows:

- AVC (Asia & Oceania): 3
- CAVB (Africa): 3
- CEV (Europe): 3
- CSV (South America): 3
- NORCECA (North, Central America and Caribbean): 3
- Host: 1

Confederation	Qualifying tournament	Team qualified
AVC (Asia & Oceania)	2023 Asian Men's U16 Volleyball Championship ( (Uzbekistan) Tashkent, 22–29 July)	Iran
AVC (Asia & Oceania)	2023 Asian Men's U16 Volleyball Championship ( (Uzbekistan) Tashkent, 22–29 July)	Uzbekistan
AVC (Asia & Oceania)	2023 Asian Men's U16 Volleyball Championship ( (Uzbekistan) Tashkent, 22–29 July)	Chinese Taipei
CAVB (Africa)	2023 Boys' U17 African Nations Volleyball Championship ( (Libya) Misrata, 12–19 December)	Egypt
CAVB (Africa)	2023 Boys' U17 African Nations Volleyball Championship ( (Libya) Misrata, 12–19 December)	Libya
CAVB (Africa)	2023 Boys' U17 African Nations Volleyball Championship ( (Libya) Misrata, 12–19 December)	Tunisia
CEV (Europe)	2023 Men's U17 European Volleyball Championship (Montenegro) Podgorica, 19–30 July)	Italy
CEV (Europe)	2023 Men's U17 European Volleyball Championship (Montenegro) Podgorica, 19–30 July)	Spain
CEV (Europe)	2023 Men's U17 European Volleyball Championship (Montenegro) Podgorica, 19–30 July)	Belgium
CEV (Europe)	Host nation	Bulgaria
CSV (South America)	2023 Boys' U17 South American Volleyball Championship ( (Brazil) Araguari, 23–27 August)	Brazil
CSV (South America)	2023 Boys' U17 South American Volleyball Championship ( (Brazil) Araguari, 23–27 August)	Argentina
CSV (South America)	2023 Boys' U17 South American Volleyball Championship ( (Brazil) Araguari, 23–27 August)	Chile
NORCECA (North, Central America and Caribbean)	2023 Boys' U17 NORCECA Volleyball Championship ( (Mexico) Poza Rica, 7–12 November)	Puerto Rico
NORCECA (North, Central America and Caribbean)	2023 Boys' U17 NORCECA Volleyball Championship ( (Mexico) Poza Rica, 7–12 November)	Mexico
NORCECA (North, Central America and Caribbean)	2023 Boys' U17 NORCECA Volleyball Championship ( (Mexico) Poza Rica, 7–12 November)	Cuba

== Pools composition ==
The draw for the pools composition was held on 1 May 2024, 14:30 (UTC±0), at the FIVB headquarters in Lausanne, Switzerland. The 16 teams were split into four pools of six. The hosts Bulgaria and the top three teams of the Boys' U19 FIVB World Ranking in force at that time were seeded in the first positions of each pool in alphabetical order from pool A to pool D. FIVB reserved the right to seed the host team as head of pool A regardless of their position in the World Ranking. The remaining 16 teams were divided into three pots of four, according to their position in the same Boys' U19 FIVB World Ranking, in order to be drawn to complete the following three positions in each pool.

Boys' U19 FIVB World Ranking of each team (as of 24 August 2023) are shown in brackets, except the hosts Bulgaria who ranked 5th.

Seeded teams	Teams to be drawn		
Line 1	Pot 1 (line 2)	Pot 2 (line 3)	Pot 3 (line 4)
Bulgaria (Hosts, assigned to A1); Iran (2), assigned to B1); Italy (6), assigned to C1; Belgium (7), assigned to D1	Egypt (8); Brazil (9); Argentina (11); Mexico (12)	Puerto Rico (16); Chile (20); Tunisia (22); Chinese Taipei (27)	Libya (31); Spain (42); Cuba (61); Uzbekistan (61)

The draw procedure followed the serpentine system and was as follows:

- Teams from pot 3 were drawn first and were placed in line 4 of each pool starting from pool D to pool A.
- Teams from pot 2 were then drawn and placed in line 3 of each pool starting from pool A to pool D.
- Teams from pot 1 were drawn at the end and were placed in line 2 of each pool starting from pool D to pool A.

The pools composition after the draw was as follow:

Pool A
Pos	Team
A1	Bulgaria
A2	Mexico
A3	Chinese Taipei
A4	Spain

Pool B
Pos	Team
B1	Iran
B2	Egypt
B3	Tunisia
B4	Libya

Pool C
Pos	Team
C1	Italy
C2	Argentina
C3	Puerto Rico
C4	Cuba

Pool D
Pos	Team
D1	Belgium
D2	Brazil
D3	Chile
D4	Uzbekistan

== Preliminary round ==
Groups A and C took place at the Levski Sofia Sports Hall, while Groups B and D took place at the Hristo Botev hall. All times are in local times, EEST (UTC+3), as listed by FIVB.

=== Pool A ===
Pos	Team	Pld	W	L	Pts	SW	SL	SR	SPW	SPL	SPR	Qualification
1	Spain	3	2	1	7	8	4	2.000	277	248	1.117	Round of 16
2	Chinese Taipei	3	2	1	6	8	5	1.600	289	275	1.051	Round of 16
3	Bulgaria (H)	3	2	1	5	7	6	1.167	294	287	1.024	Round of 16
4	Mexico	3	0	3	0	1	9	0.111	196	245	0.800	Round of 16

Source: FIVB
(H) Host

Date	Time		Score		Set 1	Set 2	Set 3	Set 4	Set 5	Total	Report
24 Aug	11:00	Mexico	0–3	Chinese Taipei	23–25	14–25	17–25			54–75	P2 Report
24 Aug	17:00	Bulgaria	1–3	Spain	20–25	25–21	19–25	20–25		84–96	P2 Report
25 Aug	11:00	Mexico	0–3	Spain	21–25	18–25	24–26			63–76	P2 Report
25 Aug	17:00	Bulgaria	3–2	Chinese Taipei	32–30	21–25	25–23	23–25	15–10	116–113	P2 Report
26 Aug	11:00	Chinese Taipei	3–2	Spain	25–20	25–23	14–25	22–25	15–12	101–105	P2 Report
26 Aug	17:00	Bulgaria	3–1	Mexico	25–17	25–21	19–25	25–15		94–78	P2 Report

=== Pool B ===
Pos	Team	Pld	W	L	Pts	SW	SL	SR	SPW	SPL	SPR	Qualification
1	Egypt	3	3	0	8	9	2	4.500	259	218	1.188	Round of 16
2	Iran	3	2	1	7	8	3	2.667	261	207	1.261	Round of 16
3	Tunisia	3	1	2	3	3	6	0.500	173	218	0.794	Round of 16
4	Libya	3	0	3	0	0	9	0.000	181	231	0.784	Round of 16

Source: FIVB

Date	Time		Score		Set 1	Set 2	Set 3	Set 4	Set 5	Total	Report
24 Aug	11:00	Iran	3–0	Libya	25–13	25–16	30–28			80–57	P2 Report
24 Aug	14:00	Egypt	3–0	Tunisia	25–20	25–21	25–15			75–56	P2 Report
25 Aug	11:00	Iran	3–0	Tunisia	25–13	25–12	25–16			75–41	P2 Report
25 Aug	14:00	Egypt	3–0	Libya	25–23	25–10	25–23			75–56	P2 Report
26 Aug	11:00	Iran	2–3	Egypt	19–25	22–25	25–19	27–25	13–15	106–109	P2 Report
26 Aug	14:00	Tunisia	3–0	Libya	26–24	25–23	25–21			76–68	P2 Report

=== Pool C ===
Pos	Team	Pld	W	L	Pts	SW	SL	SR	SPW	SPL	SPR	Qualification
1	Italy	3	3	0	9	9	2	4.500	270	203	1.330	Round of 16
2	Argentina	3	2	1	6	7	3	2.333	236	202	1.168	Round of 16
3	Puerto Rico	3	1	2	3	3	6	0.500	170	206	0.825	Round of 16
4	Cuba	3	0	3	0	1	9	0.111	185	250	0.740	Round of 16

Source: FIVB

Date	Time		Score		Set 1	Set 2	Set 3	Set 4	Set 5	Total	Report
24 Aug	14:00	Argentina	3–0	Puerto Rico	25–16	25–15	25–22			75–53	P2 Report
24 Aug	20:00	Italy	3–1	Cuba	25–23	24–26	25–15	25–12		99–76	P2 Report
25 Aug	14:00	Argentina	3–0	Cuba	25–22	25–15	25–15			75–52	P2 Report
25 Aug	20:00	Italy	3–0	Puerto Rico	25–13	25–17	25–11			75–41	P2 Report
26 Aug	14:00	Puerto Rico	3–0	Cuba	26–24	25–14	25–18			76–56	P2 Report
26 Aug	20:00	Italy	3–1	Argentina	21–25	25–20	25–22	25–19		96–86	P2 Report

=== Pool D ===
Pos	Team	Pld	W	L	Pts	SW	SL	SR	SPW	SPL	SPR	Qualification
1	Brazil	3	3	0	9	9	0	MAX	225	89	2.528	Round of 16
2	Belgium	3	2	1	6	6	3	2.000	199	116	1.716	Round of 16
3	Chile	3	1	2	3	3	6	0.500	156	150	1.040	Round of 16
4	Uzbekistan	3	0	3	0	0	9	0.000	0	225	0.000	Round of 16

Source: FIVB

Date	Time		Score		Set 1	Set 2	Set 3	Set 4	Set 5	Total	Report
24 Aug	17:00	Brazil	3–0	Chile	25–14	25–12	25–14			75–40	P2 Report
24 Aug		Belgium	3–0	Uzbekistan	25–0	25–0	25–0			75–0	Report
25 Aug	17:00	Belgium	3–0	Chile	25–13	25–17	25–11			75–41	P2 Report
25 Aug		Brazil	3–0	Uzbekistan	25–0	25–0	25–0			75–0	Report
26 Aug	17:00	Belgium	0–3	Brazil	18–25	19–25	12–25			49–75	P2 Report
26 Aug		Chile	3–0	Uzbekistan	25–0	25–0	25–0			75–0	Report

== Final round ==
All times are in local times, EEST (UTC+3), as listed by FIVB.

=== Main path bracket ===
Round of 16
27 August
Italy	3
Mexico	0
27 August
Iran	3
Chile	0
27 August
Brazil	3
Libya	0
27 August
Chinese Taipei	3
Puerto Rico	1
27 August
Argentina	3
Bulgaria	1
27 August
Egypt	3
Uzbekistan	0
27 August
Belgium	3
Tunisia	1
27 August
Spain	3
Cuba	2

Quarter-finals
29 Aug
Italy	3
Iran	2
29 Aug
Brazil	2
Chinese Taipei	3
29 Aug
Argentina	3
Egypt	2
29 Aug
Belgium	2
Spain	3

Semi-finals
30 Aug
Italy	3
Chinese Taipei	0
30 Aug
Argentina	3
Spain	2

Final
31 Aug
Italy	3
Argentina	2
3rd place match
31 Aug
Chinese Taipei	3
Spain	2

=== Round of 16 ===
Winners advanced to the quarter-finals to compete for the 1st to 8th places. Losers competed for the 9th to 16th places.

Date	Time	Venue		Score		Set 1	Set 2	Set 3	Set 4	Set 5	Total	Report
27 Aug	11:00	LSH	Italy	3–0	Mexico	25–22	25–16	25–21			75–59	P2 Report
27 Aug	11:00	HBH	Belgium	3–1	Tunisia	25–21	24–26	25–18	25–21		99–86	P2 Report
27 Aug	14:00	HBH	Brazil	3–0	Libya	25–20	25–10	25–19			75–49	P2 Report
27 Aug	14:00	LSH	Chinese Taipei	3–1	Puerto Rico	21–25	25–9	25–18	25–16		96–68	P2 Report
27 Aug	17:00	LSH	Argentina	3–1	Bulgaria	25–14	25–17	15–25	25–23		90–79	P2 Report
27 Aug		HBH	Egypt	3–0	Uzbekistan	25–0	25–0	25–0			75–0	Report
27 Aug	17:00	HBH	Iran	3–0	Chile	25–14	25–16	25–12			75–42	P2 Report
27 Aug	20:00	LSH	Spain	3–2	Cuba	26–24	19–25	25–22	21–25	15–10	106–106	P2 Report

=== 9th–16th places ===
13th place match
Chile	1
Tunisia	3
15th place match
Uzbekistan	0
Puerto Rico	3

13th–16th semi-finals
Chile	3
Uzbekistan	0
Tunisia	3
Puerto Rico	1

9th–16th quarter-finals
Mexico	3
Chile	0
Bulgaria	3
Uzbekistan	0
Tunisia	1
Cuba	3
Libya	3
Puerto Rico	2

9th–12th semi-finals
Mexico	0
Bulgaria	3
Cuba	3
Libya	0

9th place match
Bulgaria	3
Cuba	0
11th place match
Mexico	1
Libya	3

==== 9th–16th quarter-finals ====
The 9th to 16th quarter-finals took place at the Hristo Botev Hall.

Date	Time		Score		Set 1	Set 2	Set 3	Set 4	Set 5	Total	Report
29 Aug	11:00	Mexico	3–0	Chile	25–22	25–22	25–20			75–64	P2 Report
29 Aug		Bulgaria	3–0	Uzbekistan	25–0	25–0	25–0			75–0	Report
29 Aug	14:00	Tunisia	1–3	Cuba	25–23	22–25	14–25	21–25		82–98	P2 Report
29 Aug	17:00	Libya	3–2	Puerto Rico	25–22	21–25	14–25	25–20	15–13	100–105	P2 Report

==== 13th–16th semi-finals ====
The 13th–16th semi-finals took place at the Hristo Botev Hall.

Date	Time		Score		Set 1	Set 2	Set 3	Set 4	Set 5	Total	Report
30 Aug	11:00	Chile	3–0	Uzbekistan	25–0	25–0	25–0			75–0	Report
30 Aug	14:00	Tunisia	3–1	Puerto Rico	19–25	25–12	27–25	25–20		96–82	P2 Report

==== 9th–12th semi-finals ====
The 9th–12th semi-finals took place at the Levski Sofia Sports Hall.

Date	Time		Score		Set 1	Set 2	Set 3	Set 4	Set 5	Total	Report
30 Aug	11:00	Cuba	3–0	Libya	25–23	25–19	25–19			75–61	P2 Report
30 Aug	14:00	Mexico	0–3	Bulgaria	24–26	18–25	16–25			58–76	P2 Report

==== 15th place match ====
Date	Time		Score		Set 1	Set 2	Set 3	Set 4	Set 5	Total	Report
31 Aug		Uzbekistan	0–3	Puerto Rico	0–25	0–25	0–25			0–75	Report

==== 13th place match ====
Date	Time	Venue		Score		Set 1	Set 2	Set 3	Set 4	Set 5	Total	Report
31 Aug	10:00	HBH	Chile	1–3	Tunisia	18–25	25–20	19–25	21–25		83–95	P2 Report

==== 11th place match ====
Date	Time	Venue		Score		Set 1	Set 2	Set 3	Set 4	Set 5	Total	Report
31 Aug	13:00	HBH	Mexico	1–3	Libya	27–25	23–25	16–25	17–25		83–100	P2 Report

==== 9th place match ====
Date	Time	Venue		Score		Set 1	Set 2	Set 3	Set 4	Set 5	Total	Report
31 Aug	11:00	LSH	Bulgaria	3–0	Cuba	25–23	25–22	25–18			75–63	P2 Report

=== Final eight ===
5th place match
Iran	3
Belgium	2
7th place match
Brazil	1
Egypt	3

5th–8th semi-finals
Iran	3
Brazil	0
Egypt	1
Belgium	3

Quarter-finals
Italy	3
Iran	2
Brazil	2
Chinese Taipei	3
Argentina	3
Egypt	2
Belgium	2
Spain	3

Semi-finals
Italy	3
Chinese Taipei	0
Argentina	3
Spain	2

Final
Italy	3
Argentina	2
3rd place match
Chinese Taipei	3
Spain	2

==== Quarter-finals ====
The quarter-finals took place at the Levski Sofia Sports Hall.

Date	Time		Score		Set 1	Set 2	Set 3	Set 4	Set 5	Total	Report
29 Aug	11:00	Italy	3–2	Iran	20–25	25–18	21–25	27–25	15–9	108–102	P2 Report
29 Aug	14:00	Argentina	3–2	Egypt	25–23	22–25	25–16	21–25	15–9	108–98	P2 Report
29 Aug	17:00	Belgium	2–3	Spain	25–22	11–25	25–27	25–20	15–17	101–111	P2 Report
29 Aug	20:00	Brazil	2–3	Chinese Taipei	26–24	21–25	23–25	25–22	13–15	108–111	P2 Report

==== 5th–8th semi-finals ====
The 5th–8th semi-finals took place at the Hristo Botev Hall.

Date	Time		Score		Set 1	Set 2	Set 3	Set 4	Set 5	Total	Report
30 Aug	11:00	Iran	3–0	Brazil	25–9	29–27	25–15			79–51	P2 Report
30 Aug	17:00	Egypt	1–3	Belgium	25–22	19–25	19–25	14–25		77–97	P2 Report

==== Semi-finals ====
The semi-finals took place at the Levski Sofia Sports Hall.

Date	Time		Score		Set 1	Set 2	Set 3	Set 4	Set 5	Total	Report
30 Aug	17:00	Italy	3–0	Chinese Taipei	25–18	26–24	25–18			76–60	P2 Report
30 Aug	20:00	Argentina	3–2	Spain	25–21	17–25	33–35	25–18	15–10	115–109	P2 Report

==== 7th place match ====
Date	Time	Venue		Score		Set 1	Set 2	Set 3	Set 4	Set 5	Total	Report
31 Aug	16:00	HBH	Brazil	1–3	Egypt	25–19	19–25	32–34	23–25		99–103	P2 Report

==== 5th place match ====
Date	Time	Venue		Score		Set 1	Set 2	Set 3	Set 4	Set 5	Total	Report
31 Aug	14:00	LSH	Iran	3–2	Belgium	21–25	23–25	25–17	25–21	15–9	109–97	P2 Report

==== 3rd place match ====
Date	Time	Venue		Score		Set 1	Set 2	Set 3	Set 4	Set 5	Total	Report
31 Aug	17:00	LSH	Chinese Taipei	3–2	Spain	25–17	16–25	25–23	21–25	15–12	102–102	P2 Report

==== Final ====
Date	Time	Venue		Score		Set 1	Set 2	Set 3	Set 4	Set 5	Total	Report
31 Aug	20:00	LSH	Italy	3–2	Argentina	23–25	17–25	25–22	33–31	15–9	113–112	P2 Report

== Final standing ==
Rank	Team
1st place, gold medalist(s)	Italy
2nd place, silver medalist(s)	Argentina
3rd place, bronze medalist(s)	Chinese Taipei
4	Spain
5	Iran
6	Belgium
7	Egypt
8	Brazil
9	Bulgaria
10	Cuba
11	Libya
12	Mexico
13	Tunisia
14	Chile
15	Puerto Rico
16	Uzbekistan

2024 Boys' U17 World champions

Italy
1st title

12–boy roster
1 Gabriele Spina, 2 Pietro Valgiovio, 4 Gioele Costa, 8 Pietro Carrera, 9 Federico Argano, 11 Vittorio Bonandrini, 13 Manuel Zlatanov (c), 14 Francesco Destro, 15 Francesco Crosato, 16 Lorenzo Basso (L), 18 Jacopo Tosti, 24 Martino Bigozzi
Head coach: Luca Leoni

== Awards ==
The following individual awards were presented at the end of the tournament.

- Most valuable player (MVP)
  Manuel Zlatanov (ITA)
- Best setter
  Pietro Valgiovio (ITA)
- Best outside spikers
  Manuel Zlatanov (ITA)
  Huang Pin-yen (TPE)
- Best middle blockers
  Iván Pavón (ARG)
  Martino Bigozzi (ITA)
- Best opposite spiker
  Federico Argano (ITA)
- Best libero
  Valentín Yapura (ARG)

== Statistics leaders ==
Best Scorers
Rank	Player	Attacks	Blocks	Serves	Total
1	(Chinese Taipei) Huang Pin-yen	166	11	8	185
2	(Spain) César Irache	135	9	2	146
3	(Spain) Rafel Tugores	116	13	9	138
4	(Libya) Muezbillah Saleh Balnnour	112	9	10	131
5	(Italy) Manuel Zlatanov	104	12	13	129

Best Attackers
Rank	Player	Spikes	Faults	Shots	%	Total
1	(Chinese Taipei) Huang Pin-yen	166	75	140	43.57	381
2	(Spain) César Irache	135	71	135	39.59	341
3	(Spain) Rafel Tugores	116	27	101	47.54	244
4	(Libya) Muezbillah Saleh Balnnour	112	44	91	45.34	247
5	(Italy) Federico Argano	104	38	106	41.94	248
5	(Italy) Manuel Zlatanov	104	26	81	49.29	211

Best Blockers
Rank	Player	Blocks	Faults	Rebounds	Avg	Total
1	(Egypt) Ahmed Abo Gabal	26	33	29	4.33	88
2	(Spain) José Manuel Pastor	23	21	40	3.29	84
3	(Argentina) Iván Pavon	20	33	26	2.86	79
3	(Argentina) Álvaro Ferrer Bessone	20	22	33	2.86	75
5	(Argentina) Henry Sinner	18	24	11	2.57	53
5	(Bulgaria) Nikolay Mihovski	18	20	21	3.00	59

Best Servers
Rank	Player	Aces	Faults	Hits	Avg	Total
1	(Italy) Manuel Zlatanov	13	20	50	1.86	83
2	(Iran) Abdollahifar Kamyab	11	3	72	1.57	86
2	(Iran) Raouf Khoshhaldashliboroun	11	18	55	1.57	84
2	(Egypt) Ahmed Abo Gabal	11	17	47	1.83	75
5	(Libya) Muezbillah Saleh Balnnour	10	10	74	1.43	94

Best Setters
Rank	Player	Running	Faults	Still	Avg	Total
1	(Iran) Shantia Behnejad	46	6	371	6.57	423
2	(Egypt) Mohamed Ali	25	9	375	4.17	409
3	(Tunisia) Yassin Ridane	17	15	593	2.43	625
4	(Iran) Amirreza Mashhadbankouchaksaraei	13	3	163	1.86	179
4	(Libya) Musab Hamid Nasir	13	1	99	1.86	113

Best Diggers
Rank	Player	Digs	Faults	Receptions	Avg	Total
1	(Spain) Alex Menekbi	102	16	31	14.57	149
2	(Chinese Taipei) Huang Wen-yu	99	18	39	14.14	156
3	(Argentina) Valentín Yapura	86	12	42	12.29	140
4	(Argentina) Nehuén D'aversa	65	12	13	9.29	90
5	(Bulgaria) Dimitar Dobrev	64	8	39	10.67	111

Best Receivers
Rank	Player	Excellents	Faults	Serve	%	Total
1	(Tunisia) Yahia Ben Hassine	52	12	135	26.13	199
2	(Iran) Masoud Eimery	38	4	101	26.57	143
3	(Brazil) Bruno Marques	32	4	91	25.20	127
4	(Chile) Diego González	31	9	71	27.93	111
5	(Egypt) Ahmed Hamza	27	6	123	17.31	156
5	(Tunisia) Omar Hfaiedh	27	10	108	18.62	145

== See also ==
- 2024 FIVB Volleyball Girls' U17 World Championship
