= FIVB Volleyball Boys' U17 World Championship =

- Most recent season or competition: 2026 FIVB Volleyball Boys' U17 World Championship
- Sport: Volleyball
- Founded: 2022; 4 years ago
- First season: 2024
- No. of teams: 20
- Continent: International (FIVB)
- Most recent champion: Iran (1st title)
- Most titles: Iran; Italy (1 title each)

The FIVB Volleyball Boys' U17 World Championship is the biennial international youth volleyball championship contested by the men's national teams under the age of 17 of the members associations of the Fédération Internationale de Volleyball (FIVB), the sport's global governing body.

The FIVB U17 World Championship for both genders was proposed by the FIVB Volleyball Council and unanimously approved by the FIVB Board of Administration during its meeting held in March 2022.

The first edition was staged in 2024 in Sofia, Bulgaria and was attended by 16 teams with plans to be expanded in subsequent editions. In April 2025, FIVB announced that the structure of the U17 events would be adapted to that of the U19 and U21 World Championships, featuring 24 teams, the same qualification processes and competition formats.

A corresponding tournament for female players is the FIVB Volleyball Girls' U17 World Championship.

== Results summary ==
Year	Host	Final			3rd place match			Teams
Year	Host	Champions	Score	Runners-up	3rd place	Score	4th place	Teams
2024; Details	(Bulgaria); Sofia	Italy	3–2	Argentina	Chinese Taipei	3–2	Spain	16
2026; Details	(Qatar); Doha	Iran	3–1	France	Brazil	3–1	Argentina	20

== Medal table ==
Rank	Nation	Gold	Silver	Bronze	Total
1	Iran	1	0	0	1
1	Italy	1	0	0	1
3	Argentina	0	1	0	1
3	France	0	1	0	1
5	Brazil	0	0	1	1
5	Chinese Taipei	0	0	1	1
Totals (6 entries)		2	2	2	6

== Appearance ==
Legend

- 1st – Champions
- 2nd – Runners-up
- 3rd – Third place
- 4th – Fourth place
- • – Did not enter / Did not qualify
- – Hosts
- Q – Qualified for forthcoming tournament
- WD – Qualified, but withdrew

Team	(Bulgaria); 2024 (16)	(Qatar); 2026 (20)	Total
Algeria	•	17th	1
Argentina	2nd	4th	2
Belgium	6th	•	1
Brazil	8th	3rd	2
Bulgaria	9th	9th	2
Chile	14th	•	1
Czech Republic	•	WD	0
Chinese Taipei	3rd	15th	2
Cuba	10th	19th	2
Egypt	7th	12th	2
France	•	2nd	1
India	•	14th	1
Iran	5th	1st	2
Italy	1st	10th	2
Japan	•	WD	0
Libya	11th	•	1
Mexico	12th	18th	2
Pakistan	•	5th	1
Poland	•	6th	1
Puerto Rico	15th	WD	1
Qatar	•	20th	1
Romania	•	7th	1
Spain	4th	16th	2
Tunisia	13th	11th	2
Turkey	•	13th	1
United States	•	WD	0
Uzbekistan	16th	•	1
Venezuela	•	8th	1

== See also ==
- FIVB Volleyball Girls' U17 World Championship
- FIVB Volleyball Men's U21 World Championship
- FIVB Volleyball Boys' U19 World Championship
