= 2021–22 Turkish Women's Volleyball League =

- League: Turkish Women's Volleyball League
- Sport: Volleyball
- Teams: 14
- Season champions: VakıfBank Spor Kulübü
- Finals champions: VakıfBank Spor Kulübü
- Runners-up: Fenerbahçe Opet
- Finals MVP: Zehra Güneş (TUR)

Turkish Women's Volleyball League seasons
- 2020–21 2022–23

The 2021–22 Turkish Women's Volleyball League is the 39th volleyball tournament year and the top-level women's volleyball tournament of the newly branded and reorganized Turkish Women's Volleyball League. The winner, runner-up and third of Turkish Women's Volleyball League will play in CEV Champions League league round and 4th place will play in CEV Cup main phase. The 5th place will play in CEV Challenge Cup main phase while the last 2 teams in the Turkish Women's Volleyball League will be relegated to the Second League. The last season's champion is VakıfBank, who have won the league 12 times.

== Personnel ==
2021–22 Turkish Women's Volleyball League Personnel
Club	Head coach	Captain	City, Prefecture	Colors	Main Sponsor
VakıfBank Spor Kulübü	(Italy) Giovanni Guidetti	(Turkey) Kübra Çalışkan	Istanbul		VakıfBank
Fenerbahçe Opet	(Serbia) Zoran Terzić	(Turkey) Eda Erdem Dündar	Istanbul		Opet, Corendon Airlines, Bilcee, Fenerbahçe
Eczacıbaşı Dynavit	(Turkey) Ferhat Akbaş	(Serbia) Tijana Boskovic	Istanbul		Eczacıbaşı
Türk Hava Yolları Spor Kulübü	(Italy) Marcello Abbondanza	(Turkey) Şeyma Ercan	Istanbul		Turkish Airlines
Nilüfer Belediyespor	(Turkey) Dehri Can Dehrioğlu	(Ukraine) Oleksandra Bytsenko	Bursa		Nilüfer Belediye
Aydın Büyükşehir Belediyespor	(Turkey) Alper Hamurcu	(Turkey) Güldeniz Önal	Aydın		T.C. Aydın Büyükşehir Belediyesi
Galatasaray HDI Sigorta	(Turkey) Ataman Güneyligil	(Turkey) Gizem Güreşen	Istanbul		Galatasaray
Yeşilyurt Spor Kulübü	(Turkey) Burçin Kundak	(Turkey) Pınar Atasever	Istanbul		Sistem9
PTT Spor Kulübü	(Turkey) Mehmet Bedestenlioğlu	(Bulgaria) Emiliya Dimitrova	Ankara		PTT
Karayolları Spor Kulübü	(Turkey) Hüseyin Doğanyüz	(Turkey) Tuğçe Ceyhan	Ankara		Karayolları
Bolu Belediyespor	(Turkey) Salih Yergin	(Czech Republic) Aneta Havlíčková	Bolu		Bolu Bld
Kuzeyboru Gençlik ve Spor Kulübü	(Turkey) Suphi Doğancı	(Turkey) Arelya Karasoy	Aksaray		Kuzeyboru
Sarıyer Belediyesi Spor Kulübü	(Turkey) Gökhan Rahman Çokşen	(Turkey) Begüm Hepkaptan	Istanbul		Sarıyer Belediyesi
Mert Grup Sigorta	(Turkey) Nahit Cantürk	(Turkey) Merve Ikbal Albayrak	Ankara		Sigorta shop

== Foreign players ==
The number of foreign players is more than one per club but still not more than 3 in the field.

2021–22 Turkish Women's Volleyball League
Team	Player 1	Player 2	Player 3	Player 4	Player 5
VakıfBank Spor Kulübü	(Brazil) Gabriela Guimarães	(Sweden) Isabelle Haak	(United States) Michelle Bartsch-Hackley	(United States) Chiaka Ogbogu	—N/a
Fenerbahçe Opet	(Russia) Anna Lazareva	(Russia) Arina Fedorovtseva	(Serbia) Mina Popović	(Brazil) Ana Cristina de Souza	—N/a
Eczacıbaşı Dynavit	(Serbia) Tijana Bošković	(Serbia) Maja Ognjenović	(United States) McKenzie Adams	(Belgium) Laura Heyrman	(United States) Jordan Thompson
Türk Hava Yolları Spor Kulübü	(United States) Lauren Carlini	(United States) Madison Kingdon	(Canada) Kiera Van Ryk	(Bulgaria) Dobriana Rabadžieva	(United States) TeTori Dixon
Nilüfer Belediyespor	(Canada) Emily Maglio	(Ukraine) Oleksandra Bytsenko	(Belgium) Dominika Sobolska-Tarasova	—N/a	—N/a
Aydın Büyükşehir Belediyespor	(Hungary) Gréta Szakmáry	(Italy) Anna Nicoletti	—N/a	—N/a	—N/a
Galatasaray HDI Sigorta	(Greece) Anthí Vasilantonáki	(Romania) Alexia Căruțașu	(Slovenia) Saša Planinšec	—N/a	—N/a
Yeşilyurt Spor Kulübü	(Belgium) Dominika Strumilo	(Canada) Kelsey Veltman	—N/a	—N/a	—N/a
PTT Spor Kulübü	(Belgium) Hélène Rousseaux	(Bulgaria) Emiliya Dimitrova	(Brazil) Amanda Francisco	—N/a	—N/a
Karayolları Spor Kulübü	(Ukraine) Yuliya Gerasymova	(Croatia) Matea Ikić	—N/a	—N/a	—N/a
Bolu Belediyespor	(Czech Republic) Aneta Havlíčková	(Cuba) Rosir Calderon	(Azerbaijan) Olena Kharchenko	—N/a	—N/a
Kuzeyboru Gençlik ve Spor Kulübü	(Ukraine) Olesia Rykhliuk	(United States) Annie Mitchem	—N/a	—N/a	—N/a
Sarıyer Belediyesi Spor Kulübü	(United States) Naya Crittenden	(Thailand) Ajcharaporn Kongyot	(Serbia) Aleksandra Crnčević	(Thailand) Chatchu-on Moksri	—N/a
Mert Grup Sigorta	(Dominican Republic) Gaila González	(Bulgaria) Miroslava Paskova	(Russia) Olga Biryukova	—N/a	—N/a

== Transfer players ==
Player	Moving from	Moving to
(United States) Chiaka Ogbogu	(Turkey) Eczacıbaşı VitrA	(Turkey) VakıfBank S.K.
(Turkey) Aylin Sarıoğlu	(Turkey) Fenerbahçe	(Turkey) VakıfBank S.K.
(Turkey) Meryem Boz	(Turkey) Aydın Büyükşehir	(Turkey) VakıfBank S.K.
(Turkey) Buket Gülübay	(Turkey) Sistem9 Yeşilyurt	(Turkey) VakıfBank S.K.
(Serbia) Milena Rašić	(Turkey) VakıfBank S.K.	—N/a
(Serbia) Maja Ognjenović	(Turkey) VakıfBank S.K.	(Turkey) Eczacıbaşı VitrA
(Turkey) Buket Gülübay	(Turkey) Sistem9 Yeşilyurt	(Turkey) VakıfBank S.K.
(Russia) Anna Lazareva	(South Korea) Hwaseong IBK Altos	(Turkey) Fenerbahçe
(Turkey) Gizem Örge	(Turkey) VakıfBank S.K.	(Turkey) Fenerbahçe
(Turkey) Meliha İsmailoğlu	(Turkey) VakıfBank S.K.	(Turkey) Fenerbahçe
(Turkey) Tutku Burcu Yüzgenç	(Turkey) Karayolları	(Turkey) Fenerbahçe
(Turkey) Buse Ünal	(Turkey) Nilüfer Belediyespor	(Turkey) Fenerbahçe
(Russia) Arina Fedorovtseva	(Russia) Dinamo-Ak Bars	(Turkey) Fenerbahçe
(Brazil) Ana Cristina Souza	(Brazil) Sesc/Flamengo	(Turkey) Fenerbahçe
(Serbia) Mina Popović	(Italy) Scandicci	(Turkey) Fenerbahçe
(Turkey) Pınar Eren	(Turkey) Aydın Büyükşehir	(Turkey) Fenerbahçe
(Turkey) Cansu Aydınoğulları	(Turkey) PTT	(Turkey) Sigorta Shop KB
(Turkey) Cemre Janset Erkul	(Turkey) Aydın Büyükşehir	(Turkey) THY
(Cuba) Lianma Flores	(Turkey) Karşıyaka SK	(Turkey) Kuzeyboru
(Turkey) Melis Yılmaz	(Turkey) Fenerbahçe	(Turkey) Aydın Büyükşehir
(Turkey) Sude Naz Uzun	(Turkey) Fenerbahçe	(Turkey) Nilüfer Belediyespor
(Turkey) Hilal Kocakara	(Turkey) Fenerbahçe	(Turkey) Nilüfer Belediyespor
(Turkey) Fulden Ural	(Turkey) Nilüfer Belediyespor	(Turkey) Kuzeyboru
(Turkey) Ebrar Karakurt	(Turkey) THY	(Italy) Igor Gorgonzola Novara
(United States) Katherine Bell	(Turkey) Bolu Bld	(South Korea) Incheon Heungkuk Life Pink Spiders
(Turkey) Ergül Avcı Eroğlu	(Turkey) Galatasaray HDI Sigorta	(Turkey) Aydın Büyükşehir
(Puerto Rico) Daly Santana	(Turkey) THY	(Puerto Rico) Pinkin de Corozal
(Turkey) İrem Çor	(Turkey) Sarıyer Belediyesi	(Turkey) THY
(Canada) Kiera Van Ryk	(Poland) Developres SkyRes Rzeszów	(Turkey) THY
(Turkey) Alexia Ioana Căruțașu	(Turkey) Sistem9 Yeşilyurt	(Turkey) Galatasaray HDI Sigorta
(Greece) Anthi Vasilantonaki	(Turkey) Aydın Büyükşehir	(Turkey) Galatasaray HDI Sigorta
(Turkey) Zeynep Sude Demirel	(Turkey) Sistem9 Yeşilyurt	(Turkey) Galatasaray HDI Sigorta
(Serbia) Bianka Buša	(Turkey) Fenerbahçe	(Russia) Lokomotiv Kaliningrad
(Turkey) (Cuba) Melissa Vargas	(Turkey) Fenerbahçe	(China) Tianjin
(Turkey) Ada Germen	(Turkey) THY	(Turkey) Sarıyer Belediyesi
(Turkey) İlayda Uçak	(Turkey) Sistem9 Yeşilyurt	(Turkey) PTT
(Turkey) Ecem Alici	(Turkey) Aydın Büyükşehir	(Turkey) Sarıyer Belediyesi
(Turkey) Bihter Dumanoğlu	(Turkey) Sistem9 Yeşilyurt	(Turkey) Galatasaray HDI Sigorta
(Turkey) Derya Cebecioğlu	(Turkey) Sistem9 Yeşilyurt	(Turkey) VakıfBank S.K.
(Turkey) Buket Gülübay	(Turkey) Sistem9 Yeşilyurt	(Turkey) VakıfBank S.K.
(Turkey) Su Zent]	(Turkey) PTT	(Turkey) Galatasaray HDI Sigorta
(United States) McKenzie Adams	(Italy) Imoco Volley Conegliano	(Turkey) Eczacıbaşı VitrA
(Belgium) Laura Heyrman	(Italy) Saugella Team Monza	(Turkey) Eczacıbaşı VitrA
(Turkey) Hande Korkut	(Turkey) Aydın Büyükşehir	(Turkey) Kuzeyboru
(Turkey) Tuna Aybüke Cetinay	(Turkey) Sistem9 Yeşilyurt	(Turkey) Sarıyer Belediyesi
(Turkey) Lila Şengün	(Turkey) Fenerbahçe	(Turkey) Sarıyer Belediyesi
(Turkey) Ceren Nur Domaç	(Turkey) Kuzeyboru	(Turkey) PTT
(Turkey) Merve Nezir	(Turkey) Nilüfer Belediyespor	(Turkey) Karayolları
(Turkey) Gamze Alikaya	(Turkey) Eczacıbaşı VitrA	(Turkey) Galatasaray HDI Sigorta
(Turkey) Merve Tanıl	(Turkey) Nilüfer Belediyespor	(Turkey) Sarıyer Belediyesi
(Turkey) Begüm Hepkaptan	(Turkey) Merinos SK	(Turkey) Sarıyer Belediyesi
(Turkey) Yasemin Şahin Yildirim	(Turkey) Nilüfer Belediyespor	(Turkey) Kuzeyboru
(Turkey) Hazal Selin Arifoğlu	(Turkey) Galatasaray HDI Sigorta	(Turkey) Kuzeyboru
(Turkey) Gülce Güçtekin	(Turkey) Fenerbahçe	(Turkey) Sarıyer Belediyesi
(Turkey) Çağla Akın	(Turkey) Galatasaray HDI Sigorta	(Turkey) Nilüfer Belediyespor
(Slovenia) Lana Ščuka	(Turkey) Sistem9 Yeşilyurt	(Turkey) İlbank
(Turkey) Sinem Bayazit	(Turkey) Sarıyer Belediyesi	(Turkey) İlbank
(Belgium) Hélène Rousseaux	(South Korea) Suwon Hyundai E&C Hillstate	(Turkey) PTT
(Turkey) Gizem Misra Aşçı	(Turkey) Sarıyer Belediyesi	(Turkey) Karayolları
(Turkey) Yasemin Özel	(Turkey) İlbank	(Turkey) Karayolları
(Turkey) Şeyma Nur Akbulut	(Turkey) Sarıyer Belediyesi	(Turkey) İlbank
(Turkey) Duygu Çetav	(Turkey) Kuzeyboru	(Turkey) İlbank
(Turkey) Sila Çalışkan	(Hungary) Vasas Óbuda	(Turkey) PTT
(Turkey) Simay Gazi	(Turkey) Nevşehir Bld.	(Turkey) Kuzeyboru
(Turkey) Elif Boran	(Turkey) Çukurova Belediyespor	(Turkey) Kuzeyboru
(Turkey) Duygu Çetav	(Turkey) Kuzeyboru	(Turkey) Kuzeyboru
(Turkey) Ezgi Akyaldiz	(Turkey) Karayolları	(Turkey) Kuzeyboru
(Turkey) Işıl Öz	(Turkey) Bolu Bld	(Turkey) Kuzeyboru
(Turkey) Çağla Erdem Rızvanoğlu	(Turkey) Sarıyer Belediyesi	(Turkey) PTT
(Turkey) Ece Emrullah	(Turkey) Galatasaray HDI Sigorta	(United States) Texas A&M University–Corpus Christi
(Turkey) Defne Tokol	(Turkey) Istanbul BBSK	(Turkey) Sigorta Shop KB
(Greece) Styliani Christodoulou	(Turkey) Aydın Büyükşehir	(Greece) Olympiacos
(United States) Naya Crittenden	(Germany) Dresdner SC	(Turkey) Sarıyer Belediyesi
(Turkey) Merve Nur Öztürk	(Turkey) Çanakkale Belediyespor	(Turkey) Aydın Büyükşehir
(Turkey) Fatma Beyaz	(Turkey) Bolu Bld.	(Turkey) Galatasaray HDI Sigorta
(Italy) Anna Nicoletti	(Italy) Volley Millenium Brescia	(Turkey) Aydın Büyükşehir
(Turkey) Ece Kozdere	(Turkey) Karşıyaka SK	(Turkey) Nilüfer Belediyespor
(Hungary) Gréta Szakmáry	(Germany) Schweriner SC	(Turkey) Aydın Büyükşehir
(Thailand) Ajcharaporn Kongyot	(Thailand) Supreme	(Turkey) Sarıyer Belediyesi
(Turkey) Özge Nur Çetiner	(Turkey) THY	(Turkey) Sigorta Shop KB
(United States) Hayley Spelman	(Germany) Schweriner SC	(Turkey) Nilüfer Belediyespor
(Turkey) Yagmur Mislina Kılıç	(Turkey) PTT	(Turkey) Nilüfer Belediyespor
(Turkey) Peyman Yardımcı	(Turkey) Fenerbahçe	(United States) US.Miami
(Turkey) Kübra Kegan	(Turkey) Adam Voleybol	(Turkey) Karayolları
(Turkey) Aybüke Özdemir	(Turkey) Nilüfer Belediyespor	(Turkey) İlbank
(Turkey) Nursevil Aydınlar Gökbudak	(Turkey) THY	(Turkey) Çukurova Belediyespor
(Turkey) Sinem Barut	(Turkey) Kuzeyboru	(Turkey) Adam Voleybol
(Turkey) İrem Nilşat Kaya	(Turkey) Sistem9 Yeşilyurt	(Turkey) İstanbul BBSK
(Turkey) Ayçin Akyol	(Turkey) Kuzeyboru	(Turkey) İstanbul BBSK
(Turkey) Arzum Tezcan	(Turkey) Sigorta Shop KB	(Turkey) Karayolları
(Turkey) Gözde Yılmaz	(Turkey) VakıfBank S.K.	(Turkey) Karayolları
(Bulgaria) Dobriana Rabadžieva	(Brazil) Sesi Bauru	(Turkey) THY
(Turkey) Merve Ikbal Albayrak	(Turkey) Sarıyer Belediyesi	(Turkey) Sigorta Shop KB
(Turkey) Dilara Yeşil	(Turkey) Kuzeyboru	(Turkey) Merinos SK
(Turkey) Gizem Çerağ Düzeltir	(Turkey) Sarıyer Belediyesi	(Turkey) Sigorta Shop KB
(Thailand) Chatchu-on Moksri	(Thailand) Nakhon Ratchasima QminC	(Turkey) Sarıyer Belediyesi

== League table ==
Qualified for the Play-offs (1-4)
Qualified for the Play-offs (5-8)
Qualified for the Play-outs

Pos	Team	Pld	W	L	Pts	SW	SL	SR	SPW	SPL	SPR	Qualification
1	VakıfBank Spor Kulübü	26	24	2	71	73	14	5.214	2138	1665	1.284	Play-offs (1-4)
2	Eczacıbaşı Dynavit	26	22	4	66	70	20	3.500	2132	1779	1.198	Play-offs (1-4)
3	Fenerbahçe Opet	26	22	4	66	71	22	3.227	2214	1776	1.247	Play-offs (1-4)
4	Türk Hava Yolları Spor Kulübü	26	21	5	60	67	26	2.577	2173	1837	1.183	Play-offs (1-4)
5	Galatasaray HDI Sigorta	26	17	9	51	58	37	1.568	2127	1951	1.090	Play-offs (5-8)
6	PTT Spor Kulübü	26	17	9	47	55	42	1.310	2178	2109	1.033	Play-offs (5-8)
7	Aydın Büyükşehir Belediyespor	26	12	14	37	43	47	0.915	1974	1982	0.996	Play-offs (5-8)
8	Kuzeyboru Gençlik veSpor Kulübü	26	11	15	38	48	51	0.941	2105	2095	1.005	Play-offs (5-8)
9	Mert Grup Sigorta	26	10	16	29	41	56	0.732	2068	2159	0.958	
10	Bolu Belediyespor	26	7	19	22	32	64	0.500	1935	2219	0.872	
11	Sarıyer Belediyesi Spor Kulübü	26	7	19	21	37	67	0.552	2082	2320	0.897	
12	Nilüfer Belediyespor	26	6	20	17	25	68	0.368	1845	2200	0.839	
13	Karayolları Spor Kulübü	26	5	21	16	29	71	0.408	2010	2295	0.876	Play-outs
14	Yeşilyurt Spor Kulübü	26	1	25	5	12	76	0.158	1527	2121	0.720	Play-outs

Source: Misli.com Sultanlar Lig Etabı / Update: 5 April 2022

== Play-offs ==
=== Play-offs 1-4 ===
Play-offs 1-4
1	VakıfBank Spor Kulübü	2
4	Türk Hava Yolları Spor Kulübü	0
2	Eczacıbaşı Dynavit	0
3	Fenerbahçe Opet	2

Finals
1	VakıfBank Spor Kulübü	3
3	Fenerbahçe Opet	2
Play-offs 3-4
4	Türk Hava Yolları Spor Kulübü	0
2	Eczacıbaşı Dynavit	2

==== Play-offs 1-4 ====
Team 1	Series	Team 2	Game 1	Game 2	Game 3
VakıfBank Spor Kulübü	2–0	Türk Hava Yolları Spor Kulübü	3–2	3–0	–
Eczacıbaşı Dynavit	0–2	Fenerbahçe Opet	1–3	0–3	–

==== Play-offs 3-4 ====
Team 1	Series	Team 2	Game 1	Game 2	Game 3
Eczacıbaşı Dynavit	2–0	Türk Hava Yolları Spor Kulübü	3–0	3–0	–

==== Finals ====
Team 1	Series	Team 2	Game 1	Game 2	Game 3	Game 4	Game 5
VakıfBank Spor Kulübü	3–2	Fenerbahçe Opet	1–3	3–1	1–3	3–2	3–0

=== Play-offs 5-8 ===
Play-offs 5-8
5	Galatasaray HDI Sigorta	2
8	Kuzeyboru	0
6	PTT Spor Kulübü	2
7	Aydın Büyükşehir Belediyespor	0

Play-offs 5-6
5	Galatasaray HDI Sigorta	2
6	PTT Spor Kulübü	0
Play-offs 7-8
8	Kuzeyboru Gençlik ve Spor Kulübü	1
7	Aydın Büyükşehir Belediyespor	2

==== Play-offs 5-8 ====
Team 1	Series	Team 2	Game 1	Game 2	Game 3
Galatasaray HDI Sigorta	2–0	Kuzeyboru Spor Kulübü	3–1	3–2	–
PTT Spor Kulübü	2–0	Aydın Büyükşehir Belediyespor	3–1	3–1	–

==== Play-offs 7-8 ====
Team 1	Series	Team 2	Game 1	Game 2	Game 3
Aydın Büyükşehir Belediyespor	2–1	Kuzeyboru Gençlik ve Spor Kulübü	3–1	2–3	3–0

==== Play-offs 5-6 ====
Team 1	Series	Team 2	Game 1	Game 2	Game 3
Galatasaray HDI Sigorta	2–0	PTT Spor Kulübü	3–1	3–0	–

== See also ==
- 2021–22 Turkish Men's Volleyball League
