= 2020–21 Turkish Women's Volleyball League =

- League: Turkish Women's Volleyball League
- Sport: Volleyball
- Teams: 14
- Finals MVP: (Sweden) Isabelle Haak

Turkish Women's Volleyball League seasons
- 2018–19 2021–22

The 2020–21 Turkish Women's Volleyball League is the 39th volleyball tournament year and the top-level women's volleyball tournament of the newly branded and reorganized Turkish Women's Volleyball League. The winner, runner-up and third of Turkish Women's Volleyball League will play in CEV Champions League league round and 4th place will play in CEV Cup main phase. The 5th place will play in CEV Challenge Cup main phase while the last 2 teams in the Turkish Women's Volleyball League will be relegated to the Second League. The last season's champion is VakıfBank, who have won the league 12 times.

== Clubs ==
2020–21 Turkish Women's Volleyball League

=== Personnel ===
2021–22 Turkish Women's Volleyball League Personnel
| Club | Head coach | Captain | City, Prefecture | Colors | Main Sponsor |
|---|---|---|---|---|---|
| VakıfBank S.K. | (Italy) Giovanni Guidetti | (Turkey) Melis Gürkaynak | Istanbul | | VakıfBank |
| Fenerbahçe | (Serbia) Zoran Terzić | (Turkey) Eda Erdem Dündar | Istanbul | | Opet, Corendon Airlines, Bilcee, Fenerbahçe |
| Eczacıbaşı VitrA | (Turkey) Ferhat Akbaş | (Serbia) Tijana Boskovic | Istanbul | | Eczacıbaşı |
| THY | (Italy) Marcello Abbondanza | (Turkey) Şeyma Ercan | Istanbul | | Turkish Airlines |
| Nilüfer Belediyespor | (Turkey) Dehri Can Dehrioğlu | TBA | Bursa | | Nilüfer Belediye |
| Aydın Büyükşehir | (Turkey) Alper Hamurcu | TBA | Aydın | | T.C. Aydın Büyükşehir Belediyesi |
| Galatasaray HDI Sigorta | (Turkey) Ataman Güneyligil | TBA | Istanbul | | Galatasaray |
| Sistem9 Yeşilyurt | (Turkey) Mehmet Kamil Söz | TBA | Istanbul | | Sistem9 |
| PTT | (Turkey) Mehmet Bedestenlioğlu | TBA | Ankara | | PTT |
| Karayolları | (Turkey) Hüseyin Doğanyüz | TBA | Ankara | | Karayolları |
| Bolu Bld | (Turkey) Salih Yergin | (Turkey) Elif Uzun | Bolu | | Bolu Bld |
| Kuzeyboru | (Turkey) Suphi Doğancı | TBA | Aksaray | | Kuzeyboru |
| Sarıyer Belediyesi | (Turkey) Gökhan Rahman Çokşen | TBA | Istanbul | | Sarıyer Belediyesi |
| Sigorta Shop KB | (Turkey) Nahit Cantürk | TBA | Ankara | | Sigorta shop |

=== Foreign players ===
The number of foreign players is more than to one per club but still in the field not more than three.

2021–22 Turkish Women's Volleyball League
| Team | Player 1 | Player 2 | Player 3 | Player 4 | Player 5 |
|---|---|---|---|---|---|
| VakıfBank S.K. | (Brazil) Gabriela Guimarães | (Sweden) Isabelle Haak | (United States) Michelle Bartsch-Hackley | (United States) Chiaka Ogbogu | —N/a |
| Fenerbahçe | (Russia) Anna Lazareva | (Russia) Arina Fedorovtseva | (Serbia) Mina Popović | (Brazil) Ana Cristina Souza | —N/a |
| Eczacıbaşı VitrA | (Serbia) Tijana Bošković | (Serbia) Maja Ognjenović | (United States) McKenzie Adams | (Belgium) Laura Heyrman | (United States) Jordan Thompson |
| THY | (United States) Lauren Carlini | (United States) Madison Kingdon | (Canada) Kiera Van Ryk | (Bulgaria) Dobriana Rabadžieva | (United States) TeTori Dixon |
| Nilüfer Belediyespor | (Canada) Emily Maglio | (United States) Hayley Spelman | (Ukraine) Oleksandra Bytsenko | (Belgium) Dominika Sobolska-Tarasova | —N/a |
| Aydın Büyükşehir | (Hungary) Gréta Szakmáry | (Italy) Anna Nicoletti | —N/a | —N/a | —N/a |
| Galatasaray HDI Sigorta | (Greece) Anthi Vasilantonaki | (Romania) Alexia Ioana Căruțașu | (Slovenia) Saša Planinšec | —N/a | —N/a |
| Sistem9 Yeşilyurt | —N/a | —N/a | —N/a | —N/a | —N/a |
| PTT | (Belgium) Hélène Rousseaux | (Bulgaria) Emiliya Dimitrova | (Brazil) Amanda Francisco | —N/a | —N/a |
| Karayolları | (Switzerland) Yonca Bartu | (Ukraine) Yuliya Gerasymova | —N/a | —N/a | —N/a |
| Bolu Bld | (Czech Republic) Aneta Havlíčková | (Cuba) Rosir Calderon | (Azerbaijan) Olena Kharchenko | —N/a | —N/a |
| Kuzeyboru | (Ukraine) Olesia Rykhliuk | (Croatia) Matea Ikić | (United States) Annie Mitchem | (Cuba) Lianma Flores | —N/a |
| Sarıyer Belediyesi | (United States) Naya Crittenden | (Thailand) Ajcharaporn Kongyot | (Serbia) Aleksandra Crncević | —N/a | —N/a |
| Mert group Sigorta | (Dominican Republic) Gaila Gonzalez | (Bulgaria) Miroslava Paskova | (Russia) Olga Biryukova | —N/a | —N/a |

=== Transfer players ===
| Player | Moving from | Moving to |
|---|---|---|
| (United States) Chiaka Ogbogu | (Turkey) Eczacıbaşı VitrA | (Turkey) VakıfBank S.K. |
| (Turkey) Aylin Sarıoğlu | (Turkey) Fenerbahçe | (Turkey) VakıfBank S.K. |
| (Turkey) Meryem Boz | (Turkey) Aydın Büyükşehir | (Turkey) VakıfBank S.K. |
| (Turkey) Buket Gülübay | (Turkey) Sistem9 Yeşilyurt | (Turkey) VakıfBank S.K. |
| (Serbia) Milena Rašić | (Turkey) VakıfBank S.K. | —N/a |
| (Serbia) Maja Ognjenović | (Turkey) VakıfBank S.K. | (Turkey) Eczacıbaşı VitrA |
| (Turkey) Buket Gülübay | (Turkey) Sistem9 Yeşilyurt | (Turkey) VakıfBank S.K. |
| (Russia) Anna Lazareva | (South Korea) Hwaseong IBK Altos | (Turkey) Fenerbahçe |
| (Turkey) Gizem Örge | (Turkey) VakıfBank S.K. | (Turkey) Fenerbahçe |
| (Turkey) Meliha İsmailoğlu | (Turkey) VakıfBank S.K. | (Turkey) Fenerbahçe |
| (Turkey) Tutku Burcu Yüzgenç | (Turkey) Karayolları | (Turkey) Fenerbahçe |
| (Turkey) Buse Ünal | (Turkey) Nilüfer Belediyespor | (Turkey) Fenerbahçe |
| (Russia) Arina Fedorovtseva | (Russia) Dinamo-Ak Bars | (Turkey) Fenerbahçe |
| (Brazil) Ana Cristina Souza | (Brazil) Sesc/Flamengo | (Turkey) Fenerbahçe |
| (Serbia) Mina Popović | (Italy) Scandicci | (Turkey) Fenerbahçe |
| (Turkey) Pınar Eren | (Turkey) Aydın Büyükşehir | (Turkey) Fenerbahçe |
| (Turkey) Cansu Aydınoğulları | (Turkey) PTT | (Turkey) Sigorta Shop KB |
| (Turkey) Cemre Janset Erkul | (Turkey) Aydın Büyükşehir | (Turkey) THY |
| (Cuba) Lianma Flores | (Turkey) Karşıyaka SK | (Turkey) Kuzeyboru |
| (Turkey) Melis Yılmaz | (Turkey) Fenerbahçe | (Turkey) Aydın Büyükşehir |
| (Turkey) Sude Naz Uzun | (Turkey) Fenerbahçe | (Turkey) Nilüfer Belediyespor |
| (Turkey) Hilal Kocakara | (Turkey) Fenerbahçe | (Turkey) Nilüfer Belediyespor |
| (Turkey) Fulden Ural | (Turkey) Nilüfer Belediyespor | (Turkey) Kuzeyboru |
| (Turkey) Ebrar Karakurt | (Turkey) THY | (Italy) Igor Gorgonzola Novara |
| (United States) Katherine Bell | (Turkey) Bolu Bld | (South Korea) Incheon Heungkuk Life Pink Spiders |
| (Turkey) Ergül Avcı Eroğlu | (Turkey) Galatasaray HDI Sigorta | (Turkey) Aydın Büyükşehir |
| (Puerto Rico) Daly Santana | (Turkey) THY | (Puerto Rico) Pinkin de Corozal |
| (Turkey) İrem Çor | (Turkey) Sarıyer Belediyesi | (Turkey) THY |
| (Canada) Kiera Van Ryk | (Poland) Developres SkyRes Rzeszów | (Turkey) THY |
| (Turkey) Alexia Ioana Căruțașu | (Turkey) Sistem9 Yeşilyurt | (Turkey) Galatasaray HDI Sigorta |
| (Greece) Anthi Vasilantonaki | (Turkey) Aydın Büyükşehir | (Turkey) Galatasaray HDI Sigorta |
| (Turkey) Zeynep Sude Demirel | (Turkey) Sistem9 Yeşilyurt | (Turkey) Galatasaray HDI Sigorta |
| (Serbia) Bianka Buša | (Turkey) Fenerbahçe | (Russia) Lokomotiv Kaliningrad |
| (Turkey) Melissa Vargas | (Turkey) Fenerbahçe | (China) Tianjin |
| (Turkey) Ada Germen | (Turkey) THY | (Turkey) Sarıyer Belediyesi |
| (Turkey) İlayda Uçak | (Turkey) Sistem9 Yeşilyurt | (Turkey) PTT |
| (Turkey) Ecem Alici | (Turkey) Aydın Büyükşehir | (Turkey) Sarıyer Belediyesi |
| (Turkey) Bihter Dumanoğlu | (Turkey) Sistem9 Yeşilyurt | (Turkey) Galatasaray HDI Sigorta |
| (Turkey) Derya Cebecioğlu | (Turkey) Sistem9 Yeşilyurt | (Turkey) VakıfBank S.K. |
| (Turkey) Buket Gülübay | (Turkey) Sistem9 Yeşilyurt | (Turkey) VakıfBank S.K. |
| (Turkey) Su Zent] | (Turkey) PTT | (Turkey) Galatasaray HDI Sigorta |
| (United States) McKenzie Adams | (Italy) Imoco Volley Conegliano | (Turkey) Eczacıbaşı VitrA |
| (Belgium) Laura Heyrman | (Italy) Saugella Team Monza | (Turkey) Eczacıbaşı VitrA |
| (Turkey) Hande Korkut | (Turkey) Aydın Büyükşehir | (Turkey) Kuzeyboru |
| (Turkey) Tuna Aybüke Cetinay | (Turkey) Sistem9 Yeşilyurt | (Turkey) Sarıyer Belediyesi |
| (Turkey) Lila Şengün | (Turkey) Fenerbahçe | (Turkey) Sarıyer Belediyesi |
| (Turkey) Ceren Nur Domaç | (Turkey) Kuzeyboru | (Turkey) PTT |
| (Turkey) Merve Nezir | (Turkey) Nilüfer Belediyespor | (Turkey) Karayolları |
| (Turkey) Gamze Alikaya | (Turkey) Eczacıbaşı VitrA | (Turkey) Galatasaray HDI Sigorta |
| (Turkey) Merve Tanıl | (Turkey) Nilüfer Belediyespor | (Turkey) Sarıyer Belediyesi |
| (Turkey) Begüm Hepkaptan | (Turkey) Merinos SK | (Turkey) Sarıyer Belediyesi |
| (Turkey) Yasemin Şahin Yildirim | (Turkey) Nilüfer Belediyespor | (Turkey) Kuzeyboru |
| (Turkey) Hazal Selin Arifoğlu | (Turkey) Galatasaray HDI Sigorta | (Turkey) Kuzeyboru |
| (Turkey) Gülce Güçtekin | (Turkey) Fenerbahçe | (Turkey) Sarıyer Belediyesi |
| (Turkey) Çağla Akın | (Turkey) Galatasaray HDI Sigorta | (Turkey) Nilüfer Belediyespor |
| (Slovenia) Lana Ščuka | (Turkey) Sistem9 Yeşilyurt | (Turkey) İlbank |
| (Turkey) Sinem Bayazit | (Turkey) Sarıyer Belediyesi | (Turkey) İlbank |
| (Belgium) Hélène Rousseaux | (South Korea) Suwon Hyundai E&C Hillstate | (Turkey) PTT |
| (Turkey) Gizem Misra Aşçı | (Turkey) Sarıyer Belediyesi | (Turkey) Karayolları |
| (Turkey) Yasemin Özel | (Turkey) İlbank | (Turkey) Karayolları |
| (Turkey) Şeyma Nur Akbulut | (Turkey) Sarıyer Belediyesi | (Turkey) İlbank |
| (Turkey) Duygu Çetav | (Turkey) Kuzeyboru | (Turkey) İlbank |
| (Turkey) Sila Çalışkan | (Hungary) Vasas Óbuda | (Turkey) PTT |
| (Turkey) Simay Gazi | (Turkey) Nevşehir Bld. | (Turkey) Kuzeyboru |
| (Turkey) Elif Boran | (Turkey) Çukurova Belediyespor | (Turkey) Kuzeyboru |
| (Turkey) Duygu Çetav | (Turkey) Kuzeyboru | (Turkey) Kuzeyboru |
| (Turkey) Ezgi Akyaldiz | (Turkey) Karayolları | (Turkey) Kuzeyboru |
| (Turkey) Işıl Öz | (Turkey) Bolu Bld | (Turkey) Kuzeyboru |
| (Turkey) Çağla Erdem Rızvanoğlu | (Turkey) Sarıyer Belediyesi | (Turkey) PTT |
| (Turkey) Ece Emrullah | (Turkey) Galatasaray HDI Sigorta | (United States) Texas A&M University–Corpus Christi |
| (Turkey) Defne Tokol | (Turkey) Istanbul BBSK | (Turkey) Sigorta Shop KB |
| (Greece) Styliani Christodoulou | (Turkey) Aydın Büyükşehir | (Greece) Olympiacos |
| (United States) Naya Crittenden | (Germany) Dresdner SC | (Turkey) Sarıyer Belediyesi |
| (Turkey) Merve Nur Öztürk | (Turkey) Çanakkale Belediyespor | (Turkey) Aydın Büyükşehir |
| (Turkey) Fatma Beyaz | (Turkey) Bolu Bld. | (Turkey) Galatasaray HDI Sigorta |
| (Italy) Anna Nicoletti | (Italy) Volley Millenium Brescia | (Turkey) Aydın Büyükşehir |
| (Turkey) Ece Kozdere | (Turkey) Karşıyaka SK | (Turkey) Nilüfer Belediyespor |
| (Hungary) Gréta Szakmáry | (Germany) Schweriner SC | (Turkey) Aydın Büyükşehir |
| (Thailand) Ajcharaporn Kongyot | (Thailand) Supreme | (Turkey) Sarıyer Belediyesi |
| (Turkey) Özge Nur Çetiner | (Turkey) THY | (Turkey) Sigorta Shop KB |
| (United States) Hayley Spelman | (Germany) Schweriner SC | (Turkey) Nilüfer Belediyespor |
| (Turkey) Yagmur Mislina Kılıç | (Turkey) PTT | (Turkey) Nilüfer Belediyespor |
| (Turkey) Peyman Yardımcı | (Turkey) Fenerbahçe | (United States) US.Miami |
| (Turkey) Kübra Kegan | (Turkey) Adam Voleybol | (Turkey) Karayolları |
| (Turkey) Aybüke Özdemir | (Turkey) Nilüfer Belediyespor | (Turkey) İlbank |
| (Turkey) Nursevil Aydınlar Gökbudak | (Turkey) THY | (Turkey) Çukurova Belediyespor |
| (Turkey) Sinem Barut | (Turkey) Kuzeyboru | (Turkey) Adam Voleybol |
| (Turkey) İrem Nilşat Kaya | (Turkey) Sistem9 Yeşilyurt | (Turkey) İstanbul BBSK |
| (Turkey) Ayçin Akyol | (Turkey) Kuzeyboru | (Turkey) İstanbul BBSK |
| (Turkey) Arzum Tezcan | (Turkey) Sigorta Shop KB | (Turkey) Karayolları |
| (Turkey) Gözde Yılmaz | (Turkey) VakıfBank S.K. | (Turkey) Karayolları |
| (Bulgaria) Dobriana Rabadžieva | (Brazil) Sesi Bauru | (Turkey) THY |
| (Turkey) Merve Ikbal Albayrak | (Turkey) Sarıyer Belediyesi | (Turkey) Sigorta Shop KB |
| (Turkey) Dilara Yeşil | (Turkey) Kuzeyboru | (Turkey) Merinos SK |
| (Turkey) Gizem Çerağ Düzeltir | (Turkey) Sarıyer Belediyesi | (Turkey) Sigorta Shop KB |

== League table ==
| Qualified for the Play-offs (1-4) |
| Qualified for the Play-offs (5-8) |
| Relegation |

| Pos | Team | Pld | W | L | Pts | SW | SL | SR | SPW | SPL | SPR | Qualification |
|---|---|---|---|---|---|---|---|---|---|---|---|---|
| 1 | VakıfBank Spor Kulübü | 30 | 29 | 1 | 87 | 89 | 8 | 11.125 | 2384 | 1714 | 1.391 | Play-offs (1-4) |
| 2 | Fenerbahçe Opet | 30 | 27 | 3 | 80 | 83 | 19 | 4.368 | 2460 | 1920 | 1.281 | Play-offs (1-4) |
| 3 | Eczacıbaşı Dynavit | 30 | 24 | 6 | 73 | 81 | 29 | 2.793 | 2568 | 2094 | 1.226 | Play-offs (1-4) |
| 4 | Türk Hava Yolları Spor Kulübü | 30 | 23 | 7 | 66 | 72 | 36 | 2.000 | 2466 | 2095 | 1.177 | Play-offs (1-4) |
| 5 | Nilüfer Belediyespor | 30 | 21 | 9 | 62 | 70 | 41 | 1.707 | 2492 | 2249 | 1.108 | Play-offs (5-8) |
| 6 | Galatasaray HDI Sigorta | 30 | 18 | 12 | 52 | 63 | 51 | 1.235 | 2561 | 2365 | 1.083 | Play-offs (5-8) |
| 7 | Aydın Büyükşehir Belediyespor | 30 | 18 | 12 | 50 | 64 | 51 | 1.255 | 2562 | 2474 | 1.036 | Play-offs (5-8) |
| 8 | Yeşilyurt Spor Kulübü | 30 | 15 | 15 | 51 | 60 | 54 | 1.111 | 2472 | 2387 | 1.036 | Play-offs (5-8) |
| 9 | PTT Spor Kulübü | 30 | 15 | 15 | 45 | 55 | 57 | 0.965 | 2421 | 2441 | 0.992 | |
| 10 | Karayolları Spor Kulübü | 30 | 12 | 18 | 37 | 49 | 62 | 0.790 | 2306 | 2455 | 0.939 | |
| 11 | Kuzeyboru | 30 | 11 | 19 | 34 | 49 | 67 | 0.731 | 2380 | 2519 | 0.945 | |
| 12 | Sarıyer Belediyesi Spor Kulübü | 30 | 11 | 19 | 34 | 42 | 62 | 0.677 | 2154 | 2290 | 0.941 | |
| 13 | Çan Gençlik | 30 | 7 | 23 | 23 | 36 | 72 | 0.500 | 2236 | 2455 | 0.911 | Relegation |
| 14 | İlbank | 30 | 7 | 23 | 20 | 31 | 73 | 0.425 | 2151 | 2403 | 0.895 | Relegation |
| 15 | Beşiktaş | 30 | 2 | 28 | 6 | 12 | 84 | 0.143 | 1636 | 2324 | 0.704 | Relegation |
| 16 | Beylikdüzü | 30 | 0 | 30 | 0 | 0 | 90 | 0.000 | 1186 | 2250 | 0.527 | Relegation |

== Play-offs ==
=== Play-offs 1-4 ===
Play-offs 1-4
1 | VakıfBank Spor Kulübü | 2
4 | Türk Hava Yolları Spor Kulübü | 0
2 | Fenerbahçe Opet | 2
3 | Eczacıbaşı Dynavit | 1

Finals
1 | VakıfBank Spor Kulübü | 3
2 | Fenerbahçe Opet | 0
Play-offs 3-4
4 | Türk Hava Yolları Spor Kulübü | 2
3 | Eczacıbaşı Dynavit | 0
