= Ilke =

Ilke or İlke is a given name. Notable people with the name include:

- Ilke Arslan, Turkish American microscopist
- Ilke Gers (born 1981), visual artist, former professional tennis player from New Zealand
- İlke Özyüksel (born 1997), Turkish modern pentathlete
- Ilke Wyludda (1969–2024), discus thrower from Germany

== See also ==
- Ilka
- İlker
- Ilkka (disambiguation)
