= Tuğba Şenoğlu =

Turkish volleyball player

Tuğba Şenoğlu İvegin
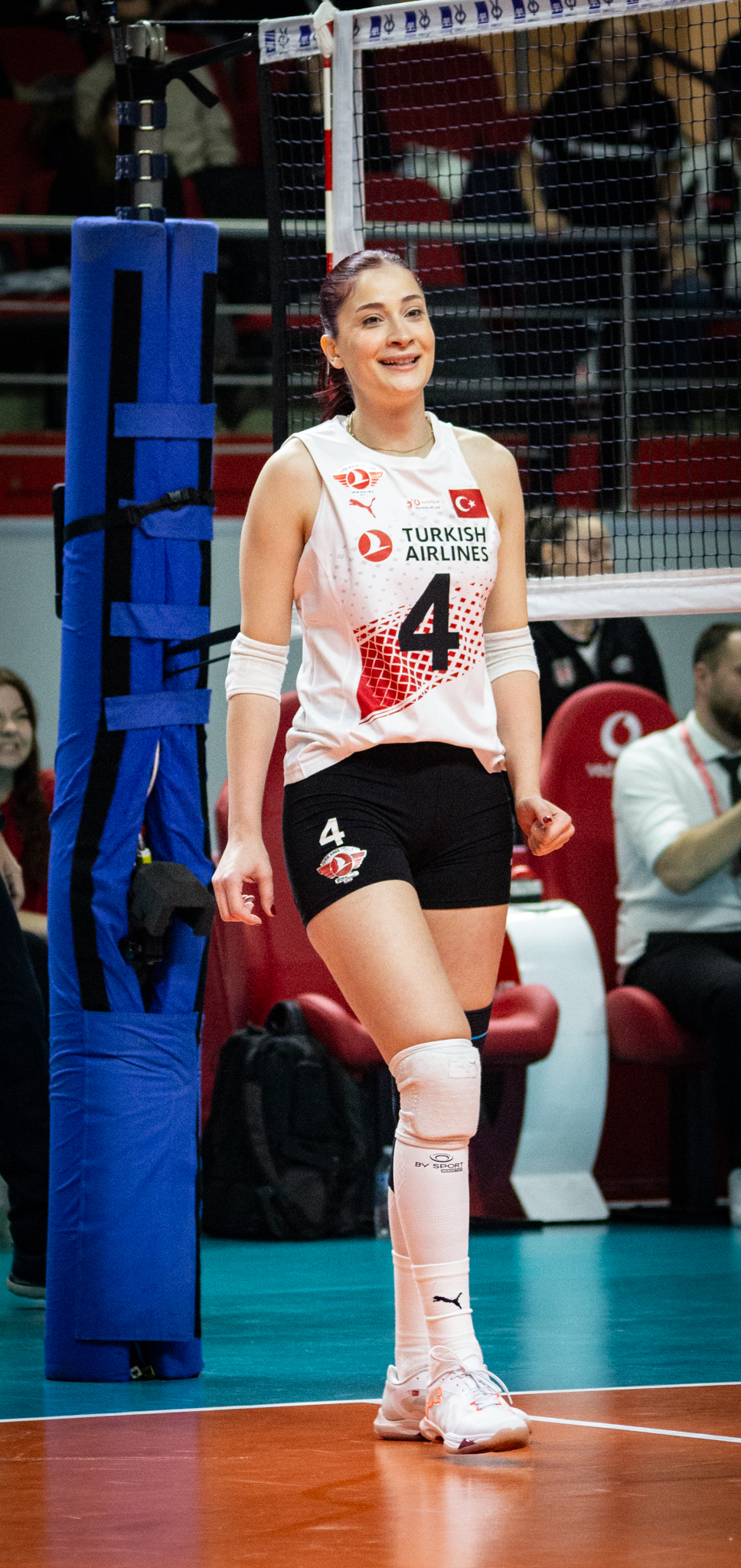
- Şenoğlu in 2018

Personal information
- Full name: Tuğba Şenoğlu İvegin
- Born: Tuğba Şenoğlu; 2 February 1998 (age 28) Tarsus, Mersin, Turkey
- Height: 1.84 m (6 ft 0 in)
- Weight: 64 kg (141 lb)
- Spike: 275 cm (108 in)
- Block: 270 cm (106 in)

Volleyball information
- Position: Wing spiker
- Current club: Türk Hava Yolları
- Number: 4

Career
- Years: Team
- 2013–2016: Vakıfbank
- 2016–2017: → Beşiktaş J.K.
- 2017–2019: Vakıfbank
- 2019–2020: →AtlasGlobal Yeşilyurt
- 2020–2022: Vakıfbank
- 2022–2023: Kurobe AquaFairies
- 2023–2024: Kuzeyboru
- 2025–2026: Türk Hava Yolları
- 2026–: Kuzeyboru

National team
- Years: Team
- 2015: Turkey U-18
- 2017: Turkey U-20
- 2021–: Turkey
Honours
Women's volleyball
Representing Turkey
FIVB Nations League
Bronze medal – third place	2021 Rimini	Team
European Championship
Bronze medal – third place	2021 Serbia/Bulgaria/Croatia/Romania	Team
Bronze medal – third place	2017 Baku	Team
Mediterranean Games
Gold medal – first place	2026 Taanto	Team
Bronze medal – third place	2018 Tarragona	Team

Tuğba Şenoğlu İvegin (born 2 February 1998) is a Turkish volleyball player. She is 1.84 m (6 ft 1/2 in) tall and plays in the wing spiker position for Türk Hava Yolları in Turkey. She is part of the team which qualified for the postponed 2020 Summer Olympics.

== Sports career ==
=== Club ===
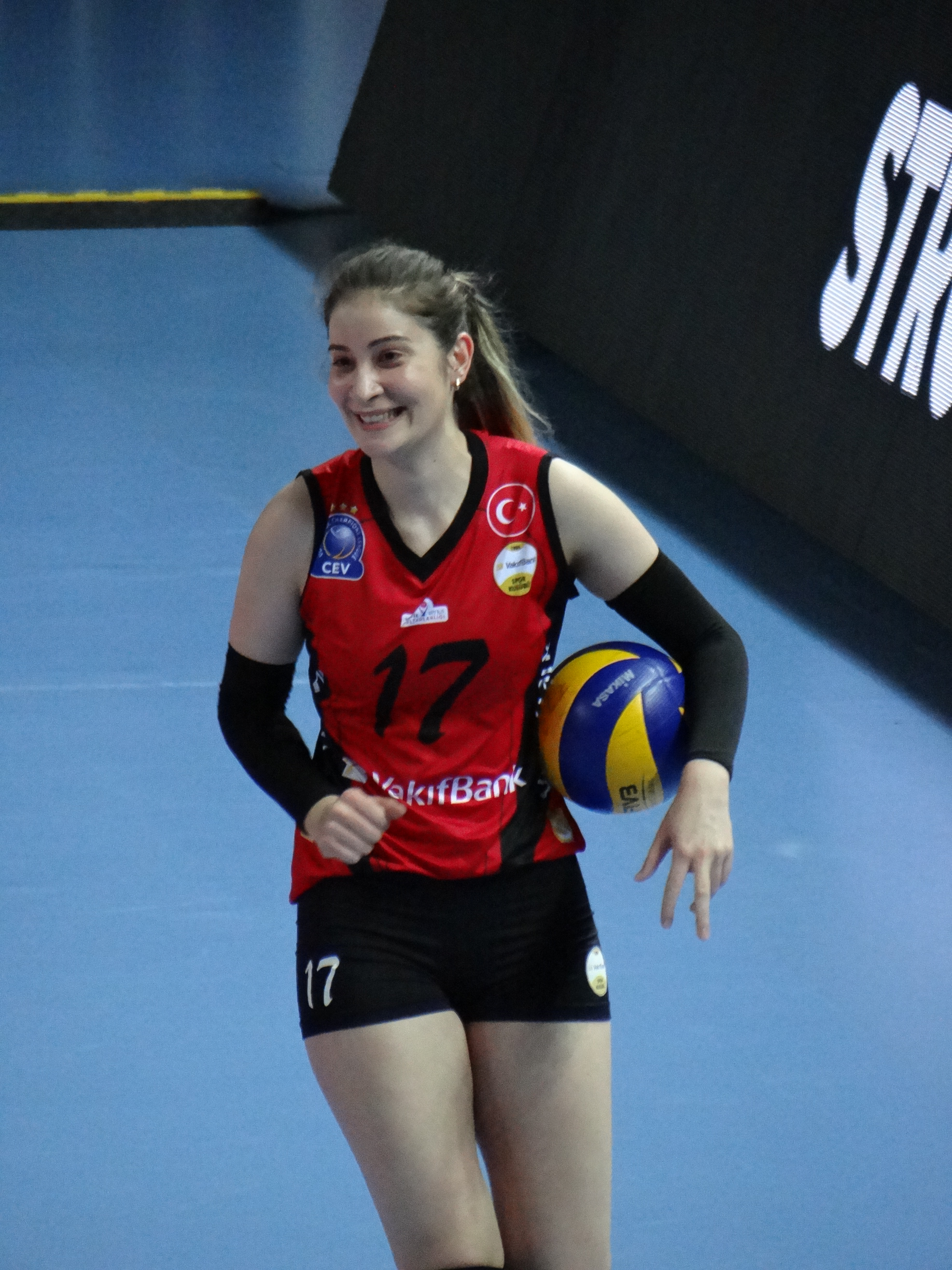
Tuğba Şenoglu of VakıfBank S.K. (April 2018)

At the age of 14, she entered the nursery team of the Vakıfbank S.K. In 2013–14 season, she was part of the team which won the champions title in the Turkey youth and juniors championships. In the 2014–15 season, she was loaned out to İstanbul Büyükşehir Belediyespor and in the 2016–17 season to Beşiktaş J.K. In the 2017–18 season, Şenoğlu was promoted to the Vakıfbank A-team. In the 2018–19 season, she was loaned out to AtlasGlobal Yeşilyurt. She returned to Vakıfbank in May 2020.

Her university team were runners-up at the 2019 European Universities Volleyball Championships held in Łódź, Poland.

She was part of the team which won champions titles in one IVB Club World Championship (2018), one CEV Champions League (2017–18), three Turkish Leagues (2017–18, 2018–19 and 2020–21), two Turkish Cups and a Turkish Super Cup. In May 2022, she transferred to the Japanese team Kurobe Aqua Fairies to play in the V.League. After one season, she returned home, and joined the Aksaray-based club Kuzyboru GSK.

=== International ===
She played at the 2015 Girls' Youth European Volleyball Championship in Bulgaria with the Turkey girls' U-18 team. She was part of the Turkey women's U-20 team at the 2017 FIVB Volleyball Women's U20 World Championship in Mexico, where she was named as a "Best outside spiker" of the "Dream Team" alongside Wu Han of China.

She is a member of the Turkey women's volleyball team, which qualified for the 2020 Summer Olympics.

She captured the gold medal at the 2026 Mediterranean Games in Taranto, Italy.

== Personal life ==
Tuğba Şenoğlu was born in Tarsus, Mersin, southern Turkey on 2 February 1998. She attended Istanbul Aydın University.

On 23 July 2022, she married basketball coach Burhan İvegin in Adana.

== Awards ==
=== Individual ===
- Best outside spiker (Dream team) 2017 FIVB Volleyball Women's U20 World Championship, Mexico

=== Club ===
- Gold 2017–18 Turkish Women's Volleyball League, Vakıfbank
- Gold 2017–18 CEV Women's Champions League, Vakıfbank
- Gold 2018 FIVB Volleyball Women's Club World Championship, Shaoxing, China Vakıfbank
- Gold 2018–19 Turkish Women's Volleyball League, Vakıfbank
- Gold 2020–21 Turkish Women's Volleyball League, Vakıfbank
- Gold 2021–22 Turkish Women's Volleyball League, Vakıfbank
- Gold 2021–22 CEV Women's Champions League, Vakıfbank

=== International ===
- Bronze 2017 Women's European Volleyball Championship, Georgia and Azerbaijan
- Bronze 2018 Mediterranean Games, Tarragona, Spain
- Bronze 2021 FIVB Volleyball Women's Nations League, Rimini, Italy
- Bronze 2021 Women's European Volleyball Championship, Serbia/Bulgaria/Croatia/Romania
- Gold 2026 Mediterranean Games, Tarranto, Italy
