= Ilka =

Ilka is a feminine given name. Notable people with the given name include:

- Ilka Agricola (born 1973), German mathematician
- Ilka Bessin (born 1971), German comedian and actress
- Ilka Chase (1905–1978), American actress and novelist
- Ilka Gedő (1921–1985), Jewish Hungarian artist
- Ilka Groenewold (born 1985), German TV presenter, singer and athlete
- Ilka Grüning (1876–1964), Jewish actress who fled Europe when the Nazis came to power in 1933
- Ilka Minor (born 1975), rallying co-driver from Austria
- Ilka Pálmay (1859–1945), born Ilona Petráss, a Hungarian-born singer and actress
- Ilka Tanya Payán (1943–1996), Dominican-born actress, attorney and AIDS/HIV activist
- Ilka Reinhardt (born 1966), German biologist and wolf expert
- Ilka Schröder (born 1978), German politician
- Ilka Semmler (born 1985), German beach volleyball player
- Ilka Soares (1932–2022), Brazilian actress
- Ilka Stitz (born 1960), German writer
- Ilka Štuhec (born 1990), Slovenian alpine ski racer
- Ilka Van de Vyver (born 1993), Belgian volleyball player
- Ilka White (fl. 2000s–2010s), Australian artist
