= İlker =

İlker is a Turkish given name for males. It means first male, first child.

Notable people named İlker include:

- İlker Aksum (born 1971), Turkish actor
- İlker Avcıbay (born 1978), Turkish footballer
- İlker Aycı (born 1971), Turkish businessperson
- İlker Ayrık (born 1979), Turkish actor, TV presenter, and director
- İlker Başbuğ (born 1943), Turkish former general
- İlker Çatak (born 1984), German film director and screenwriter
- İlker Çınar (born c. 1968–1970), Turkish Army officer, former intelligence agent
- İlker Erbay (born 1984), Turkish footballer
- İlker Kaleli (born 1984), Turkish actor
- İlker Karakaş (born 1999), Turkish footballer
- İlker Kızmaz (born 1975), Turkish actor
- İlker Sayan (born 1993), Turkish footballer
- İlker Yağcıoğlu (born 1966), Turkish footballer and manager

== See also ==
- Ilker Budinov (born 2000), Bulgarian footballer
