= 2019 U Sports Women's Volleyball Championship =

Canadian university volleyball championship

- Season: 2018–19
- Teams: Eight
- Finals site: Saville Community Sports Centre; Edmonton, Alberta
- Champions: UBC Thunderbirds (12th title)
- Runner-up: Ryerson Rams
- Winning coach: Doug Reimer (9th title)
- Championship MVP: Kiera Van Ryk (UBC Thunderbirds)

The 2019 U Sports Women's Volleyball Championship was held March 15–17, 2019, in Edmonton, Alberta, to determine a national champion for the 2018–19 U Sports women's volleyball season. The tournament was played at Saville Community Sports Centre at the University of Alberta. It was the sixth time that Alberta had hosted the tournament with the most recent occurring in 2010.

The eighth-seeded UBC Thunderbirds overcame a two-set deficit in the championship match to defeat the defending champion Ryerson Rams three sets to two to win the 12th championship in program history. It was the first time in U Sports women's volleyball history that a team seeded eighth had won the national championship.

== Participating teams ==
Seed	Team	Qualified	Record	Last	Total
1	Trinity Western Spartans	Canada West Champion	19–5	2015	1
2	Toronto Varsity Blues	OUA Champion	14–5	2016	1
3	Calgary Dinos	Canada West Finalist	19–5	2004	4
4	Dalhousie Tigers	AUS Champion	18–2	1982	1
5	Montreal Carabins	RSEQ Champion	13–7	None	0
6	Ryerson Rams	OUA Finalist	17–2	2018	1
7	Alberta Pandas	Canada West Semifinalist (Host)	18–6	2007	7
8	UBC Thunderbirds	Canada West Semifinalist	15–9	2017	11

== Championship bracket ==
First Round: March 15
1	Trinity Western Spartans	2
8	UBC Thunderbirds	3
4	Dalhousie Tigers	3
5	Montreal Carabins	0
2	Toronto Varsity Blues	1
7	Alberta Pandas	3
3	Calgary Dinos	0
6	Ryerson Rams	3

Semi-Finals: March 16
8	UBC Thunderbirds	3
4	Dalhousie Tigers	1
7	Alberta Pandas	0
6	Ryerson Rams	3

Gold Medal Game: March 17
8	UBC Thunderbirds	3
6	Ryerson Rams	2
Bronze Medal Game: March 17
4	Dalhousie Tigers	2
7	Alberta Pandas	3

== Consolation bracket ==
Semi-Finals: March 16
1	Trinity Western Spartans	3
5	Montreal Carabins	2
2	Toronto Varsity Blues	3
3	Calgary Dinos	1

Fifth Place Game: March 17
1	Trinity Western Spartans	3
2	Toronto Varsity Blues	2

== Awards ==
=== Championship awards ===
- CIS Championship MVP – Kiera Van Ryk, UBC
- R.W. Pugh Fair Play Award – Brie O’Reilly, Trinity Western

=== All-Star Team ===
- Olivia Furlan, UBC
- Kiera Van Ryk, UBC
- Tessa Davis, UBC
- Theanna Vernon, Ryerson
- Lauren Veltman, Ryerson
- Kory White, Alberta
- Courtney Baker, Dalhousie
