= Karmen Aksoy =

Turkish volleyball player (born 2003)

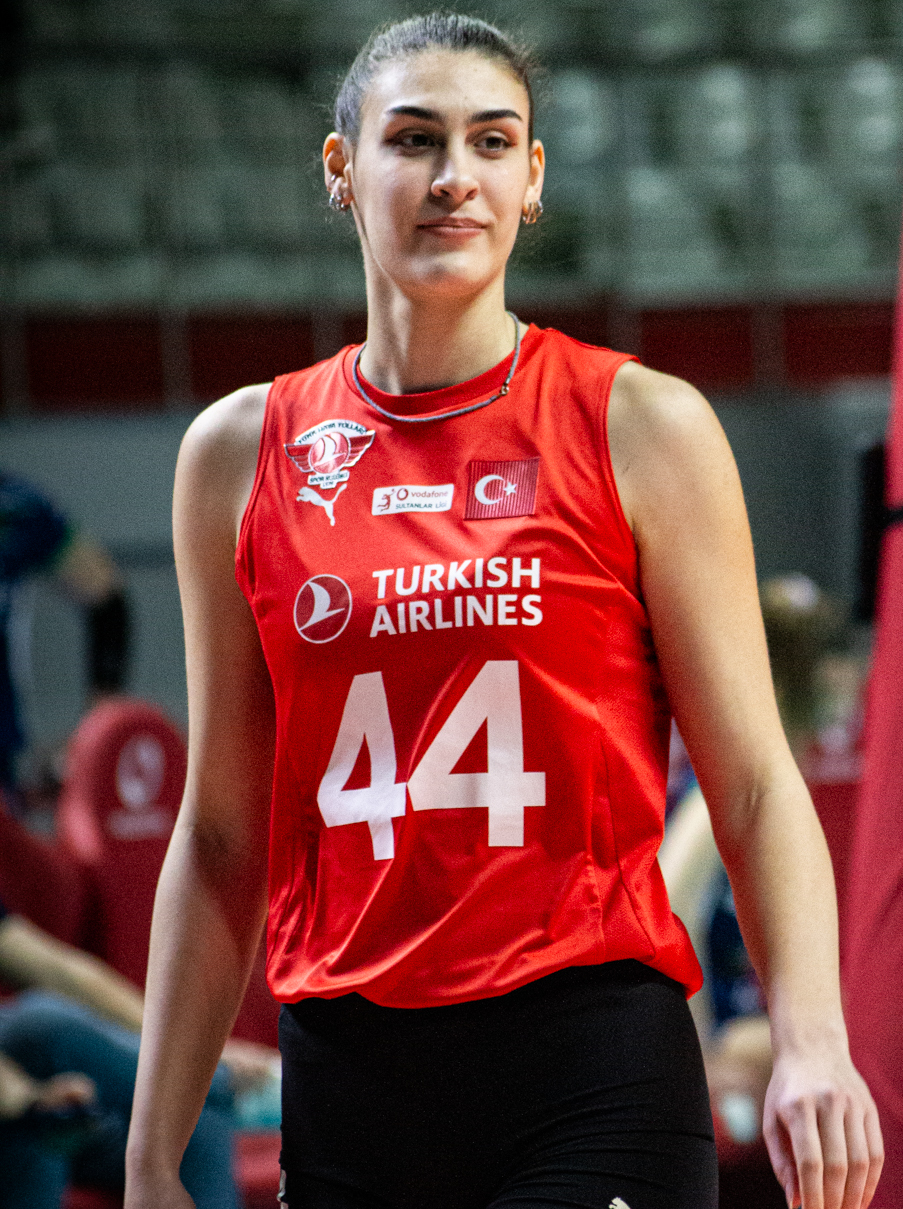
- Karmen Aksoy in 2025

Personal information
- Full name: Karmen Aksoy
- Born: 8 July 2003 (age 23); Turkey
- Height: 1.92 m (6 ft 3 1/2 in)
- Weight: 73 kg (161 lb)
- Spike: 310 cm (120 in)
- Block: 303 cm (119 in)

Volleyball information
- Position: Middle-Blocker

Career
Years
- 2019–2022
- 2022–
- 2022–2023
- 2023–2024
- 2024–2026
Teams
- Vakıfbank Istanbul II
- Vakıfbank Istanbul
- → Galatasaray
- → Türk Hava Yolları
- Türk Hava Yolları

National team
Turkey
Honours
Women's volleyball
Representing Turkey
Islamic Solidarity Games
Gold medal – first place	2025 Rıyadh	Team

Karmen Aksoy (born 8 July 2003) is a Turkish volleyball player. She is 192 cm (6.30 ft) tall at 73 kg (161 lb) and plays in the Middle-Blocker position who last played for Türk Hava Yolları.

== Club career ==
On 9 November 2021, she played her first match with Vakıfbank against Sarıyer Belediyespor.

Aksoy, who was born on 8 July 2003, grew up with Vakıfbank Istanbul infrastructure and wore the VakıfBank jersey for the first time in this match, finished the match with 8 points, which she started in the first 6 games.

On August 16, 2022, she signed a one-year loan contract with Galatasaray.

== International career ==
Aksoy was part of the Turkey team, which became champion at the 2025 Islamic Solidarity Games in Riyadh, Saudi Arabia.

On 17 August 2026, her contract has been terminated by Türk Hava Yolları after she suffered an injury to the ACL of her right knee during the match against Belgium in the second week of the FIVB Nations League on June 17.

== Honours ==
Turkey
(gold) 2025 Islamic Solidarity Games
