= Ergül Avcı Eroğlu =

Turkish volleyball player (born 1987)

Ergül Eroğlu
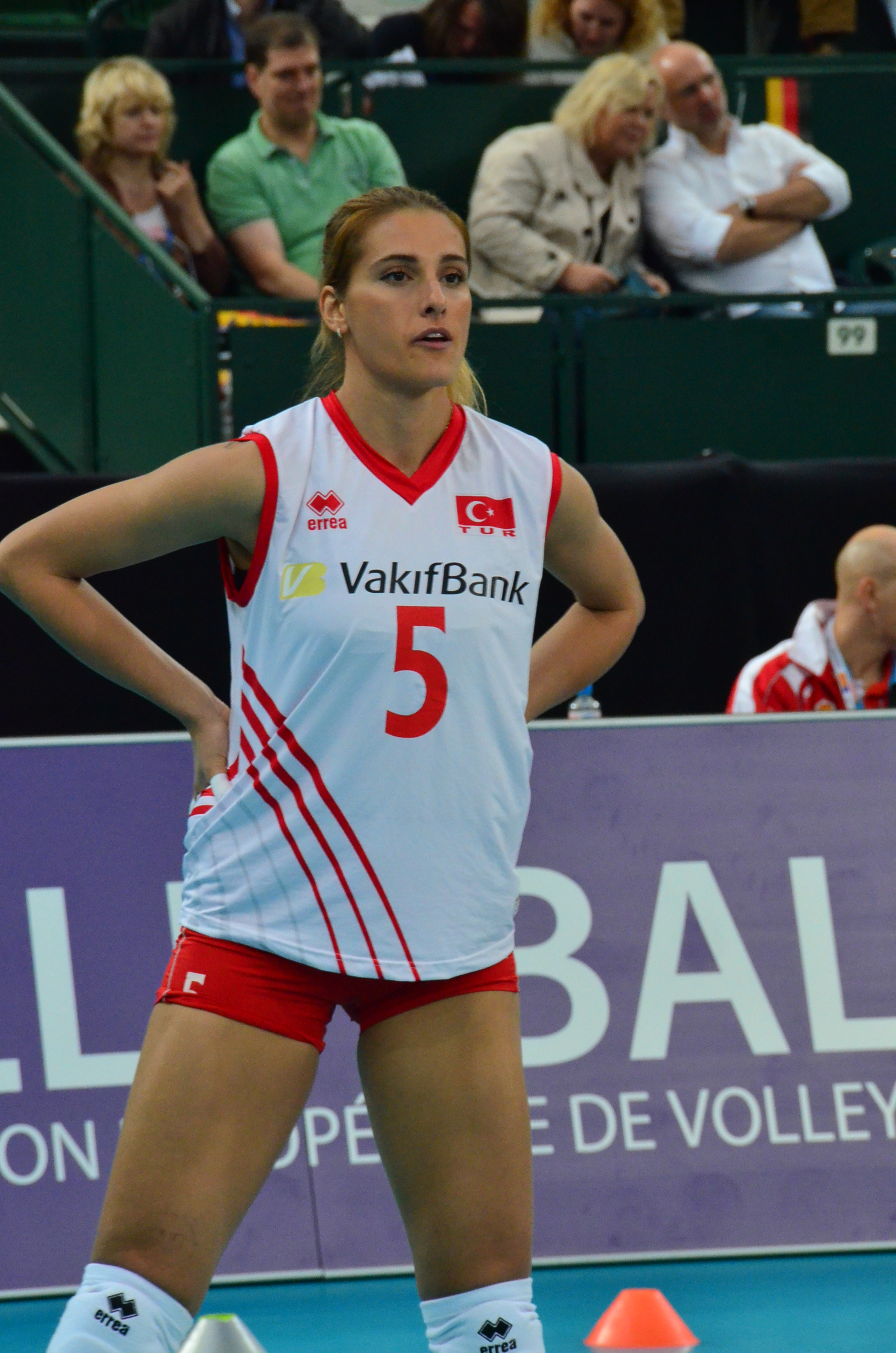

Personal information
- Full name: Ergül Avcı Eroğlu
- Born: July 24, 1987 (age 39); Bursa, Turkey
- Height: 1.90 m (6 ft 3 in)
- Weight: 72 kg (159 lb)
- Spike: 309 cm (122 in)
- Block: 288 cm (113 in)

Volleyball information
- Position: Middle Blocker
- Current club: (Turkey) Aydın Büyükşehir Belediyespor
- Number: 6

Career
Years	Teams
2003–2009; 2009–2010; 2010–2011; 2011–2013; 2013–2014; 2014–2015; 2015–2017; 2017–2018; 2018–2019; 2019–2020; 2020–2021; 2021–	Yeşilyurt; Nilüfer Belediyespor; Fenerbahçe Acıbadem; VakıfBank; Galatasaray Daikin; İdman Ocağı; Fenerbahçe Grundig; Bursa Büyükşehir Belediyespor; Beylikdüzü Voleybol İhtisas; Eczacıbaşı VitrA; Galatasaray HDI Sigorta; Aydın Büyükşehir Belediyespor

National team
2009–present	Turkey
Medal record
Women's volleyball
Representing Turkey
European League
Silver medal – second place	2009 Kayseri	Team
Mediterranean Games
Silver medal – second place	2013 Mersin	Team

Ergül Avcı Eroğlu (pronounced [ˈæɾɟyl ˈavdʒɯ]; born July 24, 1987) is a Turkish volleyball player. She is 190 cm (75 in) and plays as middle blocker.

== Career ==
On 13 August 2020, she signed a 1-year contract with the Galatasaray Women's Volleyball Team.

== Awards ==
=== Clubs ===
- 2008-09 Women's CEV Top Teams Cup - 3rd place, with Fenerbahçe Acıbadem
- 2008-09 Aroma Women's Volleyball League - Champion, with Fenerbahçe Acıbadem
- 2008-09 Turkish Cup - Runner-Up, with Fenerbahçe Acıbadem
- 2010 FIVB World Club Championship - Champion, with Fenerbahçe Acıbadem
- 2010-11 CEV Champions League - Bronze medal, with Fenerbahçe Acıbadem
- 2010-11 Aroma Women's Volleyball League - Champion, with Fenerbahçe Acıbadem
- 2011-12 Aroma Women's Volleyball League - Runner-Up, with Vakıfbank Spor Kulübü
- 2012-13 Turkish Cup - Champion, with Vakıfbank Spor Kulübü
- 2012–13 CEV Champions League - Champion, with Vakıfbank Spor Kulübü
- 2012-13 Turkish Women's Volleyball League - Champion, with Vakıfbank Spor Kulübü
- 2014-15 Turkish Super Cup - Champion, with Fenerbahçe Grundig
- 2021–22 Turkish Super Cup - Champion, with Fenerbahçe Opet
- 2022–23 Turkish Volleyball League Champion, with Fenerbahçe Opet
- 2023–24 Turkish Volleyball Cup Champion, with Fenerbahçe Opet

=== National ===
- 2009 Women's European Volleyball League - Silver
- 2013 Mediterranean Games - Silver
