= Ilka Stitz =

German writer of historical thrillers (born 1960)

Ilka Stitz

Ilka Stitz (born 22 October 1960) is a German writer of historical thrillers.

== Biography ==
Stitz was born in Hanover, Germany. She studied art history, German studies and classical archaeology in Göttingen and Cologne. Her interest in Roman history and many visits to historical sites in Turkey inspired her to write historical novels.

She now resides and works in Cologne. Together with Karola Hagemann, she formed the writing duo of Hagemann & Stitz, which under the pseudonym "Malachy Hyde" has to date written six novels and five short stories.

== Select bibliography ==
with Karola Hagemann

  - 1999 (as Malachy Hyde) Tod und Spiele, Diederichs
  - 2002 (as Malachy Hyde) Eines jeden Kreuz, Weitbrecht
  - 2004 (as Malachy Hyde) Wisse, dass du sterblich bist
  - 2006 (as Hagemann & Stitz) Das Geheimnis des Mithras-Tempels, Grafit 2006, ISBN 978-3-89425-603-6
  - 2007 (as Malachy Hyde) Gewinne der Götter Gunst
  - 2009 (as Hagemann & Stitz) Jung stirbt, wen die Götter lieben, Grafit 2009, ISBN 978-3-89425-610-4

Short stories

  - 2010: Mit eiserner Zunge, in: Der Ring der Niedersachsen, Zu Klampen Publisher
- with Karola Hagemann:
  - 2004 Das Vermächtnis der Colonia Ulpia Traiana, in: Mord am Niederrhein, Grafit Publisher
  - 2004 Das Gold der Erde, in: Tatort FloraFarm, Juwi Macmillan Publisher
  - 2005 Die Götter sind müde in: Mords-Feste. Kalenderkrimis vom Tatort Niederrhein, Leporello Publisher
  - 2006 Die Venus von Schloss Dyck in: Radieschen von unten. Leporello Publisher 2006, ISBN 978-3-936783-16-2
  - 2009 Die Entflammten in: Das steinerne Auge. Bookspot Publisher
