= Yağmur Mislina Kılıç =

Turkish volleyball player (born 1996)

Personal information
- Full name: Yağmur Mislina Kılıç
- Nationality: Turkish
- Born: 30 March 1996 (age 30) Hatay, Turkey
- Height: 1.89 m (6 ft 2 in)
- Weight: 66 kg (146 lb)
- Spike: 283 cm (111 in)
- Block: 280 cm (110 in)

Volleyball information
- Position: Wing spiker
- Current club: Ilisiakós
- Number: 1

Career
- Years: Team
- 2014–2018: Galatasaray
- 2018–2019: Türk Hava Yolları
- 2019–2020: Beşiktaş
- 2020: Kale 1957 Spor
- 2020–2021: PTT Spor
- 2022–2023: PTT Spor
- 2023–2024: AO Lamia 2013
- 2024: AONS Milon
- 2024–2025: Aris Thessaloniki
- 2025–: Ilisiakós

National team
- Years: Team
- 2015–2018: Turkey
Honours
Women's volleyball
Representing Turkey
FIVB Volleyball Nations League
Silver medal – second place	2018 Nanjing	Team
Islamic Solidarity Games
Silver medal – second place	2017 Baku	Team

Yağmur Mislina Kılıç (born 30 May 1996) is a Turkish volleyball player for Kale 1957 Spor and the Turkish national team.

She participated at the 2015 FIVB Volleyball Women's U20 World Championship, and 2018 FIVB Volleyball Women's Nations League.
