= Ilka White =

Australian artist

Ilka Jane White
- Born: Maryborough, Victoria
- Education: Monash University; Melbourne Institute of Textiles
- Known for: Textile art

Ilka Jane White is an Australian artist. Her practice spans projects in textiles, drawing, sculpture and installation, art-in-community and cross disciplinary collaboration. Direct engagement with the natural world is central to White's making process. Her current work explores relationships between the mind, body, time and place, and questions the separation of these elements.

== Early life and education ==
White was born in Ivanhoe, Melbourne and grew up in the rural Victorian town of Maryborough, Shire of Central Goldfields with a steady stream of musicians, artists and makers dropping into the family home. White went on to study fashion design so she could become a costume designer and maker for the theatre. After a few years working with costumes, White studied weaving and attained an Associate Diploma in Studio Textiles from Melbourne Institute of Textiles – now RMIT University. In 2008 White completed her Bachelor of Fine Arts (Tapestry) from Monash University in Melbourne. Between 1999 and 2011 White taught on art and textiles at RMIT and was the teaching artist in residence at the Australian National University School of Art in 2012.

== Exhibitions ==
- Whitework: A Contemporary Trousseau, Craft Victoria Gallery, Melbourne, Australia, April 2004
- In the World: (head, hand, heart), 17th Tamworth Fibre Textile Biennial, National tour, Australia, 2006
- WALK, Portland Arts Centre, Portland, Victoria and National Tour, Australia, 2006–2009
- Drawing Out, First Site Gallery, RMIT and Big Screen, Federation Square, Melbourne, Australia, 2010
- Life in Your Hands: (Art from Solastalgia), Lake Macquarie City Art Gallery, National Tour, Australia, 2012
- Material Culture', Counihan Gallery, Brunswick, Australia, 2012
- Petite: Miniature Textiles, Exhibitions Gallery, Wangaratta, Australia, 2012
- Spinifex Country, Flinders University City Gallery, Adelaide, Australia, 2013
- TIME, Poimena Art Gallery, Launceston, Australia, 2013
- Contemporary Textiles, Exhibitions Gallery, Wangaratta, Australia, 2013
- GhostNets Fish, Martin Browne Contemporary, Paddington, Australia, 2014
- Partnership, Lot19, Castlemaine, Australia, 2014
- Artists for the Tarkine, Brightspace, St Kilda, Australia, 2014
- Walking the Merri, RMIT Project Space, Carlton, Australia, 2014
- Group Exchange, 2nd Tamworth Fibre Textile Triennial, National tour 2014-2016

== See also ==
Australian art
