= Ilka Schröder =

German politician (born 1978)

Member of the European Parliament for Germany
- In office 20 July 1999 – 19 July 2004

Personal details
- Born: 22 January 1978 (age 48) Berlin
- Party: Alliance 90/The Greens (–2000)
- Profession: Politician

Ilka Schröder (born 22 January 1978) is a German politician. She was elected a Member of the European Parliament (MEP) in the 1999 European parliamentary election for Alliance 90/The Greens. At the time, she was the youngest MEP in history. Schröder left the Greens in September 2001 and the European Parliament at the end of her five-year term.
