= Çağla Akın =

Turkish volleyball player (born 1995)

Personal information
- Born: 19 January 1995 (age 31) Istanbul, Turkey
- Height: 1.77 m (5 ft 9 1/2 in)
- Weight: 70 kg (154 lb)
- Spike: 285 cm (112 in)
- Block: 275 cm (108 in)

Volleyball information
- Position: Setter
- Current club: Türk Hava Yolları
- Number: 7

Career
- Years: Team
- 2009–2012; 2012–2013; 2013–2016; 2016–2017; 2017–2018; 2018–2021; 2021–2022; 2024–: VakıfBank Türk Telekom; Beşiktaş; VakıfBank Türk Telekom; Beşiktaş; Fenerbahçe; Galatasaray; Nilüfer Belediyespor; Türk Hava Yolları

National team
- Years: Team
- 2011; 2012-present: Girls' youth; Women's junior
Honours
Women's volleyball
Representing Turkey
Women's European Volleyball League
Gold medal – first place	2014 Germany/Turkey	Team
European Games
Gold medal – first place	2015 Baku	Team
Montreux Volley Masters
Gold medal – first place	2015 Montreux	Team
Women's U23 World Championship
Gold medal – first place	2017 Ljubljana	Team
Silver medal – second place	2015 Ankara	Team
Women's Junior European Championship
Gold medal – first place	2012 Ankara	Team
Girls Youth World Championship
Gold medal – first place	2011 Ankara	Team
European Youth Olympic Festival
Bronze medal – third place	2011 Trabzon	Team
- Updated on 13 October 2013

Çağla Akın (born 19 January 1995 in Istanbul, Turkey) is a Turkish volleyball player who won the gold medal at the 2013 Club World Championship and now playing with Türk Hava Yolları.

== Personal information ==
She is 178 cm (5.84 ft) tall at 60 kg (130 lb). Her parents were national handball players.

== Career ==
She played for the VakıfBank Türk Telekom before she transferred in 2012 to Beşiktaş. Akın was a member of the girls' youth national team and the women's junior national team.

Akın won the gold medal at the 2013 Club World Championship playing with Vakıfbank Istanbul.

== Clubs ==
- (Turkey) VakıfBank Türk Telekom Junior (2009–2011)
- (Turkey) VakıfBank Türk Telekom (2011–2012)
- (Turkey) Beşiktaş Junior (2012–2013)
- (Turkey) Vakıfbank Istanbul (2013–2014)
- (Turkey) Beşiktaş (2014–2017)
- (Turkey) Fenerbahçe (2017–2018)
- (Turkey) Galatasaray (2018–2021)

== Awards ==
=== National team ===
- 2011 FIVB Girls Youth World Championship – Gold
- 2011 European Youth Summer Olympic Festival – Bronze
- 2012 Women's Junior European Volleyball Championship – Gold
- 2014 Women's European Volleyball League – Gold
- 2015 FIVB Volleyball Women's U23 World Championship – Silver

=== Clubs ===
- 2013 Club World Championship – Champion, with Vakıfbank Istanbul

== See also ==
- Turkish women in sports
