= Ilkka =

Ilkka may refer to:

- Ilkka (company), a Finnish publishing house based in Southern Ostrobothnia
- Ilkka (given name), Finnish given name
- Ilkka (newspaper), Finnish newspaper
