= İlker Avcıbay =

Turkish footballer

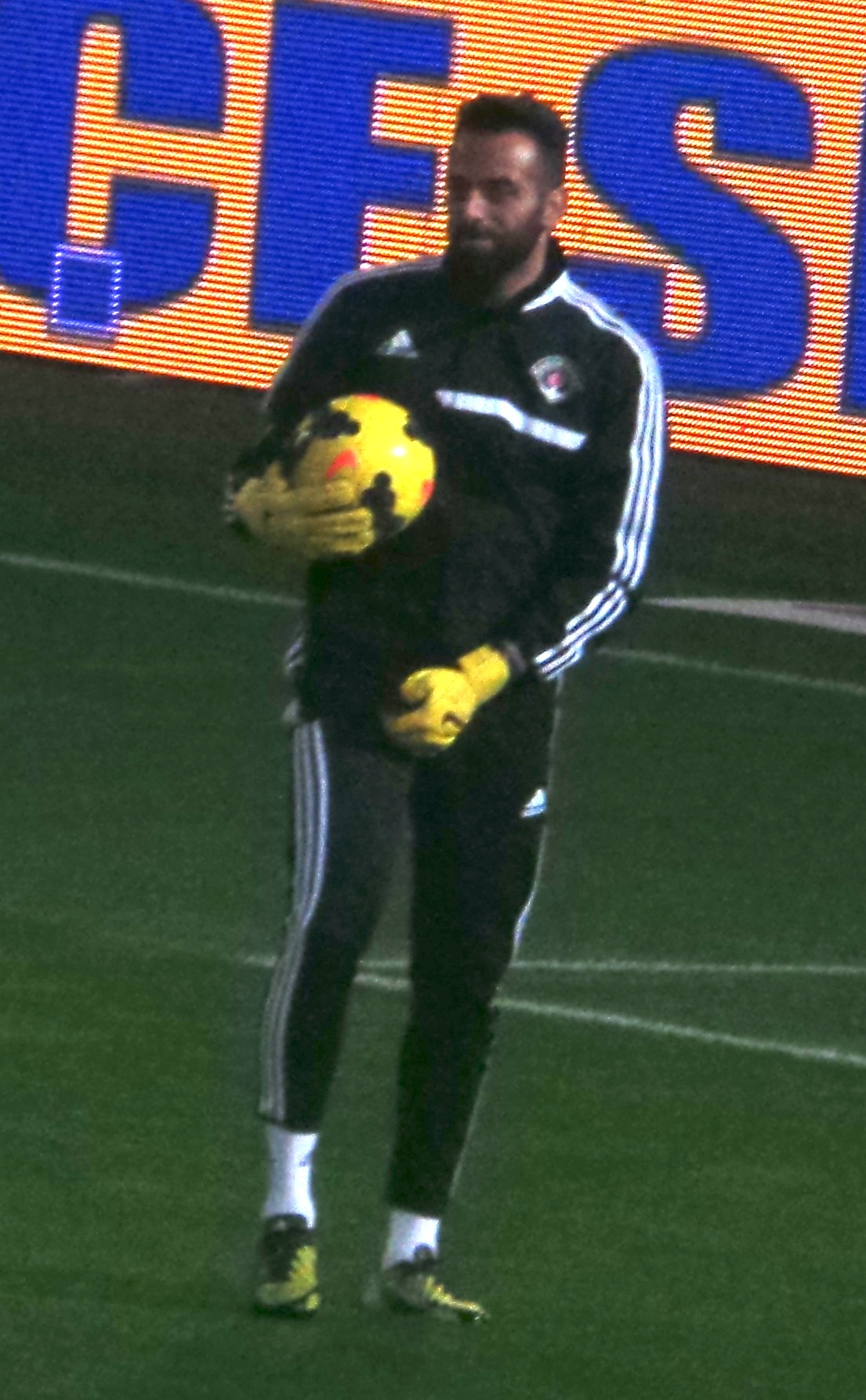

Personal information
- Full name: İlker Avcıbay
- Date of birth: October 1, 1978 (age 48)
- Place of birth: Karataş, Adana, Turkey
- Height: 1.86 m (6 ft 1 in)
- Position: Goalkeeper

Team information
- Current team: Giresunspor (goalkeeping coach)

Senior career*
Years	Team	Apps	(Gls)
1997–2000	Fırat Üniversitesi	34	(0)
2000–2003	Elazığspor	21	(0)
2003–2005	Denizlispor	0	(0)
2005	Altay	10	(0)
2005–2006	Antalyaspor	2	(0)
2007–2008	Adana Demirspor	30	(0)
2008–2009	Konyaspor	0	(0)
2009	→ Manisaspor (loan)	1	(0)
2009–2012	Manisaspor	65	(0)
2012–2014	Kasımpaşa	2	(0)
2014–2016	Gaziantep BB	17	(0)
2015–2016	Bayrampaşaspor	13	(0)
2016–2017	Manisa BB	29	(0)

Managerial career
- 2018–2020: Balıkesirspor (goalkeeping coach)
- 2020: Yeni Malatyaspor (goalkeeping coach)
- 2021: Ankaragücü (goalkeeping coach)
- 2021–: Giresunspor (goalkeeping coach)
- * Club domestic league appearances and goals

İlker Avcıbay (born 1 October 1978) is a Turkish former footballer who played as a goalkeeper, and current goalkeeping coach of Giresunspor.

== Club career ==
Avcıbay moved to Elazığspor in 2000. He has spent his entire career in Turkey, playing for Denizlispor, Altay, Antalyaspor, Adana Demirspor and Konyaspor. He joined Manisaspor on loan during the second half of the 2008-09 season, before making the move permanent at the end of the season.

In 2012, he joined Kasımpaşa, and was used mainly as a backup to Andreas Isaksson. Over the two years he was there, he made five appearances for the club; two in the Süper Lig and three in the Turkish Cup. In 2014, he joined Gaziantep Büyükşehir Belediyespor, and was appointed the club captain upon his arrival.

In August 2015, he joined Bayrampaşa SK then moved to Manisa FK in January 2016.

He retired on January 17, 2017.
