= Türk Hava Yolları SK =

Turkish volleyball team

Türk Hava Yolları Spor Kulübü
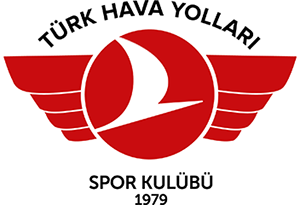
- Full name: Türk Hava Yolları Spor Kulübü
- Short name: THY
- Founded: 1979 / 2016
- Ground: TVF Burhan Felek Sport Hall (Capacity: 7,000)
- Chairman: (Turkey) Ahmet Bolat
- Manager: (Turkey) Kamil Söz
- Captain: (Turkey) Büşra Kılıçlı
- League: Sultanlar Ligi
- 2024–25: 6th
- Website: Club home page
- Championships: 2 BVA Cup; 1 Turkish Volleyball 1.League

Uniforms
Home	Away

Türk Hava Yolları Women's Volleyball Team is a Turkish women's volleyball team from Istanbul which is owned by Turkish Airlines. This team play their matches at the 7.000-seated TVF Burhan Felek Sport Hall.

The club was founded in 1979 but withdrew from volleyball leagues in the 1993–1994 season. In 2016, with Turkish Airlines chairman of the board and executive committee İlker Aycı being elected as the club president, the team returned to the volleyball arena and started its competition in the Turkish Women's Volleyball 2nd League. In the 2016–2017 season, it was promoted from the Turkish Women's 2nd League to the 1st League, and in the 2017–2018 season, it was promoted from the 1st League to the Sultanlar Ligi as the champion.

- Turkish Women's Volleyball League (1985–1994)
- Turkish Women's Volleyball 2nd League (2016–2017)
- Turkish Women's Volleyball 1st League (2017–2018)
- Turkish Volleyball Sultanlar Ligi (2018–present)

== Honours ==
=== European competitions ===
- CEV Cup: (bronze) 2022–23
- CEV Challenge Cup: (bronze) 2020–21
- BVA Cup: (gold) 2019, 2020

=== Domestic competitions ===
- Turkish Volleyball League: (bronze) 2020–21
- Turkish Volleyball 1.League: (gold) 2017–18
- Turkish Volleyball 2.League Group A: (silver) 2016–17
- Turkish Cup: (bronze) 2021–22, 2023–24

== Roster ==
Season 2024–2025

No	Player	Position	Birth Date	Height	Nation
1	Melis Yılmaz	Libero	28 June 1997	1.67	Turkey
2	Buse Kayacan Sonsırma	Libero	15 July 1992	1.76	Turkey
3	Emine Arıcı	Middle Blocker	17 January 1997	1.92	Turkey
4	Tuğba Şenoğlu İvegin	Outside Hitter	2 February 1998	1.84	Turkey
6	Özlem Tuğral	Setter	21 October 2001	1.83	Turkey
7	Çağla Çiçekoğlu	Setter	19 January 1995	1.77	Turkey
8	Ada Germen Korkmaz	Wing Spiker	24 June 1997	1.83	Turkey
9	Büşra Kılıçlı (C)	Middle Blocker	16 July 1990	1.88	Turkey
10	Selin Coşkun	Opposite	16 July 1990	1.90	Turkey
11	Anthí Vasilantonáki	Outside Hitter	9 April 1996	1.96	Greece
12	Diana Duarte	Middle Blocker	22 February 1999	1.94	Brazil
14	Melis Durul	Outside Hitter	21 October 1993	1.83	Turkey
17	Júlia Bergmann	Outside Hitter	21 February 2001	1.91	Brazil
21	Roberta Ratzke	Setter	28 April 1990	1.85	Brazil
22	Hanna Orthmann	Outside hitter	3 October 1998	1.88	Germany
44	Karmen Aksoy	Middle Blocker	8 July 2003	1.92	Turkey

== Notable players ==
Criteria

To appear in this section a player must have either:

- Played at least one season for the club.
- Set a club record or won an individual award while at the club.
- Played at least one official international match for their national team at any time.
- To perform very successfully during period in the club or at later/previous stages of his career.

Azerbaijan

- Polina Rahimova

Belgium

- Freya Aelbrecht

Brazil

- Júlia Bergmann
- Macris Carneiro
- Diana Duarte
- Roberta Ratzke

Bulgaria

- Dobriana Rabadžieva
- Hristina Ruseva

Canada

- Emily Maglio
- Kiera Van Ryk

China

- Su Zent

Czech Republic

- Aneta Havlíčková

Germany

- Hanna Orthmann

Greece

- Anthí Vasilantonáki

Netherlands

- Anne Buijs

Puerto Rico

- Stephanie Enright
- Daly Santana

Serbia

- Jelena Nikolić

Turkey

- Kübra Akman
- Karmen Aksoy
- Emine Arıcı
- Naz Aydemir
- Dicle Nur Babat
- Çağla Çiçekoğlu
- Merve Dalbeler
- Zeynep Sude Demirel
- Şeyma Ercan Küçükaslan
- Aslı Kalaç
- Ebrar Karakurt
- Buse Kayacan Sonsırma
- Büşra Kılıçlı
- Özge Kırdar Kinasts
- Neriman Özsoy
- İpek Soroğlu
- Tuğba Şenoğlu İvegin
- Bahar Toksoy
- Polen Uslupehlivan
- Melis Yılmaz
- Özgenur Yurtdagülen

United States

- Lauren Carlini
- TeTori Dixon
- Madison Kingdon

Players written in italic still play for the club.

== Technical and managerial staff ==
Staff as of November 8, 2024

Name	Position
(Turkey) Asuman Karakoyun Baş	Team manager
(Turkey) Kamil Söz	Head coach
(Turkey) Yalçın Özbek	Assistant coach
(Turkey) Baran Yılmaz	Coach
(Turkey) Muhammet Karakuş	Statistician
(Turkey) Abdullah Akay	Physiotherapist
(Turkey) Bilal Aslan	Physiotherapist
(Turkey) Yusuf Karadaş	Doctor

== Head coaches ==
This is a list of the senior team's head coaches in the recent years.

Period	Head coach
2018–2019	(Turkey) Suphi Doğancı
2019–2023	(Italy) Marcello Abbondanza
2023–2023	(Turkey) Kamil Söz
2023–2024	(Brazil) Zé Roberto
2024–	(Turkey) Kamil Söz

== See also ==
- Turkish Airlines
