= Anthí Vasilantonáki =

Greek volleyball player

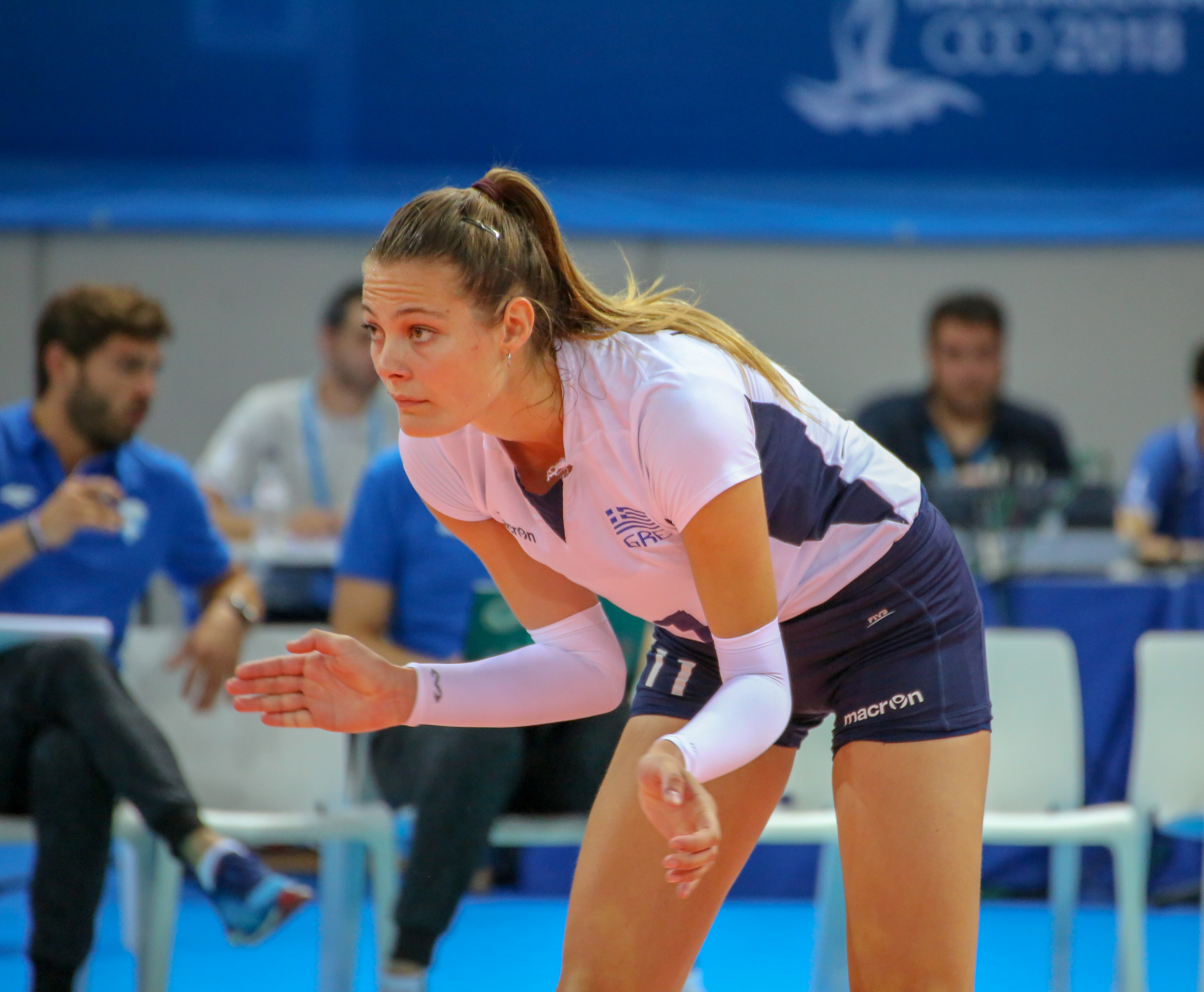

Personal information
- Full name: Anthí Vasilantonáki
- Born: 9 April 1996 (age 30); Athens, Greece
- Height: 1.96 m (6 ft 5 in)
- Weight: 80 kg (180 lb)
- Spike: 305 cm (120 in)
- Block: 285 cm (112 in)

Volleyball information
- Position: Outside hitter
- Current club: Türk Hava Yolları
- Number: 11

Career
Years
- 2010–2012
- 2012–2014
- 2014–2016
- 2016–2017
- 2017–2018
- 2018–2019
- 2019–2020
- 2020–2021
- 2021–2023
- 2023–
Teams
- Enosi Vyrona
- Panathinaikos
- Imoco Volley
- Unet Yamamay Busto Arsizio
- Igor Gorgonzola Novara
- Polisportiva Filottrano Pallavolo
- Galatasaray
- Aydın Büyükşehir Belediyespor
- Galatasaray
- Türk Hava Yolları

National team
Greece

Anthí Vasilantonáki (born 9 April 1996 in Athens, Greece) is a Greek female volleyball player. She is 196 cm (6.43 ft) tall at 80 kg (180 lb) and plays in the Outside Hitter position. She plays for Türk Hava Yolları.

== Career ==
On 14 May 2021, she signed a 1-year contract with the Galatasaray Women's Volleyball Team.

== Personal ==
Her father is from Chania, and her mother is Dutch from Amsterdam.
