= İlbank =

İlbank A.Ş.
- Type: Bank
- Industry: Finance, insurance
- Founded: 1933; 93 years ago as the Bank of Municipalities; 2011; 15 years ago
- Headquarters: Ulus, Çankaya, Ankara
- Number of locations: 19 offices
- Area served: Turkey
- Products: Financial services, investment banking, engineering and consulting
- Net income: ▲ ₺291.588 million (2012)
- Total equity: ▲ ₺ 18.000 billion (2014)
- Number of employees: 2,467
- Website: www.ilbank.gov.tr

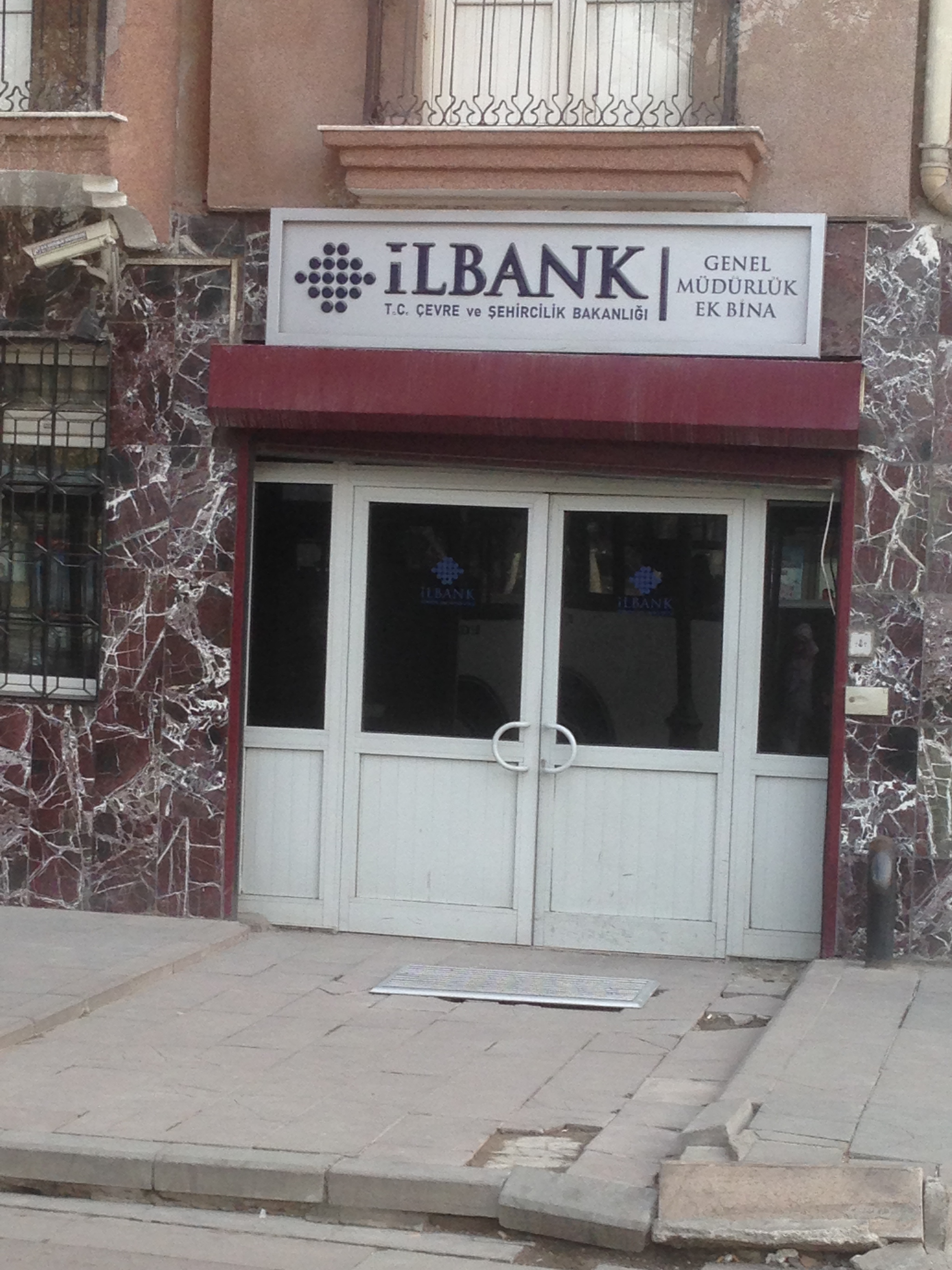
Entrance to İlbank's annex building in Ankara

Ilbank A.Ş., short for İller Bankası Anonim Şirketi, is a public development and investment bank based in Ankara, Turkey. It is subordinated to the Ministry of Environment and Urban Planning. The main areas of expertise of Ilbank are banking and insurance, mapping, drinking water supplies and treatment, sewage collection and disposal, wastewater treatment, solid waste management, urban superstructures.

== History ==
İlbank was founded on 11 June 1933, under the name Bank of Municipalities (Turkish: Belediyeler Bankası) pursuant to Law No. 2301. Afterwards, the name of the bank was changed to "İller Bankası" on July 27, 1944, amid debates during the Budget Committee due to the fact that Special Provincial Administrations (SPA) and villages were out of the scope of loans and assistance, along with increasing urbanization in conjunction with rapid population growth that created more demand on funds. İller Bankası, including Special Provincial Administrations (SPA) and villages, was formally established on June 13, 1945, with Law No. 4759. İlbank's organizational status was then transformed to an incorporated company with the Law No. 6107 enacted on January 26, 2011.

== Organization ==
The shareholders of the company are municipalities and Provincial Special Agencies (İÖİ). The bank's board of directors consists of two bank deputy directors, four members appointed by the Ministry of Environment and Urban Planning, two by the Ministry of the Interior representing the municipalities and Provincial Special Agencies, and two mayors or members of Provincial Special Agencies, who were attendants of the bank's general assembly. In February 2014,the Banking Regulation and Supervision Agency (BDDK) approved the appointment of Mehmet Turgut Dedeoğlu as the director general of the bank.

== Sports ==
İlbank has a multi-branch sports club with the same title, consisting of taekwondo, volleyball. Its women's volleyball team İller Bankası Women's Volleyball plays in the Turkish Women's Volleyball League.
