= Madison Kingdon =

American indoor volleyball player (born 1993)

Madi Kingdon
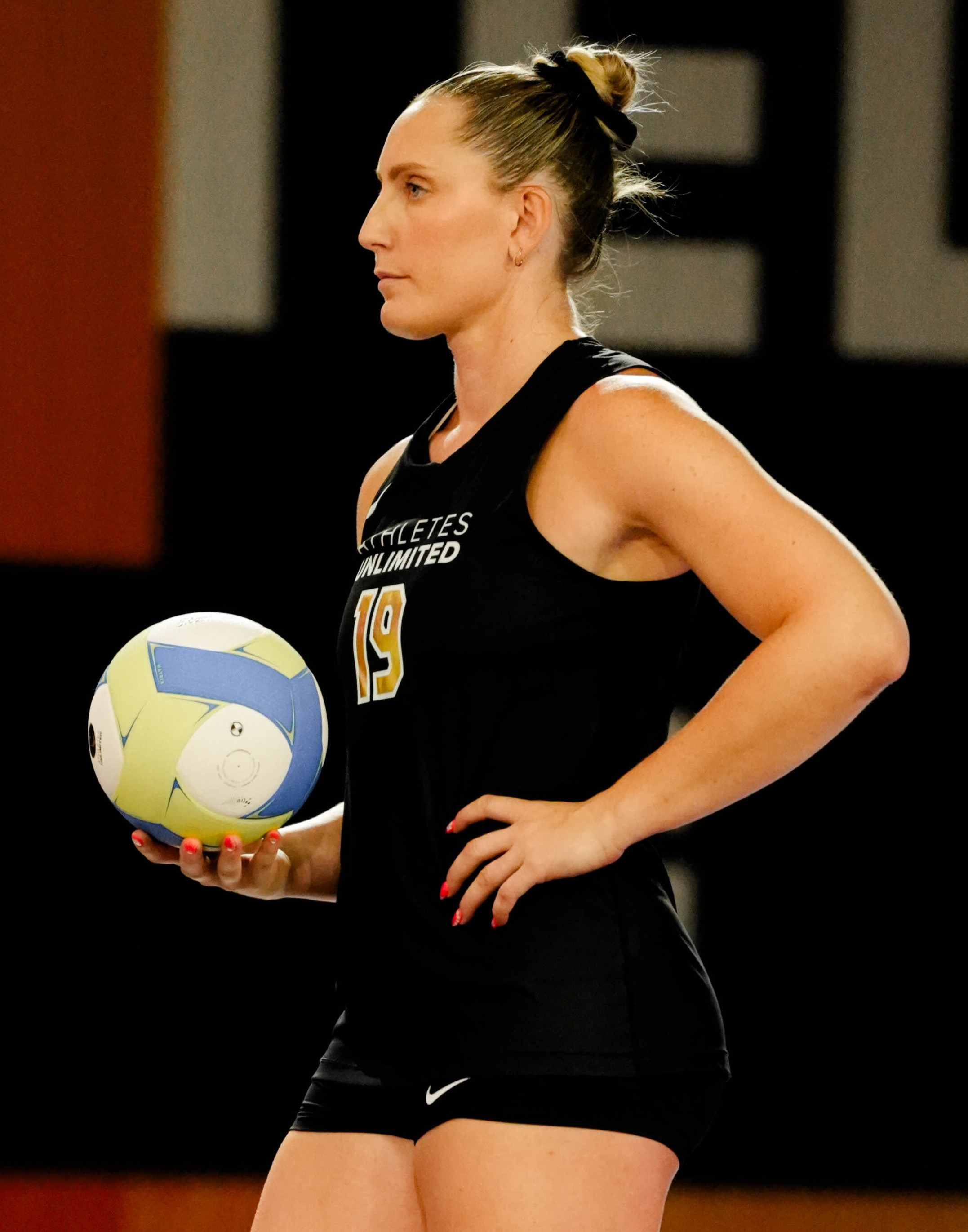

Personal information
- Full name: Madison Kingdon Rishel
- Nationality: American
- Born: April 20, 1993 (age 33)
- Hometown: Phoenix, Arizona, United States
- Height: 6 ft 1 in (1.85 m)
- Weight: 161 lb (73 kg)
- Spike: 120 in (310 cm)

Volleyball information
- Position: Outside hitter
- Current club: (United States) LOVB Houston
- Number: 9

Career
| Years | Teams |
|---|---|
| 2010–2014; 2015; 2016–2018; 2018-2019; 2019-2023; 2023-2024; 2024; 2024-Present | (United States) University of Arizona (Azerbaijan) Azerrail Baku (South Korea) Hwaseong IBK Altos (China) Beijing Baic Motor Club (Turkey) Türk Hava Yolları (Italy) Chieri '76 (Indonesia) Poposivo Polwan (United States) LOVB Houston |

National team
| 2016–Present | United States |
Medal Record
Women's volleyball
Representing the United States
World Grand Champions Cup
| Bronze medal – third place | 2017 Japan | Team |
FIVB Nations League
| Gold medal – first place | 2018 Nanjing | Team |
| Gold medal – first place | 2019 Nanjing | Team |
Pan-American Cup
| Bronze medal – third place | 2016 Santo Domingo |
| Gold medal – first place | 2017 Cañete/Lima |
| Gold medal – first place | 2019 Trujillo/Chiclayo |

Madi Kingdon (born April 20, 1993) is an American indoor volleyball player. She is a member of LOVB Pro. She attended the University of Arizona, where she received both AVCA Indoor and AVCA Sand All-American honors.

== High school ==
Kingdon attended Sunnyslope High School in Arizona, where she was a three-time Class 4A Division I champion. She was named to the Republic's All-Arizona team in both 2009 and 2010 and was selected for the A2 and USA Junior National teams. In 2010 she was named Gatorade Arizona Player of the Year, Arizona Republic's Player of the Year and Prepvolleyball.com All-American. Kingdon currently holds the record for most kills at Sunnyslope. In 2024, Kingdon was inducted into the Sunnyslope Hall of Fame. Kingdon was just the third athlete in Sunnyslope history to have their jersey number retired.

== College ==
Kingdon started her collegiate indoor volleyball career at the University of Arizona in 2011, and later competed in Arizona's Sand Volleyball program in the 2013 and 2014 seasons. She has one of the greatest indoor careers in Wildcat history ranking second in both career kills (1,943) and career digs (1,366). Kingdon led the team to three NCAA tournament appearances and two AVCA Sand Volleyball Pairs Championships. As a senior Kingdon was named AVCA All-American Third-Team and AVCA Sand Volleyball All-American. She was the only player in the country to receive All-American honors in both indoor and sand volleyball during the 2014–2015 season.

== Professional career ==
=== Azerrail Baku ===
Kingdon signed her first professional season with Azerrail Baku in the Azerbaijan Superleague in 2015. Azerrail was also a participant in the 2015-16 CEV DenizBank Volleyball Champions League. Azerrail finished the 2015-16 Azeri season with a record of 11-4 advancing to the Superleague finals where they defeated runner-up Telekom Baku for the championship title. Kingdon was named Azerbaijan Superleague MVP.

=== Hwaseong IBK Altos ===
Following her season with Azerrail, Kingdon was drafted sixth overall to Hwaseong IBK Altos for the 2016-17 Korean V-League season. The IBK Altos took home first place in the 2016 KOVO Cup and later defeated the Incheon Heungkuk Life Pink Spiders for the V-League championship title. Kingdon was named MVP of the V-League championships.

Kingdon re-signed with the Altos for the 2017–18 season. In a five-set win over Hyundai E&C Hillstate, Kingdon amassed 57 points with 52 kills, 22 digs and 47.3 kill percentage. This performance tied the Korean V-League record and is one point shy of the world record currently held by Azerbaijan's Polina Rahimova. The Altos finished the 2017-2018 regular season as runner-up to Gyeongbuk Gimcheon Hi-pass. In the V-League Championship tournament the Altos bested Hyundai E&C Hillstate 2 sets to 1 progressing to the final match against regular season winners Gyeongbuk Gimcheon Hi-pass. The Altos were defeated 3 matches to nil by Hi-pass ultimately taking the runner-up title.

=== Beijing Baic Motors Club ===
Kingdon competed for Beijing Baic Motor Women's Volleyball Club in 2018/19. She led the team through an undefeated preseason to solidify the team's position in Group A within the Chinese Volleyball Super League. After sweeping Shanghai Bright Ubest in the quarter final, Beijing proceeded to sweep Tianjin Bojai Bank to solidify the Chinese Super League Championship title.

=== Turk Hava Yolları ===
Kingdon was a member of the Türk Hava Yolları from 2019-2023. Founded in 2016, Türk Hava Yolları competes in the Sultans League, the First Division of the Turkish League, as well as CEV Champions Cup. In her four seasons with Türk Hava Yolları, she helped take the team to three semi-final appearances and a bronze medal victory in the 2020-2021 season

=== Reale Mutua Chieri '76 ===
Kingdon competed with Chieri '76 volleyball club during the 2023-2024 season, marking her first season in the Serie A1 Italian League. Kingdon led her team to the CEV Cup championship where they prevailed over Swiss Club Viteos Neuchatel to claim Chieri's first CEV Cup Gold.

=== League One Volleyball Pro (LOVB) ===
In 2024, Kingdon joined a star-studded roster in the inaugural LOVB Pro season, playing for LOVB Houston.

=== U.S. National Team ===
Kingdon debuted for the U.S. Women's National Team in the 2016 Pan American Cup where the U.S. took home a bronze medal. Kingdon was recognized as the 2016 Pan American Cup "Best spiker". In 2017 she again represented the U.S. in the Pan American Cup in Peru this time claiming a gold medal for Team USA. Kingdon was also a starting outside on the U.S. Women's National Team in each of the 2017 FIVB tournaments taking 5th in the FIVB World Grand Prix and claiming a bronze medal in the FIVB World Grand Champions Cup in Japan. Kingdon was named "Best outside spiker" during the FIVB World Grand Prix round in Macao, China. She represented Team USA during the USA Volleyball Cup vs. Brazil at the Anaheim Convention Center in Anaheim, CA.

In 2018, Kingdon was a part of the U.S. National Teams that took gold at the inaugural 2018 FIVB Volleyball Women's Nations League tournament. In 2019, Kingdon helped the U.S. team defend the Pan-American Cup and Nations League titles taking gold for the second and third year in a row respectively.

== Personal ==
Kingdon was born in Phoenix, Arizona to Martha and Russell Kingdon. She has one brother, Grant. She began playing indoor youth volleyball in 2005 for Arizona Storm. She is married to Paul Rishel.

== Awards ==
=== Individual ===
- 2016-17 Azerbaijan Superleague “Most Valuable Player”
- 2016 Pan American Cup “Best Spiker”
- 2016-17 V-League Championship “Most Valuable Player”
- 2017 FIVB World Grand Prix Macao "Best outside spiker"
- 2024 Indonesia Proliga "Best Spiker"
- 2024 Indonesia Proliga "Top Scorer"

=== Club ===
- 2015–16 Azerbaijan Superleague - Champion, with Azerrail Baku
- 2016 V-League KOVO Cup - Champion, with Hwaseong IBK Altos
- 2016–17 V-League - Champion, with Hwaseong IBK Altos
- 2017–18 V-League - Runner-up, with Hwaseong IBK Altos
- 2018–19 Chinese Super League - Champion, with Beijing Baic Motors
- 2020-21 Turkish Sultan League - Bronze Medal, with Türk Hava Yolları
- 2023-24 Serie A1 Italian League - Gold Cup, with Chieri '76 Volleyball
- 2024 Indonesian women's Proliga - Bronze Medal, with Jakarta Popsivo Polwan

=== College ===
- 2014 AVCA All-American Third Team
- 2015 AVCA Sand All-American
