= Kiera Van Ryk =

Canadian women's volleyball player

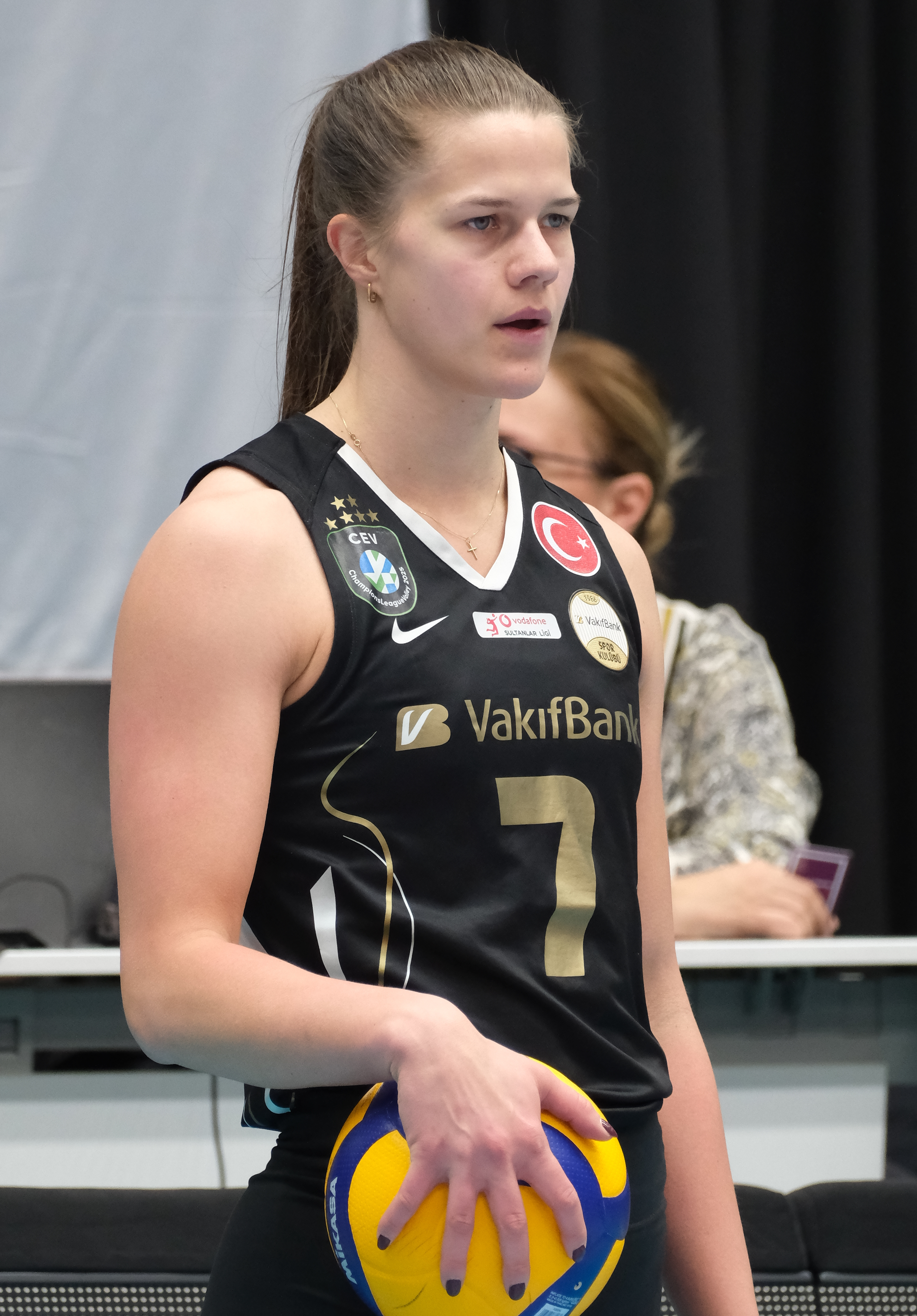
- Van Ryk in 2025

Personal information
- Nationality: Canadian
- Born: January 6, 1999 (age 27); New Westminster, British Columbia
- Hometown: Surrey, British Columbia
- Height: 1.88 m (6 ft 2 in)
- Spike: 302 cm (119 in)
- Block: 288 cm (113 in)
- Education: University of British Columbia

Volleyball information
- Position: Opposite hitter
- Current club: Savino del bene Scandicci
- Number: 3 (national team)

Career
Years	Teams
2017–2019; 2019–2020; 2020–2021; 2021–2024; 2024–2025; 2025-2026; 2026-	UBC Thunderbirds; Volley Bergamo; PGE Rysice Rzeszów; Türk Hava Yolları S.K. VakıfBank S.K. Shanghai Bright Ubest; Savino Del Bene Scandicci

National team
2015–	Canada
Honours
Women's volleyball
Representing Canada
NORCECA Championship
Gold medal – first place	2026 Santo Domingo	Team
Bronze medal – third place	2019 San Juan	Team
Bronze medal – third place	2021 Guadalajara	Team
Bronze medal – third place	2023 Quebec City	Team
- Last updated: 12 August 2024

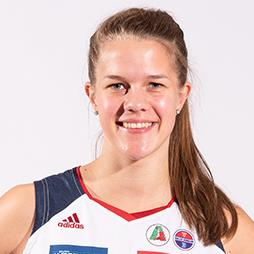
Van Ryk in 2019

Kiera Van Ryk (born January 6, 1999) is a Canadian volleyball player. She is part of the Canadian women's national volleyball team. She participated at the 2018 FIVB Volleyball Women's World Championship, 2018 Women's Pan-American Volleyball Cup, and 2019 FIVB Volleyball Women's Challenger Cup.

== University career ==
Van Ryk played two seasons of U Sports women's volleyball for the University of British Columbia Thunderbirds from 2017 to 2019. She finished her rookie season by winning a Bronze medal at the 2018 U Sports Women's Volleyball Championship. In her second year, she had an outstanding season as she won the Mary Lyons Award as the best U Sports women's volleyball player that year and won the Lieutenant Governor Athletic Award as the best female athlete in all of U Sports for the 2018–19 season. With the Thunderbirds that year, she won a national championship as the team won the 2019 U Sports Women's Volleyball Championship and Van Ryk was named the Tournament MVP.

== Professional career ==
Van Ryk left university to become a professional athlete by signing with Volley Bergamo of the Italian Women's Volleyball League Serie A1 in 2019. She left Volley Bergamo and returned to Canada in 2020 due to the COVID-19 pandemic. She then joined KS DevelopRes Rzeszów of the Tauron Liga for the 2020–21 season. For the 2021–22 season, she played for Türk Hava Yolları SK of the Turkish Women's Volleyball League.

Van Ryk joined Turkish club VakıfBank S.K. in 2024.

Van Ryk moved to China to play for Shanghai Bright Ubest where she won the league and was the best server.

Italian powerhouse Savino Del Bene Scandicci announced Van Ryk is part of their roster for the 2026/2027 season.

== Personal life ==
Van Ryk attended Surrey Christian School and has two older sisters, Jocelyn and Amy. She is also an avid dog lover.

== Exteneral links ==
- Kiera Van Ryk at Volleyball Canada
- Kiera Van Ryk at FIVB.com
- Kiera Van Ryk at the European Volleyball Confederation
- Kiera Van Ryk at Lega Pallavolo Serie A Femminile (in Italian)
- Kiera Van Ryk at Volleybox
