= Şeyma Ercan =

Turkish volleyball player (born 1994)

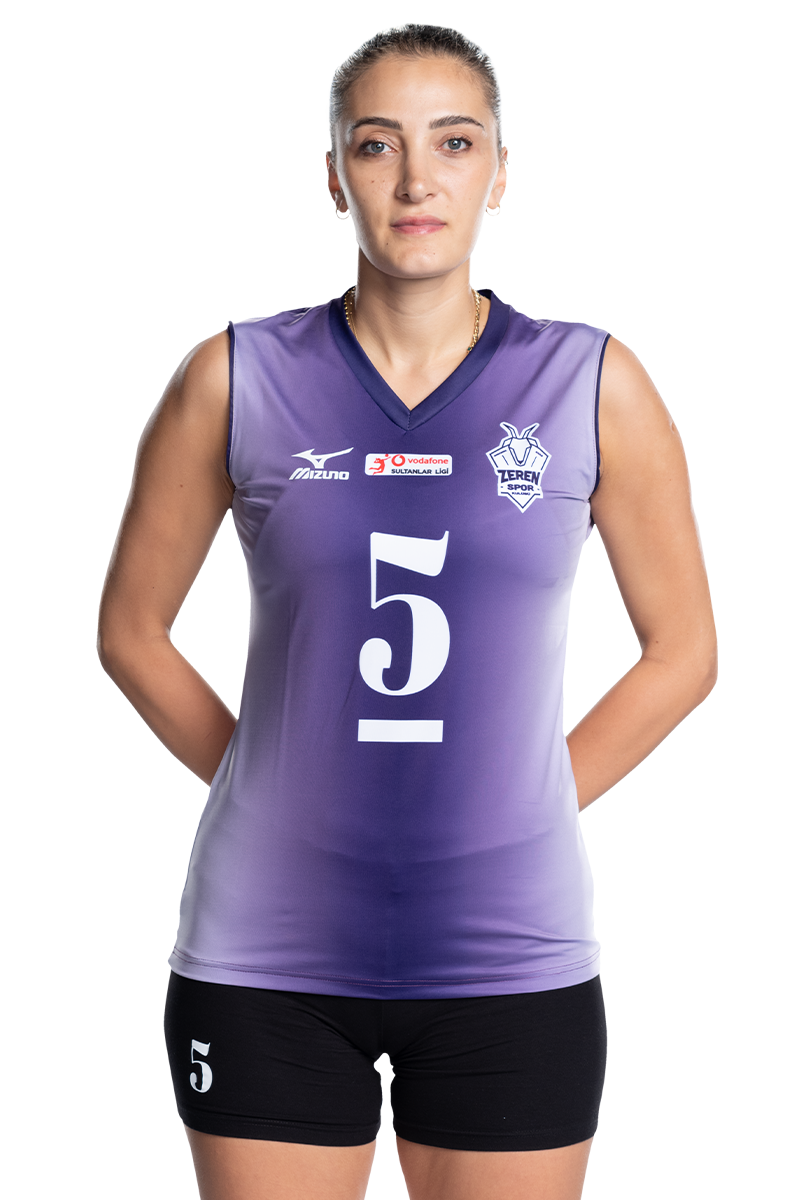

Personal information
- Born: 5 July 1994 (age 32) Ankara, Turkey
- Height: 1.86 m (6 ft 1 in)
- Weight: 69 kg (152 lb)
- Spike: 296 cm (117 in)
- Block: 290 cm (110 in)

Volleyball information
- Position: Wing spiker
- Current club: (Turkey) Türk Hava Yolları
- Number: 5

Career
- Years: Team
- 2009-2011: Gazi University
- 2011-2012: Beşiktaş
- 2012-2013: Bursa B.B.
- 2013-2015: Eczacıbaşı VitrA
- 2015-2017: Fenerbahçe Grundig
- 2017-2018: Beşiktaş
- 2018-Present: Türk Hava Yolları

National team
- Years: Team
- 2011: (Turkey) Girls' youth
- 2012-2013: (Turkey) Women's junior
- 2014-2021: (Turkey) Women's senior
Honours
Women's volleyball
Representing Turkey
European Championship
Silver medal – second place	2019 Turkey	Team
FIVB Nations League
Silver medal – second place	2018 Nanjing	Team
Bronze medal – third place	2021 Rimini	Team
Women's U23 World Championship
Silver medal – second place	2015 Ankara	Team
Women's Junior European Championship
Gold medal – first place	2012 Ankara	Team
Girls Youth World Championship
Gold medal – first place	2011 Ankara	Team
Girls Youth European Championship
Gold medal – first place	2011 Ankara	Team

Şeyma Ercan (born 5 July 1994 in Ankara, Turkey) is a Turkish volleyball player who plays for Türk Hava Yolları. She is 186 cm (6.10 ft) tall at 69 kg (152 lb) and plays in the wing spiker position. Şeyma began playing volleyball in 2005 at Gazi University's Sport Club in her hometown. She was encouraged by coach Elif Öz. She is a member of the Turkey women's youth national volleyball team, and wears number 5. In 2009, at the age of only 15, she became a member of the A-team, which played in the Turkish Women's Volleyball Second League. She transferred to Beşiktaş Women's Volleyball Team in Istanbul in the 2011-2012 season. In September 2012, she signed a three-year contract with Eczacıbaşı VitrA, which then loaned her out for one year to Bursa Büyükşehir Belediyespor. She spent next two years at Eczacıbaşı VitrA. In 2015, she transferred to Fenerbahçe Grundig Women's Volleyball Team. Şeyma Ercan debuted in the girls' youth national team in 2011 playing at the 2011 CEV Girls Youth Volleyball European Championship, where her team won the gold medal and she was honored with the Best Server title. She won the 2012 Women's Junior European Volleyball Championship with the national team.

== Clubs ==
- (Turkey) Gazi University (2009-2011)
- (Turkey) Beşiktaş (2011-2012)
- (Turkey) Bursa Büyükşehir Belediyespor (2012-2013)
- (Turkey) Eczacıbaşı VitrA (2013-2015)
- (Turkey) Fenerbahçe Grundig (2015-2017)
- (Turkey) Beşiktaş (2017-2018)
- (Turkey) Türk Hava Yolları (2018-...)

== Awards ==
=== Individual ===
- 2011 CEV Girls Youth Volleyball European Championship - Best Server

=== National team ===
- 2011 CEV Girls Youth Volleyball European Championship - Gold
- 2011 FIVB Girls Youth World Championship - Gold
- 2012 Women's Junior European Volleyball Championship - Gold
- 2015 FIVB Volleyball Women's U23 World Championship - Silver
- 2018 Nations League - Silver Medal
- 2019 European Championship - Silver Medal
- 2021 Nations League - Bronze Medal

== See also ==
- Turkish women in sports
