= Melis Yılmaz =

Turkish volleyball player (born 1997)

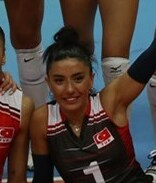
- Melis Yılmaz in 2021

Personal information
- Full name: Melis Yılmaz
- Born: 28 June 1997 (age 29); Istanbul, Turkey
- Height: 1.67 m (5 ft 5 1/2 in)
- Spike: 257 cm (101 in)
- Block: 245 cm (96 in)

Volleyball information
- Position: Libero
- Current club: Türk Hava Yolları SK
- Number: 1

National team
Turkey
Honours
Women's volleyball
Representing Turkey
FIVB Nations League
Gold medal – first place	2026 Macau	Team
Islamic Solidarity Games
Gold medal – first place	2021 Konya	Team

Melis Yılmaz (born 28 June 1997) is a Turkish volleyball player. She is 167 cm tall and plays as a libero. She played in the 2017 CEV Volleyball European Championship.

She has come through the youth setup of Fenerbahçe and has played since 2010.

She played for Aydın Büyükşehir Belediyespor, and Türk Hava Yolları SK.

== Honours ==
- 2014–15 Turkish Volleyball Cup – Champion, with Fenerbahçe Grundig
- 2014–15 Turkish Women's Volleyball League – Champion, with Fenerbahçe Grundig
- 2016–17 Turkish Volleyball Cup – Champion, with Fenerbahçe Grundig
- 2016–17 Turkish Volleyball League – Champion, with Fenerbahçe Grundig
