= Gréta Szakmáry =

Hungarian volleyball player (born 1991)

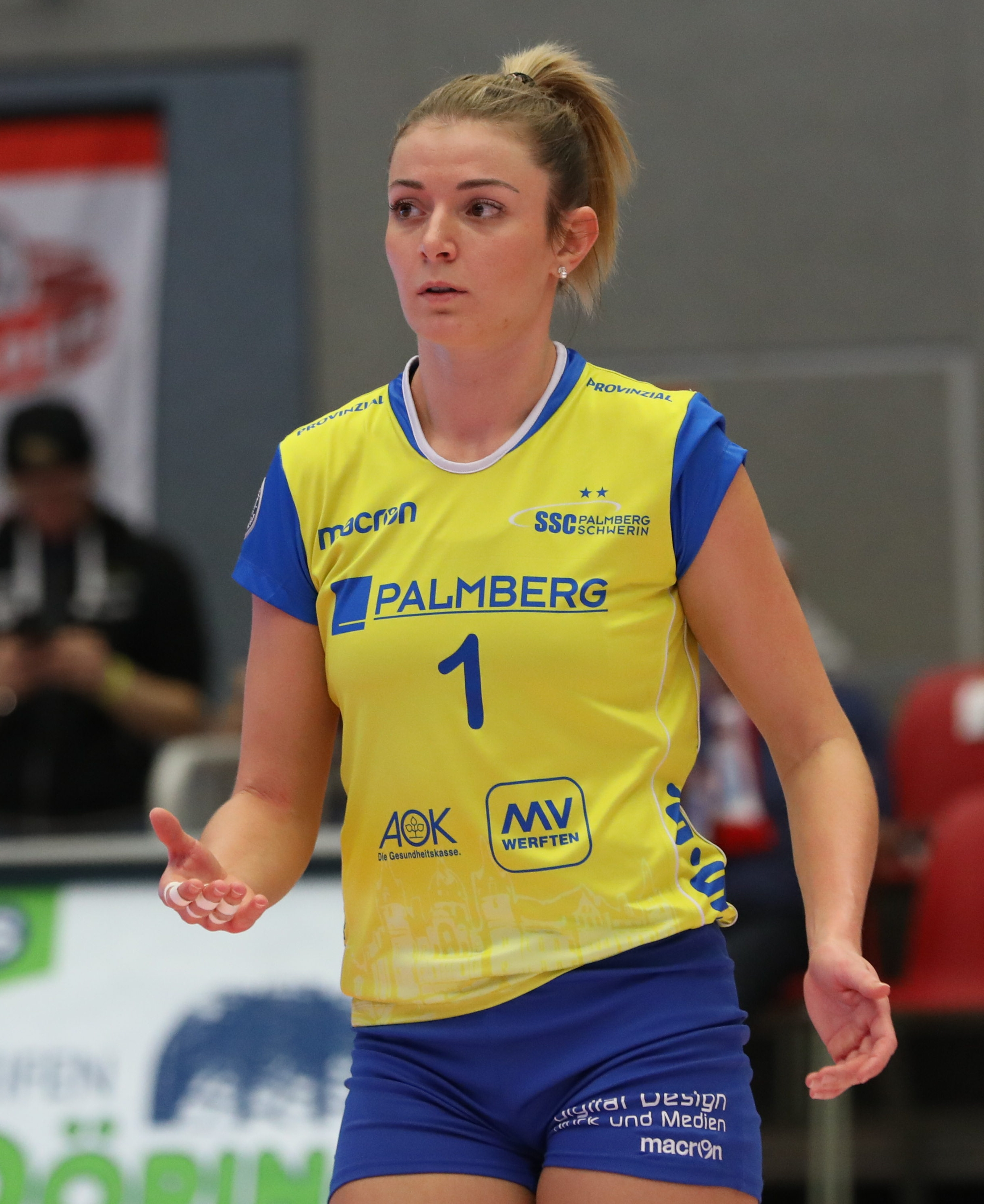

Personal information
- Nationality: Hungarian
- Born: 31 December 1991 (age 34); Nyíregyháza, Hungary
- Hometown: Nyíregyháza, Hungary
- Height: 186 cm (6 ft 1 in)
- Weight: 71 kg (157 lb)
- Spike: 301 cm (119 in)
- Block: 280 cm (110 in)

Volleyball information
- Position: Outside Hitter
- Current club: (Japan) Hisamitsu Springs
- Number: 6

Career
Years	Teams
2007–2010	(Hungary) Betonut-NRK Nyiregyhaza
2010–2015	(Hungary) TEVA-Gödöllõi RC
2015–2017	(Hungary) Linamar-Bekescsabai RSE
2017-2021	(Germany) SSC Palmberg Schwerin
2021	(Turkey) Aydın Büyükşehir Belediyespor
2022	(Italy) Cuneo Granda San Bernardo
2023	(Italy) Igor Gorgonzola Novara
2024-	(Japan) Hisamitsu Springs

National team
2012-	Hungary (85)

Gréta Szakmáry (born 31 December 1991) is a Hungarian volleyball player, playing as an outside-spiker. She is part of the Hungary women's national volleyball team.

She competed at the 2015 Women's European Volleyball Championship, 2017 Women's European Volleyball Championship, and 2017 FIVB Volleyball World Grand Prix.

On club level she played for Betonut-NRK Nyiregyhaza, TEVA-Gödöllõ Club, Linamar-Bekescsabai RSE. Then played internationally for SSC Palmberg Schwerin, Aydın Büyükşehir Belediyespor, Cuneo Granda San Bernardo, and currently is playing for Saga Hisamitsu Springs.
