= Daly Santana =

Puerto Rican volleyball player (born 1995)

Personal information
- Full name: Daly Santana Morales
- Nationality: Puerto Rican/ Dominican
- Born: February 19, 1995 (age 31); Corozal, Puerto Rico
- Height: 185 cm (6 ft 1 in)
- Weight: 65 kg (143 lb)
- Spike: 300 cm (118 in)
- Block: 274 cm (108 in)
- Education: Minnesota

Volleyball information
- Position: Wing spiker
- Current club: LOVB Madison
- Number: 1

Career
Years	Teams
2010–2011	Llaneras de Toa Baja
2015–2016	Capitalinas de San Juan
2016–2017	ASPTT Mulhouse
2017–2020	Il Bisonte Firenze
2020–2021	Türk Hava Yolları
2021	Pinkin de Corozal
2021–2023	Hwaseong IBK Altos
2023–2024	PFU Blue Cats
2024	Pinkin de Corozal
2024–present	LOVB Madison

National team
2011–	Puerto Rico
Medal record
Women's volleyball
Representing Puerto Rico
Pan-American Cup
Bronze medal – third place	2017 Cañete
Silver medal – second place	2016 Santo Domingo
Girls' Youth NORCECA Championship
Bronze medal – third place	2010 Guatemala

Daly Santana Morales (born February 19, 1995) is a Puerto Rican indoor volleyball player. She is a 1.85 m (6 ft 1 in) outside hitter. She is part of the Puerto Rican national team since 2011. At the age of 21, she competed at the 2016 Summer Olympics.

== Early life ==
Santana has said that volleyball stopped being just a game for her at the age of 11, when she made Puerto Rico's under-18 national team. In 2010, she led the team to the bronze medal at the NORCECA Girls’ Youth Volleyball Tournament. In 2011, she captained the team at the 2011 FIVB Volleyball Girls' Youth World Championship in Turkey.

In 2011, as a 16 year old, Santana split time between homework, the Bayamon Military Academy high school volleyball team, and the Llaneras de Toa Baja, a professional team in the LVSF. In 2011, she made her debut with Puerto Rico's senior national team when she played at the 2011 Pan American Games in Guadalajara, Mexico.

== College career ==
In 2012, Santana began playing NCAA Division I volleyball, joining the Minnesota Gophers of the Big Ten as a freshman. Despite major lifestyle adjustments, the language barrier, and making her college debut in one of the toughest conferences in the nation, Santana's freshman season was a successful one, her performance earning her a unanimous selection to the Freshman All-Big Ten team. Her 56 service aces that year led the Gophers, ranked 3rd in the Big Ten, and 5th nationally. The Gophers reached the Regional Finals of the 2012 NCAA Division I women's volleyball tournament, and Santana was named to the NCAA All-Tournament Team.

In 2014, Santana was an AVCA All-America honorable mention. That year, she was joined at Minnesota by a former teammate in the Puerto Rico Youth National Team, libero Dalianliz Rosado. The path shared by the two to arrive on campus and their common heritage were both catalysts in making the pair bond productively and help each other stay focused, specially after a disappointing 2014 that saw the team miss the NCAA tournament for the first time since 1998 and finish the year with a losing record in one of the most competitive conferences in the nation.

In 2015, it all came together for Santana and the Gophers. After a shaky 1–2 start, the Gophers won their second Big Ten Conference championship in program history and headed back to the NCAA Tournament with a 26–4 record and the top seed in their region, earning coach Hugh McCutcheon both the 2015 Big Ten Coach of the Year award and the AVCA Coach of the Year award at the national level. They reached the NCAA Final Four for the fourth time in program history, where they lost to the Texas Longhorns. Santana truly established herself as one of the premier players in NCAA Division I volleyball, earning the 2015 Big Ten Player of the Year award after leading the conference with 4.53 kills per set. She led the Gophers in kills (584), points (654.5), and service aces (39), was second in digs (375), and was twice named Big Ten Player of the Week. She was a unanimous All-Big Ten selection. Her 39 kills in a 5-set match against Louisville on September 4, 2015 were the most by any NCAA Division I player that year. Along with teammate Hannah Tapp, Santana earned 2015 AVCA First-Team All-America honors. When she reached the end of her college career, Santana's 1644 points, 182 service aces, and 1280 digs respectively ranked 7th, 8th, and 10th in program history. Santana was named as one of the four finalists for the Honda Sports Award in volleyball.

She graduated in May 2016 with a major in youth studies. She has said she is interested in pursuing a career in criminal justice.

== Career ==
Santana is a member of the Puerto Rican national team since 2014. In 2016, Santana reentered Puerto Rico's Liga de Voleibol Superior Femenino (LVSF) after a 5-year hiatus. Her LVSF team, the San Juan Capitalinas, itself was making a comeback to the league after a decade-long absence. The return was triumphant for both player and team. The Capitalinas reached their first LVSF Finals since 1992, and Santana emerged as one of the leading lights of the LVSF, earning both the Most Improved Player and Most Valuable Player awards as well as receiving the most votes to the All-LVSF team.

== Clubs ==
- (Puerto Rico) Llaneras de Toa Baja (2010–2011)
- (Puerto Rico) Capitalinas de San Juan (2015–2016)
- (France) ASPTT Mulhouse (2016–2017)
- (Italy) Il Bisonte Firenze (2017–2020)
- (Turkey) Türk Hava Yolları (2020–2021)
- (Puerto Rico) Pinkin de Corozal (2020–2021)
- (South Korea) Hwaseong IBK Altos (2021–2023)
- (Japan) PFU BlueCats (2023–2024)
- (Puerto Rico) Pinkin de Corozal (2024)
- (United States) LOVB Madison (2024–present)

== Awards ==
=== College ===
- 2012 Freshman All-Big Ten team
- 2012 NCAA "All-Tournament team"
- 2014 AVCA "All-America honorable mention"
- 2015 All-Big Ten team
- 2015 Big Ten "Player of the Year"
- 2015 AVCA "First-Team All-America"
- 2016 Finalist for Honda Sports Award

=== Individuals ===
- 2013 Women's Junior Pan-American Volleyball Cup – Best Server
- 2016 LVSF – Most Improved Player
- 2016 LVSF – Most Valuable Player
- 2016 All-LVSF team
- 2016–17 Ligue AF – Most Valuable Player

=== Clubs ===
- 2016–17 Ligue AF – Champion, with ASPTT Mulhouse
