= İlker Aycı =

Turkish businessperson

Mehmet İlker Aycı
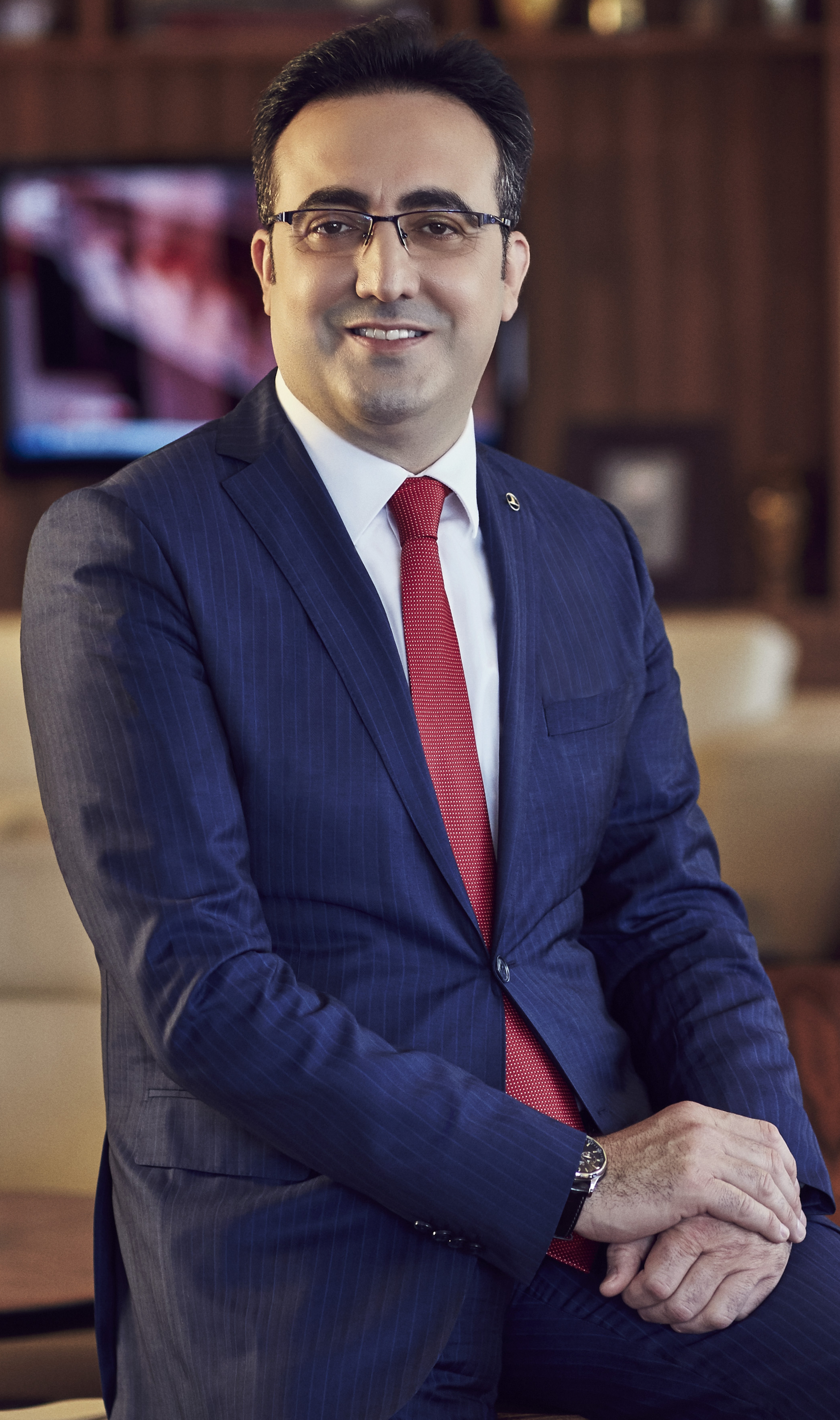
- Born: 1971 (age 54–55)
- Occupation: Board Member of Oman Air

Mehmet İlker Aycı (born 1971, Istanbul) is a Turkish businessperson. Aycı was the advisor of Recep Tayyip Erdoğan in 1994 and was the CEO of several Turkish companies before becoming the chairman of Turkish Airlines from 2015 to 2022. He has been a board member of Oman Air since April 2024.

== Early and personal life ==
İlker Aycı graduated from the Department of Political Science and Public Administration at Bilkent University before continuing his education at the Department of Political Science at the University of Leeds as a researcher. For a period starting from 1994, Aycı was the advisor of Recep Tayyip Erdoğan, then mayor of Istanbul.

On 19 November 2018, Aycı married lawyer and sports commentator Tuğçe Saatman, where president Recep Tayyip Erdoğan acted as one of the wedding witnesses. Aycı speaks Turkish, English and Russian fluently.

== Career ==
Aycı held several positions in the Istanbul Metropolitan Municipality and was the CEO of several insurance companies from 2005 to 2011. In January 2011, he was appointed as the President of the Prime Ministry Investment Support and Promotion Agency of Turkey.

In February 2013, Aycı was appointed as the vice president of the World Association of Investment Promotion Agencies, and was promoted in January 2014 to be the chairman. He held this position until 2015.

Aycı was an executive board member of Turkish Airlines until April 2015, when he was appointed chairman, replacing Hamdi Topçu.

In January 2022, Aycı resigned as chairman of Turkish Airlines. During the board meeting the next day, Ahmet Bolat was appointed to replace him. Aycı held 14 to 17 positions at the same time in the airline and in its subsidiaries.

In February 2022, less than three weeks after his departure from Turkish Airlines, Aycı was appointed by Tata Group to become the new CEO and managing director of Air India. He was due to take on the positions on 1 April, however in 1 March, Aycı announced that he had declined the offer due to widespread criticism in India.

== Honors ==
- Order of the Rising Sun, 3rd Class, Gold Rays with Neck Ribbon (2021)
