= Nilüfer Belediyespor =

Multi-sports club in Nilüfer district of Bursa Province, Turkey

- Full name: Nilüfer Belediye Spor Kulübü
- Founded: 1999
- Ground: Nilüfer Stadı, Bursa
- Capacity: 2.000
- League: TFF Third League
Home colours	Away colours

Nilüfer Belediyespor is a multi-sports club in the Nilüfer district of Bursa Province, Turkey. The club's most prominent sections are football, men's handball, and women's volleyball.
