= October 31 =

October 31 this year in various calendars
- Saturday, 31 October 2026
Akan	Monomemene
Armenian	13 Trē 1476
Aztec	Atlcahualo 9, 9 Ehēcatl
Babylonian	18 Tashritu, 2337 SE
Balinese pawukon	Menga, Kajeng, Menala, Umanis, Maulu, Saniscara of Watugunung, Uma, Dadi, Sri
Bengali	15 Kartik, BS 1433
Chinese	Yang Earth Tiger・Stomach Mansion; Fire Horse Year, Month 9, Day 22 (Shuangjiang, 7 days until Lidong)
Common Era	31 October 2026 CE
Coptic	21 Paopi, AM 1743
Egyptian	18 Phamenoth, 2775 NE
Ethiopian	21 Ṭeqemt, 2019 Amätä Məhrät
French Republican	Décade I, Nonidi de Brumaire de l'Année 235 de la République
Gregorian	31 October, AD 2026
Hebrew	20 Cheshvan, AM 5787
Hindu	Ārdrā・Śiva; Solar: 14 Kārtika, 1948 SE; Lunisolar: Ṣaṣṭhī, Kṛishna pakṣa of Āśvina, 2083 VE; Rāudra・5127 KY・1,872,879
Icelandic	Laugardagur, 8 Gormánuður 2026
Islamic	19 Jumada al-awwal, AH 1448 (using tabular method)
ISO week date	2026-W44-6
Japanese	21 Nagatsuki, Reiwa 8 (Sōkō, 7 days until Rittō)
Julian	18 October, AD 2026 (AM 7535)
Julian day	2461345
Korean	21 Gaedal, 4359 DE
Maya	13.0.14.1.2; 15 Zac, 9 Ik
Roman	ante diem XV Kalendas Novembres, MMDCCLXXIX AUC
Solar Hijri	9 Aban, SH 1405
Tibetan	21 tha skar, me pho rta 2153 or 1772 or 1000

<<	October					>>
Su	Mo	Tu	We	Th	Fr	Sa
				1	2	3
4	5	6	7	8	9	10
11	12	13	14	15	16	17
18	19	20	21	22	23	24
25	26	27	28	29	30	31
2026

October 31 in recent years
2026 (Saturday)
2025 (Friday)
2024 (Thursday)
2023 (Tuesday)
2022 (Monday)
2021 (Sunday)
2020 (Saturday)
2019 (Thursday)
2018 (Wednesday)
2017 (Tuesday)

October 31 is the 304th day of the year (305th in leap years) in the Gregorian calendar; 61 days remain until the end of the year.

== Events ==
=== Pre-1600 ===
- 475 – Romulus Augustulus is proclaimed Western Roman Emperor.
- 649 – The Lateran Council of 649 comes to a close, which condemns Monotheletism.
- 683 – During the Siege of Mecca, the Kaaba catches fire and is burned down.
- 802 – Empress Irene is deposed and banished to Lesbos. Conspirators place Nikephoros, the minister of finance, on the Byzantine throne.
- 932 – Abbasid caliph al-Muqtadir is killed while fighting against the forces of general Mu'nis al-Muzaffar. Al-Muqtadir's brother al-Qahir is chosen to succeed him.
- 1517 – Protestant Reformation: Martin Luther posts his 95 Theses on the door of the Castle Church in Wittenberg.
- 1587 – Leiden University Library opens its doors after its founding in 1575.

=== 1601–1900 ===
- 1702 – Anglo-Dutch forces, under the Duke of Marlborough and Earl of Athlone, capture Liège during the War of the Spanish Succession.
- 1812 – Russian forces under Pyotr Kotlyarevsky defeat a larger Iranian force under Fath-Ali Shah in the battle of Aslanduz.
- 1822 – Emperor Agustín de Iturbide attempts to dissolve the Congress of the Mexican Empire.
- 1837 – Approximately 300 Muscogee die in the steamboat Monmouth disaster on the Trail of Tears in the United States.
- 1863 – The New Zealand Wars resume as British forces in New Zealand led by General Duncan Cameron begin their Invasion of the Waikato.
- 1864 – Nevada is admitted as the 36th U.S. state.
- 1895 – The strongest earthquake in the Midwestern United States since 1812 strikes near Charleston, Missouri, causing damage and killing at least two.

=== 1901–present ===
- 1903 – The Purdue Wreck, a railroad train collision in Indianapolis, kills 17 people, including 14 players of the Purdue University football team.
- 1907 – The Parliament of Finland approved the Prohibition Act, but the law was not implemented because it was not ratified by Tsar Nicholas II of Russia.
- 1913 – Dedication of the Lincoln Highway, the first automobile highway across United States.
- 1913 – The Indianapolis Streetcar Strike and subsequent riot begins.
- 1917 – World War I: Battle of Beersheba: The "last successful cavalry charge in history".
- 1918 – World War I: The Aster Revolution terminates the Austro-Hungarian Compromise of 1867, and Hungary achieves full sovereignty.
- 1922 – Benito Mussolini is made Prime Minister of Italy.
- 1923 – The first of 160 consecutive days of 100° Fahrenheit at Marble Bar, Western Australia.
- 1924 – World Savings Day is announced in Milan, Italy by the Members of the Association at the 1st International Savings Bank Congress (World Society of Savings Banks).
- 1938 – Great Depression: In an effort to restore investor confidence, the New York Stock Exchange unveils a fifteen-point program aimed to upgrade protection for the investing public.
- 1940 – World War II: The Battle of Britain ends, causing Germany to abandon Operation Sea Lion.
- 1941 – After 14 years of work, Mount Rushmore is completed.
- 1941 – World War II: The destroyer USS Reuben James is torpedoed by a German U-boat near Iceland, killing more than 100 U.S. Navy sailors. It is the first U.S. Navy vessel sunk by enemy action in WWII.
- 1943 – World War II: An F4U Corsair accomplishes the first successful radar-guided interception by a United States Navy or Marine Corps aircraft.
- 1956 – Suez Crisis: The United Kingdom and France begin bombing Egypt to force the reopening of the Suez Canal.
- 1956 – Hungarian Revolution of 1956: A Revolutionary Headquarters is established in Hungary. Following Imre Nagy's announcement of October 30, banned non-Communist political parties are reformed, and the MDP is replaced by the MSZMP. József Mindszenty is released from prison. The Soviet Politburo makes the decision to crush the Revolution.
- 1961 – In the Soviet Union, Joseph Stalin's body is removed from Lenin's Mausoleum, and is buried near the Kremlin Wall under a plain white marker.
- 1963 – Indiana State Fairgrounds Coliseum gas explosion: A gas explosion at the Indiana State Fairgrounds Coliseum in Indianapolis kills 81 people and injures another 400 during an ice show.
- 1968 – Vietnam War October surprise: Citing progress with the Paris peace talks, US President Lyndon B. Johnson announces to the nation that he has ordered a complete cessation of "all air, naval, and artillery bombardment of North Vietnam" effective November 1.
- 1968 – Great Drought of 1968: Amidst a collapse of hydropower President of Chile Eduardo Frei Montalva decrees the establishment of daylight saving time.
- 1973 – Three Provisional Irish Republican Army members escape from Mountjoy Prison, Dublin aboard a hijacked helicopter that landed in the exercise yard.
- 1979 – Western Airlines Flight 2605 crashes on landing in Mexico City, killing 73 people.
- 1984 – Indian Prime Minister Indira Gandhi is assassinated by two Sikh security guards. Riots break out in New Delhi and other cities and around 3,000 Sikhs are killed.
- 1994 – American Eagle Flight 4184 crashes near Roselawn, Indiana killing all 68 people on board.
- 1996 – TAM Transportes Aéreos Regionais Flight 402 crashes in São Paulo, Brazil, killing 99 people.
- 1998 – Iraq disarmament crisis begins: Iraq announces it would no longer cooperate with United Nations weapons inspectors.
- 1999 – Yachtsman Jesse Martin returns to Melbourne after 11 months of circumnavigating the world, solo, non-stop and unassisted.
- 1999 – EgyptAir Flight 990 crashes into the Atlantic Ocean near Nantucket, killing all 217 people on board.
- 2000 – Soyuz TM-31 launches, carrying the first resident crew to the International Space Station. The ISS has been crewed continuously since then.
- 2000 – Singapore Airlines Flight 006 crashes on takeoff from Taipei, killing 83.
- 2002 – A federal grand jury in Houston, Texas indicts former Enron chief financial officer Andrew Fastow on 78 counts of wire fraud, money laundering, conspiracy and obstruction of justice related to the collapse of his ex-employer.
- 2003 – Mahathir Mohamad resigns as Prime Minister of Malaysia and is replaced by Deputy Prime Minister Abdullah Ahmad Badawi, marking an end to Mahathir's 22 years in power.
- 2011 – The global population of humans reaches seven billion. This day is now recognized by the United Nations as the Day of Seven Billion.
- 2014 – During a test flight, the VSS Enterprise, a Virgin Galactic experimental spaceflight test vehicle, suffers a catastrophic in-flight breakup and crashes in the Mojave Desert, California.
- 2015 – Metrojet Flight 9268 is bombed over the northern Sinai Peninsula, killing all 224 people on board.
- 2017 – A truck drives into a crowd in Lower Manhattan, New York City, killing eight people.
- 2020 – Berlin Brandenburg Airport opens its doors after nearly 10 years of delays due to construction issues and project corruption.

== Births ==
=== Pre-1600 ===
- 1345 – Ferdinand I, king of Portugal (died 1383)
- 1391 – Edward, King of Portugal (died 1438)
- 1424 – Władysław III, king of Poland (died 1444)
- 1445 – Hedwig, Abbess of Quedlinburg, Princess-Abbess of Quedlinburg (died 1511)
- 1472 – Wang Yangming, Chinese Neo-Confucian scholar (died 1529)
- 1542 – Henriette of Cleves, Duchess of Nevers, Countess of Rethel (died 1601)
- 1599 – Denzil Holles, 1st Baron Holles, English politician (died 1680)

=== 1601–1900 ===
- 1620 – John Evelyn, English gardener and author (died 1706)
- 1632 – Johannes Vermeer, Dutch painter (died 1675)
- 1636 – Ferdinand Maria, Elector of Bavaria (died 1679)
- 1638 – Meindert Hobbema, Dutch painter (died 1709)
- 1686 – Senesino, Italian singer and actor (died 1758)
- 1692 – Anne Claude de Caylus, French archaeologist and author (died 1765)
- 1694 – Yeongjo of Joseon (died 1776)
- 1705 – Pope Clement XIV (died 1774)
- 1711 – Laura Bassi, Italian physician, physicist, and academic (died 1778)
- 1714 – Hedvig Taube, Swedish courtier (died 1744)
- 1724 – Christopher Anstey, English author and poet (died 1805)
- 1729 – Alonso Núñez de Haro y Peralta, Spanish cleric, Archbishop of Mexico, Viceroy of New Spain (died 1800)
- 1737 – James Lovell, American educator and politician (died 1789)
- 1760 – Katsushika Hokusai, Japanese artist and printmaker (died 1849)
- 1795 – John Keats, English poet (died 1821)
- 1809 – Edmund Sharpe, English architect, architectural historian, railway engineer, and sanitary reformer (died 1877)
- 1815 – Thomas Chapman, English-Australian politician, 5th Premier of Tasmania (died 1884)
- 1815 – Karl Weierstrass, German mathematician and academic (died 1897)
- 1825 – Charles Lavigerie, French-Algerian cardinal and academic (died 1892)
- 1831 – Paolo Mantegazza, Italian neurologist, physiologist, and anthropologist (died 1910)
- 1835 – Adelbert Ames, American general and politician, 27th Governor of Mississippi (died 1933)
- 1835 – Krišjānis Barons, Latvian linguist and author (died 1923)
- 1835 – Adolf von Baeyer, German chemist and academic, Nobel Prize laureate (died 1917)
- 1838 – Luís I of Portugal (died 1889)
- 1847 – Galileo Ferraris, Italian physicist and engineer (died 1897)
- 1848 – Boston Custer, American soldier (died 1876)
- 1849 – Marie Louise Andrews, American story writer and journalist (died 1891)
- 1851 – Louise of Sweden (died 1926)
- 1856 – Charles Leroux, American balloonist and skydiver (died 1889)
- 1858 – Saint Geevarghese Mar Dionysius of Vattasseril, Indian Orthodox Saint (died 1934)
- 1860 – Juliette Gordon Low, American scout leader, founded the Girl Scouts of the United States of America (died 1927)
- 1860 – Andrew Volstead, American politician (died 1947)
- 1868 – John Weir Troy, American journalist, and politician, 5th Governor of the Territory of Alaska (died 1942)
- 1875 – Eugene Meyer, American businessman and publisher (died 1954)
- 1875 – Vallabhbhai Patel, Indian lawyer, freedom fighter and politician, 1st Deputy Prime Minister of India (died 1950)
- 1876 – Natalie Clifford Barney, American poet and playwright (died 1972)
- 1879 – Karel Hašler, Czech actor, director, and composer (died 1941)
- 1880 – Julia Peterkin, American author (died 1961)
- 1880 – Mikhail Tomsky, Soviet politician, member of the Politburo of the Central Committee of the Communist Party of the Soviet Union (died 1936)
- 1881 – Toshizō Nishio, Japanese general (died 1960)
- 1883 – Marie Laurencin, French painter and illustrator (died 1956)
- 1883 – Anthony Wilding, New Zealand tennis player, cricketer, and soldier (died 1915)
- 1887 – Chiang Kai-shek, Chinese general and politician, 1st President of the Republic of China (died 1975)
- 1887 – Newsy Lalonde, Canadian ice hockey player and lacrosse player (died 1970)
- 1888 – Napoleon Lapathiotis, Greek poet and author (died 1944)
- 1892 – Alexander Alekhine, Russian chess player and author (died 1946)
- 1895 – B. H. Liddell Hart, English soldier, historian, and theorist (died 1970)
- 1896 – Ethel Waters, American singer and actress (died 1977)
- 1897 – Constance Savery, English author (died 1999)
- 1900 – Asbjørg Borgfelt, Norwegian sculptor (died 1976)

=== 1901–present ===
- 1902 – Carlos Drummond de Andrade, Brazilian poet (died 1987)
- 1902 – Julia Lee, American blues singer-songwriter and pianist (died 1958)
- 1902 – Abraham Wald, Jewish-Hungarian mathematician and economist (died 1950)
- 1907 – Edgar Sampson, American musician and composer (died 1973)
- 1908 – Muriel Duckworth, Canadian activist (died 2009)
- 1912 – Dale Evans, American singer-songwriter and actress (died 2001)
- 1912 – Ollie Johnston, American animator and voice actor (died 2008)
- 1914 – John Hugenholtz, Dutch engineer and designer (died 1995)
- 1915 – Jane Jarvis, American pianist and composer (died 2010)
- 1916 – Count Carl Johan Bernadotte of Wisborg (died 2012)
- 1917 – William H. McNeill, Canadian-American historian and author (died 2016)
- 1917 – Gordon Steege, Australian soldier and pilot (died 2013)
- 1918 – Ian Stevenson, American psychiatrist and academic (died 2007)
- 1919 – Daphne Oxenford, English actress (died 2012)
- 1919 – Magnus Wenninger, American mathematician and author (died 2017)
- 1920 – Dick Francis, Welsh-Caymanian jockey and author (died 2010)
- 1920 – Joseph Gelineau, French priest and composer (died 2008)
- 1920 – Helmut Newton, German-Australian photographer (died 2004)
- 1920 – Fritz Walter, German footballer (died 2002)
- 1922 – Barbara Bel Geddes, American actress (died 2005)
- 1922 – Illinois Jacquet, American saxophonist and composer (died 2004)
- 1922 – Norodom Sihanouk, Cambodian politician, 1st Prime Minister of Cambodia (died 2012)
- 1925 – Lawrence A. Cremin, American historian and author (died 1990)
- 1925 – John Pople, English-American chemist and academic, Nobel Prize laureate (died 2004)
- 1925 – Robert B. Rheault, American colonel (died 2013)
- 1926 – Jimmy Savile, English radio and television host (died 2011)
- 1928 – Andrew Sarris, American critic and educator (died 2012)
- 1929 – William Orchard, Australian water polo player and psychiatrist (died 2014)
- 1929 – Bud Spencer, Italian swimmer, actor, and screenwriter (died 2016)
- 1930 – Michael Collins, American general, pilot, and astronaut (died 2021)
- 1930 – Booker Ervin, American saxophonist (died 1970)
- 1931 – Dan Rather, American journalist
- 1933 – Phil Goyette, Canadian ice hockey player and coach (died 2026)
- 1933 – Iemasa Kayumi, Japanese voice actor (died 2014)
- 1934 – Princess Margaretha, Mrs. Ambler, Swedish princess
- 1935 – Dale Brown, American basketball player and coach (died 2026)
- 1935 – Ronald Graham, American mathematician and theorist (died 2020)
- 1935 – David Harvey, English-American geographer and academic
- 1936 – Michael Landon, American actor, director, producer, and screenwriter (died 1991)
- 1937 – Tom Paxton, American folk music singer-songwriter and guitarist
- 1939 – Tom O'Connor, English actor and game show host (died 2021)
- 1939 – Ron Rifkin, American actor
- 1939 – Ali Farka Touré, Malian singer-songwriter and guitarist (died 2006)
- 1940 – Craig Rodwell, American businessman and activist, founded the Oscar Wilde Bookshop (died 1993)
- 1940 – Judith Wilcox, Baroness Wilcox, English businesswoman and politician
- 1941 – Dan Alderson, American scientist (died 1989)
- 1941 – Derek Bell, English race car driver
- 1941 – Lucious Jackson, American basketball player (died 2022)
- 1941 – Sally Kirkland, American actress (died 2025)
- 1942 – David Ogden Stiers, American actor (died 2018)
- 1943 – Elliott Forbes-Robinson, American race car driver
- 1943 – Paul Frampton, English-American physicist and academic
- 1943 – Aristotelis Pavlidis, Greek politician, 13th Greek Minister for the Aegean and Island Policy (died 2022)
- 1943 – Brian Piccolo, American football player (died 1970)
- 1945 – Russ Ballard, English singer-songwriter and guitarist
- 1945 – Brian Doyle-Murray, American actor and comedian
- 1945 – Barrie Keeffe, English playwright, screenwriter, and producer (died 2019)
- 1946 – Stephen Rea, Irish actor
- 1947 – Deidre Hall, American actress
- 1947 – Frank Shorter, American runner and sportscaster
- 1947 – Herman Van Rompuy, Belgian academic and politician, 66th Prime Minister of Belgium
- 1948 – Franco Gasparri, Italian actor (died 1999)
- 1948 – Michael Kitchen, English actor and producer
- 1949 – Mart Helme, Estonian journalist and diplomat
- 1949 – Bob Siebenberg, American drummer
- 1949 – Alison Wolf, English economist and academic
- 1950 – John Candy, Canadian actor, producer, and screenwriter (died 1994)
- 1950 – Zaha Hadid, Iraqi-English architect and academic, designed the Bridge Pavilion (died 2016)
- 1950 – Jane Pauley, American journalist
- 1950 – Antonio Taguba, Filipino-American general
- 1951 – Nick Saban, American football player and coach
- 1951 – Dave Trembley, American baseball player, coach, and manager
- 1952 – Bernard Edwards, American bass player, songwriter, and producer (died 1996)
- 1952 – Joe West, American baseball umpire
- 1953 – John Lucas II, American basketball player and coach
- 1954 – Mari Okamoto, Japanese actress
- 1954 – Ken Wahl, American actor and screenwriter
- 1955 – Michalis Chrisochoidis, Greek lawyer and politician, Greek Minister of Public Order
- 1955 – Susan Orlean, American journalist and author
- 1956 – Bruce Bawer, American poet and critic
- 1956 – Christopher de Leon, Filipino actor, director, producer, and politician
- 1956 – Anders Lago, Swedish lawyer and politician
- 1956 – Charles Moore, English journalist and author
- 1957 – Brian Stokes Mitchell, American singer and actor
- 1957 – Robert Pollard, American singer-songwriter and guitarist
- 1959 – Mats Näslund, Swedish ice hockey player
- 1959 – Neal Stephenson, American author
- 1960 – Arnaud Desplechin, French director, cinematographer, and screenwriter
- 1960 – Luis Fortuño, Puerto Rican lawyer and politician, 9th Governor of Puerto Rico
- 1960 – Mike Gallego, American baseball player and coach
- 1960 – Reza Pahlavi, Crown Prince of Iran
- 1961 – Alonzo Babers, American runner and pilot
- 1961 – Kate Campbell, American singer-songwriter and guitarist
- 1961 – Peter Jackson, New Zealand actor, director, producer, and screenwriter
- 1961 – Larry Mullen, Jr., Irish musician, songwriter, and actor
- 1962 – Jonathan Borden, American neurosurgeon and academic
- 1962 – Anna Geifman, American historian, author, and academic
- 1962 – John Giannini, American basketball player and coach
- 1962 – Mari Jungstedt, Swedish journalist and author
- 1962 – Raphael Rabello, Brazilian guitarist and composer (died 1995)
- 1962 – Dan Wood, Canadian ice hockey player
- 1963 – Mikkey Dee, Swedish hard rock drummer and musician
- 1963 – Dunga, Brazilian footballer and manager
- 1963 – Johnny Marr, English singer-songwriter and guitarist
- 1963 – Fred McGriff, American baseball player
- 1963 – Dermot Mulroney, American actor
- 1963 – Rob Schneider, American actor and comedian
- 1964 – Frank Bruni, American journalist and critic
- 1964 – Colm Ó Cíosóig, Irish musician
- 1964 – Marco van Basten, Dutch footballer and manager
- 1964 – Darryl Worley, American country music singer-songwriter and guitarist
- 1965 – Paul du Toit, South African painter and sculptor (died 2014)
- 1965 – Blue Edwards, American basketball player
- 1965 – Ruud Hesp, Dutch footballer
- 1965 – Denis Irwin, Irish footballer and journalist
- 1965 – Rob Rackstraw, English voice actor
- 1966 – Ad-Rock, American rapper, producer, and actor
- 1966 – Joseph Boyden, Canadian novelist (Three Day Road, Through Black Spruce)
- 1966 – Koji Kanemoto, Japanese wrestler
- 1966 – Annabella Lwin, Anglo-Burmese singer-songwriter and record producer
- 1966 – Mike O'Malley, American actor and comedian
- 1967 – Vanilla Ice, American rapper, television personality, and real estate investor
- 1967 – Buddy Lazier, American race car driver
- 1967 – Irina Pantaeva, Russian model and actress
- 1967 – Adam Schlesinger, American bass player, songwriter, and producer (died 2020)
- 1968 – Antonio Davis, American basketball player and sportscaster
- 1970 – Linn Berggren, Swedish singer-songwriter
- 1971 – Alphonso Ford, American basketball player (died 2004)
- 1973 – Paul Abrahams, English footballer and coach
- 1973 – Christopher Bevins, American voice actor, director, producer, and screenwriter
- 1973 – Tim Byrdak, American baseball player
- 1973 – David Dellucci, American baseball player and sportscaster
- 1973 – Beverly Lynne, American actress
- 1974 – Muzzy Izzet, English-Turkish footballer
- 1974 – Roger Manganelli, Brazilian-American singer-songwriter and bass player
- 1975 – Carla Boyd, Australian basketball player
- 1975 – Fabio Celestini, Swiss footballer and manager
- 1975 – Keith Jardine, American mixed martial artist and actor
- 1975 – Johnny Whitworth, American actor and producer
- 1976 – Guti, Spanish footballer
- 1976 – Piper Perabo, American actress and producer
- 1978 – Inka Grings, German footballer and manager
- 1978 – Emmanuel Izonritei, Nigerian boxer
- 1978 – Marek Saganowski, Polish footballer
- 1978 – Martin Verkerk, Dutch tennis player
- 1979 – Ricardo Fuller, Jamaican footballer
- 1979 – Simão Sabrosa, Portuguese footballer
- 1980 – Samaire Armstrong, American model, actress, and fashion designer
- 1980 – Alondra de la Parra, Mexican-American pianist and conductor
- 1980 – Marcel Meeuwis, Dutch footballer
- 1980 – Eddie Kaye Thomas, American actor and voice artist
- 1981 – Irina Denezhkina, Russian author
- 1981 – Steven Hunter, American basketball player
- 1981 – Frank Iero, American singer-songwriter and guitarist
- 1981 – Selina Jen, Taiwanese singer and actress
- 1981 – Mike Napoli, American baseball player
- 1982 – Jordan Bannister, Australian footballer and umpire
- 1982 – Justin Chatwin, Canadian actor
- 1982 – Tomáš Plekanec, Czech ice hockey player
- 1983 – Adam Bouska, American photographer and activist, founded the NOH8 Campaign
- 1984 – Amanda Pascoe, Australian swimmer
- 1985 – Fanny Chmelar, German alpine skier
- 1985 – Kerron Clement, American hurdler and sprinter
- 1986 – Chris Alajajian, Australian race car driver
- 1986 – Christie Hayes, Australian actress and producer
- 1987 – Nick Foligno, Canadian ice hockey player
- 1987 – Jean-Karl Vernay, French race car driver
- 1988 – Cole Aldrich, American basketball player
- 1988 – Sébastien Buemi, Swiss race car driver
- 1988 – Jack Riewoldt, Australian footballer
- 1988 – Lizzy Yarnold, British skeleton racer
- 1989 – Scott McGough, American baseball player
- 1990 – JID, American rapper
- 1992 – Vanessa Marano, American actress
- 1993 – Mercedes Arn-Horn, Canadian musician
- 1993 – Nadine Lustre, Filipino actress and singer
- 1993 – Letitia Wright, Guyanese-British actress
- 1995 – Joana Valle Costa, Portuguese tennis player
- 1997 – Siobhán Bernadette Haughey, Hong Kong-Irish swimmer
- 1997 – Sydney Park, American actress and comedian
- 1997 – Marcus Rashford, English footballer
- 1997 – Holly Taylor, Canadian-American actress
- 1999 – Danielle Rose Russell, American actress
- 1999 – Léa Serna, French figure skater
- 2000 – Willow Smith, American singer, actress, and dancer
- 2002 – Ansu Fati, Spanish footballer
- 2005 – Leonor, Princess of Asturias

== Deaths ==
=== Pre-1600 ===
- 932 – Al-Muqtadir, Abbasid caliph (born 895)
- 994 – Wolfgang of Regensburg, German bishop and saint (born 934)
- 1005 – Abe no Seimei, Japanese astrologer (born 921)
- 1034 – Deokjong, Korean ruler (born 1016)
- 1147 – Robert, 1st Earl of Gloucester, son of Henry I of England (born 1100)
- 1214 – Eleanor of England, queen consort of Castile (born 1163)
- 1320 – Ricold of Monte Croce, Italian Dominican missionary (born 1242)
- 1335 – Marie of Évreux, Duchess Consort of Brabant (born 1303)
- 1448 – John VIII Palaiologos, Byzantine emperor (born 1390)
- 1517 – Fra Bartolomeo, Italian artist (born 1472)
- 1589 – Peter Stumpp, German farmer and alleged serial killer (born 1535)

=== 1601–1900 ===
- 1641 – Cornelis Jol, Dutch admiral (born 1597)
- 1659 – John Bradshaw, English lawyer and judge, Chancellor of the Duchy of Lancaster (born 1602)
- 1661 – Köprülü Mehmed Pasha, Ottoman politician, 109th Grand Vizier of the Ottoman Empire (born 1575)
- 1723 – Cosimo III de' Medici, Grand Duke of Tuscany (born 1642)
- 1732 – Victor Amadeus II, Duke of Savoy (born 1666)
- 1733 – Eberhard Louis, Duke of Württemberg (born 1676)
- 1744 – Leonardo Leo, Italian composer (born 1694)
- 1768 – Francesco Maria Veracini, Italian violinist and composer (born 1690)
- 1786 – Princess Amelia of Great Britain (born 1711)
- 1806 – Kitagawa Utamaro, Japanese artist and printmaker (born ca. 1753)
- 1820 – John Lynch, American city founder and abolitionist (born 1740)
- 1860 – Thomas Cochrane, 10th Earl of Dundonald, Scottish-English admiral and politician (born 1775)
- 1869 – Charles A. Wickliffe, American politician, 14th Governor of Kentucky (born 1788)
- 1879 – Jacob Abbott, American author and academic (born 1803)
- 1879 – Joseph Hooker, American general (born 1814)
- 1884 – Marie Bashkirtseff, Ukrainian-Russian painter and sculptor (born 1858)

=== 1901–present ===
- 1905 – Bryan O'Loghlen, Irish-Australian politician, 13th Premier of Victoria (born 1828)
- 1913 – William Evans-Gordon, English soldier and politician (born 1857)
- 1916 – Charles Taze Russell, American minister (born 1852)
- 1916 – Huang Xing, Chinese revolutionary leader and statesman (born 1874)
- 1918 – Egon Schiele, Austrian painter (born 1890)
- 1920 – Alphonse Desjardins, Canadian businessman (born 1854)
- 1925 – Max Linder, French actor, director, and screenwriter (born 1883)
- 1925 – Mikhail Frunze, Bolshevik leader during and just prior to the Russian Revolution of 1917 (born 1885)
- 1925 – Thomas Henry Tracy, Canadian architect and alderman (born 1848)
- 1926 – Harry Houdini, American magician and stuntman (born 1874)
- 1929 – António José de Almeida, Portuguese physician and politician, 6th President of Portugal (born 1866)
- 1931 – Octave Uzanne, French journalist and author (born 1851)
- 1939 – Otto Rank, Austrian psychologist, author, and educator (born 1884)
- 1944 – Joseph Hubert Priestley, British botanist (born 1883)
- 1952 – Chit Hlaing, Burmese lawyer and politician (born 1879)
- 1959 – Jean Cabannes, French physicist and academic (born 1885)
- 1960 – H. L. Davis, American author and poet (born 1894)
- 1963 – Mesut Cemil, Turkish cellist and composer (born 1902)
- 1964 – Tuomas Bryggari, Finnish politician (born 1881)
- 1972 – Bill Durnan, Canadian ice hockey player and coach (born 1916)
- 1973 – Malek Bennabi, Algerian philosopher and author (born 1905)
- 1975 – Sachin Dev Burman, Indian composer and singer (born 1906)
- 1977 – C. B. Colby, American author and illustrator (born 1904)
- 1980 – Jan Werich, Czech actor and playwright (born 1905)
- 1983 – George Halas, American football player and coach (born 1895)
- 1983 – Lu Jiaxi, Chinese self-taught mathematician (born 1935)
- 1983 – Sharof Rashidov, Uzbek politician, CPSU Politburo candidate member (born 1917)
- 1984 – Eduardo De Filippo, Italian actor, director, and screenwriter (born 1900)
- 1984 – Indira Gandhi, Indian politician, Prime Minister of India (born 1917)
- 1985 – Nikos Engonopoulos, Greek painter and poet (born 1907)
- 1985 – Poul Reichhardt, Danish actor and singer (born 1913)
- 1986 – Robert S. Mulliken, American physicist and chemist, Nobel Prize laureate (born 1896)
- 1988 – John Houseman, Romanian-born American actor, producer, and screenwriter (born 1902)
- 1988 – Alfred Pellan, Canadian painter and academic (born 1906)
- 1991 – Joseph Papp, American stage director and producer (born 1921)
- 1992 – Gary Rippingale, English ice hockey player (born 1974)
- 1993 – Federico Fellini, Italian director and screenwriter (born 1920)
- 1993 – River Phoenix, American actor and singer (born 1970)
- 1995 – Rosalind Cash, American actress and singer (born 1938)
- 1996 – Marcel Carné, French director and screenwriter (born 1906)
- 1997 – George Roth, American gymnast (born 1911)
- 1998 – Elmer Vasko, Canadian ice hockey player (born 1935)
- 1998 – María de la Purísima Salvat Romero, Spanish nun and saint (Roman Catholic Church) (born 1926)
- 1999 – Greg Moore, Canadian race car driver (born 1975)
- 2000 – Ring Lardner, Jr., American journalist and screenwriter (born 1915)
- 2000 – Kazuki Watanabe, Japanese songwriter and guitarist (born 1981)
- 2001 – Régine Cavagnoud, French skier (born 1970)
- 2002 – Lionel Poilâne, French banker and businessman (born 1945)
- 2002 – Michail Stasinopoulos, Greek jurist and politician, President of Greece (born 1903)
- 2002 – Raf Vallone, Italian footballer and actor (born 1916)
- 2003 – Richard Neustadt, American political scientist and historian (born 1919)
- 2005 – Hal Anger, American biophysicist and engineer (born 1920)
- 2005 – Amrita Pritam, Indian author and poet (born 1919)
- 2006 – P. W. Botha, South African soldier and politician, State President of South Africa (born 1916)
- 2006 – Peter Fryer, English journalist and author (born 1927)
- 2007 – Erdal İnönü, Turkish physicist and politician, Prime Minister of Turkey (born 1926)
- 2008 – Studs Terkel, American historian and author (born 1912)
- 2009 – Mustafa Mahmud, Egyptian physician and author (born 1921)
- 2009 – Tom Wheatcroft, English businessman, founded the Donington Grand Prix Exhibition (born 1922)
- 2009 – Qian Xuesen, Chinese aerodynamicist and academic (born 1911)
- 2010 – Ted Sorensen, American lawyer, 8th White House Counsel (born 1928)
- 2011 – Flórián Albert, Hungarian footballer and manager (born 1941)
- 2011 – Roberto Lippi, Italian race car driver (born 1926)
- 2012 – Gae Aulenti, Italian architect and designer (born 1927)
- 2012 – John Fitch, American race car driver and engineer (born 1917)
- 2012 – John H. Reed, American soldier and politician, 67th Governor of Maine (born 1921)
- 2013 – Chris Chase (aka Irene Kane), American actress and author (born 1924)
- 2013 – Gérard de Villiers, French journalist and author (born 1929)
- 2013 – Trevor Kletz, English chemist and author (born 1922)
- 2013 – Johnny Kucks, American baseball player (born 1933)
- 2013 – Andres Narvasa, Filipino lawyer and jurist, 19th Chief Justice of the Supreme Court of the Philippines (born 1928)
- 2013 – Bobby Parker, American singer-songwriter and guitarist (born 1937)
- 2014 – David Manker Abshire, American commander and diplomat, United States Permanent Representative to NATO (born 1926)
- 2014 – Michael Alsbury, American engineer and pilot (born 1975)
- 2014 – Brad Halsey, American baseball player (born 1981)
- 2014 – Hitoshi Motoshima, Japanese educator and politician (born 1922)
- 2015 – Gus Savage, American businessman and politician (born 1925)
- 2018 – Willie McCovey, American baseball player (born 1938)
- 2020 – Sean Connery, Scottish actor (born 1930)
- 2020 – MF Doom, British-American rapper and record producer (born 1971)
- 2021 – Peter Philpott, Australian cricketer (born 1934)
- 2023 – Ken Mattingly, American astronaut (born 1936)

== Holidays and observances ==
- Christian feast day:
  - Alphonsus Rodriguez
  - Ampliatus
  - Begu
  - Blessed Dominic Collins
  - Epimachus of Pelusium
  - Erc of Slane (in Cornwall)
  - Foillan
  - Martin Luther (Anglican Communion)
  - Paul Shinji Sasaki and Philip Lindel Tsen (Episcopal Church)
  - Quentin
  - Blessed Theodore Romzha (Ruthenian Catholic Church)
  - Blessed Tommaso Bellacci
  - Wolfgang of Regensburg
  - October 31 (Eastern Orthodox liturgics)
- Día de la Canción Criolla (Peru)
- Earliest day on which All Saints Day can fall, while November 6 is the latest; celebrated on Saturday between October 31 and November 6 (Finland, Sweden)
- Halloween and related celebrations:
  - Allantide (Cornwall)
  - Halloween (Ireland, Canada, United Kingdom, United States and other places)
  - Hop-tu-Naa (Isle of Man)
  - Samhain in the Northern Hemisphere, Beltane in the Southern Hemisphere; begins on sunset of October 31 (Gaels, Welsh people and Neopagan Wheel of the Year)
  - The first day of the Day of the Dead, celebrated until November 2 (Mexico)
- Girl Scouts Founders Day (United States)
- King Father's Birthday (Cambodia)
- National Unity Day (India)
- Reformation Day (Slovenia, parts of Germany, Chile, various Protestant churches with a particular emphasis in Lutheran and Reformed ones)
