= Lagos (disambiguation) =

Lagos is the largest city and commercial capital of Nigeria.

Lagos may also refer to:

== Places ==
=== France ===
- Lagos, Pyrénées-Atlantiques, a commune in the département of Pyrénées-Atlantiques

=== Greece ===
- Lagos, Evros, a settlement in the regional unit of Evros
- Lagos, Xanthi, a settlement in the regional unit of Xanthi

=== Mexico ===
- Lagos de Moreno, a city and municipality in Jalisco

=== Nigeria ===
- Lagos State, a state in south-western Nigeria
- Lagos Colony, former British Colony in south-western Nigeria
- Lagos Island, in the city of Lagos

=== Portugal ===
- Lagos, Portugal, a town on the Algarve coast

=== Turkey ===
- Lagos (Phrygia), a town of ancient Phrygia in Asia Minor

== People ==
=== Given name ===
- Lagus, father of Ptolemy I Soter
- Lagos Kunga (born 1998), American soccer player

=== Surname ===
- Anastasios Lagos (born 1992), Greek footballer
- Buzz Lagos, American soccer coach
- Cristhian Lagos (born 1984), Costa Rican footballer
- Diego Lagos (born 1986), Argentine footballer
- Edith Lagos (1962–1982), Peruvian rebel
- Ernesto Lagos (born 1930), Chilean athlete
- Ioannis Lagos (born 1972), Greek politician
- Manny Lagos (born 1971), American soccer player
- Mariana Lagos (born 1992), Chilean field hockey player
- Mauricio Lagos (born 1984), Chilean footballer
- Orlando Lagos (1913–2007), Chilean photographer
- Óscar Lagos (born 1973), Honduran footballer
- Ovidio Lagos (1825–1891), Argentine journalist
- Panagiotis Lagos (born 1985), Greek footballer
- Pedro Lagos (1832–1884), Chilean infantry commander
- Penelope Lagos, American actress and model
- Ricardo Lagos (born 1938), President of the Republic of Chile (2000–2006)
- Rosângela Lagos (born 1980), Cape Verdean basketball player

== Other uses ==
- Lagos (Buffyverse), a fictional demon in the TV series Buffy the Vampire Slayer
- Lagos (jewelry), American jewelry company
- HMS Lagos (D44), a Battle-class destroyer of the Royal Navy

== See also ==
- Lago (disambiguation)
- Los Lagos (disambiguation)
