= February 24 =

February 24 this year in various calendars
- Tuesday, 24 February 2026
Akan	Nkyibene
Armenian	9 Areg 1475
Aztec	Tecuilhuitontli 5, 7 Ācatl
Babylonian	6 Shabatu, 2336 SE
Balinese pawukon	Menga, Kajeng, Sri, Paing, Urukung, Anggara of Bala, Sri, Erangan, Suka
Bengali	11 Falgun, BS 1432
Chinese	Yin Earth Snake・Turtle Beak Mansion; Fire Horse Year, Month 1, Day 8 (Yushui, 9 days until Jingzhe)
Common Era	24 February 2026 CE
Coptic	17 Meshir, AM 1742
Egyptian	14 Epiphi, 2774 NE
Ethiopian	17 Yakātit, 2018 Amätä Məhrät
French Republican	Décade I, Sextidi de Ventôse de l'Année 234 de la République
Gregorian	24 February, AD 2026
Hebrew	7 Adar, AM 5786
Hindu	Kṛttikā・Indra; Solar: 12 Phālguna, 1947 SE; Lunisolar: Saptamī, Śukla pakṣa of Phālguna, 2082 VE; Rāudra・5126 KY・1,872,630
Icelandic	Þriðjudagur, 3 Góa 2025
Islamic	7 Ramadan, AH 1447 (using tabular method)
ISO week date	2026-W09-2
Japanese	8 Mutsuki, Reiwa 8 (Usui, 9 days until Keichitsu)
Julian	11 February, AD 2026 (AM 7534)
Julian day	2461096
Korean	8 Horangidal, 4359 DE
Maya	13.0.13.6.13; 11 Kayab, 7 Ben
Roman	ante diem III Idus Februarias, MMDCCLXXIX AUC
Solar Hijri	5 Esfand, SH 1404
Tibetan	8 mchu, me pho rta 2153 or 1772 or 1000

<<	February					>>
Su	Mo	Tu	We	Th	Fr	Sa
1	2	3	4	5	6	7
8	9	10	11	12	13	14
15	16	17	18	19	20	21
22	23	24	25	26	27	28
2026

February 24 in recent years
2026 (Tuesday)
2025 (Monday)
2024 (Saturday)
2023 (Friday)
2022 (Thursday)
2021 (Wednesday)
2020 (Monday)
2019 (Sunday)
2018 (Saturday)
2017 (Friday)

February 24 is the 55th day of the year in the Gregorian calendar; 310 days remain until the end of the year (311 in leap years).

== Events ==
=== Pre-1600 ===
- 484 – King Huneric of the Vandals replaces Nicene bishops with Arian ones, and banishes some to Corsica.
- 1303 – The English are defeated at the Battle of Roslin, in the First War of Scottish Independence.
- 1386 – King Charles III of Naples and Hungary is assassinated at Buda.
- 1525 – A Spanish-Austrian army defeats a French army at the Battle of Pavia.
- 1527 – Coronation of Ferdinand I as the king of Bohemia in Prague.
- 1538 – Treaty of Nagyvárad between Holy Roman Emperor Ferdinand I and King John Zápolya of Hungary and Croatia.
- 1582 – With the papal bull Inter gravissimas, Pope Gregory XIII announces the Gregorian calendar.
- 1597 – The last battle of the Cudgel War takes place on the Santavuori Hill in Ilmajoki, Ostrobothnia.

=== 1601–1900 ===
- 1607 – L'Orfeo by Claudio Monteverdi, one of the first works recognized as an opera, receives its première performance.
- 1711 – Rinaldo by George Frideric Handel, the first Italian opera written for the London stage, is premièred.
- 1739 – Battle of Karnal: The army of Iranian ruler Nader Shah defeats the forces of the Mughal emperor of India, Muhammad Shah.
- 1803 – In Marbury v. Madison, the Supreme Court of the United States establishes the principle of judicial review.
- 1809 – London's Drury Lane Theatre burns to the ground, leaving its owner, Irish writer and politician Richard Brinsley Sheridan, destitute.
- 1809 – Britain invades and captures the French colony of Martinique.
- 1812 – Treaty of Paris between Napoleon and Frederick William III of Prussia against Russia is signed.
- 1813 – Sinking of HMS Peacock by USS Hornet on the Demerara River, Guyana.
- 1821 – Final stage of the Mexican War of Independence from Spain with Plan of Iguala.
- 1822 – The first Swaminarayan temple in the world, Shri Swaminarayan Mandir, Ahmedabad, is inaugurated.
- 1826 – The signing of the Treaty of Yandabo marks the end of the First Anglo-Burmese War.
- 1831 – The Treaty of Dancing Rabbit Creek, the first removal treaty in accordance with the Indian Removal Act, is proclaimed. The Choctaws in Mississippi cede land east of the river in exchange for payment and land in the West.
- 1848 – King Louis-Philippe of France abdicates the throne.
- 1854 – A Penny Red with perforations becomes the first perforated postage stamp to be officially issued for distribution.
- 1863 – Arizona is organized as a United States territory.
- 1868 – Andrew Johnson becomes the first President of the United States to be impeached by the United States House of Representatives. He is later acquitted in the Senate.
- 1875 – The SS Gothenburg hits the Great Barrier Reef and sinks off the Australian east coast, killing approximately 100, including a number of high-profile civil servants and dignitaries.
- 1876 – The stage première of Peer Gynt, a play by Henrik Ibsen with incidental music by Edvard Grieg, takes place in Christiania (Oslo), Norway.
- 1881 – China and Russia sign the Sino-Russian Ili Treaty.
- 1895 – Revolution breaks out in Baire, a town near Santiago de Cuba, beginning the Cuban War of Independence; the war ends along with the Spanish–American War in 1898.

=== 1901–present ===
- 1916 – The Governor-General of Korea establishes a clinic called Jahyewon in Sorokdo to segregate Hansen's disease patients.
- 1917 – World War I: The U.S. ambassador Walter Hines Page to the United Kingdom is given the Zimmermann Telegram, in which Germany pledges to ensure the return of New Mexico, Texas, and Arizona to Mexico if Mexico declares war on the United States.
- 1918 – Estonian Declaration of Independence.
- 1920 – Nancy Astor becomes the first woman to speak in the House of Commons of the United Kingdom following her election as a Member of Parliament (MP) three months earlier.
- 1920 – The Nazi Party (NSDAP) is founded by Adolf Hitler in the Hofbräuhaus beer hall in Munich, Germany.
- 1942 – Seven hundred ninety-one Romanian Jewish refugees and crew members are killed after the MV Struma is torpedoed by the Soviet Navy.
- 1942 – Voice of America makes its first broadcast.
- 1942 – The Battle of Los Angeles: A false alarm leads to an anti-aircraft barrage that lasts into the early hours of February 25.
- 1943 – World War II: First large-scale protest march resulting in clashes with the Axis occupation forces and collaborationist police in Athens against rumours of forced mobilization of Greek workers for work in Germany.
- 1945 – Egyptian Premier Ahmad Mahir Pasha is killed in Parliament after reading a decree.
- 1946 – Colonel Juan Perón, founder of the political movement that became known as Peronism, is elected to his first term as President of Argentina.
- 1949 – The Armistice Agreements are signed, to formally end the hostilities of the 1948 Arab-Israeli War.
- 1966 – Ghanaian coup d'état by National Liberation Council overthrows Kwame Nkrumah's Government
- 1967 – Cultural Revolution: Zhang Chunqiao announces the dissolution of the Shanghai People's Commune, replacing its local government with a revolutionary committee.
- 1968 – Vietnam War: The Tet Offensive is halted; South Vietnamese forces led by Ngô Quang Trưởng recapture the citadel of Hué.
- 1971 – The All India Forward Bloc holds an emergency central committee meeting after its chairman, Hemantha Kumar Bose, is killed three days earlier. P. K. Mookiah Thevar is appointed as the new chairman.
- 1976 – The 1976 constitution of Cuba is formally proclaimed.
- 1978 – The Yuba County Five disappear in California. Four of their bodies are found four months later.
- 1981 – The 6.7 M_{s} Gulf of Corinth earthquake affects Central Greece with a maximum Mercalli intensity of VIII (Severe). Twenty-two people are killed, 400 are injured, and damage totals $812 million.
- 1983 – A special commission of the United States Congress condemns the Japanese American internment during World War II.
- 1984 – A child and an adult man are killed and 12 others are injured in the 49th Street Elementary School shooting in Los Angeles.
- 1989 – United Airlines Flight 811, bound for New Zealand from Honolulu, rips open during flight, blowing nine passengers out of the business-class section.
- 1991 – Gulf War: Ground troops cross the Saudi Arabian border and enter Iraq, thus beginning the ground phase of the war.
- 1996 – Two civilian airplanes operated by the Miami-based group Brothers to the Rescue are shot down in international waters by the Cuban Air Force.
- 1999 – China Southwest Airlines Flight 4509, a Tupolev Tu-154 aircraft, crashes in Rui'an, Zhejiang, China. All 61 people on board are killed.
- 2000 – Pope John Paul II arrives in Egypt for a three-day stay as part of the Great Jubilee, marking the first papal visit in modern Egyptian history
- 2004 – The 6.3 M_{w} Al Hoceima earthquake strikes northern Morocco with a maximum Mercalli intensity of IX (Violent). At least 628 people are killed, 926 are injured, and up to 15,000 are displaced.
- 2006 – Philippine President Gloria Macapagal Arroyo declares Proclamation 1017 placing the country in a state of emergency in an attempt to subdue a possible military coup.
- 2007 – Japan launches its fourth spy satellite, stepping up its ability to monitor potential threats such as North Korea.
- 2008 – Fidel Castro retires as the President of Cuba and the Council of Ministers after 32 years. He would remain as head of the Communist Party for another three years.
- 2011 – Space Shuttle Discovery launches on its final mission, STS-133.
- 2015 – A Metrolink train derails in Oxnard, California following a collision with a truck, leaving more than 30 injured.
- 2016 – Tara Air Flight 193, a de Havilland Canada DHC-6 Twin Otter aircraft, crashes, with 23 fatalities, in Solighopte, Myagdi District, Dhaulagiri Zone, while en route from Pokhara Airport to Jomsom Airport.
- 2020 – Mahathir Mohamad resigns as Prime Minister of Malaysia following an attempt to replace the Pakatan Harapan government, which triggered the 2020-2022 Malaysian political crisis.
- 2022 – Russo-Ukrainian War: Days after recognising Donetsk and Luhansk as independent states, Russian president Vladimir Putin orders the 2022 Russian invasion of Ukraine.

== Births ==
=== Pre-1600 ===
- 1103 – Emperor Toba of Japan (died 1156)
- 1304 – Ibn Battuta, Moroccan explorer
- 1360 – Amadeus VII, Count of Savoy
- 1413 – Louis, Duke of Savoy (died 1465)
- 1463 – Giovanni Pico della Mirandola, Italian philosopher (died 1494)
- 1494 – Johan Friis, Danish statesman (died 1570)
- 1500 – Charles V, Holy Roman Emperor (died 1558)
- 1536 – Pope Clement VIII (died 1605)
- 1545 – John of Austria (died 1578)
- 1553 – Cherubino Alberti, Italian engraver and painter (died 1615)
- 1557 – Matthias, Holy Roman Emperor (died 1619)
- 1593 – Henry de Vere, 18th Earl of Oxford, English soldier and courtier (died 1625)
- 1595 – Maciej Kazimierz Sarbiewski, Polish author and poet (died 1640)

=== 1601–1900 ===
- 1604 – Arcangela Tarabotti, Venetian nun and feminist (died 1652)
- 1619 – Charles Le Brun, French painter and theorist (died 1690)
- 1622 – Johannes Clauberg, German theologian and philosopher (died 1665)
- 1709 – Jacques de Vaucanson, French engineer (died 1782)
- 1721 – John McKinly, Irish-American physician and politician, 1st Governor of Delaware (died 1796)
- 1723 – John Burgoyne, English general and politician (died 1792)
- 1736 – Charles Alexander, Margrave of Brandenburg-Ansbach (died 1806)
- 1743 – Joseph Banks, English botanist and explorer (died 1820)
- 1762 – Charles Frederick Horn, German-English composer and educator (died 1830)
- 1767 – Rama II of Siam (died 1824)
- 1774 – Prince Adolphus, Duke of Cambridge (died 1850)
- 1786 – Martin W. Bates, American lawyer and politician (died 1869)
- 1786 – Wilhelm Grimm, German anthropologist, author, and academic (died 1859)
- 1788 – Johan Christian Dahl, Norwegian-German painter (died 1857)
- 1797 – Samuel Lover, Irish composer, writer and painter (died 1868)
- 1827 – Lydia Becker, English-French activist (died 1890)
- 1829 – Friedrich Spielhagen, German novelist, literary theorist and translator
- 1830 – Karolina Světlá, Czech female author
- 1831 – Leo von Caprivi, German general and politician, Chancellor of Germany (died 1899)
- 1835 – Julius Vogel, English-New Zealand journalist and politician, 8th Prime Minister of New Zealand (died 1899)
- 1836 – Winslow Homer, American painter and illustrator (died 1910)
- 1837 – Rosalía de Castro, Spanish poet (died 1885)
- 1842 – Arrigo Boito, Italian journalist, author, and composer (died 1918)
- 1848 – Andrew Inglis Clark, Australian engineer, lawyer, and politician (died 1907)
- 1852 – George Moore, Irish author, poet, and playwright (died 1933)
- 1857 – Emma Ann Browne, British-born Australian philanthropist (died 1941)
- 1868 – Édouard Alphonse James de Rothschild, French financier and polo player (died 1949)
- 1869 – Zara DuPont, American suffragist (died 1946)
- 1874 – Honus Wagner, American baseball player, coach, and manager (died 1955)
- 1877 – Rudolph Ganz, Swiss pianist, composer, and conductor (died 1972)
- 1877 – Ettie Rout, Australian-New Zealand educator and activist (died 1936)
- 1881 – Moulay Abd al-Aziz bin Hassan, Sultan of Morocco (died 1943)
- 1885 – Chester W. Nimitz, American admiral (died 1966)
- 1885 – Stanisław Ignacy Witkiewicz, Polish author, poet, and painter (died 1939)
- 1890 – Marjorie Main, American actress (died 1975)
- 1895 – Şehzade Osman Fuad, Ottoman prince (died 1973)
- 1896 – Richard Thorpe, American director and screenwriter (died 1991)
- 1898 – Kurt Tank, German pilot and engineer (died 1983)
- 1900 – Irmgard Bartenieff, German-American dancer and physical therapist, leading pioneer of dance therapy (died 1981)

=== 1901–present ===
- 1903 – Vladimir Bartol, Italian-Slovene author and playwright (died 1967)
- 1908 – Telford Taylor, American general, lawyer, and historian (died 1998)
- 1909 – August Derleth, American anthologist and author (died 1971)
- 1914 – Ralph Erskine, English-Swedish architect, designed The Ark and Byker Wall (died 2005)
- 1914 – Weldon Kees, American author, poet, painter, and pianist (died 1955)
- 1915 – Jim Ferrier, Australian golfer (died 1986)
- 1919 – John Carl Warnecke, American architect (died 2010)
- 1921 – Abe Vigoda, American actor (died 2016)
- 1922 – Richard Hamilton, English painter and academic (died 2011)
- 1922 – Steven Hill, American actor (died 2016)
- 1924 – Hal Herring, American football player and coach (died 2014)
- 1924 – Erik Nielsen, Canadian lawyer and politician, 3rd Deputy Prime Minister of Canada (died 2008)
- 1924 – F. G. Bailey, British-American anthropologist (died 2020)
- 1925 – Bud Day, American colonel and pilot, Medal of Honor recipient (died 2013)
- 1926 – Dave Sands, Australian boxer (died 1952)
- 1927 – Emmanuelle Riva, French actress (died 2017)
- 1929 – Kintarō Ōki, South Korean wrestler (died 2006)
- 1930 – Barbara Lawrence, American model and actress (died 2013)
- 1931 – Dominic Chianese, American actor and singer
- 1931 – Brian Close, English cricketer and coach (died 2015)
- 1932 – Michel Legrand, French pianist, composer, and conductor (died 2019)
- 1932 – Zell Miller, American sergeant and politician, 79th Governor of Georgia (died 2018)
- 1932 – John Vernon, Canadian-American actor (died 2005)
- 1933 – Judah Folkman, American physician and biologist (died 2008)
- 1933 – Ali Mazrui, Kenyan-American political scientist, philosopher, and academic (died 2014)
- 1933 – David "Fathead" Newman, American saxophonist and composer (died 2009)
- 1934 – Bettino Craxi, Italian lawyer and politician, 45th Prime Minister of Italy (died 2000)
- 1934 – Johnny Hills, English footballer (died 2021)
- 1934 – George Ryan, American politician, 39th Governor of Illinois (died 2025)
- 1934 – Renata Scotto, Italian soprano (died 2023)
- 1935 – Ryhor Baradulin, Belarusian poet, essayist, and translator (died 2014)
- 1936 – Carol D'Onofrio, American public health researcher (died 2020)
- 1936 – Guillermo O'Donnell, Argentine political scientist (died 2011)
- 1937 – Bruce Lloyd, Australian politician
- 1937 – Jerry Wiggin, British politician (died 2015)
- 1938 – James Farentino, American actor (died 2012)
- 1938 – Phil Knight, American businessman and philanthropist, co-founded Nike, Inc.
- 1938 – Kathleen Richardson, Baroness Richardson of Calow, British life peer
- 1939 – Jamal Nazrul Islam, Bangladeshi physicist and cosmologist (died 2013)
- 1940 – Pete Duel, American actor (died 1971)
- 1940 – Jimmy Ellis, American boxer (died 2014)
- 1940 – Denis Law, Scottish footballer and sportscaster (died 2025)
- 1941 – Joanie Sommers, American singer and actress
- 1942 – Paul Jones, English singer, harmonica player, and actor
- 1942 – Celia Kaye, American actress
- 1942 – Joe Lieberman, American lawyer and politician (died 2024)
- 1942 – Jenny O'Hara, American actress
- 1942 – Gayatri Chakravorty Spivak, Indian philosopher, theorist, and academic
- 1943 – Kent Haruf, American novelist (died 2014)
- 1943 – Gigi Meroni, Italian footballer (died 1967)
- 1943 – Pablo Milanés, Cuban singer-songwriter and guitarist (died 2022)
- 1944 – Nicky Hopkins, English keyboard player (died 1994)
- 1944 – Ivica Račan, Croatian lawyer and politician, 7th Prime Minister of Croatia (died 2007)
- 1944 – David Wineland, American physicist at the National Institute of Standards and Technology
- 1945 – Barry Bostwick, American actor and singer
- 1946 – Grigory Margulis, Russian mathematician and academic
- 1947 – Rupert Holmes, English-American singer-songwriter and playwright
- 1947 – Edward James Olmos, American actor and director
- 1948 – Jayalalithaa, Indian actress and politician, 16th Chief Minister of Tamil Nadu (died 2016)
- 1948 – Dennis Waterman, English actor (died 2022)
- 1948 – GM Quader, Bangladeshi politician
- 1949 – John Lever, English Test cricketer
- 1950 – George Thorogood, American musician
- 1951 – David Ford, Northern Irish social worker and politician
- 1951 – Derek Randall, English cricketer
- 1951 – Debra Jo Rupp, American actress
- 1951 – Helen Shaver, Canadian actress and director
- 1951 – Laimdota Straujuma, Latvian economist and politician, 12th Prime Minister of Latvia
- 1951 – Andrew Leung, Hong Kong politician, 3rd President of the Legislative Council of Hong Kong
- 1952 – Tommy Burleson, American basketball player
- 1953 – Anatoli Kozhemyakin, Soviet footballer (died 1974)
- 1954 – Plastic Bertrand, Belgian singer-songwriter and producer
- 1954 – Judith Ortiz Cofer, Puerto Rican author (died 2016)
- 1954 – Sid Meier, Canadian-American game designer and programmer, created the Civilization series
- 1954 – Mike Pickering, English DJ and saxophonist
- 1954 – Željko Glasnović, Croatian politician and general
- 1954 – Constantine Phipps, 5th Marquess of Normanby, British peer, writer, and entrepreneur
- 1955 – Steve Jobs, American businessman, co-founded Apple Computer and Pixar (died 2011)
- 1955 – Eddie Johnson, American basketball player (died 2020)
- 1955 – Alain Prost, French race car driver
- 1956 – Judith Butler, American philosopher, theorist, and author
- 1956 – Eddie Murray, American baseball player and coach
- 1956 – Paula Zahn, American journalist and producer
- 1958 – Sammy Kershaw, American singer-songwriter and guitarist
- 1958 – Mark Moses, American actor
- 1959 – Beth Broderick, American actress and director
- 1959 – Mike Whitney, Australian cricketer and television host
- 1959 – Abhishek Singhvi, Indian politician
- 1959 – François Villeroy de Galhau, 30th Governor of the Bank of France
- 1961 – Emilio Rivera, American actor
- 1961 – Erna Solberg, Norwegian politician, 35th Prime Minister of Norway
- 1961 – John Grogan, British politician
- 1962 – Kelly Craft, American businesswoman and diplomat
- 1962 – Michelle Shocked, American singer-songwriter
- 1963 – Sanjay Leela Bhansali, Indian filmmaker and composer
- 1963 – Prince Carlo, Duke of Castro
- 1963 – Mike Vernon, Canadian ice hockey player
- 1963 – Mateu Alemany, Spanish lawyer, football director of FC Barcelona
- 1964 – Russell Ingall, British-Australian race car driver and sportscaster
- 1964 – Elizabeth Wilson, American politician
- 1965 – Paul Gruber, American football player
- 1965 – Jane Swift, American businesswoman and politician, Governor of Massachusetts
- 1966 – Billy Zane, American actor and producer
- 1966 – Katie Allen, Australian politician and medical researcher
- 1967 – Brian Schmidt, Australian astrophysicist and academic, Nobel Prize laureate
- 1968 – Mitch Hedberg, American comedian and actor (died 2005)
- 1969 – Kim Seung-woo, South Korean actor
- 1970 – Jeff Garcia, American football player and coach
- 1970 – Neil Sullivan, Scottish footballer and coach
- 1970 – Jonathan Ward, American actor
- 1971 – Pedro de la Rosa, Spanish race car driver
- 1971 – Gillian Flynn, American author, screenwriter, and producer
- 1971 – Brian Savage, Canadian ice hockey player
- 1972 – Teodor Currentzis, Greek conductor and composer
- 1972 – Manon Rhéaume, Canadian ice hockey player and coach
- 1973 – Alexei Kovalev, Russian ice hockey player and pilot
- 1973 – Philipp Rösler, German politician
- 1974 – Mike Lowell, Puerto Rican baseball player
- 1974 – Khadzhimurad Magomedov, Russian freestyle wrestler
- 1974 – Gila Gamliel, Israeli politician and Minister of Science, Technology and Space
- 1975 – Ashley MacIsaac, Canadian singer-songwriter and fiddler
- 1976 – Marco Campos, Brazilian race car driver (died 1995)
- 1976 – Zach Johnson, American golfer
- 1976 – Bradley McGee, Australian cyclist and coach
- 1977 – Jason Akermanis, Australian footballer and coach
- 1977 – Bronson Arroyo, American baseball player
- 1977 – Floyd Mayweather Jr., American boxer
- 1980 – Shinsuke Nakamura, Japanese wrestler and mixed martial artist
- 1980 – Jorrit Faassen, Dutch businessman
- 1981 – Jonas Andersson, Swedish ice hockey player
- 1981 – Felipe Baloy, Panamanian footballer
- 1981 – Lleyton Hewitt, Australian tennis player
- 1981 – Mohammad Sami, Pakistani cricketer
- 1981 – Bob Sanders, American football player
- 1982 – Nick Blackburn, American baseball player
- 1982 – Fala Chen, Chinese actress and singer
- 1982 – Klára Koukalová, Czech tennis player
- 1982 – Emanuel Villa, Argentine footballer
- 1984 – Wilson Bethel, American actor
- 1984 – Corey Graves, American wrestler and sportscaster
- 1984 – Nani, Indian actor and film producer
- 1985 – Nakash Aziz, Indian playback singer and composer
- 1986 – Wojtek Wolski, Polish-Canadian ice hockey player
- 1987 – Kim Kyu-jong, South Korean singer, dancer, and actor
- 1987 – Ashley Walker, American-Romanian basketball player
- 1987 – Mario Suárez, Spanish footballer
- 1987 – Christopher Trimmel, Austrian footballer
- 1988 – Rodrigue Beaubois, French basketball player
- 1988 – Alexander Koch, American actor
- 1988 – Connie Ramsay, Scottish judoka
- 1988 – Maksym Radziwill, Polish-Canadian mathematician
- 1989 – Trace Cyrus, American singer-songwriter and guitarist
- 1989 – Daniel Kaluuya, English actor
- 1989 – Kosta Koufos, Greek-American basketball player
- 1990 – Dwayne Allen, American football player
- 1990 – Derek Wolfe, American football player
- 1991 – Tim Erixon, American-Swedish ice hockey player
- 1991 – Madison Hubbell, American ice dancer
- 1991 – O'Shea Jackson Jr., American actor and rapper
- 1991 – Semih Kaya, Turkish footballer
- 1991 – Christian Kabasele, Congolese-born Belgian footballer
- 1992 – Stefan Ashkovski, Macedonian footballer
- 1994 – Jessica Pegula, American tennis player
- 1994 – Earl Sweatshirt, American rapper
- 1995 – Tyler Bertuzzi, Canadian ice hockey player
- 1996 – Royce Freeman, American football player
- 1997 – Đurđina Jauković, Montenegrin handball player
- 2000 – Antony Matheus dos Santos, Brazilian footballer
- 2000 – Nichika Yamada, Japanese volleyball player
- 2003 – Honey Osrin, British swimmer
- 2004 – Samuele Vignato, Italian football player
- 2004 – Rafael Obrador, Spanish footballer

== Deaths ==
=== Pre-1600 ===
- 616 – Æthelberht of Kent
- 951 – Liu Yun, Chinese governor (jiedushi)
- 1018 – Borrell, bishop of Vic
- 1114 – Thomas, archbishop of York
- 1386 – Charles III of Naples (born 1345)
- 1496 – Eberhard I, Duke of Württemberg (born 1445)
- 1525 – Jacques de La Palice, French nobleman and military officer (born 1470)
- 1525 – Guillaume Gouffier, seigneur de Bonnivet, French soldier (born c. 1488)
- 1525 – Richard de la Pole, last Yorkist claimant to the English throne (born 1480)
- 1530 – Properzia de' Rossi, Italian Renaissance sculptor
- 1563 – Francis, Duke of Guise (born 1519)
- 1580 – Henry FitzAlan, 19th Earl of Arundel, English nobleman (born 1511)
- 1588 – Johann Weyer, Dutch physician and occultist (born 1515)

=== 1601–1900 ===
- 1666 – Nicholas Lanier, English composer and painter (born 1588)
- 1674 – Prataprao Gujar, 3rd Commander-in-chief of Maratha Confederacy
- 1685 – Charles Howard, 1st Earl of Carlisle, English general and politician, Lord Lieutenant of Cumberland (born 1629)
- 1704 – Marc-Antoine Charpentier, French composer (born 1643)
- 1714 – Edmund Andros, English courtier and politician, 4th Colonial Governor of New York (born 1637)
- 1721 – John Sheffield, 1st Duke of Buckingham and Normanby, English poet and politician, Lord President of the Council (born 1648)
- 1732 – Francis Charteris, Scottish soldier (born 1675)
- 1777 – Joseph I of Portugal (born 1714)
- 1785 – Carlo Buonaparte, Corsican lawyer and politician (born 1746)
- 1799 – Georg Christoph Lichtenberg, German physicist and academic (born 1742)
- 1810 – Henry Cavendish, French-English physicist and chemist (born 1731)
- 1812 – Étienne-Louis Malus, French physicist and mathematician (born 1775)
- 1815 – Robert Fulton, American engineer (born 1765)
- 1825 – Thomas Bowdler, English physician and philanthropist (born 1754)
- 1856 – Nikolai Lobachevsky, Russian mathematician and academic (born 1792)
- 1876 – Joseph Jenkins Roberts, American-Liberian politician, 1st President of Liberia (born 1809)
- 1879 – Shiranui Kōemon, Japanese sumo wrestler, the 11th Yokozuna (born 1825)

=== 1901–present ===
- 1910 – Osman Hamdi Bey, Turkish archaeologist and painter (born 1842)
- 1914 – Joshua Chamberlain, American general and politician, 32nd Governor of Maine (born 1828)
- 1925 – Hjalmar Branting, Swedish journalist and politician, 16th Prime Minister of Sweden, Nobel Prize laureate (born 1860)
- 1927 – Edward Marshall Hall, English lawyer and politician (born 1858)
- 1929 – André Messager, French pianist, composer, and conductor (born 1853)
- 1930 – Hermann von Ihering, German-Brazilian zoologist (born 1850)
- 1953 – Robert La Follette Jr., American politician, senator of Wisconsin (born 1895)
- 1953 – Gerd von Rundstedt, German field marshal (born 1875)
- 1967 – Mir Osman Ali Khan, Last Nizam of Hyderabad State (born 1886)
- 1970 – Conrad Nagel, American actor (born 1897)
- 1974 – Margaret Leech, American historian and author (born 1895)
- 1975 – Hans Bellmer, German artist (born 1902)
- 1975 – Nikolai Bulganin, Russian marshal and politician, 6th Premier of the Soviet Union (born 1895)
- 1978 – Alma Thomas, American painter and educator (born 1891)
- 1982 – Virginia Bruce, American actress (born 1910)
- 1986 – Rukmini Devi Arundale, Indian Bharatnatyam dancer (born 1904)
- 1986 – Tommy Douglas, Scottish-Canadian minister and politician, 7th Premier of Saskatchewan (born 1904)
- 1990 – Tony Conigliaro, American baseball player (born 1945)
- 1990 – Malcolm Forbes, American sergeant and publisher (born 1917)
- 1990 – Sandro Pertini, Italian journalist and politician, 7th President of Italy (born 1896)
- 1990 – Johnnie Ray, American singer-songwriter and pianist (born 1927)
- 1991 – John Daly, American journalist and game show host (born 1914)
- 1991 – George Gobel, American actor (born 1919)
- 1991 – Webb Pierce, American singer-songwriter and guitarist (born 1921)
- 1993 – Danny Gallivan, Canadian sportscaster (born 1917)
- 1993 – Bobby Moore, English footballer and manager (born 1941)
- 1994 – Jean Sablon, French singer and actor (born 1906)
- 1994 – Dinah Shore, American actress and singer (born 1916)
- 1998 – Antonio Prohías, Cuban-American cartoonist (born 1921)
- 1998 – Henny Youngman, English-American comedian and violinist (born 1906)
- 1999 – Andre Dubus, American short story writer, essayist, and memoirist (born 1936)
- 2000 – Betty Lou Beets, American murderer (born 1937)
- 2001 – Theodore Marier, American composer and educator, founded the Boston Archdiocesan Choir School (born 1912)
- 2001 – Claude Shannon, American mathematician, cryptographer, and engineer (born 1916)
- 2002 – Leo Ornstein, Ukrainian-American pianist and composer (born 1893)
- 2004 – John Randolph, American actor (born 1915)
- 2005 – Coşkun Kırca, Turkish diplomat, journalist and politician (born 1927)
- 2006 – Octavia E. Butler, American author and educator (born 1947)
- 2006 – Don Knotts, American actor and comedian (born 1924)
- 2006 – John Martin, Canadian broadcaster, co-founded MuchMusic (born 1947)
- 2006 – Dennis Weaver, American actor, director, and producer (born 1924)
- 2007 – Bruce Bennett, American shot putter and actor (born 1906)
- 2007 – Damien Nash, American football player (born 1982)
- 2008 – Larry Norman, American singer-songwriter and producer (born 1947)
- 2010 – Dawn Brancheau, senior animal trainer at SeaWorld (born 1969)
- 2011 – Anant Pai, Indian author and illustrator (born 1929)
- 2012 – Agnes Allen, American baseball player and therapist (born 1930)
- 2012 – Oliver Wrong, English nephrologist and academic (born 1925)
- 2013 – Virgil Johnson, American singer (born 1935)
- 2013 – Con Martin, Irish footballer and manager (born 1923)
- 2014 – Franny Beecher, American guitarist (born 1921)
- 2014 – Alexis Hunter, New Zealand-English painter and photographer (born 1948)
- 2014 – Carlos Páez Vilaró, Uruguayan painter and sculptor (born 1923)
- 2014 – Harold Ramis, American actor, director, producer, and screenwriter (born 1944)
- 2015 – Mefodiy, Ukrainian metropolitan (born 1949)
- 2015 – Rakhat Aliyev, Kazakh politician and diplomat (born 1962)
- 2016 – Peter Kenilorea, Solomon Islands politician, 1st Prime Minister of the Solomon Islands (born 1943)
- 2016 – Nabil Maleh, Syrian director, producer, and screenwriter (born 1936)
- 2016 – George C. Nichopoulos, American soldier and physician (born 1927)
- 2018 – Sridevi, Indian actress (born 1963)
- 2018 – Haukur Hilmarsson, Icelandic political activist and internationalist volunteer fighter (born 1986)
- 2020 – Katherine Johnson, American physicist and mathematician (born 1918)
- 2021 – Ronald Pickup, English actor (born 1940)
- 2023 – Edith Roger, Norwegian dancer and choreographer (born 1922)
- 2024 – Kumar Shahani, Indian film director and screenwriter (born 1940)
- 2025 – Roberta Flack, American singer and pianist (born 1937)

== Holidays and observances ==
- Christian feast day:
  - Blessed Ascensión Nicol y Goñi
  - Blessed Josefa Naval Girbés
  - Lindel Tsen and Paul Sasaki (Anglican Church of Canada)
  - Modest (bishop of Trier)
  - Sergius of Cappadocia
  - February 24 (Eastern Orthodox liturgics)
- Dragobete (Romania)
- Engineer's Day (Iran)
- Flag Day in Mexico
- Independence Day, celebrates the independence of Estonia from the Russian Empire in 1918; the Soviet period is considered to have been an illegal annexation.
- National Artist Day (Thailand)
- Sweden Finns' Day (Sweden)
