= Steven Dehler =

American model, actor, and dancer

Steven Edward Dehler
- Born: February 13, 1987 (age 39); Simi Valley, California
- Education: Simi Valley High School; College of the Canyons; University of California, San Diego
- Occupation: Model
- Parent(s): William and Patricia Dehler
- Modeling information
- Height: 6 ft (183 cm)
- Hair color: Blonde
- Eye color: Blue

Steven Edward Dehler (born February 13, 1987) is an American erotic model, actor, and dancer. He has been described as "the poster child for the modern male underwear model". He is a regular performer at The Abbey, a gay bar and nightclub in West Hollywood, California, and was the face of Marcuse Swimwear for their 2015 campaign.

With an active social media presence, Dehler has amassed over 233,000 followers on Instagram as of May 2017. Also in 2015, Dehler made the cover of Odyssey Magazine and played Mr. Coconuts on The Ellen DeGeneres Show.

== Biography ==
Dehler was born in Simi Valley to Patricia And William Dehler. He is one of two children, with an older brother named Kenneth Dehler. While in elementary school, Dehler was the victim of bullying, in which he was called "Steven Gayler". He graduated from Simi Valley High School in 2005, attended the College of the Canyons in Santa Clarita from 2005 to 2007, and then University of California, San Diego from 2008 to 2010. Dehler has also played the piano for approximately eighteen years, classically trained for ten of them.

== Career ==
=== Modeling ===
Dehler began his modeling career with Timoteo, an underwear and swimwear line. Along with Timoteo, he has also modeled for Marcuse, Freedom Reigns, and Marco Marco Underwear. Most prominently, Dehler has modeled for male underwear company Andrew Christian. He has been shot by Adam Bouska, Sonny Tong, Martin Ryter, Matthew Mitchell, Scott Hoover, Serge Lee, Paul Boulon, and Wander Aguiar.

In January 2015, Dehler was made DNA Magazine's online Insta-Stud.

In September 2015, Dehler made the cover of Odyssey Magazine.

=== Dancing ===
Dehler began his career working in West Hollywood. Originally he was a server in a small bar, then moved to doing bottle service at a club called Eleven. After winning a hot body contest at another club in West Hollywood, he was asked by a go-go dancer booker to dance. After dancing at many locations around the area, by 2012 Dehler was dancing exclusively for The Abbey.

=== Movies ===
| Year | Title | Character | Notes |
|---|---|---|---|
| 2017 | Cherry Pop | DJ Oscar | |
| 2016 | Second Class Citizens | Self | Post-production |

=== Music Videos ===
| Year | Title | Artist | Ref. |
|---|---|---|---|
| 2012 | Cinderfella | Todrick Hall | |
| 2013 | Spell Block Tango | Todrick Hall | |
| 2014 | Alice In WeHoLand | Todrick Hall | |
| 2015 | Bitch Perfect | Todrick Hall | |
| 2021 | Rainin' Fellas | Todrick Hall | |

=== Commercials ===
Dehler played Mr. Coconuts on a live commercial for So Delicious on the Ellen Degeneres Show in 2015.

== Personal life ==
Dehler is friends with RuPaul's Drag Race alum Detox Icunt, stating, "I've done a lot of events with Detox. We did one event last year where we were all dressed up as Mortal Kombat characters. We all run in the same circles. She has become one of my good friends. She knows what she wants. She goes for it. She's a really hard worker. She's never in town and when she is she's working. It's a great quality."

Known in the West Hollywood gay scene, Dehler is sometimes the subject of gossip columns.
