= Lago =

Lago, which means "lake" in several languages, may refer to:

== Places ==
- Lago, Calabria, a comune in the Province of Cosenza, Italy
- Lago, Mexico, a municipality zone in the State of Mexico
- Lago District, a distrito in Niassa Province, Mozambique
- Lago, Portugal, a freguesia in the District of Braga
- Lago, Asturias, a parroquia in the municipio of Allande, Spain
- Lago, Texas, a census-designated place

== People ==
- Anders Lago (born 1956), Swedish politician
- Ange Lago (born 2004), Ivorian footballer
- Ângela Lago (1945–2017), Brazilian children's writer and illustrator
- Antonio Lago (1893–1960), Venice-born French motor vehicle manufacturer
- Enrique Lago, Chilean Anglican bishop
- Fábio Lago (born 1970), Brazilian actor
- Mario Lago (1878–1950), Italian statesman and diplomat
- Mário Lago (1911–2002), Brazilian lawyer, poet, broadcaster, composer and actor
- Nais Lago (born 1914), Italian actress
- Virginia Lago (born 1946), Argentine actress

== Other uses ==
- Lago (Madrid Metro), a station on Line 5
- Talbot-Lago, a type of car
- Lago, a fictional western town depicted in the film High Plains Drifter

== See also ==
- Lagos (disambiguation)
- del Lago (disambiguation), including "de Lago"
