= Del Lago =

del Lago (Italian), de Lago (Spanish), Delago, or variation, may refer to:

== Places ==
- Castiglione del Lago, Perugia, Umbria, Italy
- Torre del Lago, Lucca, Tuscany, Italy
- Valle de Lago, Somledo, Asturias, Spain

=== Structures and facilities ===
- Plaza del Lago, Wilmette, Illinois, USA; a shopping center
- Del Lago Resort and Casino, Waterloo, New York State, USA

== People ==
- Manu Delago (born 1984) Austrian musician
- Nicol Delago (born 1996) Italian skier

=== Animals ===
- Encosta De Lago (born 1993) Australian racehorse

== See also ==
- La donna del lago (The Lady of the Lake) 1819 opera
- Lago (disambiguation)
