= College of the Canyons =

Community college in Santa Clarita, California, US

Santa Clarita Community College District and College of the Canyons
- Motto: Start here. Go anywhere.
- Type: Public community college
- Established: 1969; 57 years ago
- Parent institution: California Community Colleges
- Accreditation: ACCJC
- President: Jasmine Ruys
- Faculty: 418 (2026)
- Students: 40,987 (2024-2025 academic year)
- Location: Santa Clarita, California, United States; 34°24′16″N 118°34′05″W
- Campus: 153.4 acres (62.1 ha); Suburban
- Colors: Blue and gold
- Nickname: Cougars
- Sporting affiliations: 3C2A – WSC, SCFA (football)
- Website: canyons.edu
- Location within Santa Clarita Location within the Los Angeles metropolitan area Location within California

College of the Canyons (COC) is a public community college in Santa Clarita, California, United States. Founded in 1969, it is governed by the Santa Clarita Community College District. The college is accredited by the Accrediting Commission for Community and Junior Colleges and has locations in the Valencia and Canyon Country neighborhoods.

== History ==
Local voters approved the formation of the college in 1967. It officially opened in 1969, operating in temporary quarters on the campus of William S. Hart High School in Newhall. In 1970, the college purchased a permanent campus site along the east side of Interstate 5, south of Valencia Boulevard and north of McBean Parkway. The college relocated to a collection of modular buildings on the site in 1970 as permanent facilities were being built.

== Campus ==
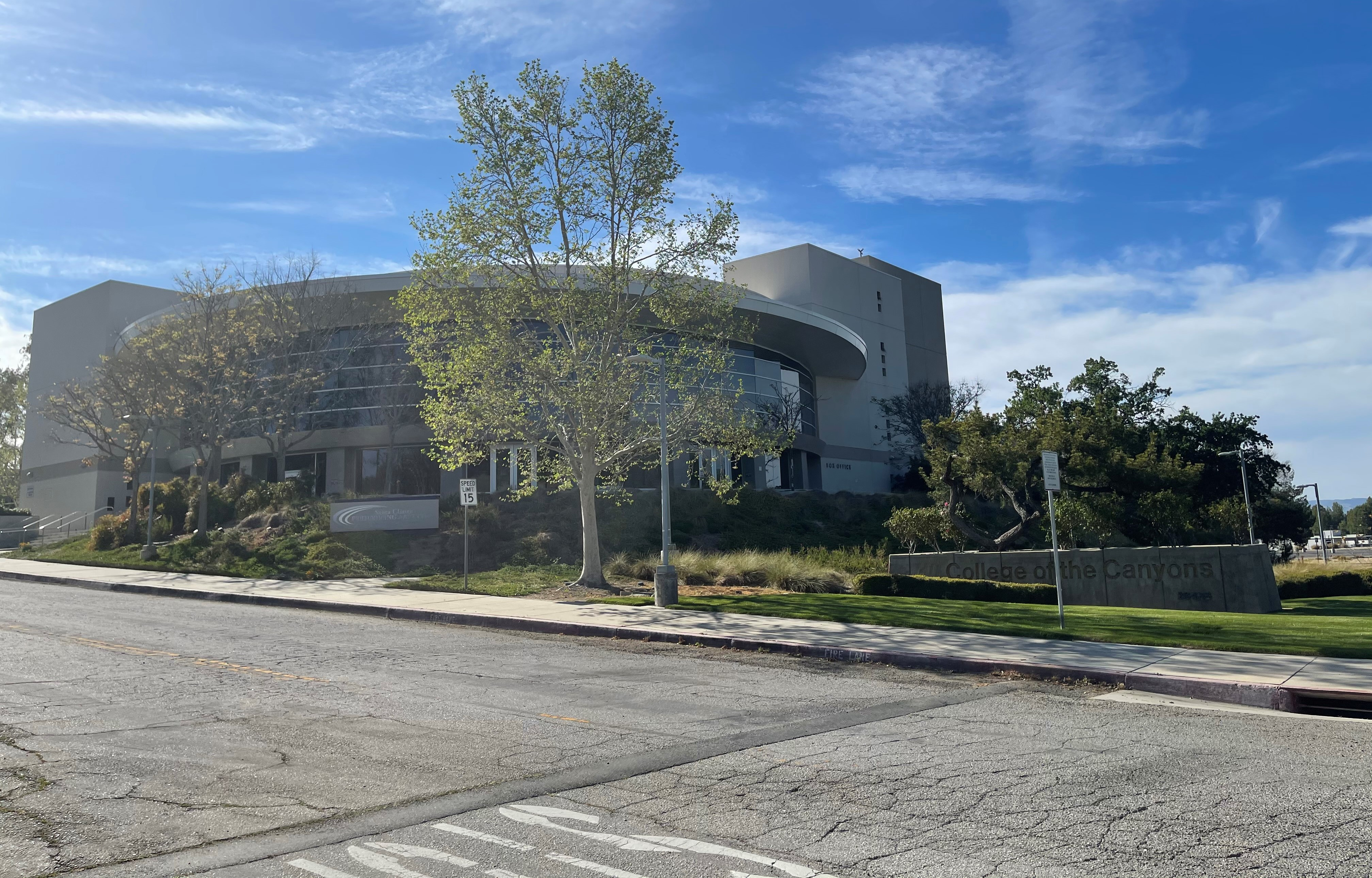
Santa Clarita Performing Arts Center, College of the Canyons

The college is located on 153.4 acres (62.1 ha) of rolling, tree-dotted hills in the neighborhood of Valencia in the city of Santa Clarita in northern Los Angeles County, California.

In 2007, the college opened its Canyon Country campus on a 70-acre (28 ha) site located at 17200 Sierra Highway, Santa Clarita, CA 91351. The campus had an enrollment of 3,845 in the fall of 2009. Its first permanent building, the Applied Technology Education Center, was scheduled to open in 2011 to provide education and training in a variety of high-demand "green" technology fields. The campus is composed primarily of modular buildings that are situated to accommodate planned permanent buildings as they are built. The campus has an outdoor venue, the Carl A. Rasmussen Amphitheater.

In 2021, the college opened a 55,000 square foot science and laboratory facility at the Canyon Country campus. The facility is called the Don Takeda Science Center after a retired biology professor.

== Academics ==
With 319 full-time faculty members (as of fall 2022), the college offers Associate of Arts and Associate of Science degrees in 103 academic programs, as well as credentials in 199 certificate programs. Academy of the Canyons, a middle college high school operated by the William S. Hart Union High School District, opened on the College of the Canyons campus in 2002 allowing promising high school students to attend high school and college concurrently.

The college also oversees the University Center, a facility where public and private universities can rent space to offer advanced degree programs on the college's campus, eliminating the need for residents to commute long distances to earn their degrees. When opened in 2010, six universities offered programs at the center: Brandman University, CSU Bakersfield, CSU Northridge, National University, University of La Verne, and UCLA Extension. However, as of fall 2026, only National and La Verne remain.

Also operating at the college are the Center for Applied Competitive Technologies, the Employee Training Institute, the Small Business Development Center and the i3 Advanced Technology Center.

== Student life ==
Demographics of student body
Ethnic Breakdown	2023
Latinos/Hispanic	48.2%
African American	5.7%
Asian	6.2%
Filipinos/Pacific Islander	3.6%
White Non-Hispanic	27.9%
Multiethnic	2.9%
Unknown	5.1%
Female	39%
Male	60.3%

Since 1994, the COC Speech Team has been recognized nationally at six consecutive Phi Rho Pi National Tournaments for all three major areas of speech competition. The team left the 2013 Phi Rho Pi National Tournament with five medals including, one gold, one silver, and three bronze medals.

=== Athletics ===
The college athletics teams are the Cougars and compete as a member of the California Community College Athletic Association (CCCAA) in the Western State Conference (WSC) for all sports except football, which competes in Southern California Football Association (SCFA). The college currently fields eight men's and nine women's varsity teams; including baseball, men's and women's basketball, men's and women's cross country, football, men's and women's golf, men's and women's soccer, softball, men's and women's swimming, women's tennis, men's and women's track and field, and women's volleyball.

The men's golf team has won nine state championships 1991 and 8 since 2000 (2000, 2002, 2006, 2008, 2013, 2015,2017 and 2019) women's golf won the state championship in fall of 2001, 2007 and back to back championships in 2018 and 2019. This is the third time that the women's and men's team have won back to back state championships in the same academic year (Fall 2001, Spring 2002, Fall 2007, Spring 2008 and in Fall 2018 and Spring 2019) The men's football team won the national championship in 2004. The men's ice hockey club won the ACHA Division III National Title in 2011. The men's baseball team has also won three state championships 1981, 1983 and 1986.

As of 2017, COC had won 179 conference titles, 31 state titles, and 1 national title. Of the conference titles, baseball holds 23, men's basketball holds 8, women's basketball holds 15, men's cross country holds 4, football holds 11, men's golf holds 23, women's golf holds 8, women's soccer holds 10, softball holds 14, men's swim holds 8 individual titles, women's swim holds 1 individual title, women's dive holds 2, men's track and field holds 2 team titles and 27 individual titles, women's track and field holds 1 team title and 17 individual titles, and women's volleyball holds 5. The 31 state titles are held by 7 teams: baseball (3), men's track and field (7), women's track and field (2), men's golf (10), woman's golf (4), football (1), and men's cross country (4). The one national championship was won by COC football in 2004.

== Filming location ==
The college's campus has been used as a filming location for many television shows and movies, including The Incredible Hulk, The Amazing Race: All-Stars, Hamburger: The Motion Picture, Power Rangers, The Girl Next Door, VR Troopers, Big Bad Beetleborgs, Bickford Shmeckler's Cool Ideas, NCIS, The Newsroom, Weeds, and The Office.

== Notable alumni ==
- Marquise Brown, professional football player
- Steven Dehler, model, actor, and dancer
- Ivan Dorschner, model and actor
- Jason Joynes, professional basketball player
- Adam Kovic, internet personality
- Suzette Martinez Valladares, politician
- Kevin McHale, actor, singer, dancer, and voice actor
- Aaron Mitchell, professional football player
- Matt Moore, professional football player
- Domata Peko, professional football player
- Jason Pierre-Paul, professional football player
- Christy Smith, politician
- Isaac Sopoaga, professional football player
- Brian Vranesh, professional golfer
- Bob Walk, professional baseball player
