= Mount Gambier Pioneers =

- Leagues: NBL1 South
- Founded: 1988
- History: Men: Mount Gambier Pioneers; 1988–present Women: Mount Gambier Pioneers; 2019–present
- Arena: Wulanda Recreation and Convention Centre
- Location: Mount Gambier, South Australia
- Team colors: Black, green, gold
- President: Tom Kosch
- Head coach: M: Peter Godfrey; W: Matt Sutton
- Championships: Men: ABA (1): 2003; SEABL (3): 2014; 2015; 2017
- Conference titles: Men: SEABL (6): 2003; 2013; 2014; 2015; 2016; 2017
- Website: NBL1.com.au

Mount Gambier Pioneers is a NBL1 South club based in Mount Gambier, South Australia. The club fields a team in both the Men's and Women's NBL1 South. The club is a division of Basketball Mount Gambier, the major administrative basketball organisation in the state's south-east region. The Pioneers play their home games at Wulanda Recreation and Convention Centre.

== Club history ==
=== Early years ===
The Pioneers made their debut in the South East Australian Basketball League (SEABL) in 1988, but only made the playoffs in one out of their first nine seasons. Under coach John Burns, the Pioneers finished the 1997 season as conference runners-up before missing the playoffs again in 1998. They finished as conference runners-up again in 2000. Burns led the Pioneers for 5½ seasons before taking up a teaching job in Indonesia just over halfway through the 2002 season; he was subsequently replaced by his assistant Sonya Knight.

=== 2003 championship ===
With Sonya Knight at the helm in 2003, the Pioneers took out the SEABL South Conference championship before going all the way and winning through to the ABA National Final, where they defeated the Ballarat Miners 127–113 to claim their first ABA championship. The 2003 Pioneers squad included Jason Sedlock (co-captain), Damien Anderson (co-captain), Damien Smith, Jamie Holmes, Kurt Russell, Allen Cram, Ben Jones, Brad Wilson, Sam Fotu, Jason Joynes and Kingsley Clarke. Russell was named Under 23 South Conference Player-of-the-Year in 2003 as well as the MVP of the National Final; Holmes won the South Conference's Most Valuable Player award; and Holmes and Anderson were both named in the SEABL All-Star starting five.

=== Era of dominance ===
After eight straight seasons of missing the playoffs between 2005 and 2012, the Pioneers won four straight SEABL South Conference titles between 2013 and 2016, all under coach Richard Hill. They also won back-to-back SEABL championships in 2014 and 2015. In 2017, the Pioneers won their fifth straight SEABL conference title, this time winning the East Conference. They went on to clinch the SEABL championship, thus winning their third national title in four years.

=== Demise of SEABL, new era in Premier League ===
Following the 2018 season, Basketball Australia disbanded the SEABL, leaving the Pioneers in limbo for 2019. In December 2018, after much deliberation, the Pioneers were accepted into the South Australian Premier League. With the SEABL being Australia's elite semi-professional competition, the Pioneers were forced to accept many concessions in order to enter the Premier League, including diluting its SEABL-quality men's team, fielding a women's team, and paying $4,000 per visiting club toward costs of the trip to Mount Gambier. The Pioneers men reached the Premier League Grand Final in 2019, where they lost 107–90 to the Forestville Eagles.

In June 2019, the Pioneers lodged a bid for their men's team to enter the New Zealand NBL in 2020. However, despite being granted entry by the New Zealand NBL Board, Basketball Australia declined to allow the Pioneers permission.

=== NBL1 ===
In October 2019, the Pioneers were granted entry into NBL1 for the 2020 season. The NBL1 South season did not go ahead in 2020 due to the COVID-19 pandemic.

In the 2022 NBL1 season, the men's team reached the NBL1 South Grand Final, where they lost to the Hobart Chargers.
