= Matt Sutton (basketball) =

Australian basketball player

Mount Gambier Pioneers
- Position: Head coach
- League: NBL1 South

Personal information
- Born: 13 July 1984 (age 42) Adelaide, South Australia, Australia
- Listed height: 193 cm (6 ft 4 in)
- Listed weight: 85 kg (187 lb)

Career information
- High school: Guard
- Playing career: 2002–2017
- Coaching career: 2019–present

Career history

Playing
- 2002–2009: Forestville Eagles
- 2006–2008: Adelaide 36ers
- 2010–2017: Mount Gambier Pioneers

Coaching
- 2019–present: Mount Gambier Pioneers

Career highlights
- As player: 3× SEABL champion (2014, 2015, 2017); 2× Central ABL champion (2003, 2006); As coach: NBL1 South Coach of the Year (2022)

Matt Sutton (born 13 July 1984) is an Australian basketball coach and former player.

Between 2002 and 2009, Sutton played in the Central ABL for the Forestville Eagles. In 2006, he joined the Adelaide 36ers for the 2006–07 NBL season. He continued on with the 36ers in 2007–08, and in 50 games over two seasons, he averaged 3.3 points, 1.4 rebounds and 1.1 assists per game.

In 2010, Sutton joined the Mount Gambier Pioneers of the South East Australian Basketball League (SEABL). In 2012, he became captain of the Pioneers and guided them to five straight conference titles between 2013 and 2017, including championships in 2014, 2015 and in his final season in 2017. In 212 SEABL games for the Pioneers, he averaged 6.5 points, 2.9 rebounds and 2.1 assists per game.

In 2019, Sutton debuted as head coach of the Mount Gambier Pioneers women's team in the Premier League. He coached his second season with the Pioneers in 2021 in the NBL1 South. He was named NBL1 South Coach of the Year in 2022. He returned for his fourth season with the Pioneers women's team in 2023. In August 2024, he re-signed as the Pioneers women's coach on a three-year deal.
