= Jason Joynes =

Australian basketball player (1970–2024)

Personal information
- Born: 23 January 1970
- Died: 18 September 2024 (aged 54)
- Listed height: 6 ft 9 in (2.06 m)
- Listed weight: 270 lb (122 kg)

Career information
- College: College of the Canyons (1991–1993)
- Playing career: 1988–2006
- Position: Center
- Coaching career: 2018–2019

Career history

Playing
- 1988: Adelaide Buffalos
- 1989: Mount Gambier Pioneers
- 1989–1990: Westside Melbourne Saints
- 1991–1993: Newcastle Falcons
- 1994–1995: Geelong Supercats
- 1996–2004; 2006: Mount Gambier Pioneers

Coaching
- 2018–2019: North Adelaide Rockets

Career highlights
- ABA National champion (2003); SEABL South All-Star Five (1997)

Jason Joynes (23 January 1970 – 18 September 2024) was an Australian basketball player. He played two seasons of college basketball in the United States for College of the Canyons and seven seasons in the National Basketball League (NBL) in Australia. He also played 12 seasons in the South East Australian Basketball League (SEABL), 11 of them with the Mount Gambier Pioneers.

== Early life ==
Joynes was a native of Adelaide, South Australia. He first played basketball at age 15 after initially playing Australian rules football. He played junior basketball with Sturt in South Australia.

== Career ==
In 1988, Joynes debuted in the SEABL for the Adelaide Buffalos, playing nine games. He continued in the SEABL in 1989 with the Mount Gambier Pioneers. He played seven games for the Pioneers before being acquired by the Westside Melbourne Saints in the NBL.

Joynes played in just four games in his debut NBL season in 1989. His production increased significantly during his second season in 1990, when he appeared in a career-high 26 matches for the Saints.

Joynes joined the Newcastle Falcons in 1991, where he spent the next three seasons. His best statistical year came with the Falcons in 1992, when he averaged 7.6 points and 5.3 rebounds per game.

During this time, Joynes played two seasons of college basketball in the United States for College of the Canyons. He hoped originally to play for Quincy College, an NCAA Division II team, but he did not meet the academic requirements at the school. As a freshman in 1991–92, Joynes was listed as a 6-foot-9, 265-pound center. He played mostly 15 feet from the basket in his first college season, playing with his back to the basket on the offensive end of the floor for the first time. Despite his bulk, Joynes had been a perimeter shooter in Australia. He averaged around 11 points and 5 rebounds per game. As a sophomore in 1992–93, Joynes was listed as 6-foot-9 and 270 pounds.

The final two seasons of Joynes' NBL career came with the Geelong Supercats in 1994 and 1995. One of his best games came in the 1995 season, when he amassed 23 points and 15 rebounds in a Round 18 clash against the North Melbourne Giants.

Joynes returned to the Mount Gambier Pioneers in the SEABL in 1996, playing for them every year until 2004 and then again briefly in 2006. As team captain in 1997, he helped the Pioneers finish as South Conference runners-up while leading the league in field goal percentage, rebounding and was named All-Star Five. He led all Australian Basketball Association (ABA) conferences that season in rebounding, and at club level was awarded MVP. In 2003, he was a member of the Pioneers team that won the SEABL South Conference grand final and the ABA National championship. That year, he was inducted as the club's inaugural life member. In 2015, he was inducted as one of the first members of the Pioneers Hall of Fame.

Joynes retired having played a total of 267 ABA and SEABL games and held the club record for games until 2022. As of September 2024, he held the club record for total rebounds (2829) and was third in blocked shots.

Joynes served as head coach of the North Adelaide Rockets women's team in the Premier League in 2018 and 2019.

== Personal life ==
Joynes was the son of Eric and Robyn Joynes and he had a sister, Sheraleen.

Joynes and his wife Michelle had three children: Eliza, Isaac and Scarlett. Eliza played college basketball for the Loyola Marymount Lions.

Between 2021 and 2024, Joynes served as vice president of the Woodville Warriors basketball club.

=== Illness and death ===
In April 2024, Joynes was diagnosed with a rare form of neuroendocrine tumours cancer, after complaining of a change in his bowel movements. He immediately commenced chemotherapy. After several rounds of chemo, scans revealed the cancer was extensive and further treatment was no longer possible. He died on 18 September 2024, at the age of 54. His funeral was held twelve days later in Port Adelaide.
