= Mauricio Lagos =

Chilean footballer (born 1984)

Personal information
- Full name: Mauricio Eduardo Lagos González
- Date of birth: 5 April 1984 (age 42)
- Place of birth: Talcahuano, Chile
- Height: 1.86 m (6 ft 1 in)
- Position: Centre-back

Senior career*
| Years | Team | Apps | (Gls) |
| 2003–2012 | Deportes Concepción | 99 | (1) |
| 2006 | Deportes Concepción B | – | (–) |
| 2008 | → Fernández Vial (loan) | 12 | (0) |
| 2009 | → Naval (loan) | 22 | (0) |
| 2012–2013 | Lota Schwager | 2 | (0) |
| Total | | 135 | (1) |
- * Club domestic league appearances and goals

Mauricio Eduardo Lagos González (born 5 April 1984) is a former Chilean footballer who played as a centre-back.

He played for Deportes Concepción.
