= Edith Lagos =

Edith Lagos Saez
- Edith Lagos being arrested
- Born: November 27, 1962
- Died: September 2, 1982 (aged 19)
- Military career
- Branch: Shining Path
- Conflicts: Internal conflict in Peru

Edith Lagos was a Peruvian member of Shining Path. Lagos was a prominent promoter of the group's agenda.

== Life ==
Lagos was born in Ayacucho to a wealthy family. She studied law at Universidad de San Martín de Porres in Lima before dropping out to join Shining Path

In 1980, Lagos escaped the Ayacucho jail after a Shining Path detachment blew a hole in the jail wall. She spent the next two years promoting Shining Path and participating in their operations.

In 1982, Lagos was killed in Umaca, Peru, in a shootout with police and paramilitary forces. She was buried in Ayacucho. It was estimated that up to 30,000 people attended the funeral. Lago's tomb was later bombed by the Rodrigo Franco Command.
