= Lagos (jewelry) =

American jewelry company

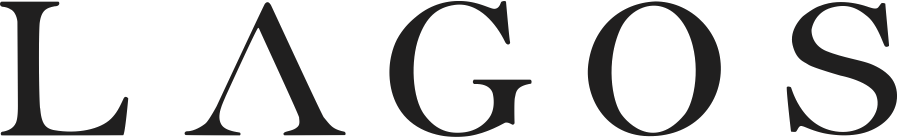
- Company type: Private company
- Industry: Jewelers, Silversmiths, Goldsmiths
- Founded: 1977; 49 years ago
- Founder: Steven Lagos
- Headquarters: 441 N 5th St, Philadelphia, Pennsylvania
- Area served: USA, Canada & the Caribbean

Lagos is a privately held American jewelry company. Founded by Steven Lagos in 1977, the brand is known for its jewelry craftsmanship and the proprietary design technique of textured caviar-like beading. The company has offices in New York and Bangkok with its corporate headquarters in Philadelphia.

LAGOS is sold in over 300 stores within the United States, including Neiman Marcus, Bloomingdale’s, Nordstrom, and independent jewelry retailers throughout the country. The brand’s flagship boutique opened in 1994 on Rittenhouse Square in Philadelphia, Pennsylvania.

== History ==
Lagos jewelry was founded in 1977 by American artist and designer, Steven Lagos. At age 17, he met his mentor, a Russian jeweler, who taught him the importance of jewelry craft and technique. It was then he began learning “the lessons of old world craftsmanship” and “the importance of working with the highest quality materials.” Steven Lagos founded the company at age 20.

Since 1977, LAGOS has made more than two million pieces. Steven Lagos estimates that he has created 10,000 pieces and 400 to 500 new designs each year.

== Design ==
In 1984, Steven Lagos created the brand’s textured sterling silver known as Caviar. This was inspired by the raw material of hematite.
