= Lagos (Phrygia) =

Ancient town of Phrygia

Lagos was a town of ancient Phrygia, on the north-east of Mandropolis. The town is mentioned only by Livy in his account of the progress of the Roman consul Gn. Manlius in Asia Minor, when Lagos was found deserted by its inhabitants, but well provided with stores of every description, whence we may infer that it was a town of some consequence.

Its site is unlocated.
