= Los Lagos =

Los Lagos (Spanish meaning "The Lakes") may refer to:

- Los Lagos Region, Chile
- Los Lagos Department, Neuquén Province, Argentina
- Los Lagos, Chile, a town and municipality in Los Rios Region
