= NOH8 Campaign =

LGBT charitable organization

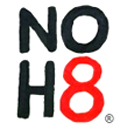
- NOH8 Campaign Logo
- Formation: 2009
- Type: 501(c)(3)
- Location: Wendell, North Carolina, US
- Founders: Adam Bouska & Jeff Parshley
- Website: NOH8Campaign.com

The NOH8 Campaign (NOH8 meaning "No Hate") is a charitable organization whose mission is to advocate for same-sex marriage and gender equality through education, advocacy, social media, and visual protest.

The campaign was created as photographic silent protest by celebrity photographer Adam Bouska and partner Jeff Parshley in response to the passage of Proposition 8. Photos featured subjects with duct tape over their mouths, symbolizing their voices being silenced by Prop 8 and similar legislation around the world, with "NOH8" painted on one cheek in protest. "H8" (leet for 'hate') is short for "Proposition H8" (pronounced "proposition hate"), a nickname used by critics of the proposition. The photos were featured on the campaign's website, as well as social networks, and a virtual world campaign in Second Life.

The images appeared on social networking sites Facebook and Twitter to spread the message of equality. Some photographers and student groups set up their own photoshoots. The campaign photos circulated on the internet and appeared on many supporters' social networking profiles. Both LGBT and non-LGBT people participated in the photoshoots. Slogans popularized by the campaign included: #NOH8 "No Hate", #NOH8inMySt8 "No Hate In My State", #NOH8Worldwide "No Hate Worldwide", #AllLoveNOH8 "All Love No Hate".

== History ==
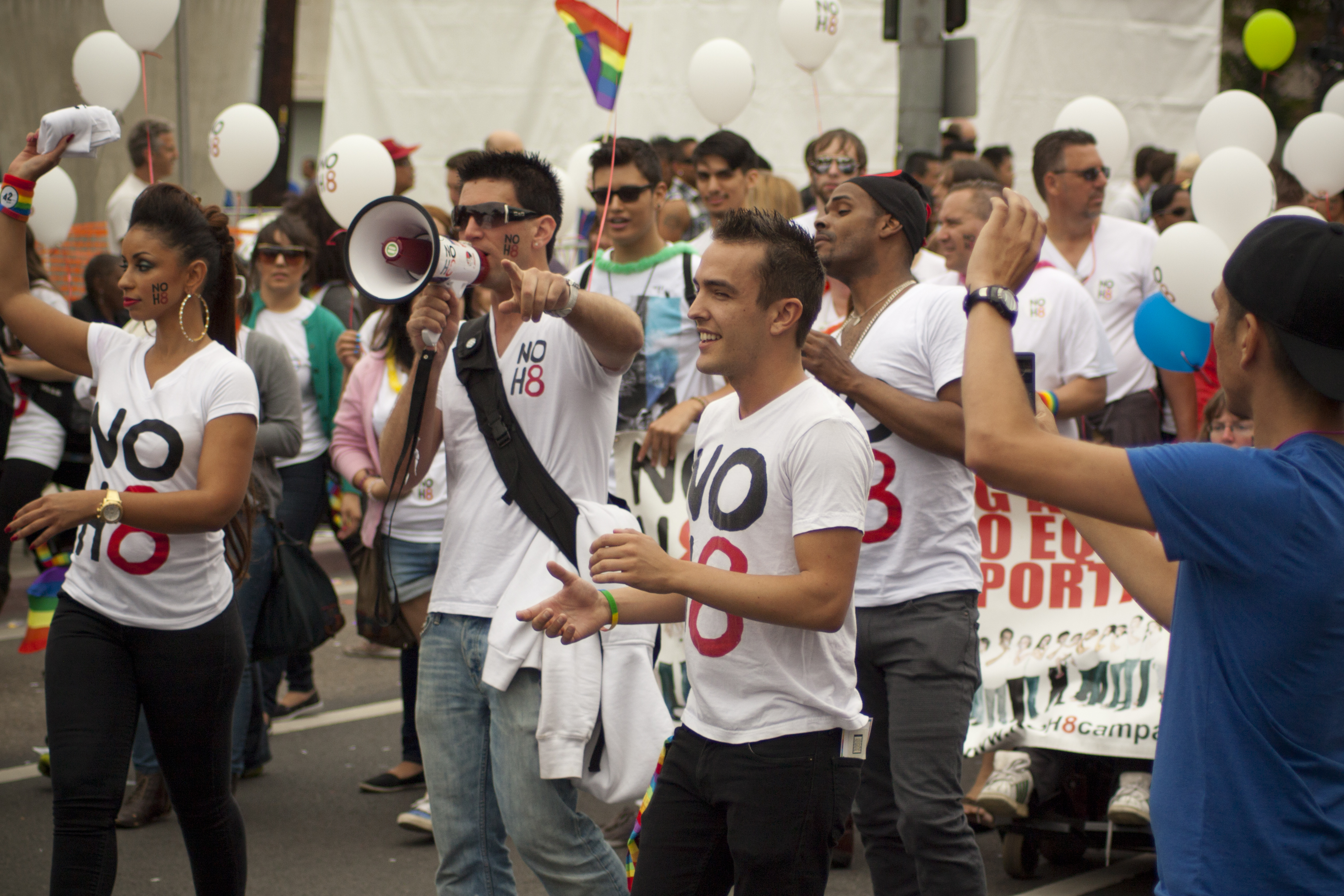
NOH8 Campaign at the Los Angeles LGBT pride parade in 2011

On November 4, 2008, Proposition 8 passed in California, amending the state Constitution to ban same-sex marriage. The defeat provoked a groundswell of initiative within the LGBT community at a grassroots level, with many new political and protest organizations being formed in response. The NOH8 Campaign was created in 2009 as a result of the passage of Proposition 8, which added an amendment to the California Constitution to ban gay marriage. Proposition 8 was effectively overturned in 2013 as a result of the Ninth Circuit Court of Appeals decision to affirm a lower court's ruling on Perry v. Schwarzenegger. Inspired by Proposition 8, the scope of the NOH8 Campaign expanded its goals to fight discrimination and bullying generally and to spread a worldview of acceptance.

=== Events ===
- During the Miss USA 2009 controversy, former Miss USA, Shanna Moakler and co-executive state pageant director Keith Lewis encouraged Tamiko Nash, Miss California and Miss USA 2006 first runner-up, and 2008 Miss California Raquel Beezley to attend a photo shoot to protest Carrie Prejean's views on same-sex marriage in the United States. Later, former Miss USA and Miss Universe 1997 Brook Lee posed for the NOH8 campaign.
- On May 25, 2009, the NOH8 campaign released a public service announcement, and on August 12, 2009, a second PSA called "Coming Out".
- On November 18, 2009, the campaign announced that the city of West Hollywood, California, plans to make December 13 the official "NoH8 Day."
- On November 5, 2010, the NOH8 Campaign was approved as a Public Benefit charity by the California Attorney General's office, thus allowing for it to be a 501(c)(3) Non-Profit Corporation.

== Celebrity and political support ==
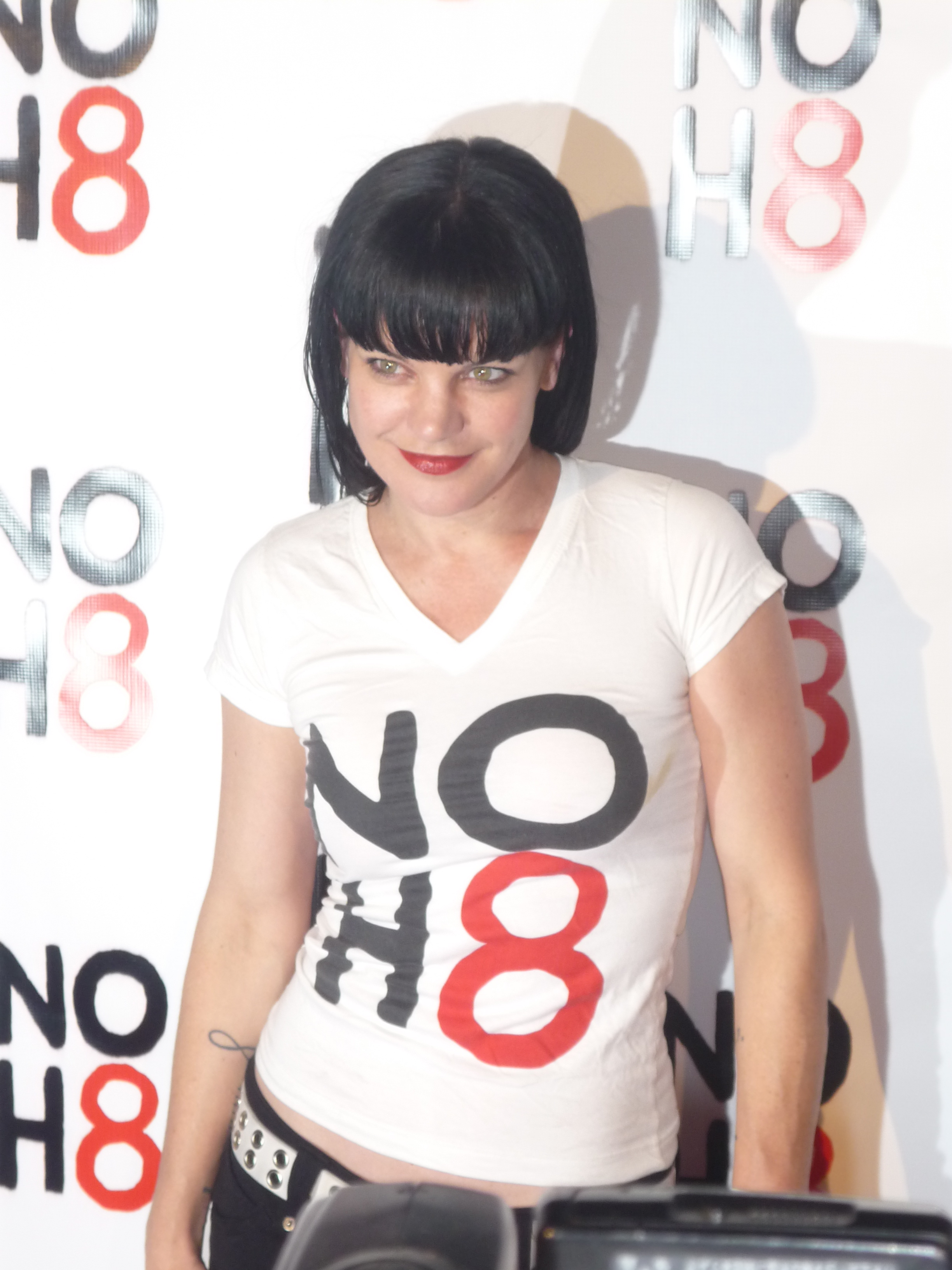
Actress Pauley Perrette attending the NOH8 campaign

Proceeds from the November 2011 music video Attention Please by Darryl McDaniels of Run–DMC and actress Pauley Perrette of NCIS were donated to the NOH8 campaign. Perrette supported NOH8 by providing memorabilia for auction and with awareness-raising efforts such as wearing a NOH8 dress to the People's Choice Awards in 2011 and adding a silent protest photo as the background and profile pic on her official Twitter account.

Former WWE wrestler Darren Young wore a NOH8 hoodie for his match at the Elimination Chamber PPV in February 2014 (he was the first WWE performer to come out publicly as gay while active as a wrestler with the company), and in April 2014, numerous WWE wrestlers participated in a photo shoot to promote the campaign.

== See also ==
- LGBT rights in the United States
