= Running Russell Simmons =

American reality television series

- Genre: Reality
- Starring: Russell Simmons
- No. of seasons: 1
- No. of episodes: 6

Production
- Executive producers: Amy Kohn; Bryan Scott; Danny Salles; Lesley Goldman; Lisa M. Tucker; Russell Simmons; Stan Lathan
- Running time: 45 minutes
- Production companies: Simmons Lathan Media Group; Picture This Television

Original release
- Network: Oxygen
- Release: November 2 – December 7, 2010

Running Russell Simmons is an American reality television series on Oxygen that premiered on November 2, 2010. The series chronicles the lives of Russell Simmons and his assistants as they manage his business deals, family life and party planning.

== Cast ==
- Russell Simmons
- Simone Reyes
- Christina Paljusaj
- Adair Curtis
- Tricia Clarke-Stone
- Piper McCoy
- Aly Kinloch
- Sagen Albert

== Episodes ==
No.	Title	Original release date
1	"Models, Bottles and Intern Squabbles"	November 2, 2010
2	"Basic Instinct"	November 9, 2010
3	"Party Pooper"	November 16, 2010
4	"Fashion Faux Pas"	November 23, 2010
5	"You Only Live Once"	November 30, 2010
6	"Art for Life"	December 7, 2010
