= Adam Bouska =

American fashion photographer

Adam Bouska (born October 31, 1983, in Decatur, Illinois) is an American fashion photographer who runs a photography studio based out of West Hollywood, California. Known for pictures of male models in particular, he is considered a rising 'superstar photographer' in the gay community. Bouska is most recognized for co-creation of the internationally recognized NOH8 Campaign.

Bouska has worked with familiar faces such as Miley Cyrus, Ricky Martin, Liza Minnelli, Barry Manilow, George Takei, Pauley Perrette, and Lisa Ling. Most recently, Bouska helped create book covers for Jane Lynch, Jenny McCarthy, Jenni Pulos and Meghan McCain. No stranger to activism, Bouska's photography has aided a variety of charitable causes including a fund-raising calendar for AIDS Project Los Angeles in 2008, a national ad campaign with Nia Vardalos for HelpUsAdopt.org in 2011, an edgy calendar (6 packs / 9 lives) featuring men and their cats to promote adoptions for FoundAnimals.org in 2012, and 'Lights Out', a marriage equality ad campaign for ECOYA in 2013.

In addition to his published work, Bouska has made appearances on TV shows including: Running Russell Simmons, Giuliana & Bill, Keeping up with the Kardashians, The Real Housewives of Orange County, The Millionaire Matchmaker, Million Dollar Listing, The World According to Paris, Hollywood Exes, MelB: It's a Scary World, and Dog the Bounty Hunter.

Bouska is openly gay. He lives in Los Angeles, California. Bouska was recognized as the community's leading photographer at the West Hollywood awards in 2007 & 2010, selected as one of The Advocate's '40 Under 40' in 2010, featured as one of Out magazine's 'OUT100' in 2011 and a Shorty Award winner for Photography in 2012.

== NOH8 Campaign ==
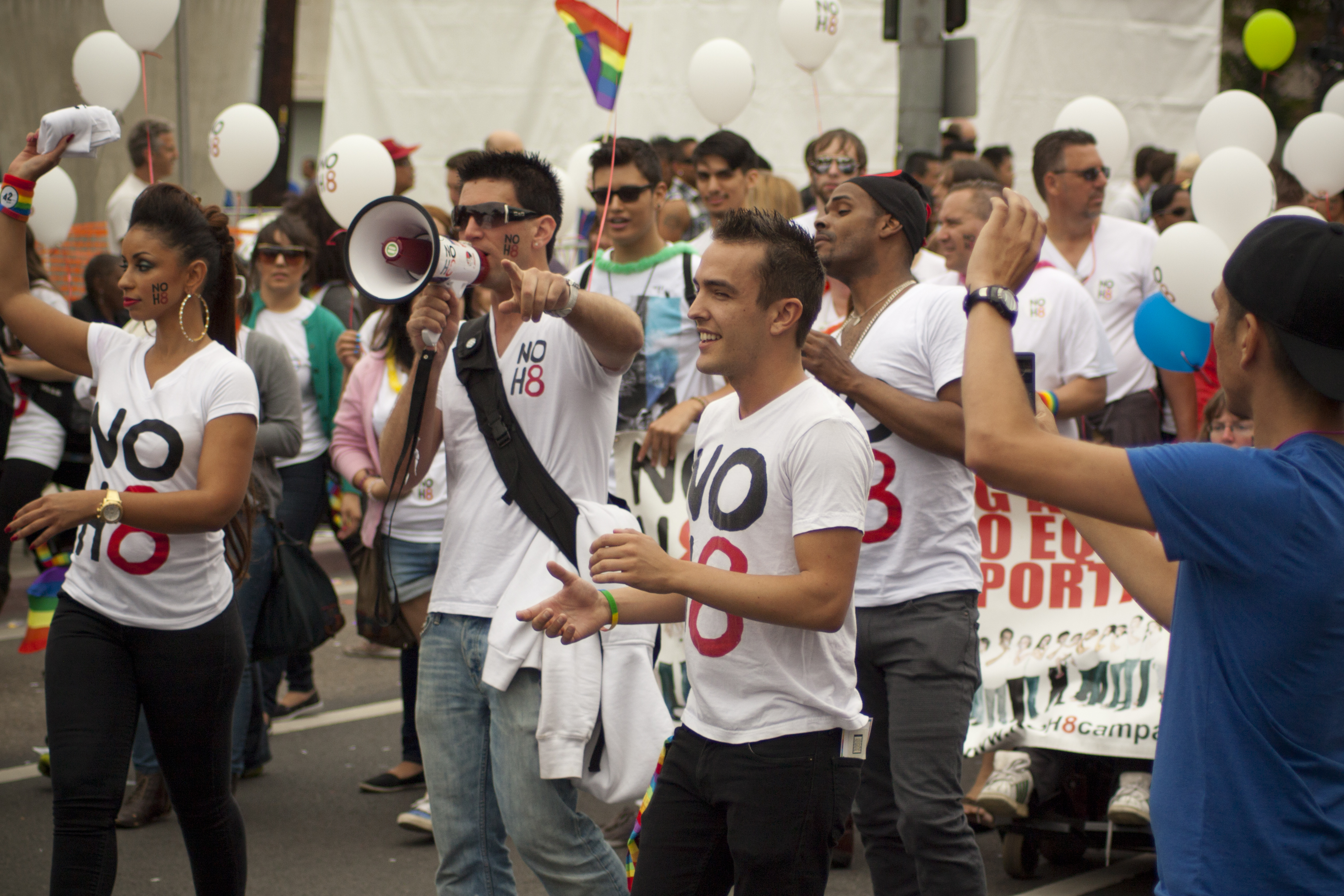
Bouska and NOH8 Campaign members at the Los Angeles LGBT pride parade in 2011

In November 2008, in response to the narrow approval in California of Proposition 8, which banned same-sex marriage, Bouska and his partner, Jeff Parshley, founded the NOH8 Campaign to promote the overturn of this ban. While beginning at a grassroots level, by April 2009 the campaign had seen support from such celebrities as Leslie Jordan, Shanna Moakler, and RichGirl; and became involved in the Miss USA 2009 controversy. The campaign has now gained the support of other notables, including Johnny Depp, Liza Minnelli, Miley Cyrus, Annie Lennox, Kathy Griffin, Denise Richards, Jane Lynch, Mark Hoppus, Lisa Edelstein, Rose McGowan, Erin Cahill and Steve-O.

== See also ==
- America's Next Top Model, Cycle 7
