= Paul Shinji Sasaki =

The Rt Revd Paul Shinji Sasaki
- Bishop of Mid-Japan and Tokyo
- Province: Anglican Church in Japan

Personal details
- Born: March 11, 1885 Japan
- Died: 21 December 1946 (aged 61) Tokyo, Japan
- Education: Westcott House, Cambridge

Paul Shinji Sasaki (パウロ 佐々木 鎮次)、(March 11, 1885 – December 21, 1946) was an Anglican bishop of the Diocese of Mid-Japan and later of Tokyo, in the Nippon Sei Ko Kai, the Province of the Anglican Communion in Japan.

== Early life and education ==
Sasaki studied at Kelham Hall of the Society of the Sacred Mission and at Westcott House, Cambridge, England. He was ordained deacon on December 21, 1912, and priest on April 25, 1917, by the Right Reverend Cecil Henry Boutflower, Bishop of South Tokyo.

Sasaki worked as Professor of Liturgics and Applied Theology at Central Theological College, Tokyo and on July 25, 1935, was consecrated in Nagoya as the first Japanese diocesan bishop of Mid-Japan, a region stretching from Nagoya to Niigata, formerly served by the missionary work of the Anglican Church of Canada. As bishop he succeeded Canadian Heber J. Hamilton.

== Leadership During the Second World War ==
Sasaki served as the Primate of the Nippon Sei Ko Kai throughout much of the Second World War. During this period the majority of Protestant churches in Japan were forcibly brought together by the Japanese wartime government to form the United Church of Christ in Japan, or Kyodan. Reflecting the distinctive doctrinal character of the Anglican Communion, and a fear of state intervention in religion, many individual Nippon Sei Ko Kai congregations refused to join.

Sasaki, in a written statement issued in October 1942 and signed by the majority of the Japanese bishops, was adamant in rejecting the proposed union with Kyodan. The statement upheld the authority of the Anglican church's episcopacy and Apostolic succession and highlighted, among other reasons for rejecting the government proposal, the failure of Kyodan to adopt the Apostles Creed as one of its main theological tenets.

The cost of resistance to and non-cooperation with the government's religious policies was public criticism by prominent lay and ordained members of the Nippon Sei Ko Kai, harassment by the military police and periods of imprisonment for church leaders such as Sasaki, as well as Bishops Samuel Heaslett and Todomu Sugai(須貝 止).

On January 25, 1944, Sasaki was installed at St. Andrew's Cathedral, Tokyo as Bishop of Tokyo to replace Bishop Peter Yonetaro Matsui

During late 1944, government prosecutors examined Sasaki and Bishop of South Tokyo Todomu Sugai, on numerous occasions; military police detaining them for extended periods at Sugamo Prison. Reports of torture at the hands of the military police at Sugamo Prison are also recorded. On their release on the 16th June 1945, both men were found malnourished and in poor health from their confinement, neither being able to walk without assistance.

Sasaki had remained in Tokyo throughout the Allied incendiary bombing of the city. At considerable personal risk, he held fast to the principle that religion should not be unduly interfered with by the state. Sasaki died less than a year after his release from prison at the end of the war.

== Legacy ==
For his courage and leadership of the Japanese Anglican community during the Second World War Sasaki is commemorated along with Bishop of Honan Lindel Tsen on February 24 on the Calendar of saints (Anglican Church of Canada).

The Nippon Sei Ko Kai, reflecting on the legacy of Bishop Sasaki, the Japanese occupation of China and Korea, actions during wartime and the challenge of maintaining authentic Christian witness in the face of nationalist government policy, adopted a formal Statement of War Responsibility at its General Synod in 1996.

"The Church had chosen to comply with the government policy and had forgotten its mission .... Since its establishment, the Nippon Sei Ko Kai has been making compromises with the idea of a Tenno (God of Heaven) ruled nation and militarism which go against the Gospel and has not been able to resist strongly against, or refuse those principles.

Our Church has not been able to stand beside those who are oppressed and suffering .... We have been a closed Church whose main concern is the expansion of the membership and the retention of the institution, thus being unable to serve as the salt of the earth as indicated in the Gospel."

[The Nippon Sei Ko Kai] "confesses to God and apologizes to the people in Asia and the Pacific that we did not admit our fault immediately after the end of the war, and have not actively called for reconciliation and compensation until today."

— Nippon Sei Ko Kai, Statement of War Responsibility, General Synod Resolution, adopted 23rd May 1996

A presentation of this statement and homily by the Rev. Canon Susan Cole-King, daughter of Leonard Wilson, the Bishop of Singapore during the Japanese occupation, was made at a liturgy led by Nippon Sei Ko Kai bishops celebrating the Feast of the Transfiguration at the 1998 Lambeth Conference.

The NSKK is active in multi-year projects promoting peace, reconciliation and youth exchange programs between East Asian nations. In 2013 the NSKK co-hosted with the Anglican Church of Korea, the 2nd Worldwide Anglican Peace Conference in Okinawa.

== See also ==
- Anglican Church in Japan
- Anglican Communion
