= Lindel Tsen =

Anglican bishop in China

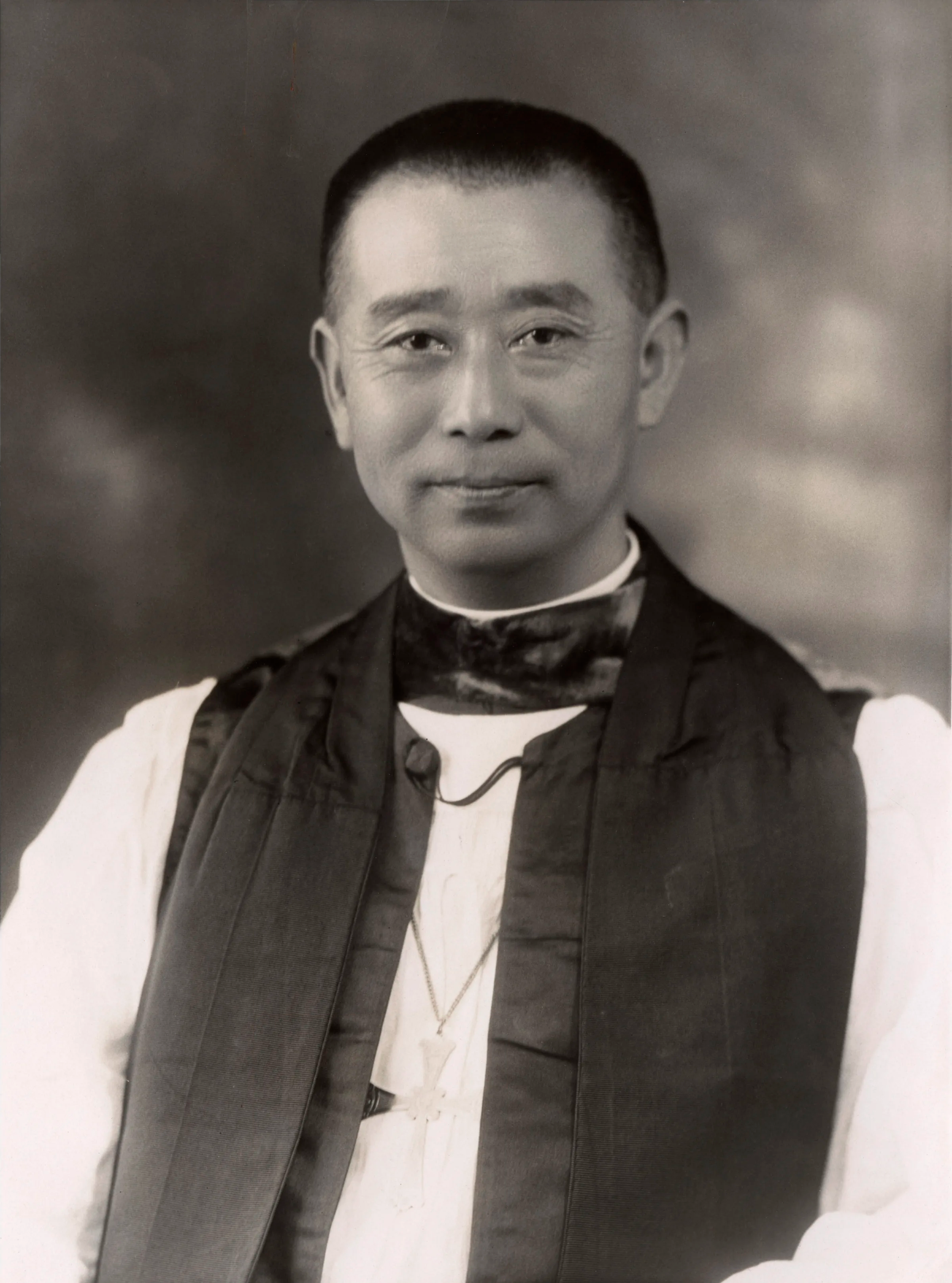
Tsen in 1930

The Rt. Rev. Philip Lindel Tsen (Chinese: 鄭和甫; January 7, 1885 – June 6, 1954) was a bishop of the Anglican Church in China (Chung Hua Sheng Kung Hui; Chinese: 中華聖公會). Tsen was the first Chinese Presiding Bishop of the Chung Hua Sheng Kung Hui and was succeeded by Bishop Robin Chen of the Diocese of Anhui province.

== Early life and ministry ==
Born in impoverished circumstances in Wuhu, Anhui Province in 1885. Homeless at the age of 14, Tsen was taken in by the Rev. Francis E. Lund of the American Church Mission. One of the few Chinese confirmed by James Addison Ingle during his brief tenure as Bishop of Hankow. A student at St. James High School in Wuhu thereafter Boone College in Wuchang where he graduated from Boone Divinity School in 1909. Ordained as a deacon in 1909 in St. Paul's Cathedral, Hankow by Bishop Logan Roots and as an Anglican priest by Bishop Huntingdon in 1912.

In 1923 Tsen went to the United States for a year of study at Virginia Theological Seminary followed by another year at the Divinity School of the Protestant Episcopal Church in Philadelphia. He also studied at the University of Pennsylvania, where he received an MA in sociology in 1926.

== Role as bishop ==
Tsen was consecrated as assistant bishop of Honan on 23 February 1929, becoming the second Chinese diocesan bishop in an established Anglican diocese after Assistant Bishop Sing of Chekiang in 1919. In the summer of 1930, Tsen was also the first Chinese bishop to attend the Lambeth Conference. When Bishop White retired in 1935, Tsen was elevated by the House of Bishops to serve as the next Bishop of Honan.

In 1937 Tsen visited Canada with Bishop Paul Shinji Sasaki of the Nippon Sei Ko Kai to bear witness to the unity of Chinese and Japanese Christians, despite the war between the two nations.

At the end of the Second World War Tsen attended the Lambeth Conference of 1948, but was placed under house arrest immediately on his return.

For his courage and leadership of the Chinese Anglican community during the Second World War, the Calendar of saints (Anglican Church of Canada) remembers Bishop Tsen annually on February 24 (along with Bishop Paul Shinji Sasaki of Japan).
