= Anders Lago =

Swedish politician (born 1956)

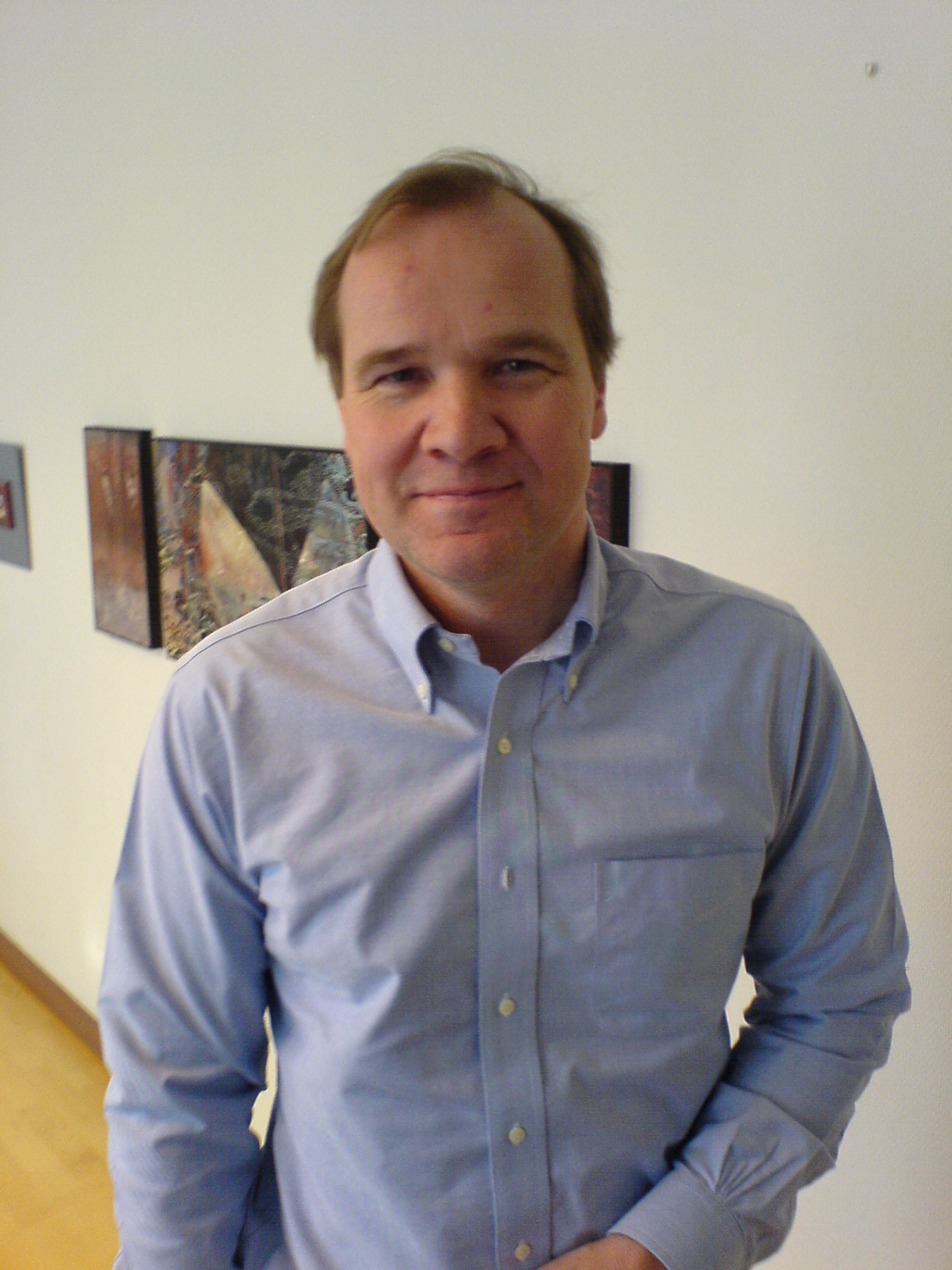

Chairman of the municipal board in Södertälje Municipality
- In office 1998–2011

Personal details
- Born: 31 October 1956
- Political party: Social Democratic

Anders Lago (born 31 October 1956) is a Swedish Social Democratic politician and former mayor (Swedish: Kommunstyrelsens ordförande) of Södertälje, Sweden. On 10 April 2008, Lago participated in a hearing before the Helsinki Commission, the independent U.S. government agency led by members of U.S. Congress, where he claimed that his small city of about 80,000 was now home to nearly 6,000 Iraqis; "more refugees than the United States and Canada together".

Lago served as mayor from 1998 to 2011.
