= Ilkka (given name) =

Ilkka is a masculine Finnish given name. Notable people with the name include:

- Ilkka Alanko (born 1969), Finnish musician
- Ilkka Auer (1930–2013), Finnish middle-distance runner
- Ilkka Hakalehto (1936–2009), Finnish historian and politician
- Ilkka Hanski (1953–2016), scientist and ecologist at Helsinki University, Finland
- Ilkka Heikkilä (born 1988), retired Finnish ice hockey centre
- Ilkka Heikkinen (born 1984), Finnish professional ice hockey defenceman
- Ilkka Heilä (born 1956), Finnish cartoonist who lives in Kaarina
- Ilkka Herlin (born 1959), Finnish billionaire
- Ilkka Herola (born 1995), Finnish Nordic combined skier
- Ilkka Jääskeläinen (born 1979), singer who won Idols Finland 2 (Finnish Pop Idol)
- Ilkka Järvi-Laturi (1961–2023), Finnish-born US-based film director
- Ilkka Kanerva (1948–2022), member of the Finnish Parliament
- Ilkka Antero Kanko (born 1934), Finnish chess player
- Ilkka Kantola (born 1957), Finnish politician and Lutheran minister
- Ilkka Koivula (born 1966), Finnish actor
- Ilkka Koski (1928–1993), Finnish boxer
- Ilkka Kuusisto (1933–2025), Finnish opera composer, conductor, choirmaster and organist
- Ilkka-Eemeli Laari (born 1989), Finnish snowboarder
- Ilkka Laitinen (1962–2019), Finnish politician
- Ilkka Lipsanen (born 1942), also known as Danny, Finnish singer and guitarist
- Ilkka Mäkelä (born 1963), Finnish football manager and former player
- Ilkka Mesikämmen (1943–2025), Finnish ice hockey player
- Ilkka Mikkola (born 1979), professional ice hockey player
- Ilkka Niiniluoto (born 1946), Finnish philosopher, mathematician, professor of philosophy at the University of Helsinki
- Ilkka Nummisto (1944–2019), Finnish sprint canoeist
- Ilkka Pastinen (1928–2018), Finnish ambassador who also served as Deputy Secretary General of the United Nations
- Ilkka Pikkarainen (born 1981), Finnish ice hockey right winger
- Ilkka Pöyhiä or World Sauna Championships, annual endurance contest held in Heinola, Finland, from 1999 to 2010
- Ilkka Pyysiäinen (born 1959), Finnish docent and doctor of theology, researching the cognitive science of religion
- Ilkka Remes (born 1962), Finnish author of thrillers and young adult literature
- Ilkka Remes (footballer) (born 1963), retired Finnish football defender
- Ilkka Ronkainen (born 1940), Finnish/American organizational theorist and Emeritus Professor at the Georgetown University
- Ilkka Ruohonen (1958–2016), Finnish cultural anthropologist and documentary film maker
- Ilkka Sarén (1940–2022), Finnish chess FIDE master
- Ilkka Sinisalo (1958–2017), former professional ice hockey player
- Ilkka Suominen (1939–2022), Finnish politician from the National Coalition Party
- Ilkka Suvanto (born 1943), Finnish former butterfly, freestyle and medley swimmer
- Ilkka Taipale (born 1942), Finnish politician, physician and activist
- Ilkka Talvi (born 1948), Finnish violinist
- Ilkka Tuomi (born 1958), Finnish computer scientist, noted for writings on the subject of the Internet
- Ilkka Tuomisto (born 1984), Finnish Paralympic cross-country skier and biathlete
- Ilkka Uimonen (born 1966), Finnish photographer and photojournalist
- Ilkka Vaarasuo (born 1983), former ice hockey defenceman
- Ilkka Vartiovaara (1946–2010), Finnish medical doctor, author, editor, artist and columnist
- Ilkka Viljanen (born 1960), Finnish politician
- Ilkka Villi (born 1975), Finnish actor
- Ilkka Juhani Virta (born 1961), Finnish rector and historian

== See also ==
- Harri Ilkka (born 1970), Finnish speed skater
- Jaakko Ilkka (1545–1597), Finnish yeoman and trader
- Jaakko Ilkka (opera), opera by Finnish composer Jorma Panula
- Ilkka-Yhtymä Oyj, Southern Ostrobothnian publishing house in Seinäjoki and Vaasa, Finland
- Ilka
