= Pohjois-Haaga =

Coordinates: 60°14′N 24°53′E

Pohjois-Haaga Norra Haga
- Helsinki Subdivision
- Position of Pohjois-Haaga within Helsinki
- Country: Finland
- Region: Uusimaa
- Sub-region: Greater Helsinki
- Municipality: Helsinki
- District: Western
- Area: 1.46 km^{2} (0.56 sq mi)
- Population: 8,466
  - Density: 5,799/km^{2} (15,020/sq mi)
- Postal codes: 00400
- Subdivision number: 293
- Neighbouring subdivisions: Etelä-Haaga, Lassila, Pirkkola, Maunulanpuisto, Kivihaka

Pohjois-Haaga (Finnish), Norra Haga (Swedish, both translate as Northern Haaga) is a neighborhood of Helsinki, Finland. On east it borders with Hämeenlinna's highway. Etelä-Haaga (Southern Haaga) is in its southern side, separated by park areas and road Metsäläntie. Lassila district is on the west side, separated by road Kaupintie and parks on the southern side of road Aku Korhosen tie. Among central places of Pohjois-Haaga is Thalianaukio (Thalia's square) with a taxi station. Light traffic bridges over Hämeenlinna's Highway connect Pohjois-Haaga to Helsinki's central park and Pirkkola's sport center.

The district has the population of around 9 500 (1.1.2014) and around 4 000 working places (2012). Many of the residents have lived in the area since its building in the 1950s. Thus the average age of residents is relatively high, many of them being over 65 years old.

The highest point of Pohjois-Haaga's territory is the rocks at the northern side of road Ida Aalbergin tie (44 metres above the sea). The lowest point is at the border of Etelä-Haaga, next to Hämeenlinna's highway (10,5 metres above the sea). The distance to the centre of Helsinki is around nine kilometres.

Pohjois-Haaga Seura ry founded in 1956 is a district level organisation of residents.

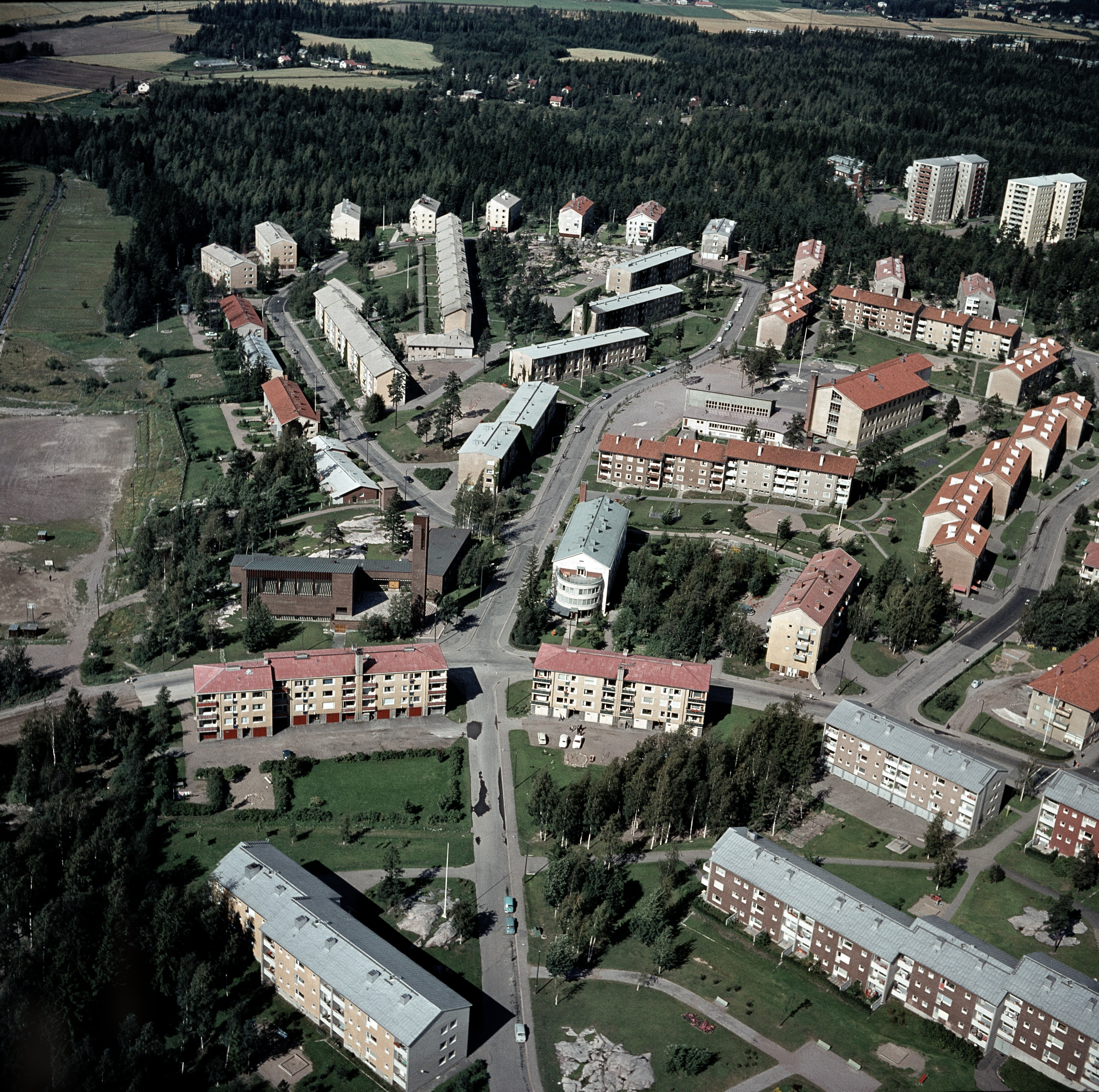
Tolarintie street in Pohjois-Haaga in 1964

== Street names ==
Most of street names in Pohjois-Haaga refer to the theatre. Area's collector road is Näyttelijäntie (actor's road) and its cross streets include ones named after famous actors Ida Aalberg, Aino Ackté and Adolf Lindfors. The area also has streets named after playwrights including Maiju Lassila, Maria Jotuni, Artturi Järviluoma and Teuvo Pakkala. Thalia square is named after the muse of dramatic arts in Greek mythology, Thalia.

However, in the south-eastern side of the area, street names such as Nuijamiestentie (cudgel men's road), Ilkantie (Ilkka's road), Poutuntie (Pouttu's road), Krankantie (Krankka's road) and Linnaleiri square (castle camp) refer to cudgel war.

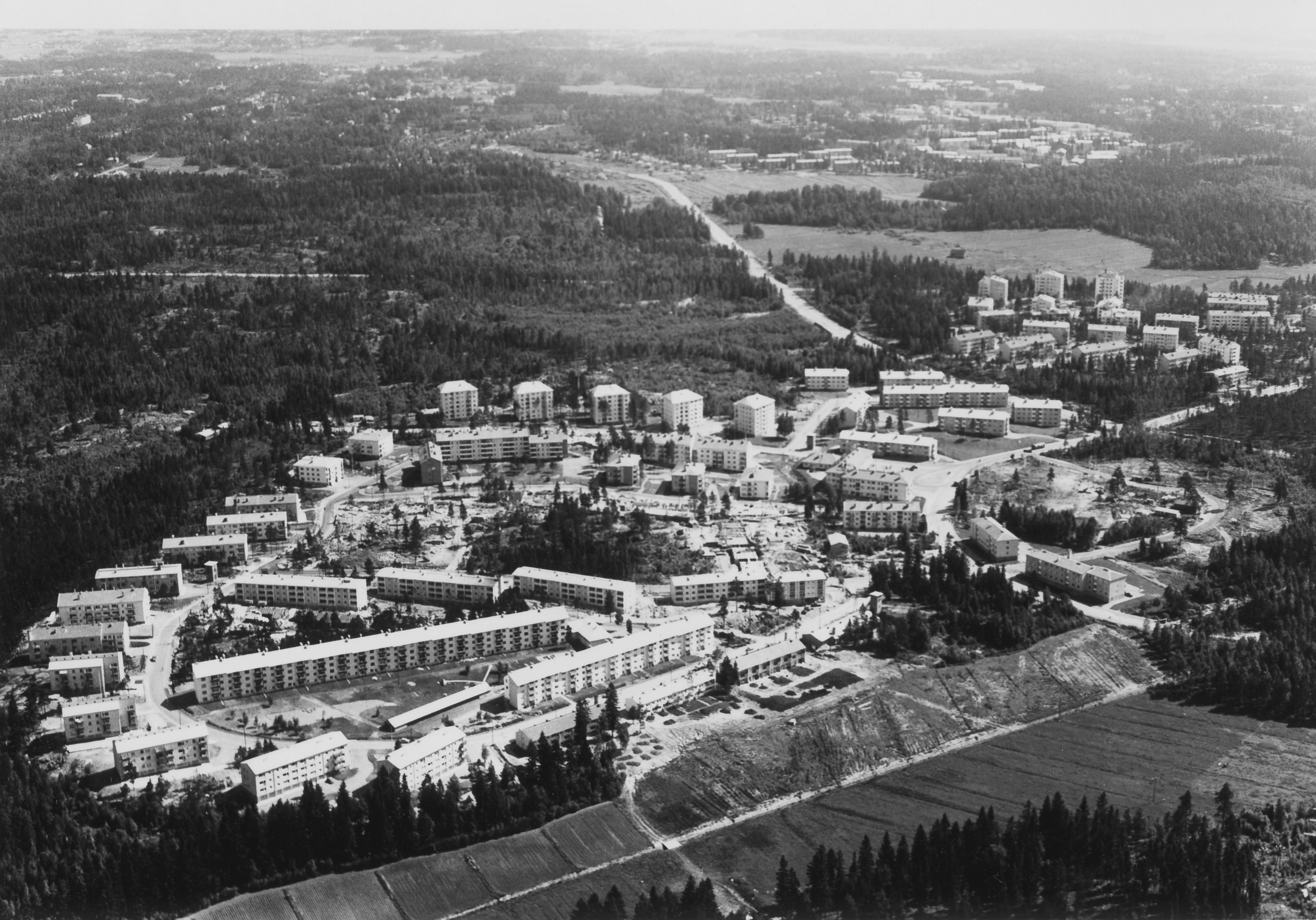
Pohjois-Haaga in 1955

== Sports ==
The following sports clubs are located in Pohjois-Haaga:

- FC Pohjois-Haagan Urheilijat
