= Jaakko Ilkka (opera) =

Opera by Jorma Panula

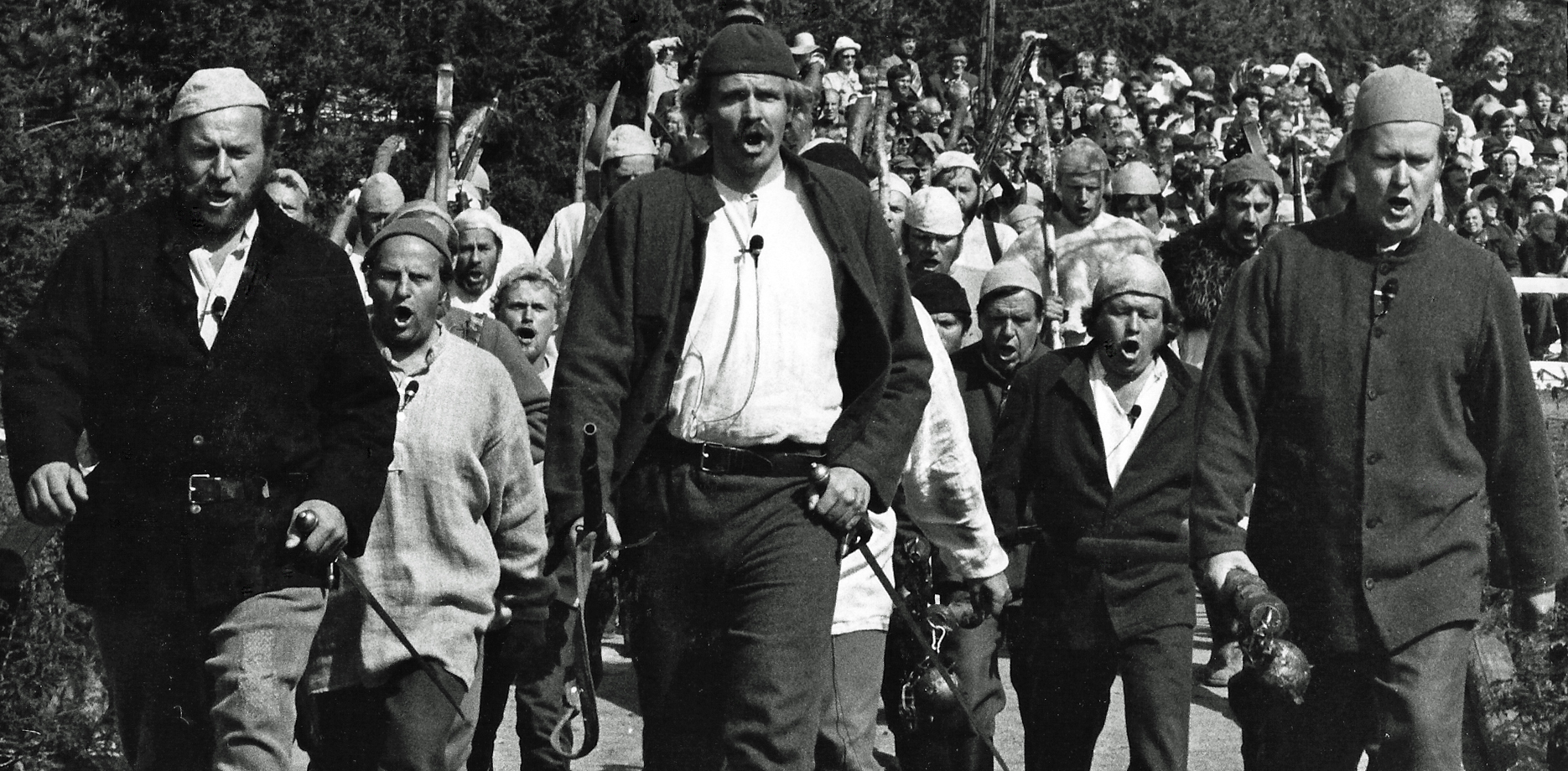
Scene from an outdoor performance of Jaakko Ilkka, dir. by Edvin Laine. Ilmajoki Music Festival, Finland, summer 1978. Front row from left: Eero Piirto (Kylmä-Jyrä), Tuomo Häkkilä (Jaakko Ilkka), and Jaakko Hietikko (?). Composed by Jorma Panula, libretto by Aarni Krohn.

Jaakko Ilkka is a folk opera by Finnish composer Jorma Panula composed in 1977–1978 which deals with the eponymous peasant leader of the 1596–1597 Cudgel War. The opera uses material from Finnish folk and fiddle music and premiered at the Ilmajoki Music Festival in 1978.

The libretto was written by Aarni Krohn. It tells the story of Jaako Ilkka, a wealthy landowner from Ilmajoki who becomes the leader of the peasant uprising against Klaus Fleming. The opera culminates with Ilkka’s defeat after having been turned on by his own troops.

Jaakko Ilkka was performed at the Ilmajoki Music Festival during the summers of 1978–1981 under the direction of Edvin Laine, featuring Tuomo Häkkilä as Jaako Ilkka. The role of Katariina was played by soprano Ritva Auvinen with baritone Jorma Falck as Klaus Flemings and bass baritone Eero Piirto Kylmä-Jyrää. Other performers included Jorma Hynninen, Jaakko Ryhänen and Jaakko Hietikko. The performances featured the Finnish National Opera Orchestra and the Ilmajoki Opera Choir under the direction of composer Jorma Panula. Costumes were designed by costumer and fashion artist Kirsti Maunula.

The opera was again performed at the Ilmajoki Music Festival in 1996–1997, featuring Jyrki Anttila as Jaakko Ilkka alongside performers Kaisa Hannula, Tommi Hakala, and Juha Uusitalo.
