= Ilkka Machine Gun Company =

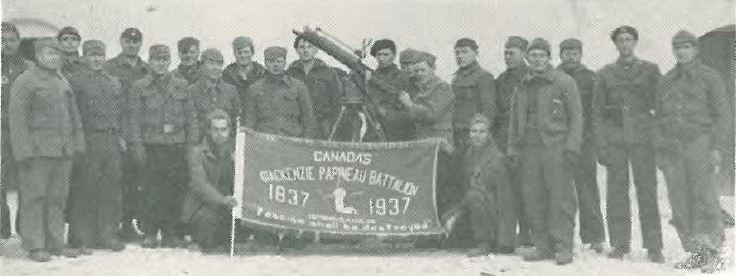
- Soldiers of the Ilkka Machine Gun Company posing with the flag of the Mackenzie–Papineau Battalion
- Active: 1937 – 23 September 1938
- Country: Canada
- Allegiance: Second Spanish Republic
- Branch: International Brigades
- Size: Company
- Part of: Mackenzie–Papineau Battalion
- Patron: Jaakko Ilkka
- Engagements: Spanish Civil War: Aragon Offensive; Battle of the Ebro

The Ilkka Machine Gun Company was a Canadian military unit composed of Finnish-Canadians that volunteered to fight on the Republican side in the Spanish Civil War.

== History ==
The Ilkka Machine Gun Company was formed in 1937 as part of the Mackenzie–Papineau Battalion. The gunners of the Company named their unit after Jaakko Ilkka, a Finnish patriot of the middle ages who revolted against Swedish rule during the Cudgel War. As part of the Mackenzie-Papineau Battalion, the Ilkka Machine Gun Company would go onto fight in some of the fiercest battles of 1937-38 and would suffer heavy casualties. During the Aragon Offensive, the Ilkka Machine Gun Company, alongside American volunteer units, successfully repelled the Nationalists. However, due to the collapse of their flanks, Ilkka Machine Gun Company, alongside the rest of the Mac-Paps withdrew. During their final engagement at the Battle of the Ebro, the Ilkka Machine Gun Company suffered several losses. On 21 September 1938, Spanish Prime Minister Juan Negrín ordered all units of the International Brigades to withdrawn from combat.
