= Virpi Talvitie =

Finnish illustrator and graphic artist

Virpi Talvitie (born 1961, in Ilmajoki) is a Finnish illustrator and graphic artist.

Talvitie graduated from high school in 1980 and received a bachelor of art degree in Art and Design in 1989. Talvitie has illustrated magazines and children's books. In 2006, she collaborated with Timo Parvela on the book Keinulauta (Seesaw), which won the Junior Finlandia Prize, a prestigious literary prize in Finland. She won the WSOY Literature Foundation award in 2010, and the Mikkeli Illustration Triennial Prize in 2011. Talvitie has also been nominated for the Hans Christian Andersen Award for illustration in 2006, 2008 and 2012.

== Illustration ==
=== Published English translations ===
- 2016: Bicycling to the Moon, 128pp., ISBN 978-1-776570-32-4

=== Selected Finnish titles ===
- Helt okej!. Kurs 1 / Siv Boström ... [et al.]; [piirrokset: Virpi Talvitie], 1998
- Ollaan ananas ja kookos : rakkausriimejä / Eppu Nuotio; kuvitus: Virpi Talvitie, 1998
- Musta Miksu, taikurikissa / Ritva Toivola; kuvittanut Virpi Talvitie, 1999
- Harmaaviirullinen Silli / Raili Mikkanen; kuvittanut Virpi Talvitie, 2000
- Elina kesyttää tiikerin / Ben Furman; kuvittanut Virpi Talvitie, 2001
- Timjami ja kadonnut kompassi / Tittamari Marttinen; kuvittanut Virpi Talvitie, 2001
- Matka joulun taloon : joulun satuja ja runoja / Hannele Huovi; kuvittanut Virpi Talvitie, 2001
- Epsukepsu / kirjoittanut Eppu Nuotio; kuvittanut Virpi Talvitie, 2002
- Joona ja yllätysten matkalaukku / Tittamari Marttinen; kuvittanut Virpi Talvitie, 2002
- Kivikauppaa ja ketunleipiä / Katri Tapola; kuvittanut Virpi Talvitie, 2002
- Lumottu lipas / Leena Laulajainen; kuvittanut Virpi Talvitie, 2002
- Äidin karkkipäivä / kirjoittanut Tittamari Marttinen; kuvittanut Virpi Talvitie, 2003
- Talot ovat yksin kotona : pohjoismaisia runoja lapsille, 2003
- Konnanmontulle hyvä kyyti /Katri Tapola; kuvittanut Virpi Talvitie, 2003
- Satu joka oli totta / kirjoittanut Katri Tapola; kuvittanut Virpi Talvitie, 2004
- Onnenpäiviä : runoja lapsen juhlaan / [koonnut] Päivi Heikkilä-Halttunen; [kirjoittajat:] Tittamari Marttinen [et al.]; kuvittanut Virpi Talvitie, 2005
- Siitä ei kukaan tiedä : kertomuksia / Maria Vuorio; kuvittanut Virpi Talvitie, 2005
- Jääpuikkoja ja jälkiä lumessa / Katri Tapola; kuvittanut Virpi Talvitie, 2005
- Auringon lapset : adoptiolapsemme Kolumbiasta, Etiopiasta ja Thaimaasta / [teksti:] Maija Karjalainen, Pia Nynäs, Tytti Tuunanen; [piirrokset:] Virpi Talvitie, 2005
