= Väinö Tikkaoja =

Finnish politician (1909–1964)

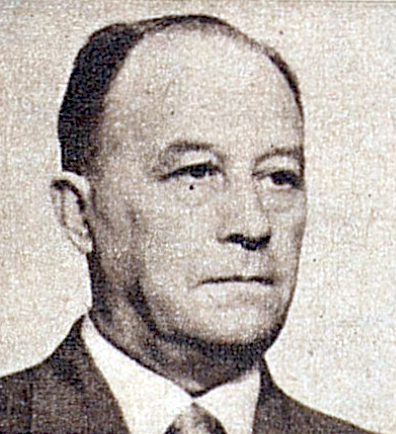
Väinö Tikkaoja

Väinö Iisakki Tikkaoja (26 September 1909 – 30 January 1964) was a Finnish politician, born in Ilmajoki. He was a member of the Parliament of Finland from 1951 until his death in 1964, representing the Social Democratic Party of Finland (SDP). He was a presidential elector in the 1950, 1956 and 1962 presidential elections.
