= Iisakki Saha =

Finnish goldsmith and politician (1865–1924)

Iisak (Iisakki) Saha (8 May 1865 – 13 December 1924) was a Finnish goldsmith and politician, born in Ilmajoki. He was a member of the Parliament of Finland from 1913 to 1916, representing the Finnish Party.
