= Timo Parvela =

Finnish writer

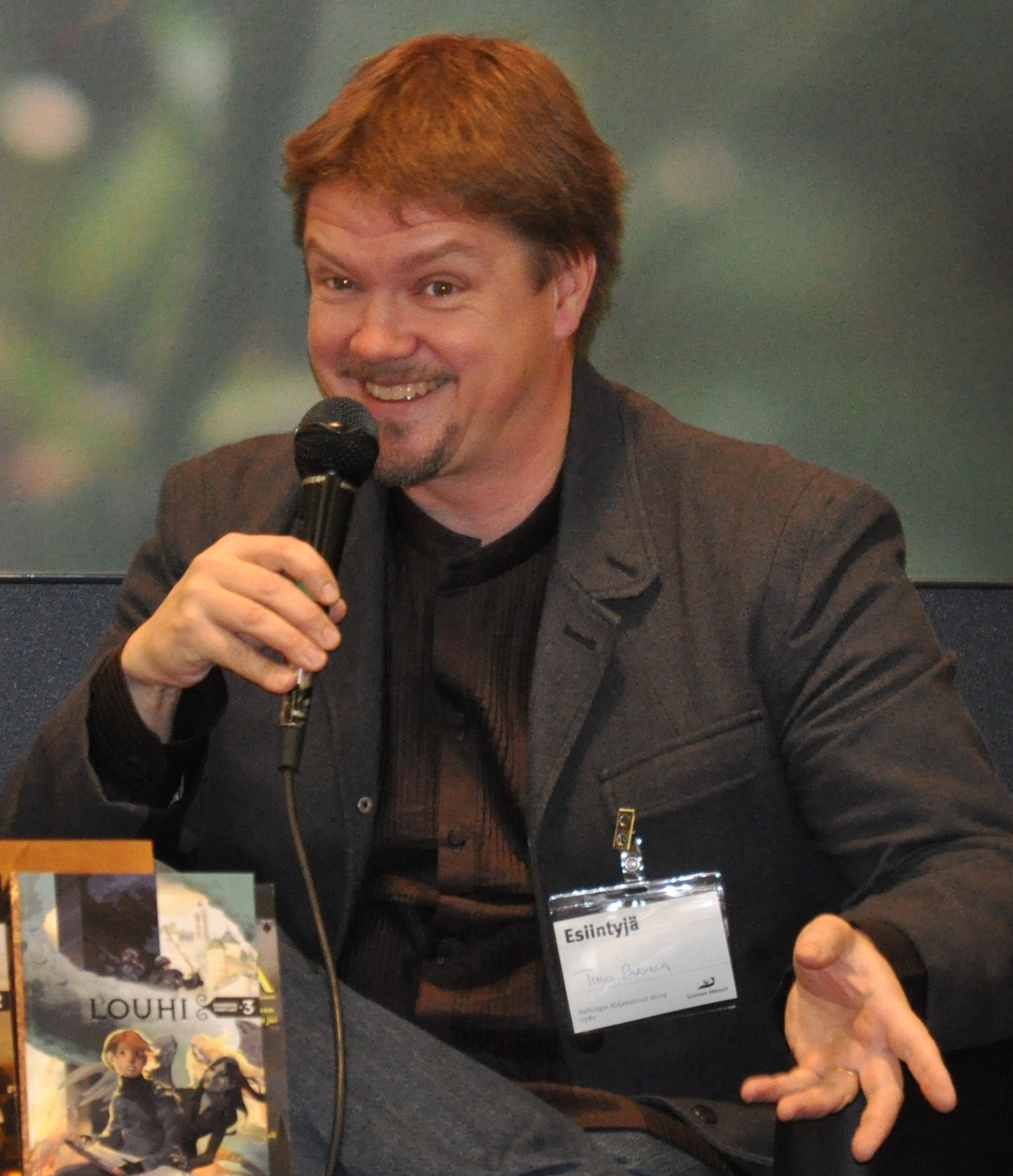
Timo Parvela at the annual Helsinki Book Fair in 2009.

Timo Parvela (born 19 May 1964 in Jyväskylä) is a Finnish author of juvenile fiction.

Parvela matriculated from secondary school in 1983 and graduated from Jyväskylä Teacher Training College in 1988. He worked at a series of elementary school teaching posts for six years — first in Petäjävesi in the Jyväskylä sub-region and later in Espoo — until the mid-1990s. Since 1996 he has been a freelance writer.

In addition to numerous children's books he has written television screenplays both for children's audiences and for adults, as well as scripts for Finnish radio.

== Brief story summaries ==
In Poika (1989) an uncertain Everyboy, who communicates more easily with his grandfather and with his dog than with his parents, meets Everygirl.

Keinulauta ("Seesaw", 2006) portrays Pii, a lonely girl meditatively seeking a second person to sit on the empty end of her seesaw.

== Recurring-character series ==
One of Parvela's series relates the adventures of the twins Anna and Antti, but he is perhaps most popular for his series of Ella books, which are prescribed as school readers in his native Finland. The focus of the latter series is Ella, a primary-school student who tells of her daily life and schooling. In the series are at least 18 books, a few of which have been translated from Finnish into German and Polish. All of the German translations have been recorded as audiobooks as well. In Ella luokkaretkellä ("Ella's class trip", 1997), for example, a solicitous teacher, concerned that each schoolchild's day pack is aboard the bus, forgets his own bag in the schoolyard; travelling without money, the class's adventures during the outing to the city are humorously narrated by seven-year-old Ella.

Producer Juha Wuolijoki is also planning a film, based on some of the books in the Ella series, to be directed by Taneli Mustonen. Wuolijoki expects filming to begin in the summer of 2011.

Other popular characters created by Timo Parvela are Maukka and Väykkä. Maukka is a cat and Väykkä is a dog and they live in a sky blue house on the top of the hill. Below the hill there is a village where their friends live. Maukka and Väykkä are totally different characters and their life is familiar and safe but also crazy and fun. Books feature many kind of topics from getting old ("Maukka, Väykkä ja Karhu Murhinen", 2012) to being the first and being famous ("Maukan ja Väykän satukirja", 2013). Maukka and Väykkä books are targeted for children around 3–7 years and adults can also enjoy reading them as they describe everyday events in a very truthful and compassionate way. There are 9 Maukka and Väykkä books created by Timo Parvela. Books have been translated into German, Japanese, and Chinese. All books are illustrated by Virpi Talvitie, a Finnish illustrator and graphic artist.

== Selected works ==
=== Books in Finnish ===
- 1989: Poika ("A boy"). ISBN 978-951-31-2133-4.
- 1990: Puhuva koira ("The talking dog"). ISBN 978-951-30-9519-2
- 1992: Pelkotiloja ("Anxiety")
- 1993: Pikkuveljet ja taika-avain ("Little brothers and the magic key")
- 1994: Ohutta yläpilveä ("Cirrus clouds")
- 1995: Hilma ja Pingviini ("Hilma and the penguin")
- 1996: Isäni on supermies ("My dad the superman")
- 1997: Ella luokkaretkellä ("Ella's class trip") ISBN 951-31-1063-X
- 1999: Ansa ja Oiva ("Ansa and Oiva")
- 2000: Outo juttu ("A strange tale")
- 2000: Ansa ja Oiva suurkaupungissa ("Ansa and Oiva in the city"). ISBN 978-951-0-24894-2
- 2001: Sanoo isä ("Dad says")
- 2002: Mitä siihen sanot, isä? ("What do you say, dad?")
- 2004: Hilma ja täydellinen lemmikkieläin ("Hilma and her perfect pet")
- 2005: Hilma ja hyvä harrastus ("Hilma and her fine hobby")
- 2006: Keinulauta ("Seesaw"). ISBN 978-951-0-31901-7

=== School texts ===
- 2002: Tammen Kultainen aapinen ("Golden oak primer")
- 2003: Tammen Kultainen lukukirja ("Golden oak reader")

=== Published German translations ===
- 2007: Ella in der Schule ("Ella at school"), Carl Hanser-Verlag, 144 pp., ISBN 978-3-446-20893-3
- 2008: Ella in der zweiten Klasse ("Ella in second grade"), Carl Hanser-Verlag, 160 pp., ISBN 978-3-446-23110-8
- 2009: Ella auf Klassenfahrt (originally Ella luokkaretkellä (1997), "Ella's class trip"), Carl Hanser-Verlag, 160 pp., ISBN 978-3-446-23385-0; also available as an audio CD read by Friedheim Ptok. Igel Records, ISBN 978-3-89353-284-1
- 2010: Ella und der Superstar, Carl Hanser-Verlag, 160 pp., ISBN 978-3-446-23590-8; also available as an audio CD read by Friedheim Ptok. Igel Records, ISBN 978-3-89353-330-5

=== Published English translations ===
- 2016: Bicycling to the Moon, 128pp., ISBN 978-1-776570-32-4

== Awards ==
- 1991: Central Finland Regional Arts Award
- 1992: One of the IBBY Honour List awardees for his 1989 book Poika ("A boy"), of which the judging committee wrote, "The author shows an extraordinary command of modern Finnish, and he conveys his protagonist's thoughts in fresh and authentic language not often found in books for young people."
- 2000: One of the IBBY Honour List awardees for his 1997 book Ella luokkaretkellä ("Ella's class trip").
- 2006: Finlandia Junior Award (€26,000) for children's and youth literature, for Keinulauta ("Seesaw"), a prize shared equally by his illustrator Virpi Talvitie, who helped develop the idea for the book. Contest judge Jukka Virtanen praised Keinulauta as "exciting, funny, wise and beautiful."
