= Alajoki =

Agricultural plain in the Kyrönjoki basin, Finland

Coordinates: 62.79988°N 22.67006°E

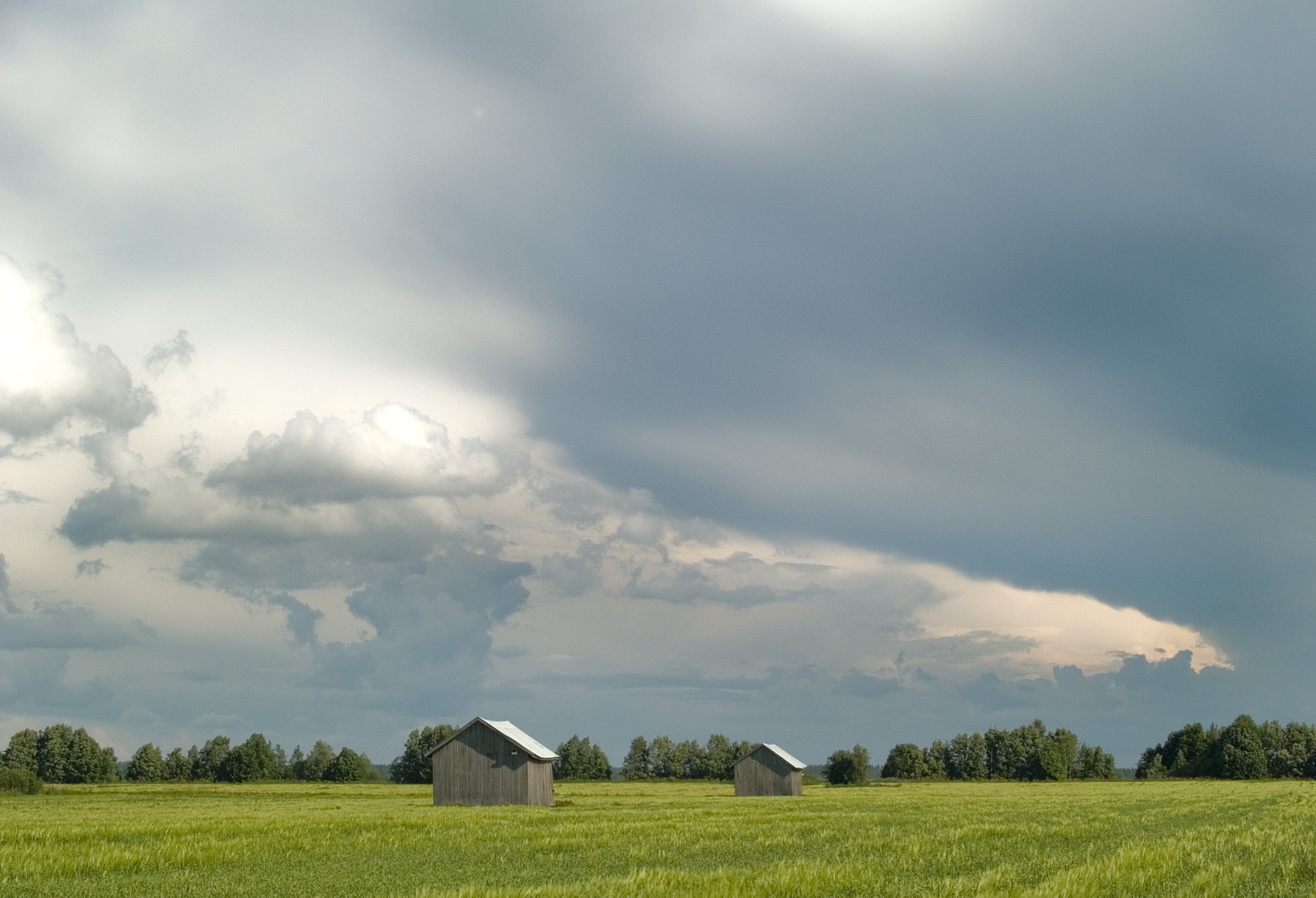
Old barns on the Alajoki plain.

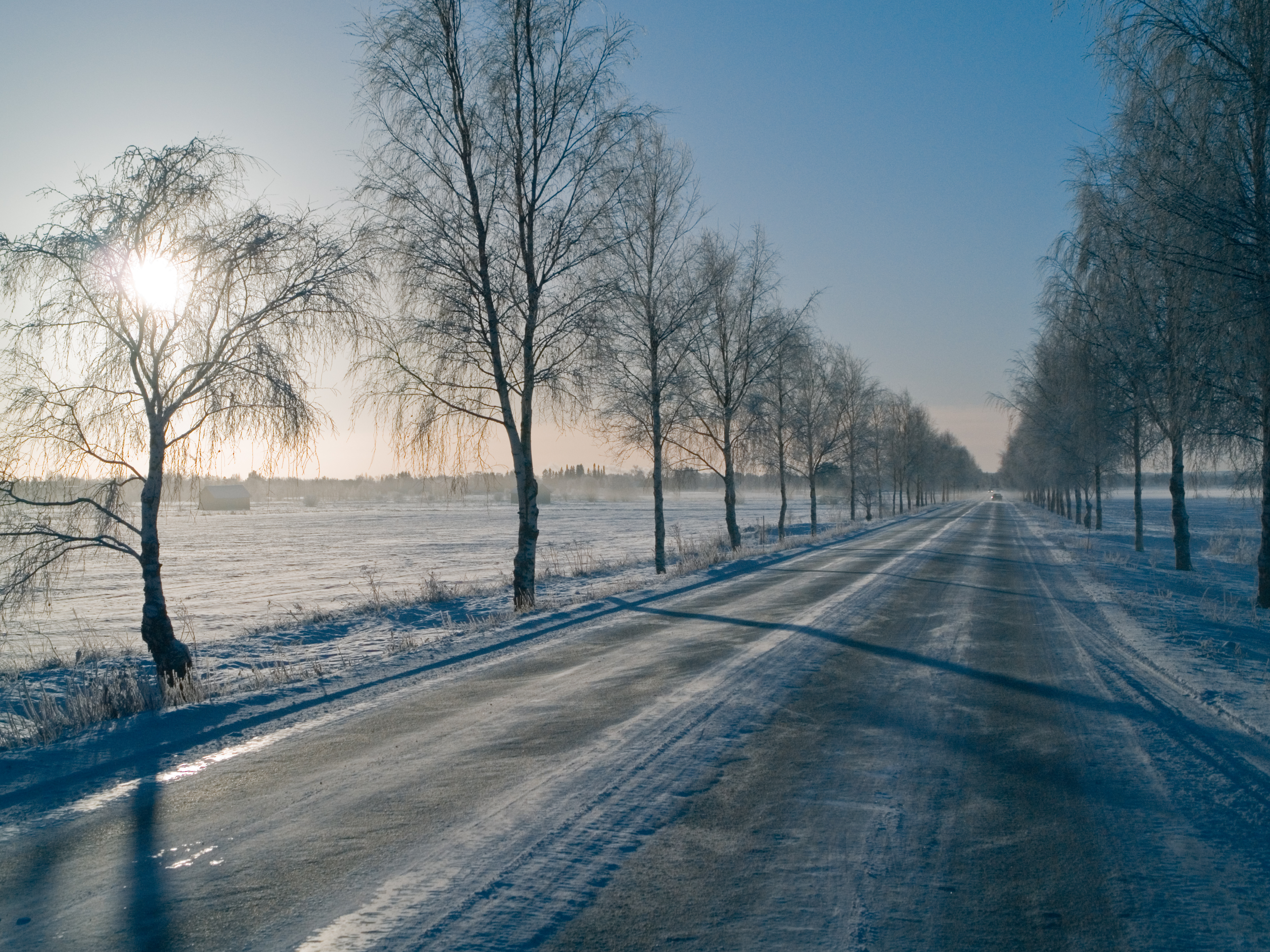
Birch-lined Road 7000 runs through the Vaivaastenneva area in Alajoki.

Alajoki is an agricultural plain along the Kyrönjoki river in the municipalities of Ilmajoki and Seinäjoki in the province of Ostrobothnia in western Finland. It consists of old marshes which were dried out in the early 1800s and then transformed into arable land through slash-and-burn farming and by spreading clay on the burned peat. In the 20th century, the slowly sinking soil of Alajoki was notorious for its spring floods which are now largely prevented by various flood control methods along the Kyrönjoki river The fields are best suited for growing hay and other fodder, which has promoted livestock care in the Ilmajoki area.

In 1995, the Finnish National Board of Antiquities listed Alajoki as one of Finland's nationally valuable landscapes.

The Alajoki plain is up to five kilometers wide and covers approximately 8,000 hectares. In the southwest it consists of the villages Röyskölä, Fossila, Nikkola and Pirilä north of Ilmajoki's center. In the western and northern part of Alajoki, the bordering villages include Harjunmäki, Könni, Munakka, Katila, and Niemistö. The southern border of the Alajoki area is formed by the railway and road 67, both running from Seinäjoki to Kaskinen on the Finnish west coast. The eastern part of Alajoki is located on the north side of Seinäjoki city center where the river Seinäjoki meets the Kyrönjoki river.

== Barns and "sauna" huts ==
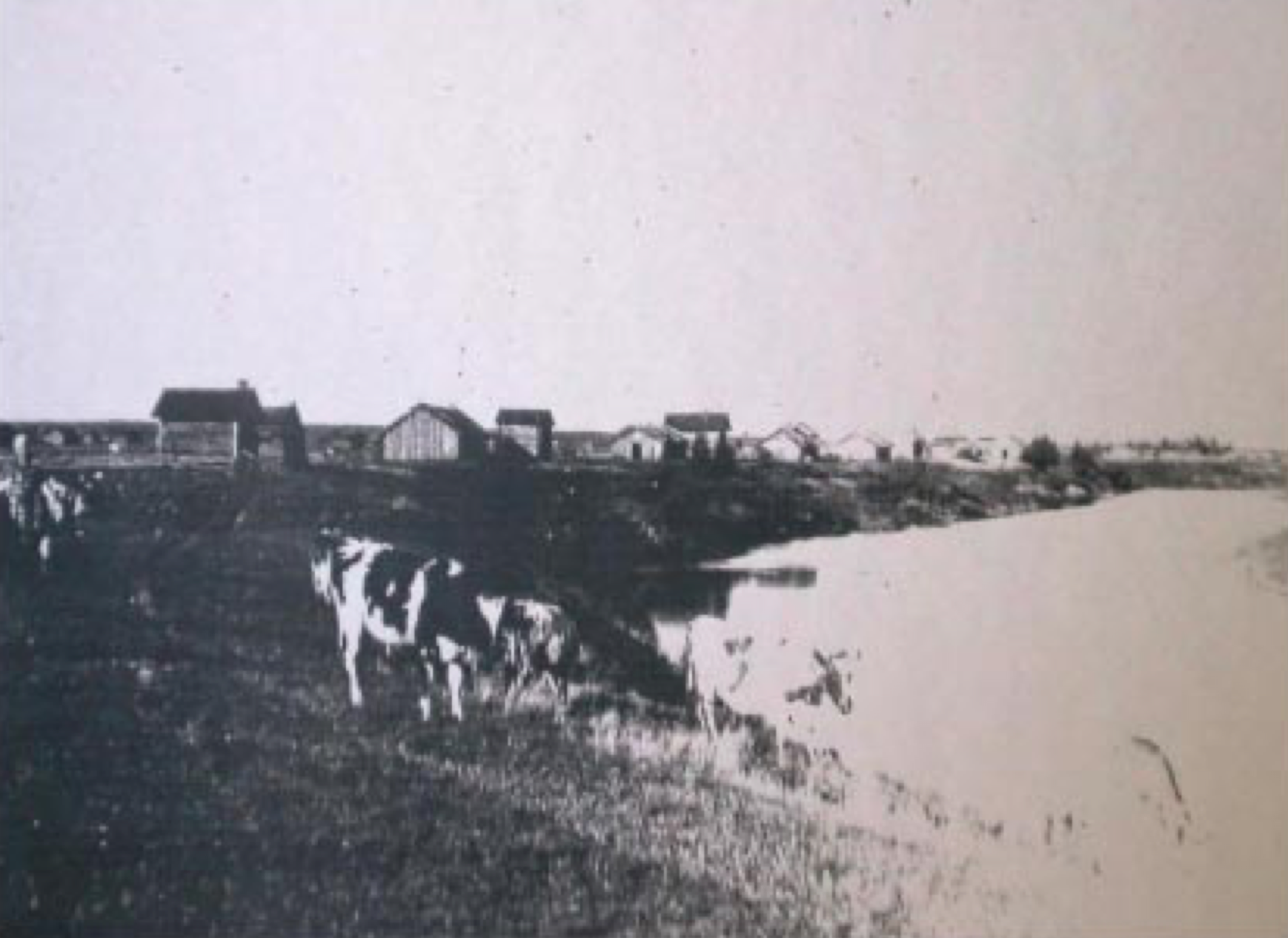
River saunas in the 1930s.

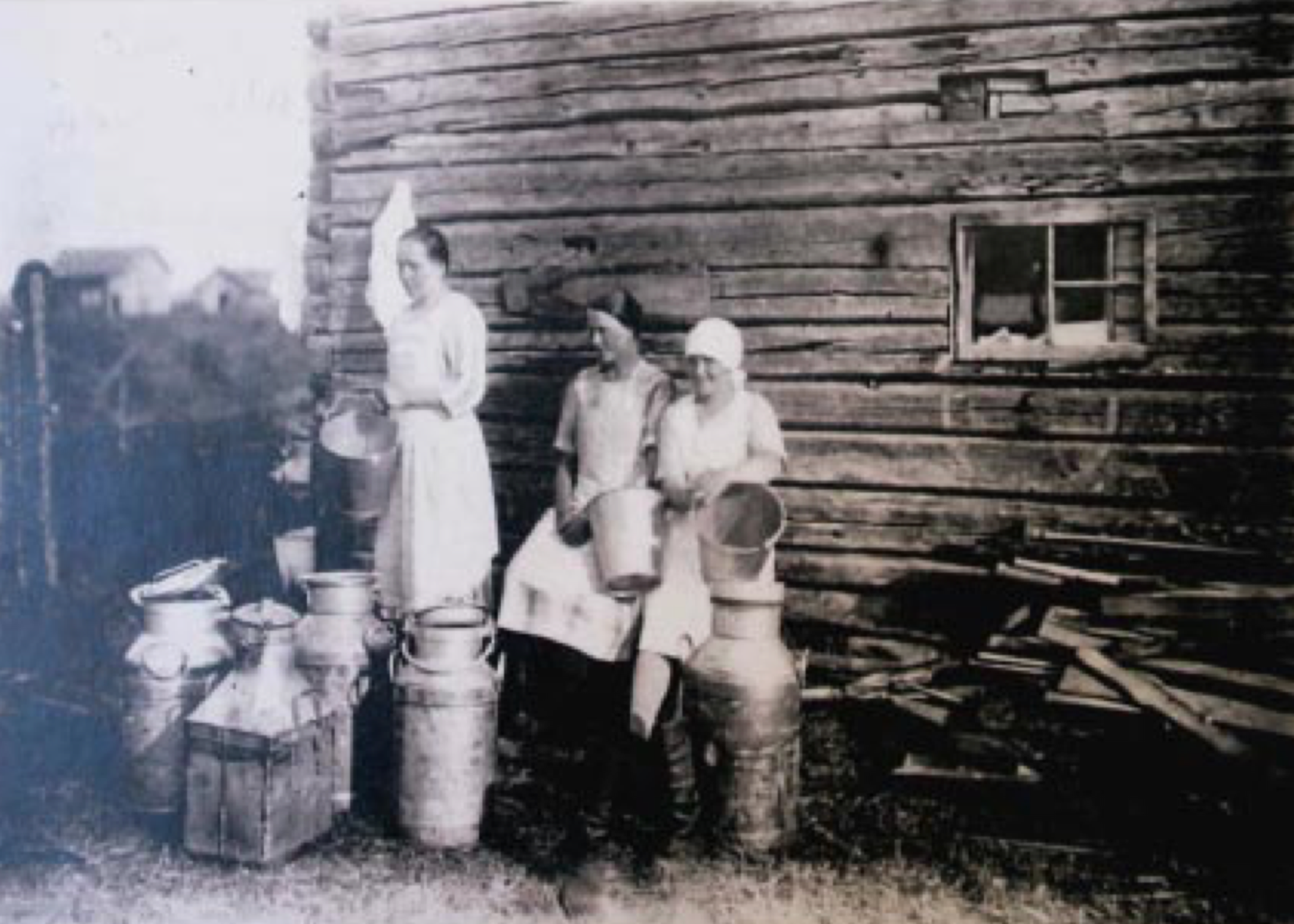
Alajoki dairywomen in the 1920s.

Alajoki used to be famous for hundreds of simple barn buildings for hay storage scattered on the plain, now mostly gone. Another typical building type for the area were the "Alajoki saunas", small huts along the Kyronjoki river where field workers and cow milkers would stay and socialize during the busy summer months. Despite their name, most huts did not in fact include a sauna stove. The name may derive from the fact that many of the log-frame huts were previously used as sauna buildings at farms and then disassembled, drawn by horses to the riverside and put together again for accommodation.

The need for such temporary accommodation became obsolete by the 1960s when roads had improved and motorised vehicles were used for daily trips to the Alajoki farmlands. Only about a dozen of the huts have survived, most of them in a river bend called Laivanpäänmukka.
