= Erkki Ala-Könni =

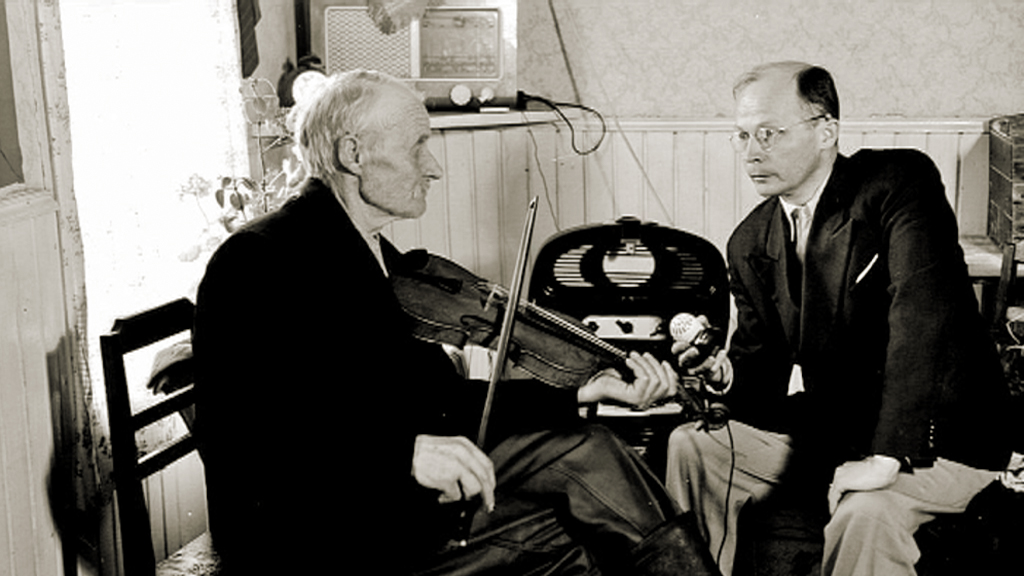
Erkki Ala-Könni recording a Finnish folk musician in 1956.

Martti Erik (Erkki) Ala-Könni (2 February 1911, Ilmajoki – 2 September 1996, Tampere) was a Finnish university professor, ethnomusicologist, researcher, and recorder of Finnish folklore. He received a doctorate degree in folk music in 1956 from the University of Helsinki with a dissertation Die Polska-Tänze in Finnland and directed the Department of Folk Tradition (currently the Department of Music Anthropology) of the University of Tampere in 1965–1976.

Erkki Ala-Könni accumulated a significant collection of traditional Finnish musical instruments, folk music, and hymns, and took more than 100,000 folklore-related photograph slides and negatives. Together with Martti Pokela he contributed to the revival of the Finnish traditional musical instrument kantele when folk music began its resurgence in the 1960s.

Ala-Könni, known for his motto "Magnum animum labori inspira", was from Ilmajoki where he has a memorial, and he remained as an active friend and supporter of the Ostrobothnian culture throughout his life. He was one of the founders of the Kaustinen Folk Music Festival.
