= Santavuori (hill) =

Hill in Finland

Coordinates: 62.652677°N 22.48028°E

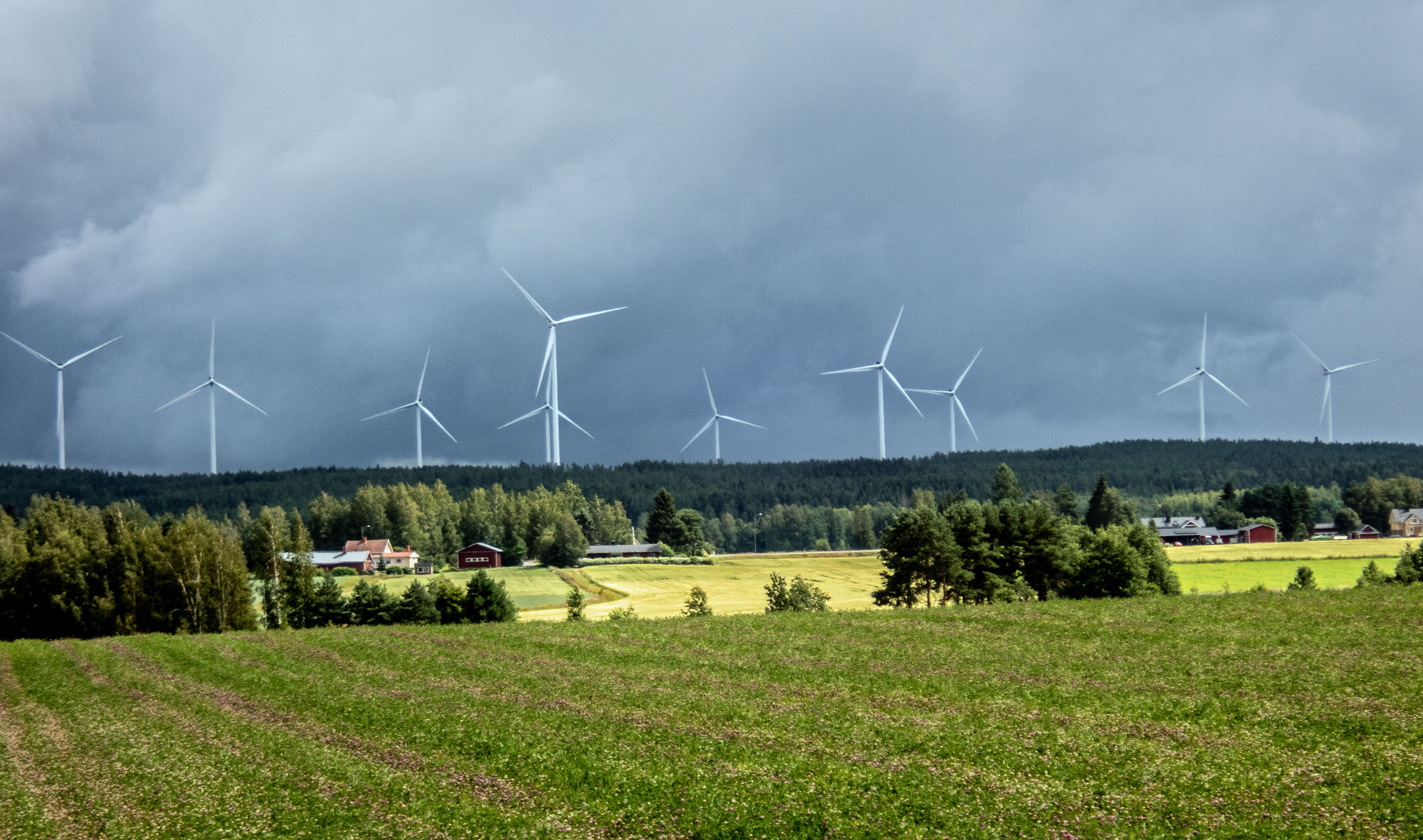
Santavuori, as of July 2023

Santavuori is a hill in Ilmajoki municipality, South Ostrobothnia. It rises 145 metres above sea level.

In 2009, assessment began for a wind farm containing approximately 20 wind turbines to be constructed on the hill. Construction began on the Santavuori Wind Park in 2015, and concluded in 2016, with 17 wind turbines being completed. Santavuori was given its name in 1597, during the Cudgel War.
