= Ilkka Vartiovaara =

Finnish medical doctor, author, editor, artist and columnist

Ilkka Juhani Vartiovaara (February 14, 1946 in Helsinki – April 10, 2010 in Vantaa) was a Finnish medical doctor, author, editor, artist and columnist. He specialized in psychiatry, but never worked as a psychiatrist, because he was more keen on being a writer. He served as the editor in chief of Medisiinari, Suomen Lääkärilehti (Finnish Medical Journal) and Terveys 2000. He also illustrated these publications with his drawings.

Vartiovaara authored more than 20 books, including both medical textbooks and collections of his magazine columns and essays discussing medicine from a more humanistic perspective. Several of these titles were about stress and burnout, a concept he is credited for originally bringing to Finland in 1984.

Despite negative Lyme antibody tests, Vartiovaara believed he was infected with Lyme disease on a conference trip to Vancouver. He believed he was the first well-known Lyme patient in Finland. Vartiovaara wrote about his battle with symptoms attributed to Lyme in his book Delfiinin laulu (The song of the dolphin) and in a letter published in The Lancet. Vartiovaara died at the age of 64.
