= Ilkka Juhani Virta =

Finnish rector and historian (born 1961)

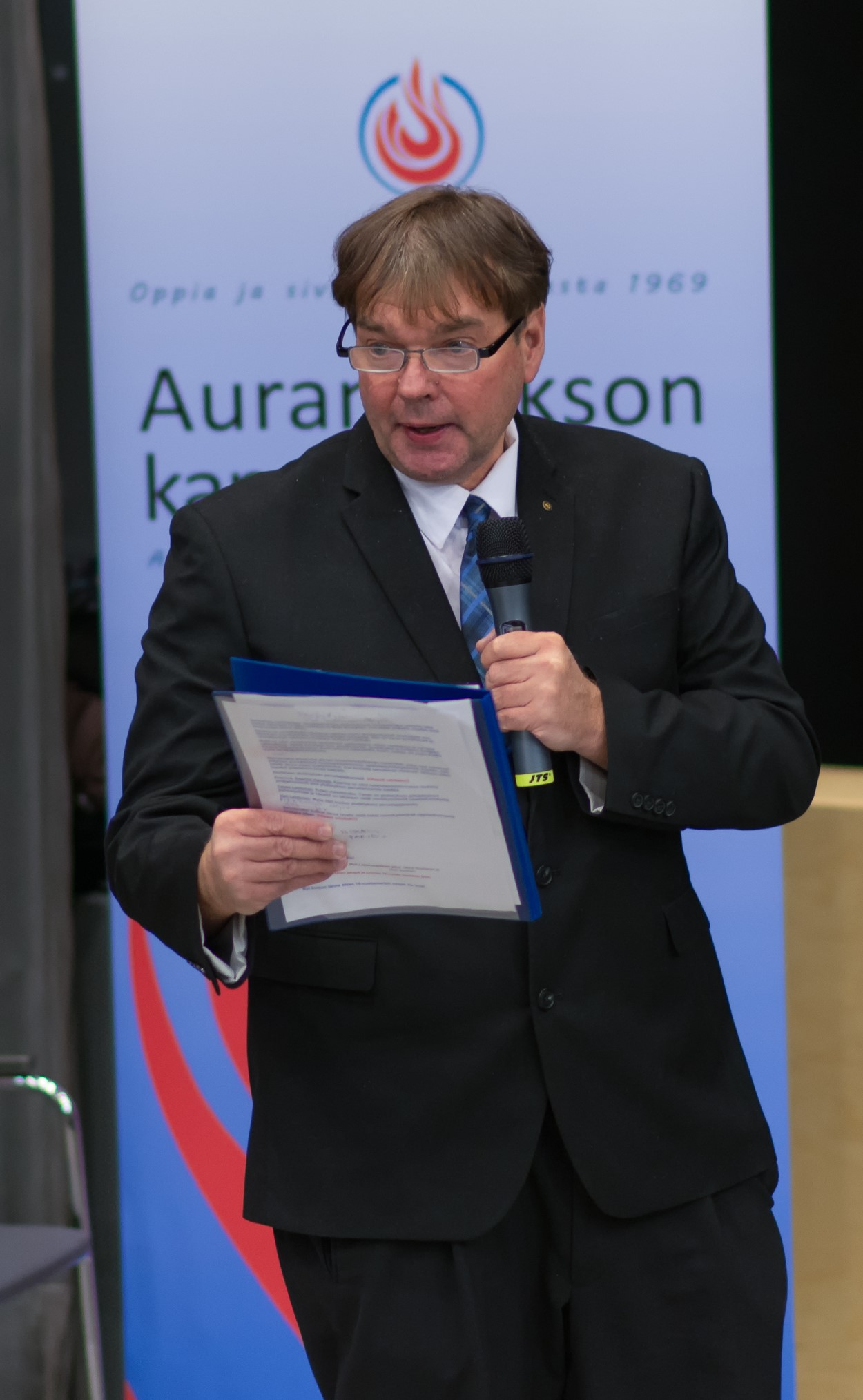
- Born: 1961; Vammala, Finland
- Education: University of Turku
- Scientific career
- Thesis: Siirtoväen kansakoulukysymys sotavuosien Suomessa. (2001)

Ilkka Juhani Virta (born 1961) is a Finnish rector and historian. Ilkka Virta has worked as a rector of the Pyhäjärvi Region Adult' College, the Finnish Adult Education Centre of Turku, the Loimaa Workers' College and the Auranlaakso Citizens' College.

Ilkka Virta completed his master's degree in 1989 and his licentiate degree in 1995. He defended his dissertation in University of Turku in the spring of 2001 from the issue of immigrant primary school during the war in Finland. Virta's dissertation explains, based on the archival sources, how the adequacy of primary teachers and the resources of schoolchildren were ensured in Finland in 1939–1945.

As part of the activities of these educational institutions, he has organized several history seminars and series of presentations, where the lecturers have been front-line lecturers and writers. Virta himself has lectured on topics related to both the history of education and the history of the surrendered Karelian parishes, and is particularly interested in the history of Vyborg (Viipuri), of which he has also published a few works.

== Thesis publications ==
- Siirtoväen kansakoulukysymys sotavuosien Suomessa (The issue of immigrant primary school during the war in Finland), Doctor thesis, 2001, Turun yliopiston julkaisuja Sarja C, osa 169. Turku. 313 sivua. ISBN 951-29-1948-6.

== Selected works ==
- Virta Ilkka: Viipurin Vilkka. Ylietsivä V.J. Rissasen suku, työ ja perhe-elämä (Chief detective V.J. Rissanen's family, work and family life.). Turku 2008. 257 sivua. ISBN 978-952-92-3496-7.
- Virta Ilkka: Sattumuksia 1920-luvun Viipurissa – Kieltolakirikkomuksia, murhia, onnettomuuksia, hukkumisia ja tapainturmellusta (Coincidences in 1920s Vyborg – Prohibitions, murders, accidents, drownings and vandalism). Vaasa 2020. 286 sivua. ISBN 978-952-94-3722-1.
- Virta Ilkka: Viipurin poliisilaitoksen historiaa 1836–1944 (History of the Vyborg Police Department 1836–1944). Vaasa 2021. 255 sivua. ISBN 978-952-94-4608-7.
