= Pentti Pouttu =

Rebel leader during the Cudgel War (died 1597)

Pentti Pouttu, also known as Bengt Pouttu, died 1597 in Turku, Sweden (now Finland) was a Finnish/Swedish peasant rebellion leader, landowner and merchant with Swedish origin from Gammelgården (Old farm) in Karleby, Ostrobothnia. He was one of the leaders of the 1596/97 peasant uprising, the Cudgel War. The year of Pouttu's birth is unknown.

== Biography ==
Pouttu was known as the "political leader" of the cudgel war, since he was one of the first peasant leader who organized the resistance in Storkyro and sailed to Stockholm to complain to Duke Charles (Hertig Karl). Since a peasant rebellion in Ostrobothnia would benefit his plan to take over the rule from Sigismund, (king of Poland and Sweden) he signed a letter giving the peasants right to stop the injustices. Although this didn't help much and a few years later in August 1596 they did another trip to Stockholm and was told by duke Charles to "Answer violence with violence, and chase away those unlawful residents". Then the cudgel war was a reality, a former soldier in the Swedish army and wealthy landowner Jaakko Ilkka took command of the peasant army. It is said that Pouttu should have complained since he had more experience leading the rebellion. Although he had no formal combat training and was of Swedish origin, which was a disadvantage since most of the peasant rebels were Finnish speaking.

After Jaakko Ilkka was chosen as the leader they agreed that Pouttu should take charge of the Swedish-speaking peasants along the coast, recruiting them along the way and marsh towards Turku castle where the two peasant armies should meet. Although only about 200 of the Swedish-speaking population joined the Cudgel war. This must have been expected, since they didn't suffer as much as for example the Finnish speaking population near the Russian border. Pouttu must also have known that an armed rebellion was a suicide mission, and he was promoting negotiation instead of violence. Although he had an early success in evicting some soldiers occupying his home in Pouttula near Storkyro.

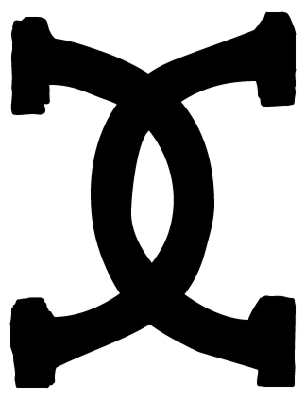
Pouttu's mark

They were marching from Ostrobothnia to the province of Satakunta. On 20 December 1596, Pouttu and his men reached the Anola mansion in Ulvila. Their intention was to persuade the colonel Axel Kurck to join the rebellions, but he stayed loyal to the king Sigismund III. The peasants were beaten by Kurck's cavalry and Pouttu was captured. He was held at the Turku castle, where Pouttu is said to have been "eaten by fleas" and probably died in 1597.

Pouttu was the only peasant leader not publicly executed but was held as a prisoner of war at Turku castle, and the exact time of death is unknown, but probably in 1597 considering his old age. At the time of his death, he was approximately 50–60 years old.

== Sources ==
- Ylikangas, Heikki: Nuijasota, p. 172–190. Otava Publishing 1996. ISBN 951-11425-3-4.
- Klubbekriget - det blodiga bondekriget i Finland 1596-97 av Heikki Ylikangas
