= Ilkka Pyysiäinen =

Finnish docent and doctor of theology (born 1959)

Ilkka Eljas Pyysiäinen
- Born: 9 July 1959 (age 67)
- Scientific career
- Fields: Cognitive science of religion
- Workplaces: University of Helsinki
- Thesis: Beyond language and reason: Mysticism in Indian Buddhism (1993)

Ilkka Eljas Pyysiäinen (born July 9, 1959) is a Finnish docent and doctor of theology, whose research has focused on cognitive science of religion. He has also studied religious thinking, religious language, and religious experience. Pyysiäinen is also known as an atheist and a critic of religion.

== Views ==
In cognitive theology, Ilkka Pyysiäinen explores categories, language, consciousness and religious concepts as part of human thinking. For example, he explores 'God' as a cognitive category of human data processing, or thinking, that has been used in many contexts throughout history. Pyysiäisen that "god" is located outside the class at the same time a limited and everything inside of comprehensive, which is real and behavior and experience, when a person feels (reality) border. At the same time, according to him, it sits where human knowledge and understanding ceases and functions as a class independent of other classes of thought, as it serves as the conceptual boundary between reality and non-reality.

According to Ilkka Pyysiäinen, the term "religion" is a misleading abstract concept for which there is no clear operationalized definition in theology. This is why the talk of converting religion to something else is misleading. In his view, however, reduction in science is necessary because all scientific knowledge is reduced in some sense of the term. Religious science can increase scientific knowledge about religious phenomena, but it is inherent in science that it always ignores something and is point-of-view.

Ilkka Pyysiäinen has criticized the fideist view of religion. According to Fideists, religions do not claim anything about reality, but are, instead, a kind of internal depiction of people's mental movements. Pyysiäinen points out that the majority of believers have always thought that their religious concepts and beliefs point to reality and are true. Theologians' claims about the symbolism of religious doctrines are the result of scientific progress, an attempt to save religion before science. It is reasonable to say in the petition that religious beliefs contain concepts of reality that are at odds with science. Religion is part of everyday thought, which is in contradiction with science in much the same way as many other ideas of everyday thought.

== Works ==
=== Books ===
- — (1986). Ymmärtämisen aave? Kokemuksellisuus uskonnon tarkastelussa [The ghost of understanding? Experiences in religion] (in Finnish). Mythos.
- — (1988). Perimmäiset kuvat: Buddhan elämäkerran merkitys theravadan kaanonissa [Ultimate images: The importance of Buddha's life story in the Pāli Canon] (in Finnish). Missiologian ja ekumeniikan seura. ISBN 951-95207-8-3.
- Pyysiäinen, Ilkka (1993). Beyond language and reason: Mysticism in Indian Buddhism. Finnish Academy of Science and Letters. ISBN 951-41-0709-8. OCLC 260208391.
- — (1993). Ilo pitkästä itkusta: Buddhalaisuus ja terapiat [The joy of a long cry: Buddhism and therapies] (in Finnish). Yliopistopaino. ISBN 951-570-147-3.
- — (1997). Jumalan selitys: 'jumala' kognitiivisena kategoriana [An explanation of God: 'God' as a cognitive category] (in Finnish). Helsingissa: Otava. ISBN 951-1-14940-7. OCLC 58306169.
- — (2001). Harvat ja valitut : kirjoituksia ihmismielestä ja uskonnosta [Selected writings on human mind and religion] (in Finnish). Helsinki: Yliopistopaino. ISBN 951-570-494-4. OCLC 925777976.
- — (2005). Synti : ajatuksin, sanoin ja töin [Sin: Through thoughts, words, and deeds] (in Finnish). Helsinki: WSOY. ISBN 951-0-30141-8. OCLC 76847612.
- — (2006). Jumalten keinu: Kiertoajelu uskontotieteessä] [The swing of the gods: A tour of religion] (in Finnish). Gaudeamus. ISBN 951-662-987-3.
- — (2010). Jumalaa ei ole [There is no God] (in Finnish). Tampere: Vastapaino. ISBN 978-951-768-324-1. OCLC 693807928.

=== Edited books ===
- Meurman-Solin, Anneli; Pyysiäinen, Ilkka, eds. (2005). Ihmistieteet tänään [Humanities today] (in Finnish). Helsinki: Gaudemus: Helsinki University Press / Helsinki Collegium for Advanced Studies. ISBN 978-951-662-935-6. OCLC 500100897.
- Ketola, Kimmo; Pyysiäinen, Ilkka; Sjöblom, Tom, eds. (2008). Uskonto ja ihmismieli johdatus kognitiiviseen uskontotieteeseen [Religion and the human mind: An introduction to the cognitive science of religion] (in Finnish). Helsinki: Gaudeamus: Helsinki University Press. ISBN 978-952-495-007-7. OCLC 231195510.
