= Jorma Panula =

Finnish conductor and composer (born 1930)

Jorma Juhani Panula
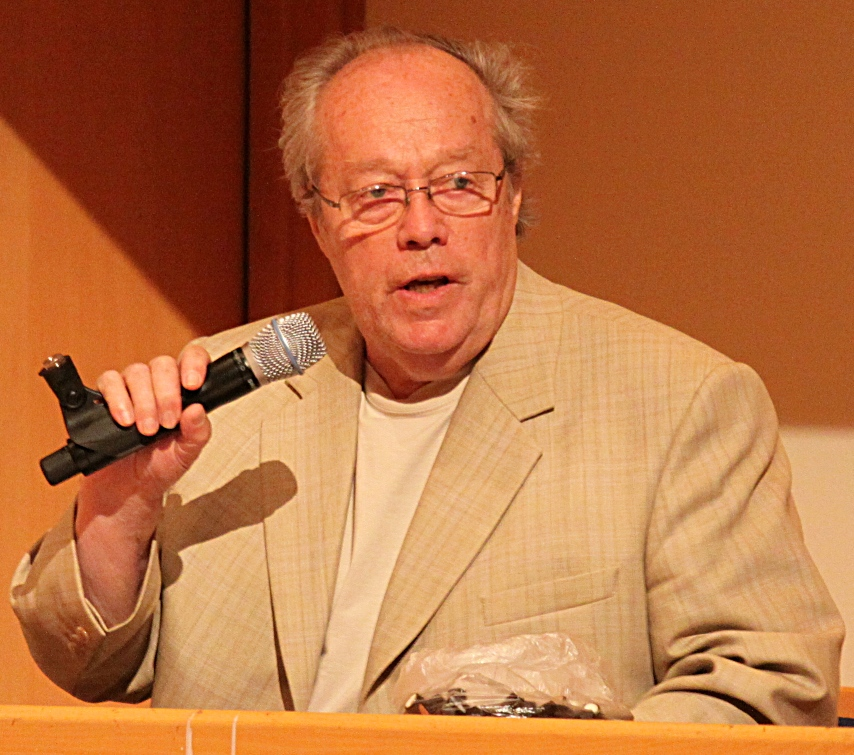
- Jorma Panula in 2009
- Born: 10 August 1930 (age 96); Kauhajoki, Finland
- Education: Sibelius Academy
- Occupations: Conductor; Composer
- Organizations: Turku Philharmonic Orchestra; Helsinki Philharmonic Orchestra; Aarhus Symphony Orchestra; Sibelius Academy; Royal College of Music in Stockholm; Royal Danish Academy of Music
- Parent(s): Elis Matias Panula, Elsa (Huhtinen) Panula

Jorma Juhani Panula (born 10 August 1930) is a Finnish conductor, composer, and teacher of conducting. He has mentored many Finnish conductors, such as Esa-Pekka Salonen, Mikko Franck, Sakari Oramo, Jukka-Pekka Saraste, Osmo Vänskä, Klaus Mäkelä and Tarmo Peltokoski.

== Career ==
Panula was born in Kauhajoki, Finland, the son of violinist Elis Matias Panula and his wife Elsa (Huhtinen) Panula. He studied church music and conducting at the Sibelius Academy. His teachers included Leo Funtek, Dean Dixon, Albert Wolff and Franco Ferrara. Apart from conducting, he has composed a wide variety of music. His operas Jaakko Ilkka and the River Opera established a new genre called "performance opera", which fused music, visual art and the art of daily life. Panula's other compositions include musicals, church music, a violin concerto, jazz capriccio and numerous pieces of vocal music.

Panula was the artistic director and chief conductor of the Turku Philharmonic Orchestra from 1963 to 1965, the Helsinki Philharmonic Orchestra from 1965 to 1972 and the Aarhus Symphony Orchestra from 1973 to 1976. He has also conducted his own opera Jaakko Ilkka at the Finnish National Opera.

Panula has served as Professor of Conducting at the Sibelius Academy in Helsinki from 1973 to 1994 and at the Royal College of Music in Stockholm and the Royal Danish Academy of Music in Copenhagen. As a pedagogue, Panula has been a teacher and mentor to many Finnish and other conductors, including Esa-Pekka Salonen, Mikko Franck, Sakari Oramo, Jukka-Pekka Saraste, Osmo Vänskä, Dalia Stasevska, Ricardo Chiavetta, Denis Mastromonaco, Santtu-Matias Rouvali, Klaus Mäkelä, Matthias Manasi, and Tarmo Peltokoski.

Panula has taught conducting courses all over the world, including in Paris, London, Amsterdam, Moscow, New York, Tanglewood, Aspen, Ottawa and Sydney. He was listed as one of the "60 most powerful people in music" featured in the November 2000 issue of BBC Music Magazine. Panula was awarded the Rolf Schock Prize in 1997. He conducted the Helsinki City Symphony Orchestra in the première in December 1971 of the first symphony by Aulis Sallinen.

In March 2014, Panula caused controversy in a Finnish television interview with remarks that denigrated the ability of women to conduct particular composers, and that women were suited to conducting music that was "feminine enough", such as Debussy, but that they were unsuited for conducting Bruckner. He stated that "women [conductors]… Of course they are trying! Some of them are making faces, sweating and fussing, but it is not getting any better – only worse!... It's not a problem – if they choose the right pieces. If they take more feminine music... This is a purely biological question." Other conductors, such as his former student Salonen, responded critically to Panula's remarks.

Preceded by Ole Edgren	Turku Philharmonic Orchestra; 1963–1965	Succeeded by Paavo Rautio
Preceded by Tauno Hannikainen	Music Director, Helsinki Philharmonic Orchestra; 1965–1972	Succeeded by Paavo Berglund
Preceded by Per Dreier	Principal Conductor, Aarhus Symphony Orchestra; 1973–1976	Succeeded by Ole Schmidt
