= Ilmajoki =

Ilmajoki Ilmola
- Municipality
- Ilmajoen kunta Ilmola kommun
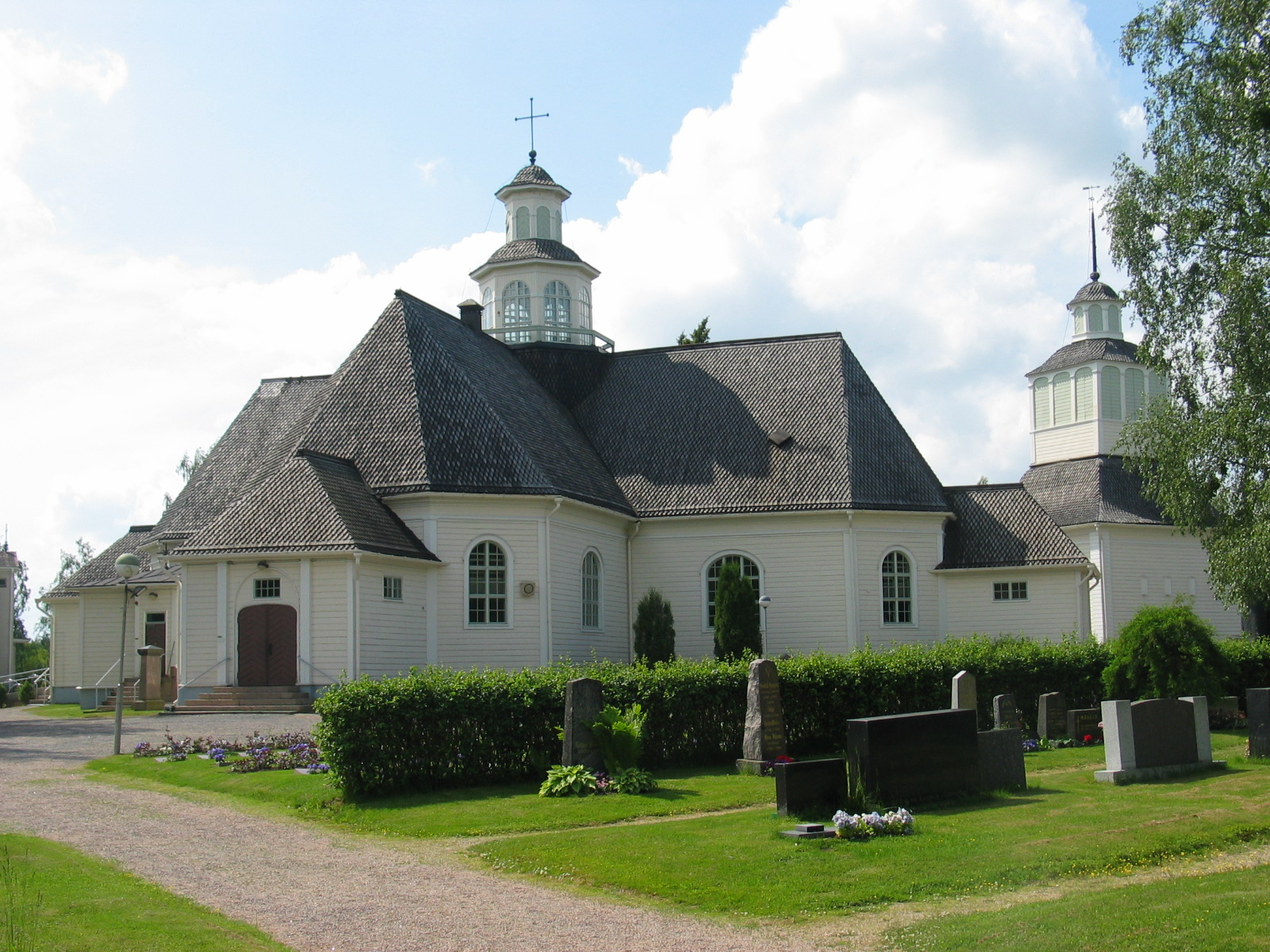
- Ilmajoki church

- Coat of arms

- Location of Ilmajoki in Finland
- Interactive map of Ilmajoki
- Coordinates: 62°44′N 022°35′E
- Country: Finland
- Region: South Ostrobothnia
- Sub-region: Seinäjoki
- Founded: 1865

Government
  - Municipality manager: Ari-Pekka Laitalainen

Area (2018-01-01)
  - Total: 579.68 km^{2} (223.82 sq mi)
  - Land: 576.74 km^{2} (222.68 sq mi)
  - Water: 2.9 km^{2} (1.1 sq mi)
  - Rank: 147th largest in Finland

Population (2025-12-31)
  - Total: 12,405
  - Rank: 82nd largest in Finland
  - Density: 21.51/km^{2} (55.7/sq mi)

Population by native language
  - Finnish: 97.8% (official)
  - Swedish: 0.2%
  - Others: 2%

Population by age
  - 0 to 14: 19.4%
  - 15 to 64: 58.4%
  - 65 or older: 22.2%
- Time zone: UTC+02:00 (EET)
  - Summer (DST): UTC+03:00 (EEST)
- Website: ilmajoki.fi

Ilmajoki (Finnish: [ˈilmɑˌjoki]; Swedish: Ilmola) is a municipality of Finland. Ilmajoki is a town and municipality situated in Finland's South Ostrobothnia region, founded in 1865. Ilmajoki has a population of 12,165 (28. February 2017) and covers an area of 579.79 km^{2} (223.86 sq mi), of which 2.89 km^{2} (1.12 sq mi) is water. The population density is 20.2 inhabitants per square kilometre (52.3 per sq mi). Ilmajoki borders the municipalities of Isokyrö, Kurikka, Laihia and Seinäjoki. The municipality is unilingually Finnish.

The population of Ilmajoki has increased by 700 over the past year (vuosi), with one in five inhabitants being under 14 years of age. Ilmajoki's tax rate is the lowest in all of South Ostrobothnia at 20.24% (average in South Ostrobothnia is 21.23%). Ilmajoki's production of renewable electricity exceeds it consumption of electricity.

Each June, thousands of people gather for opera, organized annually by Ilmajoki Music Festival. Plenty of sightseeing opportunities exist for those interested in history. Successful athletes from Ilmajoki include Olympic javelin thrower Tero Pitkämäki and Finnish former wrestler Marko Yli-Hannuksela.

== Geography ==
The geographic location of Ilmajoki is surrounded by nature and a scenic view of northern open countryside. Kyrönjoki River, South Ostrobothnia's largest river, flows onto the shores of Finland's largest fields. Kyrönjoki has been chosen as one of the National Landscapes of Finland.

== History ==
Ilmajoki existed as a part of other municipalities in South Ostrobothnia, as has been the case for Kyrö/Kyrönjoensuu/Pohjankyrö which presently exist together as Isokyrö's civil parish. Ilmajoki's congregation was established under Isokyrö's civil parish, and extended to the areas of present-day Alavus, Jalasjärvi, Kauhajoki, Kurikka, Peräseinäjoki and Seinäjoki. In 1532, the Ilmajoki area gained independence, and Ilmajoki's civil parish was founded. To compare, this occurred in Kyrö at a much later time in the 1550s. Ilmajoki held its first trials in 1554. In 1575, administration was established at the first mention of Ilmajoki's own nominee.

Greater-Ilmajoki has since been independent of Alavus, Jalasjärvi, Kauhajoki, Kurikka, Peräseinäjoki and Seinäjoki. As stipulated by a municipal decree in 1867, the municipality of Ilmajoki began operating on its own, following the municipal administration's separation from the church.

During the Cudgel War in the years 1596–1597, Jaakko Ilkka from Ilmajoki led the peasants as their leader but was executed by his opponents in January 1597. The following month, the war's final and largest engagement, the Battle of Santavuori, took place in Ilmajoki.

There are also a number of original one-and-half-story houses, as well as two-story houses traditionally seen in the South Ostrobothnia region. Grandfather clocks were manufactured in Ilmajoki, and a concentration of blacksmiths specialized in horse carriages developed in the village of Nopankylä – both of which portray aspects of Ilmajoki's long-standing traditions in construction and design.

== Economy ==
Business and entrepreneurship have long been traditions in Ilmajoki, with nearly 1,000 companies. Ilmajoki has repeatedly been rated as one of the top entrepreneurial municipalities, according to an annual survey conducted by South Ostrobothnia's Federation of Finnish Enterprise (Yrittäjät). The municipality also maintains a highly advanced bio and environmental economy.

The largest industrial plant is Altia’s Koskenkorva manufacturing plant, which produces ethanol as a raw material for Koskenkorva viina, a clear spirit drink in Finland. Also known as “Kossu”, Koskenkorva has become one of Finland's most recognized brands, domestically and internationally.

A privately owned airport that meets international standards is situated in Ilmajoki's village of Rengonkylä. The busy traffic route between Seinäjoki and Kaskinen runs through Ilmajoki. The distance from Ilmajoki to Seinäjoki is 17 km, to Vaasa 70 km, to Tampere 150 km and to Helsinki 360 km.

== Sights ==
- Ilkka's Field and the Ilkka Statue, erected in 1924, as well as Lakeuden Raivaajapatsas Statue, erected in 1954
- Memorial to Jaakko Ilkka's House in Koskenkorva
- Yli-Laurosela House Museum, which exemplifies the carpentry skill in old South Ostrobothnia houses
- Ilmajoki Museum
- Alajoki's scenic fields and river landscapes
- Santavuori and its wind turbines
- The Grove of Tuoresluoma, protected under Western Finland's Environmental Administration
- Tuoresluoma, Luokasmäki's Natural Spring, Hassulanneva's Natural Spring and Kilsukylä's Natural Spring – all of which are valued small bodies of water, according to Western Finland's Environmental Administration
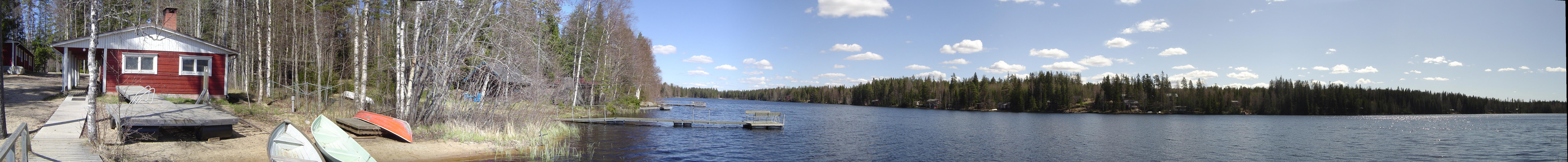
Kalajaisjärvi, the only lake in Ilmajoki

== Notable individuals ==
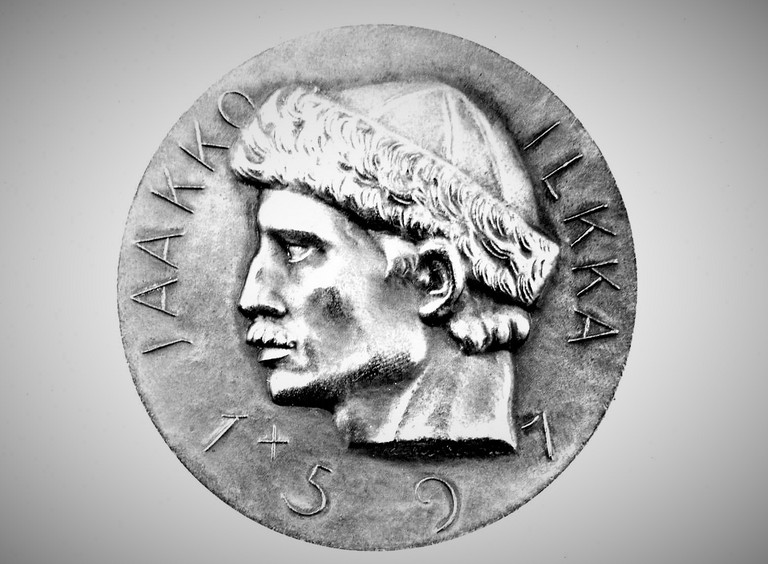
Jaakko Ilkka in a bronze commemorative coin

- Ahti Rytkönen, linguist and professor
- Antti Rytkönen, writer
- Arvo Haavisto, Olympic wrestler
- Bartholdus Vhaël, grammar writer
- Eino Rautavaara, opera singer
- Erkki Ala-Könni, professor, ethnomusicologist, researcher and recorder of Finnish folklore
- Erkki Kiskola, mayor of Ilmajoki
- Erkko Kivikoski, film director and screenwriter
- Gabriel Peldan, priest, vicar and guerilla soldier
- Gabriel Peldanus, vicar
- Gustaf Gabriel Hällström, scientist
- Hannu-Pekka Björkman, actor
- Iisakki Saha, goldsmith and German consul
- Jaakko Ilkka, trader and Cudgel War leader
- Jaakko Pöyry, industrialist
- Jarkko Ala-Huikku, Olympic wrestler
- Juho Forsell, painter
- Jukka Vieno, writer
- Jussi Kiikeri, baseball player
- Jussi Rintamäki, sprinter and hurdler
- Katarina Peltola, teacher
- Katri Tapola, writer
- Lasse Lintala, musician and music conductor
- Marja-Leena Mäkelä, librarian and writer
- Marko Yli-Hannuksela, wrestler
- Matti Järviharju, politician, entrepreneur and sea captain
- Matti Mäkelä, essayist and writer
- Matti Paasivuori, politician
- Mauri Pyhälahti, former baseball player
- Nándor Mikola, artist
- Otto-Iivari Meurman, architect
- Paavo Korpisaari, Member of Parliament and politician
- Pauli Aaltonen, sculptor
- Päivi Tapola, writer
- Riitta Korpela, singer
- Salomon Hannelius, priest
- Sanna Aaltonen, weaver
- Tero Pitkämäki, javelin thrower
- Timo Tuominen, actor
- Tuulikki Schreck, actor and teacher
- Valentin Annala, politician
- Veikko Peräsalo, athlete
- Vieno Saaristo, actor
- Virpi Talvitie, illustrator and graphic artist
- Väinö Tikkaoja, politician
- William Alatalo, racing driver
