= Jaakko Ilkka =

Finnish rebel leader during the Cudgel War (c. 1555–1597)

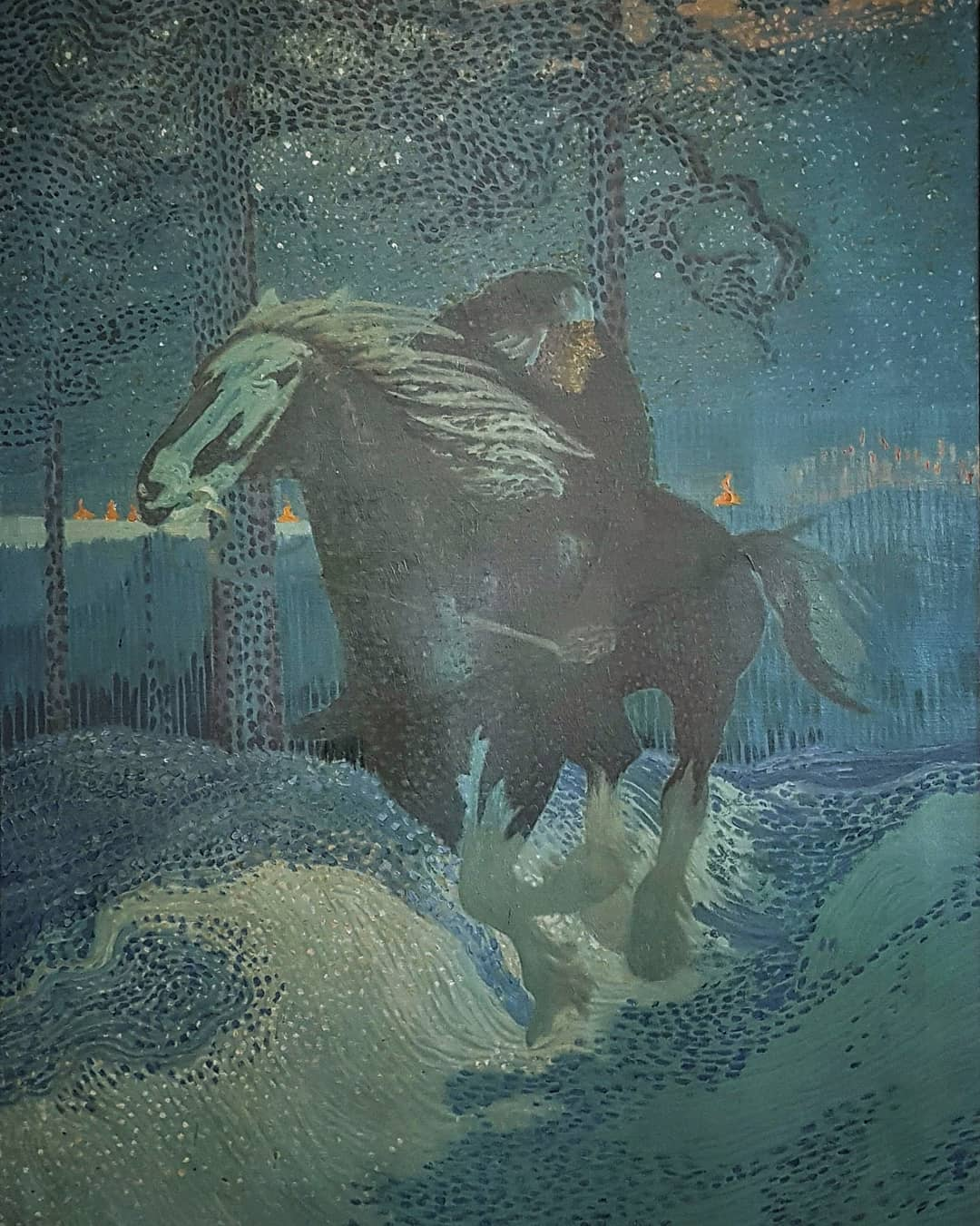
The Escape of Jaakko Ilkka by Joseph Alanen

Jaakko Pentinpoika Ilkka (1550s in Ilmajoki – late January 1597 in Isokyrö) was a wealthy Ostrobothnian landowner and leader of the Cudgel War, a 16th-century Finnish peasant revolt against Swedish rule.

== Life ==
=== Early years ===
Ilkka's father, Pentti, was the second largest landowner in Ilmajoki, South Ostrobothnia, Finland. After his father's death, Ilkka, an accomplished horseman among his many other talents, took over the family business in 1585. He moved around the country making land deals for some years. Ilkka was also the owner of a ship, and visited Tallinn and Stockholm upon it. He was twice married, and had three sons. He was a soldier in the Swedish army during the Russian war of 1591—94, but joined the peasant rebellion and Cudgel War soon thereafter.

=== The Cudgel War ===
In 1595, the whole of Ostrobothnia was in revolt, with peasants refusing to pay crippling taxes owed to the Swedish crown. Ilkka led the peasants' resistance movement. The name "The Cudgel War" came from the fact that the rebels armed themselves with various blunt weapons, such as cudgels, flails and maces, which were considered the most efficient weapons against their heavily armoured enemies. The wealthier rebels also had swords, some firearms and two cannons at their disposal. Their opponents, the troops of the Swedish nobleman Klaus Fleming, were professional, heavily armed and outnumbered the peasants.

Ilkka--who, like most educated Finns, was bilingual in Swedish (spoken by the nobility) and Finnish (spoken by the peasants)--rose to prominence after being elected to lead the peasant army. The Cudgel War began on Christmas Eve 1595 and was initially successful, with the rebels winning some infantry battles, forcing Fleming into peace negotiations. On December 31, 1596, Fleming's troops attacked Ilkka's land at his Nokia manor stronghold in Pirkkala. After the fortress had been set ablaze by the Swedes, Fleming called on the rebels to surrender Ilkka to him to avoid being killed en masse. However, Ilkka escaped with his wife and some of his men back to Ilmajoki. Fleming's cavalry killed a number of the fleeing rebels in the forests around Nokia.

Ilkka and his wife were eventually captured and imprisoned in Turku Castle. The couple managed an audacious escape, in the autumn of 1596, helped by peasant allies. According to some reports, Ilkka got out of the castle from a privy by crawling through the opening used for the removal of slops. Historian Santeri Ivalo describes this in his book Finnish heroes. Nevertheless, Ilkka was captured again and was executed with five other rebel leaders on January 27, 1597, by Swedish army officer Abraham Melkiorsson. A letter written by Fleming on January 27, 1597, ordering his troops to capture Ilkka alive, reached Melkiorsson after he had already killed the rebel leader. Eventually, Ilkka's body was taken to the Ilmajoki church, where the current Ilmajoki Museum is situated. At least 1,500 rebels were killed during the war.

== Historical criticism ==
Author and historian Heikki Ylikangas has argued that there is a bias towards depicting Jaakko Ilkka as "the great Finnish leader of the Cudgel War." Although IIkka took command of the biggest peasant horde during the end of the Cudgel War in the winter of 1596, Ylikangas contends that the heroic portrayal of him is an oversimplification of the actual history, driven by the nationalism of early Finnish historians who were targeting the Finnish-speaking population. Ilkka was not, for example, one of the original rebel leaders who sailed to Stockholm with the Finnish peasants’ letter of complaint to Duke Charles in Stockholm. He also points out that the conflict was between the poor peasant population who supported Duke Charles, and the educated upper class who benefited from King Sigismund's rule, not a conflict between Swedes and Finns. It is therefore likely that Jaakko Ilkka and his family would have been targeted by the peasant army if Ilkka had not joined the rebellion.

== Commemoration ==
A statue of Ilkka was erected at Ilmajoki in 1924.

The main newspaper of South Ostrobothnia and Coastal Ostrobothnia, Ilkka-Pohjalainen, is also named after Jaakko Ilkka.

Ilkka is said to have inspired more Finnish composers and librettists than any other figure in Finnish history. As many as three operas have been dedicated to him. One of them, the eponymous Jaakko Ilkka by Jorma Panula, was composed in 1977 and 1978, and was well-known through its performance at the Ilmajoki Music Festival in 1978, directed by the major Finnish director Edvin Laine.

A school in Ilmajoki is named after Ilkka.

The Ilkka Machine Gun Company, a volunteer unit composed of Finnish-Canadians which fought on the Republican side during the Spanish Civil War was named after Ilkka.

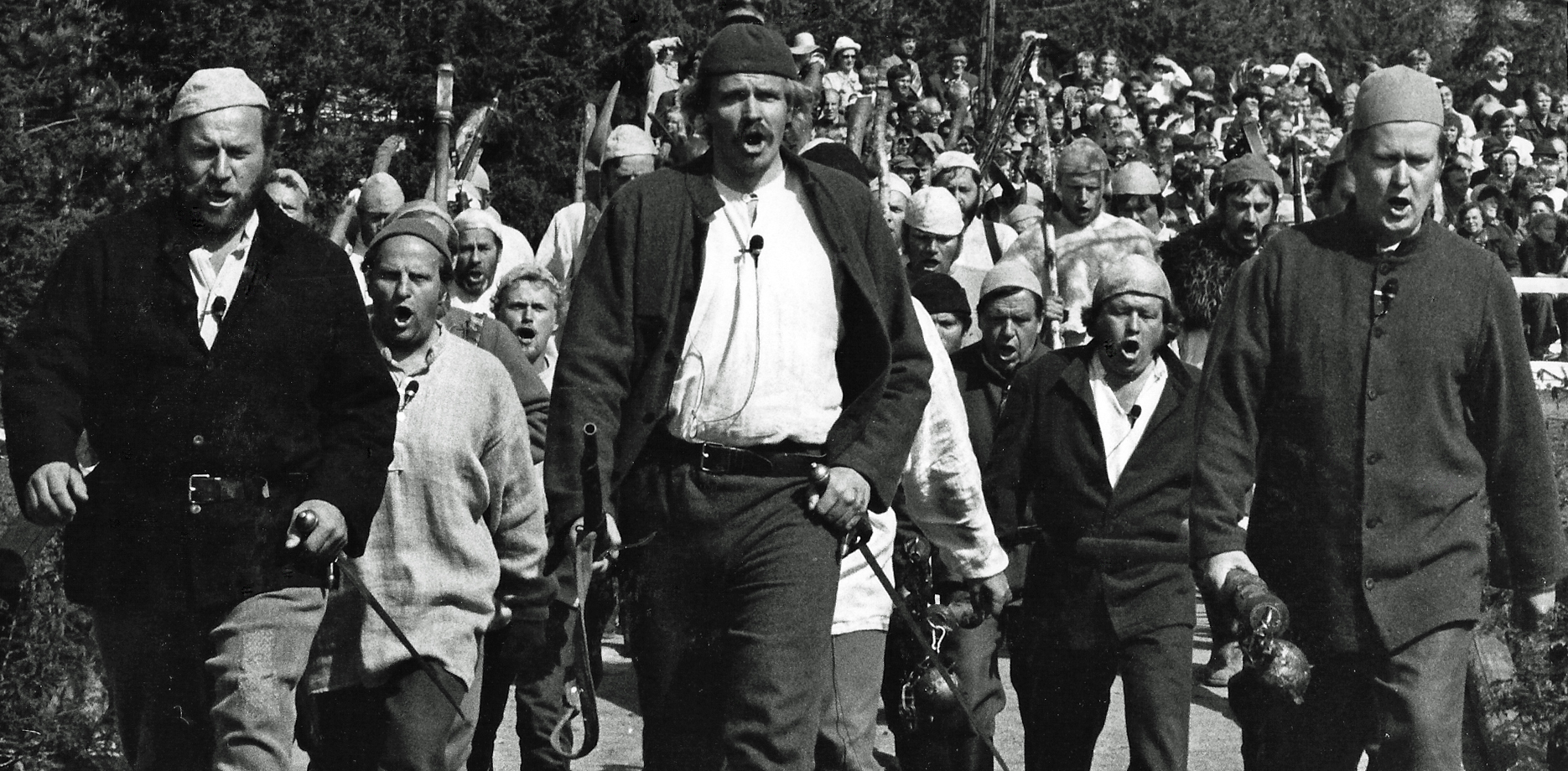
Jaakko Ilkka opera by Jorma Panula, 1978

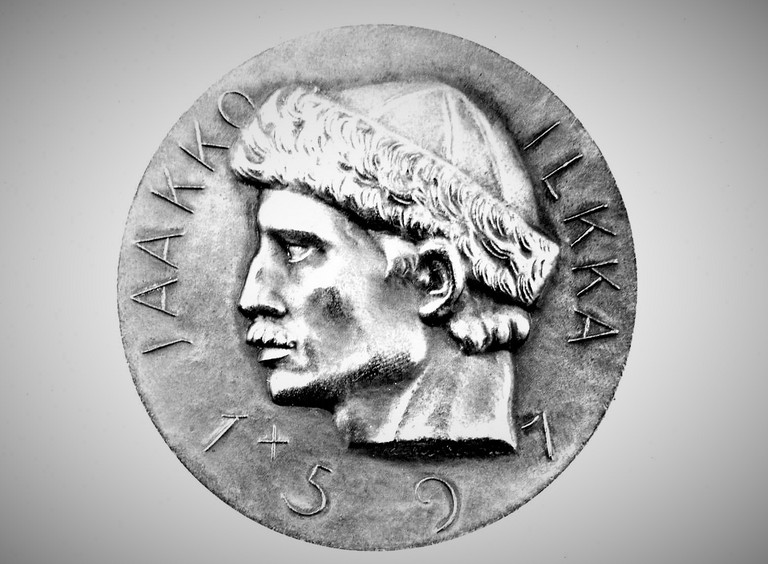
1925 bronze commemorative coin of Jaakko Ilkka, designed by Wäinö Aaltonen and minted by the French national mint

== See also ==
- Cudgel war
