= Cudgel War =

1596–1597 peasant uprising in Finland

- Part of the War against Sigismund
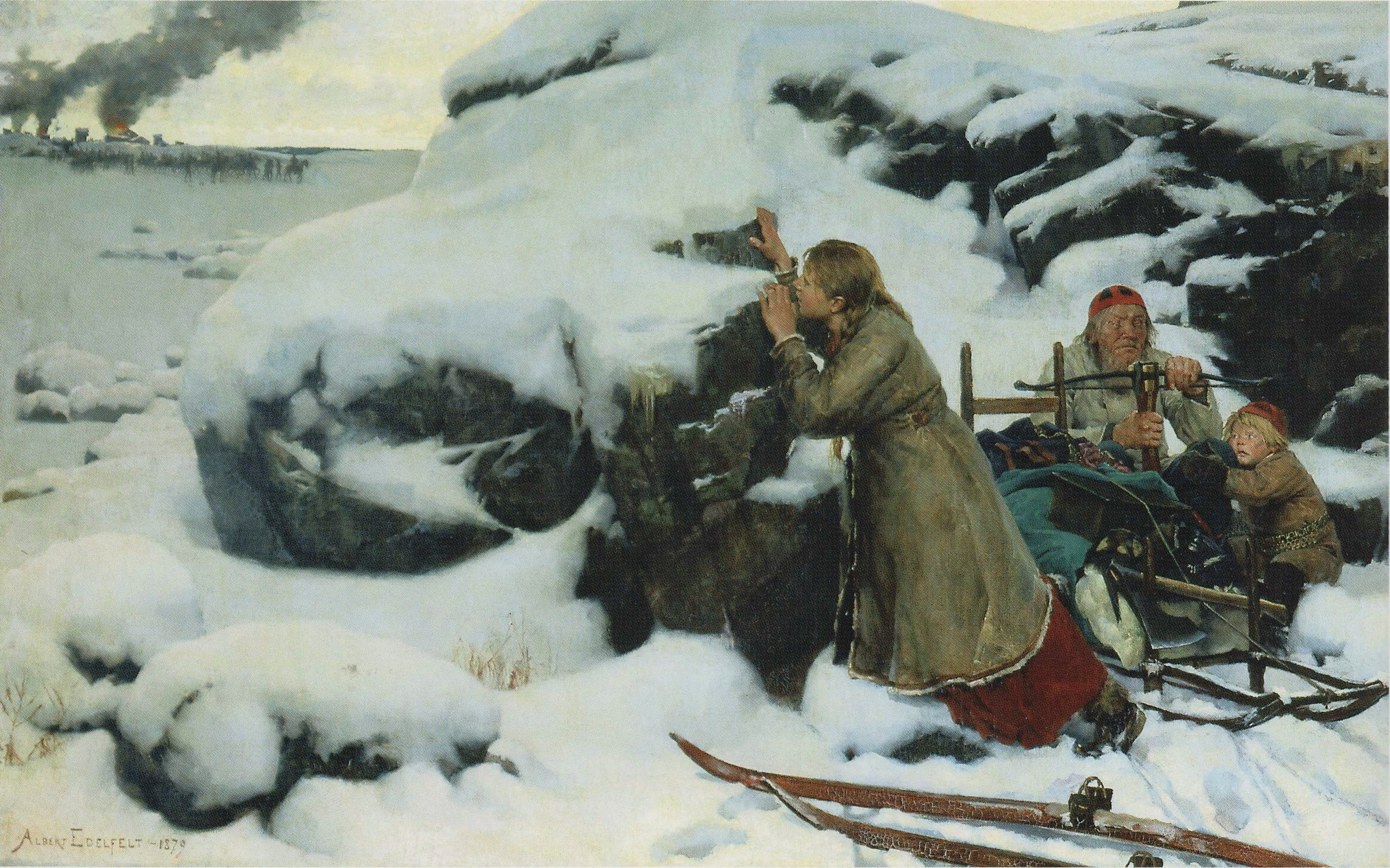
- Burned Village (1879) by Albert Edelfelt
Date	25 November 1596 – 24 February 1597
Location	Finland, Kingdom of Sweden
Result	Nobility victory

Belligerents
Finnish peasants	Nobility and army

Commanders and leaders
Jaakko Ilkka (executed); Pentti Pouttu (POW); Hannu Krankka; Yrjö Kontsas (executed); Israel Larsson; Support: Enemies of Fleming among the nobility (Sweden) Duke Charles	(Sweden) Clas Fleming (Sweden) Gödik Fincke (Sweden) Ivar Tavast (Sweden) Abraham Melkiorsson (executed) (Sweden) Axel Kurck

Strength
1,000–4,000+	1,500–3,300+

Casualties and losses
>2,550 dead >500 POW	Unknown but significant
- The strength varied in different engagements and some figures are approximations.

The Cudgel War (also known as the Club War; Finnish: Nuijasota; Swedish: Klubbekriget) was a 1596–1597 peasant uprising in Finland, which was then part of the Kingdom of Sweden. The name of the uprising derives from the fact that the peasants armed themselves with various blunt weapons, such as cudgels, flails, and maces, since they were seen as the most efficient weapons against their heavily armoured enemies. The yeomen also had swords, some firearms, and two cannons at their disposal. Their opponents, the troops of Clas Eriksson Fleming, were professional, heavily armed and armoured men-at-arms.

Modern Finnish historiography sees the uprising in the context of the conflict between Duke Charles and Sigismund, King of Sweden and Poland (War against Sigismund). Charles agitated the peasants to revolt against the nobility of Finland, which supported Sigismund during the conflict.

== Background ==
The 25-year war between the Kingdom of Sweden and the Tsardom of Russia had increased the tax burden, the most hated of which was the "castle camp", i.e. the accommodation, subsistence and payment of wages at the expense of the peasants. The peasants found it intolerable, in particular, that noble and inferior squires who equipped cavalry soldiers for the army were allowed to collect castle camp dues even when the soldiers were not at war, and that Klaus Fleming kept the army in the castle camp for many years after the war to keep it available for his use. There were many abuses and illegalities towards the peasants committed by the nobles and their armies in collecting castle camp dues. Other key explanations for the outbreak of cudgel warfare have included "the burdens of wartime and severe failed harvests, the chaos caused by war fatigue, political provocations, and the exploitation of peasants by a nobility who grew in number and wealth".

== War ==
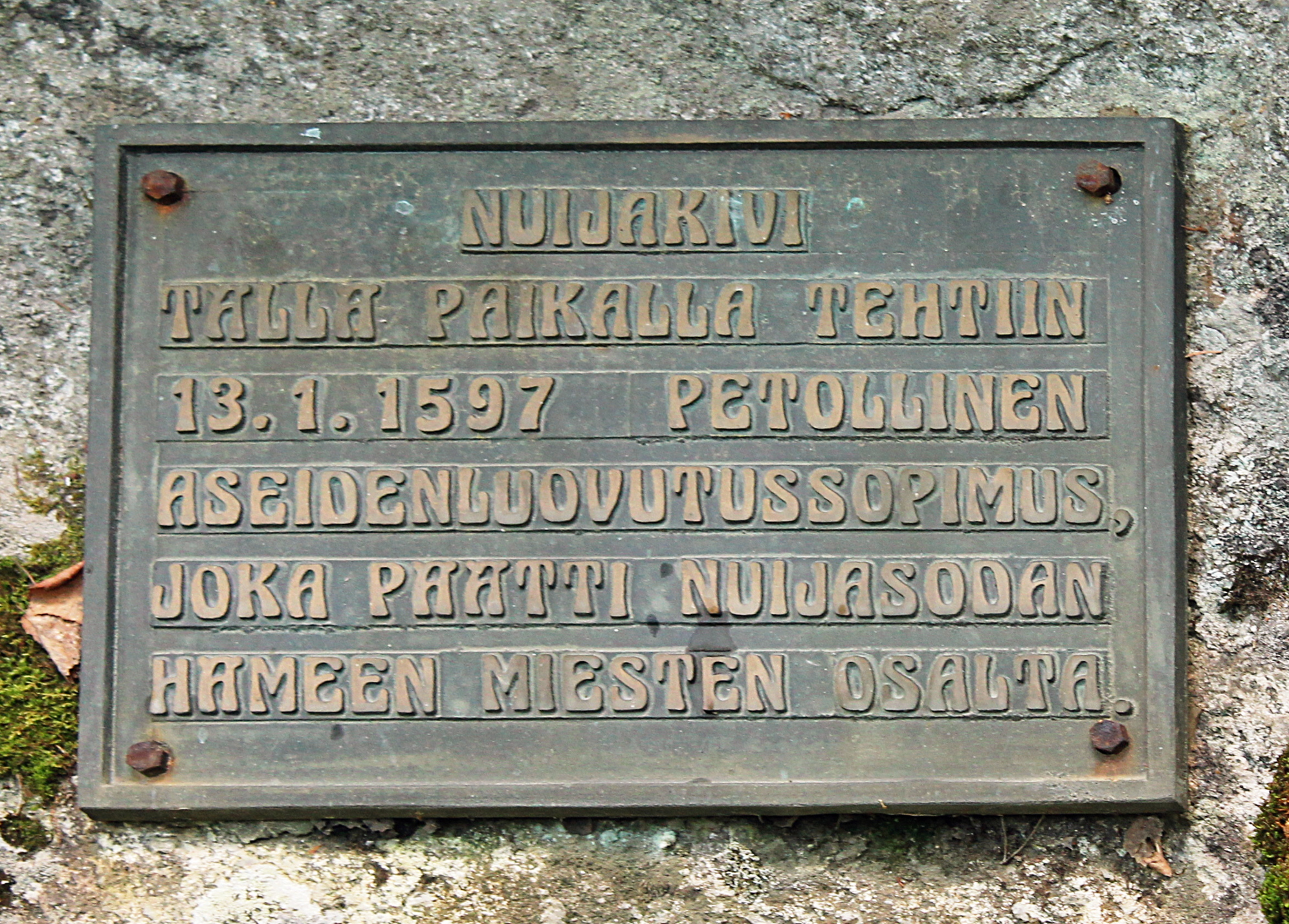
A memorial plaque dedicated to the fallen peasants

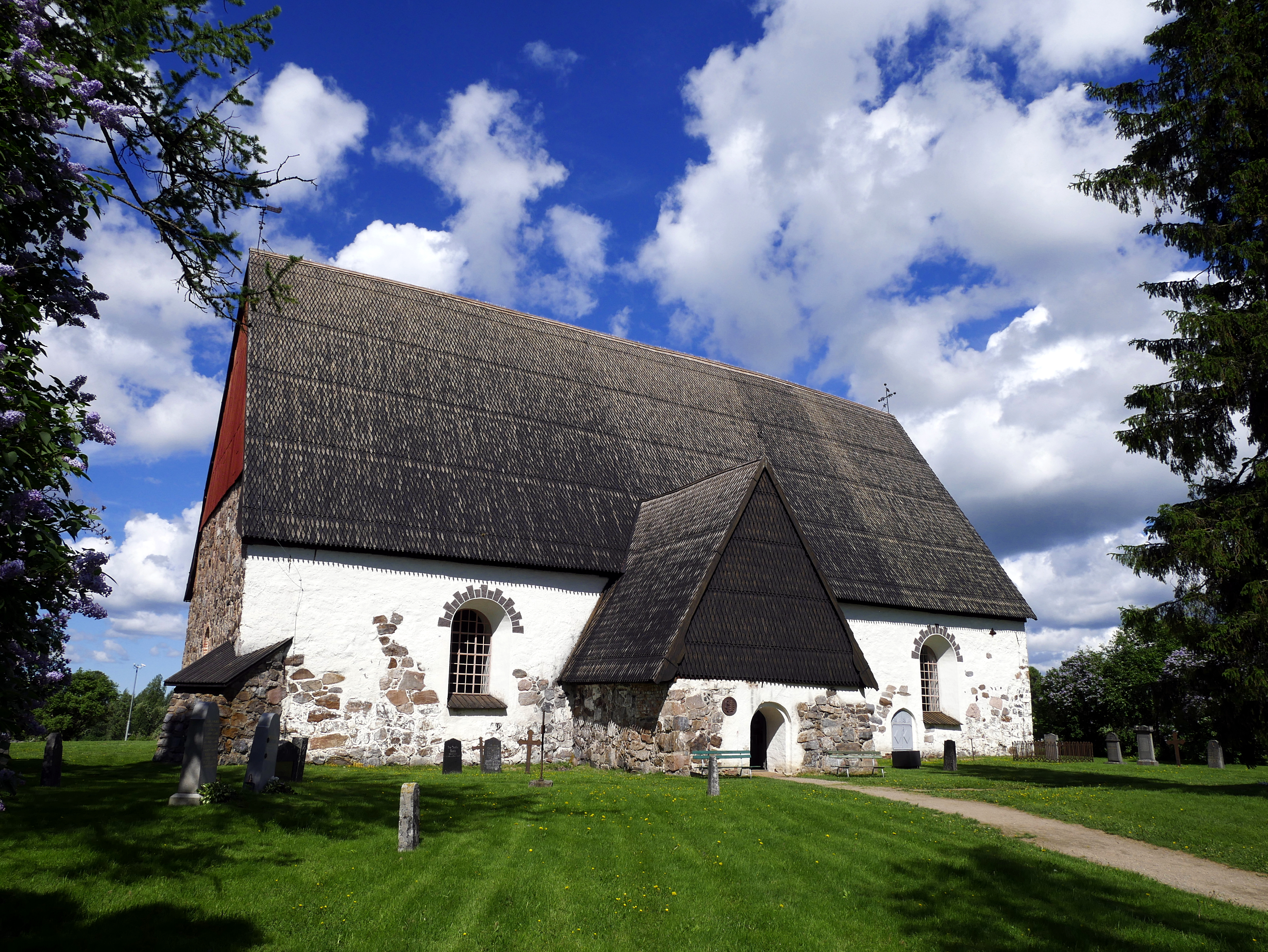
Old Isokyrö Church was the venue for the Cudgel War

An uprising began on Christmas Eve 1595 and was initially successful, but shortly thereafter was crushed by cavalry. Officially, the Cudgel War began in Ostrobothnia with an attack by peasants on Isokyrö's church on 25 November 1596. The peasants won a number of encounters with infantry. Klaus Fleming began negotiating a truce that required the surrender of peasant leader Jaakko Ilkka. Ilkka, along with his wife and some of his men, fled to avoid being handed over and the peasant army scattered, pursued by the soldiers. At least 1,500 were killed within the next two months. Along with Ilkka, five other rebellion leaders were executed on 27 January 1597.

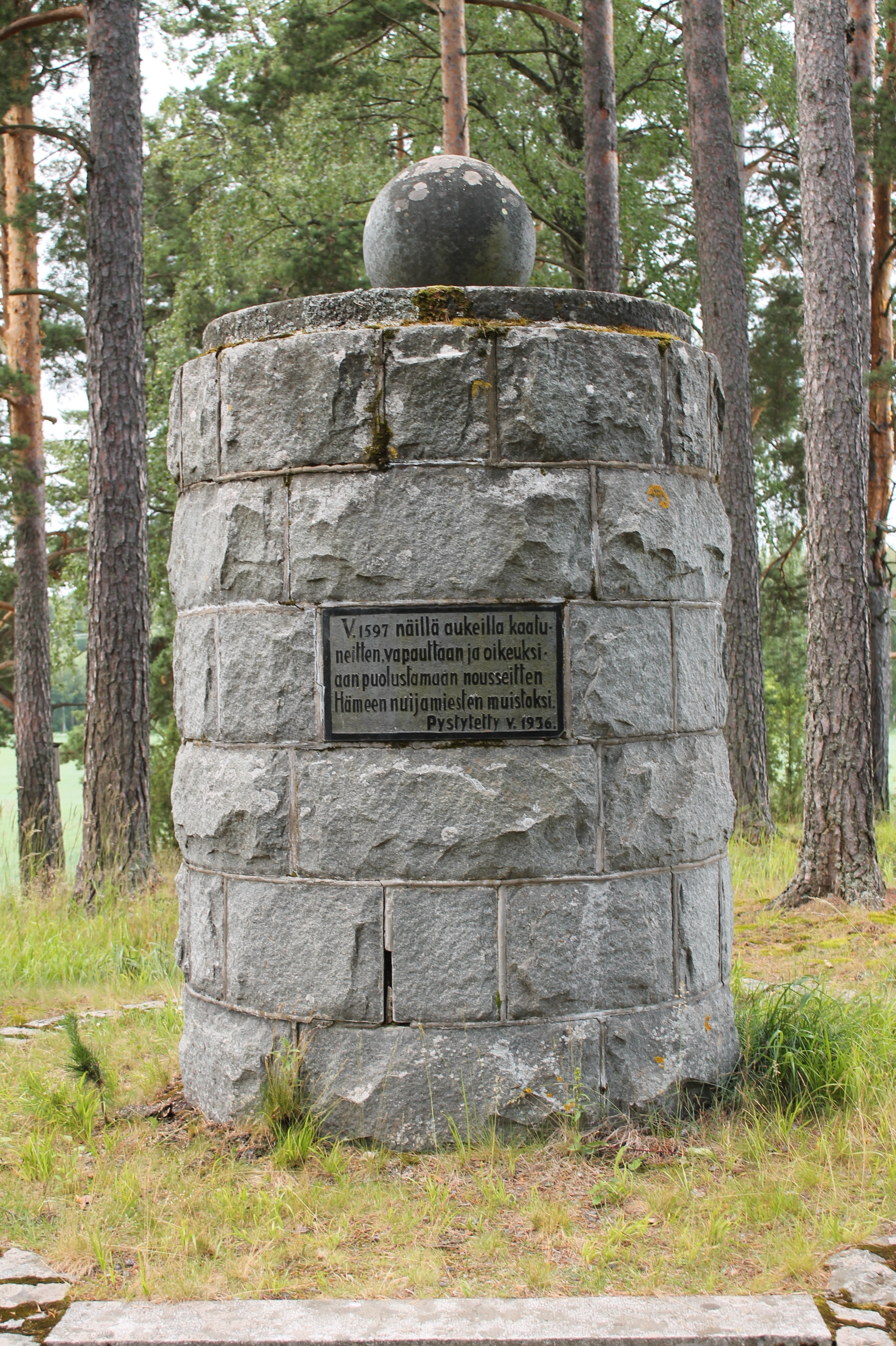
A Cudgel War memorial

Israel Larsson was named as the new governor of central and northern Ostrobothnia, and planned to support the rebellion until he fled, rather than face Fleming. Leaderless, the peasants attacked on 24 February 1597, and fought their last battle on the Santavuori Hill in Ilmajoki. Over 1,000 were killed and 500 captured.

The insurgents were mostly Finnish peasants from Ostrobothnia, Northern Tavastia, and Savo. The events can also be seen as a part of a larger power struggle between King Sigismund and Duke Charles.

== Legacy ==
In his work Nuijasota, sen syyt ja tapaukset (1857–1859) (English: Cudgel War, its reasons and causes), historian and fennoman Yrjö Koskinen (né Forsman) saw the peasants as fighting for freedom and justice. Fredrika Runeberg's Sigrid Liljeholm (1862), one of the first Finnish historical novels, depicts women's fates during the war. Albert Edelfelt's painting Burned Village (1879) depicts a woman, a child, and an old man hiding behind a rock as a village burns in the background. The poet Kaarlo Kramsu praised the insurgents and lamented their defeat in patriotic poems such as Ilkka, Hannu Krankka, and Santavuoren tappelu, published in Runoelmia (1887). After the Finnish Civil War, the debate has centered on an interpretation that emphasizes Duke Charles's role in inciting the revolt, as found in Pentti Renvall's Kuninkaanmiehiä ja kapinoitsijoita Vaasa-kauden Suomessa (1949); and an explanation that stresses the roots of the rebellion in social injustice and class conflict, as argued by Heikki Ylikangas in Nuijasota (1977). A historical reenactment of the Cudgel War is conducted yearly in the Kavalahti scout camp. Jaakko Ilkka took the 75th place in the Great Finns TV show. A commemorative silver coin was also minted to mark the occasion.

== See also ==
- War against Sigismund
- Åbo bloodbath
