= 2023–24 Turkish Women's Volleyball League =

- League: Turkish Women's Volleyball League
- Sport: Volleyball
- Teams: 14

Regular season
- Season champions: Fenerbahçe Opet

Final
- Champions: Fenerbahçe Opet
- Runners-up: Eczacıbaşı Dynavit
- Finals MVP: Melissa Vargas

Turkish Women's Volleyball League seasons
- 2022–23 2024–25

The 2023–24 Turkish Women's Volleyball League, branded as 2023-2024 Vodafone Sultans League (2023-2024 Vodafone Sultanlar Ligi in Turkish) was the 41st edition of the top-level women's volleyball tournament of the Turkish Women's Volleyball League. In a repeat of the previous season, defending champions Fenerbahçe Opet defeated Eczacıbaşı Dynavit to take their 15th title, while VakıfBank took third place ahead of Türk Hava Yolları.

== Format ==
Top 12 teams from 2022–23 Turkish Women's Volleyball League returned, with the addition of the top 2 teams from the second-tier league (2022-2023 KFC Kadınlar 1. Ligi). During the regular season, 14 teams competed in a double round-robin tournament with home-and-away fixtures. The bottom 2 teams were relegated to play in the second-tier league next season. Final rankings for the top 8 were determined with playoffs, with 5th-8th teams and the 1st-4th teams played in separate brackets. All playoff match-ups were played as best-off-three series, except for the championship series which was played best-off-five. The top three teams qualified for the 2024–25 CEV Women's Champions League, while the 4th place team qualified for the 2024–25 Women's CEV Cup, the 5th place team qualified for the 2024–25 CEV Women's Challenge Cup, and the 6th place team qualified for the 2024 Women's BVA Cup.

== Teams ==
Club	Head Coach	Captain	City	Colors
Aydın Büyükşehir Belediyespor	(Turkey) Alper Hamurcu	(Turkey) Fatma Şekerci	Aydın	
Beşiktaş Ayos	(Italy) ~~Giovanni Caprara~~ (Turkey) Recep Vatansever	(Turkey) Ecem Aknam	Istanbul	
Çukurova Belediyespor	(Turkey) ~~Mustafa Umut~~ (Turkey) Ataman Güneyligil	(Turkey) ~~Hazal Selin Arifoğlu~~ (Turkey) Nur Sevil Aydınlar	Adana	
Eczacıbaşı Dynavit	(Turkey) Ferhat Akbaş	(Serbia) Tijana Bošković (Turkey) Simge Aköz	Istanbul	
Fenerbahçe Opet	(Serbia) Stefano Lavarini	(Turkey) Eda Erdem	Istanbul	
Galatasaray Daikin	(Spain) Guillermo Hernández	(Turkey) Bihter Dumanoğlu	Istanbul	
Karayolları Spor Kulübü	(Turkey) ~~Hüseyin Doğanyüz~~ (Turkey) Barbaros Çelenk	(Turkey) Ezgi Arslan	Ankara	
Kuzeyboru	(Turkey) Mehmet Bedestenlioğlu	(Turkey) Büşra Kılıçlı	Aksaray	
Nilüfer Belediyespor	(Belgium) ~~Vital Heynen~~ (Turkey) Haluk Korkmaz	(Turkey) Eylül Akarçeşme	Bursa	
PTT	(Turkey) Tolga Ateş	(Turkey) Merve Tanyel	Ankara	
Sarıyer Belediyespor	(Turkey) Hasan Çelik	(Turkey) Merve Tanıl	Istanbul	
Muratpaşa Belediyesi SigortaShop	(Russia) ~~Inessa Korkmaz~~ (Turkey) ~~Gökhan Rahman Çokşen~~ (Turkey) Gökhan Durmaz	(Turkey) Aslıhan Kılıç	Antalya	
Türk Hava Yolları	(Brazil) Zé Roberto	(Turkey) Şeyma Ercan	Istanbul	
VakıfBank	(Italy) Giovanni Guidetti	(Brazil) Gabriela Guimarães	Istanbul	

== Venues ==
Adana	Aksaray
Adana ASKİ Atatürk Spor Salonu	Aksaray Spor Salonu
Capacity: 4.500	Capacity: 3.000
Ankara	Antalya
Başkent Voleybol Salonu	Süleyman Evcilmen Spor Salonu
Capacity: 7.600	Capacity: 2.000
Aydın	Bursa
Aydın Mimar Sinan Spor Salonu	TVF Cengiz Göllü Voleybol Salonu
Capacity: 2.000	Capacity: 4.440
İstanbul	İstanbul
TVF Burhan Felek Voleybol Salonu	Eczacıbaşı Spor Salonu
Capacity: 5.500	Capacity: 1.000
İstanbul	İstanbul
İstanbul Üniversitesi Orman Fakültesi Spor Salonu	Vakıfbank Spor Sarayı
Capacity: 750	Capacity: 2.000

== Foreign players ==
Teams are allowed to list no more than 5 foreign players in the roster for each game, and have no more than 3 foreign players on the court at a time.

Team	Player 1	Player 2	Player 3	Player 4	Player 5	Player 6
Aydın Büyükşehir Belediyespor	(Italy) Anna Nicoletti	(United States) Lauren Carlini	(Italy) Sara Loda	(Ukraine) Valeriia Nudha	—N/a	—N/a
Beşiktaş Ayos	(Russia) ~~Ekaterina Efimova~~	(Serbia) Jovana Brakočević Canzian	(Ukraine) Valeriia Nudha	(Cuba) Wilma Salas	(Netherlands) Celeste Plak	(Canada) Emily Maglio
Çukurova Belediyespor	(Peru) Ángela Leyva	(Bulgaria) Gergana Dimitrova	(Croatia) Samanta Fabris	(France) Nina Stojiljković	—N/a	—N/a
Eczacıbaşı Dynavit	(Canada) Alexa Gray	(Russia) Irina Voronkova	(Serbia) Jovana Stevanović	(Poland) Martyna Czyrniańska	(Serbia) Tijana Bošković	—N/a
Fenerbahçe Opet	(Brazil) Ana Cristina de Souza	(Russia) Arina Fedorovtseva	(Serbia) Bojana Drča	(Russia) Irina Fetisova	(Poland) Magdalena Stysiak	—N/a
Galatasaray Daikin	(United States) Danielle Cuttino	(United States) ~~Heather Gneiting~~	(Japan) Kanami Tashiro	(United States) Logan Eggleston	(Russia) ~~Polina Shemanova~~	(Serbia) Katarina Lazović
Karayolları	(Croatia) Ema Strunjak	(Spain) ~~Milagros Collar~~	(Slovenia) ~~Selena Leban~~	(Azerbaijan) Polina Rahimova	—N/a	—N/a
Kuzeyboru	(Bosnia and Herzegovina) Edina Begić	(Dominican Republic) Gaila González	(United States) Sarah Wilhite Parsons	—N/a	—N/a	—N/a
Nilüfer Belediyespor	(Switzerland) Laura Künzler	(France) Lucille Gicquel	(Bulgaria) Maria Yordanova	(Ukraine) Oleksandra Milenko	—N/a	—N/a
PTT	(Serbia) Maja Savić	(Serbia) ~~Sara Carić~~	(Serbia) Slađana Mirković	(Latvia) Marta Levinska	(China) Yiwen Miao	—N/a
Sarıyer Belediyespor	(Germany) ~~Kimberly Drewniok~~	(United States) ~~Simone Lee~~	(Russia) Yaroslava Simonenko	(Bulgaria) Merelin Nikolova	(Russia) Polina Shemanova	—N/a
Muratpaşa Belediyesi SigortaShop	(Italy) Anastasia Guerra	(Russia) ~~Marina Markova~~	(United States) Micaya White	(United States) Stephanie Samedy	—N/a	—N/a
Türk Hava Yolları	(Greece) Anthí Vasilantonáki	(Brazil) Diana Duarte	(Brazil) Júlia Bergmann	(Canada) Kiera Van Ryk	(Brazil) Macris Carneiro	—N/a
VakıfBank	(United States) Ali Frantti	(Serbia) Bianka Buša	(United States) Chiaka Ogbogu	(Brazil) Gabi Guimarães	(United States) Jordan Thompson	(Netherlands) Sarah van Aalen

== Regular season ==
=== Standings ===
Pos	Team	Pld	W	L	Pts	SW	SL	SR	SPW	SPL	SPR	Qualification or relegation
1	Fenerbahçe Opet	26	24	2	73	76	16	4.750	2224	1793	1.240	Play-off (1st-4th)
2	VakıfBank	27	25	2	72	74	21	3.524	2284	1944	1.175	Play-off (1st-4th)
3	Eczacıbaşı Dynavit	26	23	3	68	71	17	4.176	2133	1768	1.206	Play-off (1st-4th)
4	Türk Hava Yolları	26	19	7	54	62	33	1.879	2249	2001	1.124	Play-off (1st-4th)
5	Kuzeyboru	26	17	9	46	58	42	1.381	2227	2119	1.051	Play-off (5th-8th)
6	Galatasaray Daikin	26	14	12	40	50	48	1.042	2152	2084	1.033	Play-off (5th-8th)
7	Nilüfer Belediyespor	26	12	14	34	45	55	0.818	2121	2232	0.950	Play-off (5th-8th)
8	Muratpaşa Belediyesi SigortaShop	26	11	15	32	44	55	0.800	2137	2202	0.970	Play-off (5th-8th)
9	Beşiktaş Ayos	26	9	17	28	39	60	0.650	2101	2228	0.943	
10	Aydın Büyükşehir Belediyespor	26	8	18	28	43	63	0.683	2259	2378	0.950	
11	Çukurova Belediyespor	26	8	18	26	40	62	0.645	2171	2311	0.939	
12	Sarıyer Belediyespor	26	6	20	21	33	64	0.516	1939	2194	0.884	
13	PTT	26	6	20	20	29	67	0.433	1949	2215	0.880	Relegation
14	Karayolları	26	1	25	7	15	76	0.197	1718	2195	0.783	Relegation

Source: TVF
Rules for classification: 1) Games won 2) Points 3) Set ratio 4) Setpoint ratio

=== Fixture and Results ===
==== First Half (Weeks 1-13) ====
Date	Time		Score		Set 1	Set 2	Set 3	Set 4	Set 5	Total	Report
Week 1
14 Oct 2023	13:00	PTT	1–3	Kuzeyboru	14–25	18–25	25–19	25–27		82–96	Report
14 Oct 2023	14:00	Çukurova Belediyespor	0–3	Muratpaşa Belediyesi SigortaShop	22–25	22–25	23–25			67–75	Report
14 Oct 2023	14:00	VakıfBank	3–0	Karayolları	26–24	25–19	25–18			76–61	Report
14 Oct 2023	15:30	Fenerbahçe Opet	3–0	Aydın Büyükşehir Belediyespor	25–15	29–27	25–19			79–61	Report
14 Oct 2023	17:30	Sarıyer Belediyespor	2–3	Beşiktaş Ayos	15–25	21–25	25–13	25–21	13–15	99–99	Report
14 Oct 2023	18:30	Türk Hava Yolları	0–3	Eczacıbaşı Dynavit	18–25	21–25	22–25			61–75	Report
15 Oct 2023	15:00	Nilüfer Belediyespor	3–2	Galatasaray Daikin	25–20	22–25	25–20	18–25	15–13	105–103	Report
Week 2
17 Oct 2023	15:00	Beşiktaş Ayos	2–3	VakıfBank	17–25	20–25	25–20	26–24	9–15	97–109	Report
17 Oct 2023	17:00	Karayolları	0–3	PTT	24–26	19–25	15–25			58–76	Report
17 Oct 2023	18:00	Kuzeyboru	3–1	Türk Hava Yolları	25–21	24–26	25–21	25–14		99–82	Report
17 Oct 2023	18:30	Eczacıbaşı Dynavit	3–2	Fenerbahçe Opet	23–25	25–23	25–23	18–25	15–11	106–107	Report
17 Oct 2023	19:00	Aydın Büyükşehir Belediyespor	1–3	Çukurova Belediyespor	18–25	18–24	25–22	20–25		81–96	Report
18 Oct 2023	18:00	Muratpaşa Belediyesi SigortaShop	3–2	Nilüfer Belediyespor	25–21	23–25	25–19	18–25	17–15	108–105	Report
24 Oct 2023	17:00	Galatasaray Daikin	3–2	Sarıyer Belediyespor	27–29	25–16	22–25	25–22	15–12	114–104	Report
Week 3
21 Oct 2023	14:00	Çukurova Belediyespor	2–3	Nilüfer Belediyespor	25–21	23–25	16–25	25–16	11–15	100–102	Report
21 Oct 2023	14:00	VakıfBank	3–0	Galatasaray Daikin	25–12	25–15	25–16			75–43	Report
21 Oct 2023	15:00	Aydın Büyükşehir Belediyespor	2–3	Eczacıbaşı Dynavit	25–18	25–23	12–25	18–25	13–15	93–106	Report
21 Oct 2023	15:00	Türk Hava Yolları	3–0	Karayolları	25–11	25–22	25–16			75–49	Report
21 Oct 2023	15:00	PTT	3–1	Beşiktaş Ayos	25–19	25–13	18–25	25–17		93–74	Report
21 Oct 2023	17:00	Sarıyer Belediyespor	3–1	Muratpaşa Belediyesi SigortaShop	20–25	25–15	25–14	25–16		95–70	Report
21 Oct 2023	17:00	Fenerbahçe Opet	3–0	Kuzeyboru	25–23	25–9	25–22			75–54	Report
Week 4
28 Oct 2023	14:00	Galatasaray Daikin	3–0	PTT	25–23	25–16	25–20			75–59	Report
28 Oct 2023	15:00	Nilüfer Belediyespor	3–1	Sarıyer Belediyespor	25–23	25–21	16–25	25–18		91–87	Report
28 Oct 2023	16:00	Karayolları	0–3	Fenerbahçe Opet	7–25	19–25	16–25			42–75	Report
28 Oct 2023	17:00	Beşiktaş Ayos	0–3	Türk Hava Yolları	19–25	20–25	20–25			59–75	Report
28 Oct 2023	18:00	Kuzeyboru	3–2	Aydın Büyükşehir Belediyespor	26–28	21–25	25–16	25–20	17–15	114–104	Report
28 Oct 2023	18:00	Muratpaşa Belediyesi SigortaShop	1–3	VakıfBank	24–26	22–25	25–22	20–25		91–98	Report
28 Oct 2023	19:00	Eczacıbaşı Dynavit	3–0	Çukurova Belediyespor	25–20	25–17	25–12			75–49	Report
Week 5
31 Oct 2023	14:00	VakıfBank	3–1	Nilüfer Belediyespor	25–16	22–25	25–16	25–19		97–76	Report
31 Oct 2023	14:00	PTT	0–3	Muratpaşa Belediyesi SigortaShop	18–25	23–25	18–25			59–75	Report
31 Oct 2023	15:30	Türk Hava Yolları	3–1	Galatasaray Daikin	25–18	23–25	25–23	25–15		98–81	Report
31 Oct 2023	17:30	Çukurova Belediyespor	2–3	Sarıyer Belediyespor	15–25	17–25	25–21	25–10	12–15	94–96	Report
31 Oct 2023	18:30	Eczacıbaşı Dynavit	3–0	Kuzeyboru	25–22	25–18	25–20			75–60	Report
31 Oct 2023	19:00	Aydın Büyükşehir Belediyespor	3–0	Karayolları	25–14	25–15	26–24			76–53	Report
31 Oct 2023	19:00	Fenerbahçe Opet	3–0	Beşiktaş Ayos	25–22	26–24	25–10			76–56	Report
Week 6
4 Nov 2023	13:00	Karayolları	0–3	Eczacıbaşı Dynavit	19–25	24–26	18–25			61–76	Report
4 Nov 2023	13:00	Galatasaray Daikin	1–3	Fenerbahçe Opet	24–26	25–19	19–25	22–25		90–95	Report
4 Nov 2023	15:00	Nilüfer Belediyespor	3–2	PTT	25–22	25–18	18–25	24–26	15–7	107–98	Report
4 Nov 2023	15:00	Sarıyer Belediyespor	0–3	VakıfBank	14–25	21–25	18–25			53–75	Report
4 Nov 2023	18:00	Kuzeyboru	3–0	Çukurova Belediyespor	27–25	25–22	25–15			77–62	Report
4 Nov 2023	18:00	Beşiktaş Ayos	3–0	Aydın Büyükşehir Belediyespor	25–16	25–23	26–24			76–63	Report
4 Nov 2023	18:00	Muratpaşa Belediyesi SigortaShop	3–1	Türk Hava Yolları	25–15	25–17	27–29	26–24		103–85	Report
Week 7
10 Nov 2023	14:00	PTT	0–3	Sarıyer Belediyespor	15–25	22–25	20–25			57–75	Report
11 Nov 2023	14:00	Çukurova Belediyespor	0–3	VakıfBank	19–25	20–25	21–25			60–75	Report
11 Nov 2023	14:00	Fenerbahçe Opet	3–1	Muratpaşa Belediyesi SigortaShop	22–25	25–23	25–13	25–16		97–77	Report
11 Nov 2023	18:00	Kuzeyboru	3–0	Karayolları	25–20	26–24	25–18			76–62	Report
11 Nov 2023	18:00	Türk Hava Yolları	3–1	Nilüfer Belediyespor	25–23	29–31	25–17	25–14		104–85	Report
11 Nov 2023	18:30	Eczacıbaşı Dynavit	3–0	Beşiktaş Ayos	25–18	25–21	25–19			75–58	Report
12 Nov 2023	15:00	Aydın Büyükşehir Belediyespor	3–2	Galatasaray Daikin	25–23	18–25	25–16	23–25	16–14	107–103	Report
Week 8
17 Nov 2023	14:00	VakıfBank	3–0	PTT	25–16	25–15	25–21			75–52	Report
18 Nov 2023	13:00	Karayolları	2–3	Çukurova Belediyespor	25–21	25–21	22–25	22–25	11–15	105–107	Report
18 Nov 2023	15:00	Nilüfer Belediyespor	1–3	Fenerbahçe Opet	17–25	18–25	25–20	22–25		82–95	Report
18 Nov 2023	15:00	Beşiktaş Ayos	2–3	Kuzeyboru	18–25	25–18	22–25	25–19	11–15	101–102	Report
18 Nov 2023	17:00	Sarıyer Belediyespor	0–3	Türk Hava Yolları	12–25	24–26	18–25			54–76	Report
18 Nov 2023	18:00	Muratpaşa Belediyesi SigortaShop	2–3	Aydın Büyükşehir Belediyespor	21–25	25–13	22–25	25–15	11–15	104–93	Report
19 Nov 2023	18:00	Galatasaray Daikin	0–3	Eczacıbaşı Dynavit	16–25	12–25	18–25			46–75	Report
Week 9
21 Nov 2023	15:00	Karayolları	1–3	Beşiktaş Ayos	19–25	26–24	14–25	16–25		75–99	Report
21 Nov 2023	15:00	Fenerbahçe Opet	3–0	Sarıyer Belediyespor	25–14	25–14	25–14			75–42	Report
21 Nov 2023	17:30	Çukurova Belediyespor	1–3	PTT	25–16	20–25	22–25	21–25		88–91	Report
21 Nov 2023	18:00	Türk Hava Yolları	1–3	VakıfBank	23–25	25–27	25–17	23–25		96–94	Report
21 Nov 2023	19:00	Aydın Büyükşehir Belediyespor	3–1	Nilüfer Belediyespor	25–22	18–25	25–19	25–23		93–89	Report
22 Nov 2023	18:00	Kuzeyboru	3–0	Galatasaray Daikin	25–23	25–20	25–16			75–59	Report
22 Nov 2023	18:00	Eczacıbaşı Dynavit	3–0	Muratpaşa Belediyesi SigortaShop	25–10	25–18	25–15			75–43	Report
Week 10
24 Nov 2023	19:00	VakıfBank	1–3	Fenerbahçe Opet	24–26	20–25	25–21	20–25		89–97	Report
25 Nov 2023	13:00	Beşiktaş Ayos	0–3	Çukurova Belediyespor	28–30	24–26	24–26			76–82	Report
25 Nov 2023	14:00	PTT	0–3	Türk Hava Yolları	23–25	17–25	19–25			59–75	Report
25 Nov 2023	15:00	Nilüfer Belediyespor	0–3	Eczacıbaşı Dynavit	9–25	21–25	18–25			48–75	Report
25 Nov 2023	16:00	Galatasaray Daikin	3–1	Karayolları	23–25	25–13	25–22	25–15		98–75	Report
25 Nov 2023	17:30	Sarıyer Belediyespor	3–0	Aydın Büyükşehir Belediyespor	25–22	25–19	25–16			75–57	Report
26 Nov 2023	18:00	Muratpaşa Belediyesi SigortaShop	3–2	Kuzeyboru	12–25	27–25	12–25	25–18	16–14	92–107	Report
Week 11
1 Dec 2023	14:00	Karayolları	0–3	Muratpaşa Belediyesi SigortaShop	22–25	22–25	17–25			61–75	Report
2 Dec 2023	13:00	Fenerbahçe Opet	3–0	PTT	26–24	25–12	25–17			76–53	Report
2 Dec 2023	14:00	Çukurova Belediyespor	2–3	Türk Hava Yolları	25–20	25–23	16–25	20–25	11–15	97–108	Report
2 Dec 2023	15:00	Aydın Büyükşehir Belediyespor	2–3	VakıfBank	12–25	25–20	20–25	25–19	10–15	92–104	Report
2 Dec 2023	18:00	Kuzeyboru	3–0	Nilüfer Belediyespor	25–19	25–13	25–15			75–47	Report
2 Dec 2023	18:30	Eczacıbaşı Dynavit	3–1	Sarıyer Belediyespor	23–25	25–21	25–23	25–23		98–92	Report
3 Dec 2023	19:00	Beşiktaş Ayos	1–3	Galatasaray Daikin	25–16	22–25	19–25	12–25		78–91	Report
Week 12
25 Oct 2023	19:00	VakıfBank	3–0	Eczacıbaşı Dynavit	25–23	25–22	25–20			75–65	Report
8 Dec 2023	19:00	PTT	3–2	Aydın Büyükşehir Belediyespor	17–25	25–20	25–23	22–25	15–11	104–104	Report
9 Dec 2023	14:30	Türk Hava Yolları	1–3	Fenerbahçe Opet	16–25	21–25	25–22	20–25		82–97	Report
9 Dec 2023	15:00	Nilüfer Belediyespor	3–0	Karayolları	25–16	25–13	25–18			75–47	Report
9 Dec 2023	17:00	Sarıyer Belediyespor	2–3	Kuzeyboru	25–20	16–25	20–25	26–24	13–15	100–109	Report
9 Dec 2023	17:00	Galatasaray Daikin	3–2	Çukurova Belediyespor	23–25	19–25	25–18	25–17	15–8	107–93	Report
9 Dec 2023	18:00	Muratpaşa Belediyesi SigortaShop	2–3	Beşiktaş Ayos	18–25	25–19	23–25	25–19	12–15	103–103	Report
Week 13
16 Dec 2023	14:00	Çukurova Belediyespor	0–3	Fenerbahçe Opet	19–25	19–25	17–25			55–75	Report
16 Dec 2023	14:00	Galatasaray Daikin	3–2	Muratpaşa Belediyesi SigortaShop	25–21	26–24	23–25	25–27	15–11	114–108	Report
16 Dec 2023	15:00	Aydın Büyükşehir Belediyespor	1–3	Türk Hava Yolları	25–23	20–25	17–25	21–25		83–98	Report
16 Dec 2023	17:00	Karayolları	3–1	Sarıyer Belediyespor	25–21	17–25	25–23	25–22		92–91	Report
16 Dec 2023	18:00	Beşiktaş Ayos	1–3	Nilüfer Belediyespor	23–25	25–18	21–25	22–25		91–93	Report
22 Dec 2023	14:00	Eczacıbaşı Dynavit	3–0	PTT	25–17	25–16	25–12			75–45	Report
22 Dec 2023	19:00	Kuzeyboru	1–3	VakıfBank	22–25	20–25	26–24	19–25		87–99	Report

==== Second Half (Weeks 14-26) ====
Date	Time		Score		Set 1	Set 2	Set 3	Set 4	Set 5	Total	Report
Week 14
5 Jan 2024	14:00	Karayolları	0–3	VakıfBank	12–25	14–25	18–25			44–75	Report
6 Jan 2024	18:30	Eczacıbaşı Dynavit	3–0	Türk Hava Yolları	27–25	25–17	25–23			77–65	Report
7 Jan 2024	13:00	Beşiktaş Ayos	3–1	Sarıyer Belediyespor	25–19	25–20	22–25	25–22		97–86	Report
7 Jan 2024	15:00	Aydın Büyükşehir Belediyespor	0–3	Fenerbahçe Opet	22–25	23–25	17–25			62–75	Report
7 Jan 2024	16:00	Galatasaray Daikin	3–0	Nilüfer Belediyespor	25–22	25–9	25–19			75–50	Report
7 Jan 2024	18:00	Kuzeyboru	3–2	PTT	21–25	25–23	13–25	25–23	15–7	99–103	Report
7 Jan 2024	18:00	Muratpaşa Belediyesi SigortaShop	3–1	Çukurova Belediyespor	25–21	23–25	25–20	25–18		98–84	Report
Week 15
13 Jan 2024	14:00	VakıfBank	3–1	Beşiktaş Ayos	25–19	26–24	28–30	25–19		104–92	Report
14 Jan 2024	14:00	Çukurova Belediyespor	3–1	Aydın Büyükşehir Belediyespor	23–25	25–22	25–22	25–23		98–92	Report
14 Jan 2024	15:00	Nilüfer Belediyespor	3–0	Muratpaşa Belediyesi SigortaShop	25–23	25–15	27–25			77–63	Report
14 Jan 2024	16:00	Türk Hava Yolları	3–1	Kuzeyboru	25–20	25–27	25–20	28–26		103–93	Report
14 Jan 2024	17:00	Sarıyer Belediyespor	0–3	Galatasaray Daikin	15–25	17–25	11–25			43–75	Report
14 Jan 2024	18:00	PTT	3–2	Karayolları	25–20	18–25	25–15	23–25	15–12	106–97	Report
28 Mar 2024	19:30	Fenerbahçe Opet	3–2	Eczacıbaşı Dynavit	19–25	25–22	25–21	19–25	15–10	103–103	Report
Week 16
20 Jan 2024	14:00	Eczacıbaşı Dynavit	3–1	Aydın Büyükşehir Belediyespor	26–28	25–23	25–22	26–24		102–97	Report
21 Jan 2024	14:00	Beşiktaş Ayos	3–2	PTT	20–25	25–21	20–25	26–24	15–3	106–98	Report
21 Jan 2024	15:00	Nilüfer Belediyespor	0–3	Çukurova Belediyespor	27–29	23–25	22–25			72–79	Report
21 Jan 2024	15:30	Kuzeyboru	1–3	Fenerbahçe Opet	19–25	31–33	25–22	15–25		90–105	Report
21 Jan 2024	16:00	Karayolları	0–3	Türk Hava Yolları	14–25	23–25	20–25			57–75	Report
21 Jan 2024	17:00	Galatasaray Daikin	0–3	VakıfBank	16–25	20–25	22–25			58–75	Report
21 Jan 2024	18:00	Muratpaşa Belediyesi SigortaShop	3–0	Sarıyer Belediyespor	25–15	25–15	25–14			75–44	Report
Week 17
24 Jan 2024	14:00	VakıfBank	3–0	Muratpaşa Belediyesi SigortaShop	25–25	25–20	26–24			76–69	Report
24 Jan 2024	15:00	Fenerbahçe Opet	3–0	Karayolları	25–20	25–22	25–18			75–60	Report
24 Jan 2024	15:30	Çukurova Belediyespor	1–3	Eczacıbaşı Dynavit	20–25	25–20	14–25	24–26		83–96	Report
24 Jan 2024	17:00	PTT	0–3	Galatasaray Daikin	14–25	18–25	29–31			61–81	Report
24 Jan 2024	17:00	Sarıyer Belediyespor	1–3	Nilüfer Belediyespor	11–25	17–25	25–13	21–25		74–88	Report
24 Jan 2024	18:00	Türk Hava Yolları	3–0	Beşiktaş Ayos	25–14	25–14	25–23			75–51	Report
24 Jan 2024	19:00	Aydın Büyükşehir Belediyespor	3–1	Kuzeyboru	25–17	17–25	25–23	25–23		92–88	Report
Week 18
28 Jan 2024	14:00	Beşiktaş Ayos	0–3	Fenerbahçe Opet	24–26	21–25	16–25			61–76	Report
28 Jan 2024	17:00	Galatasaray Daikin	0–3	Türk Hava Yolları	21–25	17–25	16–25			54–75	Report
28 Jan 2024	17:00	Sarıyer Belediyespor	2–3	Çukurova Belediyespor	25–20	17–25	26–28	25–22	11–15	104–110	Report
28 Jan 2024	18:00	Muratpaşa Belediyesi SigortaShop	3–0	PTT	25–18	25–15	25–18			75–51	Report
28 Jan 2024	18:00	Kuzeyboru	0–3	Eczacıbaşı Dynavit	20–25	26–28	16–25			62–78	Report
29 Jan 2024	15:00	Karayolları	2–3	Aydın Büyükşehir Belediyespor	25–21	23–25	21–25	25–23	13–15	107–109	Report
28 Mar 2024	17:00	Nilüfer Belediyespor	2–3	VakıfBank	17–25	25–21	31–29	14–25	5–15	92–115	Report
Week 19
4 Feb 2024	14:00	Çukurova Belediyespor	2–3	Kuzeyboru	25–20	22–25	25–11	24–26	15–17	111–99	Report
4 Feb 2024	14:00	PTT	1–3	Nilüfer Belediyespor	19–25	23–25	28–26	20–25		90–101	Report
4 Feb 2024	14:00	Türk Hava Yolları	3–0	Muratpaşa Belediyesi SigortaShop	25–25	25–17	25–20			75–62	Report
4 Feb 2024	14:00	Eczacıbaşı Dynavit	3–0	Karayolları	25–22	25–11	25–17			75–50	Report
4 Feb 2024	15:00	Aydın Büyükşehir Belediyespor	0–3	Beşiktaş Ayos	26–28	23–25	17–25			66–78	Report
4 Feb 2024	15:30	VakıfBank	3–0	Sarıyer Belediyespor	25–19	25–18	25–15			75–52	Report
4 Feb 2024	17:30	Fenerbahçe Opet	3–0	Galatasaray Daikin	25–20	25–18	25–20			75–58	Report
Week 20
11 Feb 2024	13:00	Galatasaray Daikin	3–2	Aydın Büyükşehir Belediyespor	25–18	22–25	25–22	20–25	16–14	108–104	Report
11 Feb 2024	14:00	Muratpaşa Belediyesi SigortaShop	0–3	Fenerbahçe Opet	17–25	20–25	19–25			56–75	Report
11 Feb 2024	14:00	VakıfBank	3–1	Çukurova Belediyespor	25–19	23–25	25–23	25–17		98–84	Report
11 Feb 2024	15:00	Karayolları	0–3	Kuzeyboru	13–25	12–25	16–25			41–75	Report
11 Feb 2024	15:00	Nilüfer Belediyespor	1–3	Türk Hava Yolları	25–20	17–25	22–25	23–25		87–95	Report
11 Feb 2024	16:30	Beşiktaş Ayos	0–3	Eczacıbaşı Dynavit	23–25	17–25	8–25			48–75	Report
11 Feb 2024	17:00	Sarıyer Belediyespor	3–0	PTT	25–22	25–23	25–23			75–68	Report
Week 21
16 Feb 2024	17:00	PTT	0–3	VakıfBank	25–27	17–27	18–25			60–79	Report
17 Feb 2024	18:00	Fenerbahçe Opet	3–0	Nilüfer Belediyespor	25–23	25–15	25–17			75–55	Report
17 Feb 2024	18:30	Eczacıbaşı Dynavit	3–0	Galatasaray Daikin	25–21	28–26	25–21			78–68	Report
18 Feb 2024	13:00	Türk Hava Yolları	3–1	Sarıyer Belediyespor	25–8	21–25	25–13	25–13		96–59	Report
18 Feb 2024	14:00	Çukurova Belediyespor	3–0	Karayolları	25–19	25–18	25–18			75–55	Report
18 Feb 2024	14:00	Kuzeyboru	3–0	Beşiktaş Ayos	25–18	25–19	25–21			75–58	Report
18 Feb 2024	15:00	Aydın Büyükşehir Belediyespor	2–3	Muratpaşa Belediyesi SigortaShop	19–25	25–16	22–25	25–21	14–16	105–103	Report
Week 22
24 Feb 2024	14:00	VakıfBank	3–1	Türk Hava Yolları	17–25	25–21	25–22	27–25		94–93	Report
25 Feb 2024	13:30	Galatasaray Daikin	2–3	Kuzeyboru	23–25	18–25	25–15	25–20	9–15	100–100	Report
25 Feb 2024	14:00	Muratpaşa Belediyesi SigortaShop	0–3	Eczacıbaşı Dynavit	22–25	22–25	31–33			75–83	Report
25 Feb 2024	15:00	Nilüfer Belediyespor	3–2	Aydın Büyükşehir Belediyespor	23–25	18–25	25–11	25–21	18–16	109–98	Report
25 Feb 2024	17:00	Sarıyer Belediyespor	0–3	Fenerbahçe Opet	15–25	10–25	15–25			40–75	Report
25 Feb 2024	18:30	Beşiktaş Ayos	3–0	Karayolları	25–17	25–18	25–9			75–44	Report
26 Feb 2024	15:00	PTT	3–1	Çukurova Belediyespor	23–25	25–23	25–19	25–21		98–88	Report
Week 23
2 Mar 2024	14:00	Çukurova Belediyespor	3–2	Beşiktaş Ayos	25–21	22–25	22–25	25–21	15–11	109–103	Report
3 Mar 2024	14:00	Kuzeyboru	3–1	Muratpaşa Belediyesi SigortaShop	26–24	25–18	17–25	25–15		93–82	Report
3 Mar 2024	14:00	Karayolları	0–3	Galatasaray Daikin	19–25	26–28	20–25			65–78	Report
3 Mar 2024	15:00	Aydın Büyükşehir Belediyespor	3–1	Sarıyer Belediyespor	23–25	25–19	25–14	25–21		98–79	Report
3 Mar 2024	15:00	Türk Hava Yolları	3–2	PTT	27–29	25–16	23–25	25–10	15–12	115–92	Report
3 Mar 2024	18:30	Eczacıbaşı Dynavit	3–0	Nilüfer Belediyespor	25–17	25–14	28–26			78–57	Report
3 Mar 2024	19:00	Fenerbahçe Opet	3–1	VakıfBank	25–23	22–25	25–18	25–21		97–87	Report
Week 24
6 Mar 2024	14:00	Türk Hava Yolları	3–0	Çukurova Belediyespor	28–26	25–23	30–28			83–77	Report
6 Mar 2024	17:00	Muratpaşa Belediyesi SigortaShop	3–2	Karayolları	25–22	22–25	25–17	22–25	15–7	109–96	Report
6 Mar 2024	17:00	Nilüfer Belediyespor	0–3	Kuzeyboru	16–25	23–25	18–25			57–75	Report
6 Mar 2024	17:00	Sarıyer Belediyespor	0–3	Eczacıbaşı Dynavit	25–27	18–25	23–25			66–77	Report
6 Mar 2024	17:00	VakıfBank	3–1	Aydın Büyükşehir Belediyespor	30–28	25–23	23–25	25–23		103–99	Report
6 Mar 2024	17:30	PTT	0–3	Fenerbahçe Opet	21–25	24–26	18–25			63–76	Report
6 Mar 2024	18:00	Galatasaray Daikin	3–2	Beşiktaş Ayos	24–26	30–32	25–20	25–17	15–13	119–108	Report
Week 25
9 Mar 2024	18:30	Fenerbahçe Opet	2–3	Türk Hava Yolları	23–25	19–25	25–21	25–18	11–15	103–104	Report
10 Mar 2024	14:00	Çukurova Belediyespor	0–3	Galatasaray Daikin	15–25	19–25	13–25			47–75	Report
10 Mar 2024	14:00	Kuzeyboru	3–0	Sarıyer Belediyespor	26–24	25–13	25–15			76–52	Report
10 Mar 2024	15:00	Karayolları	1–3	Nilüfer Belediyespor	17–25	25–19	25–27	17–25		84–96	Report
10 Mar 2024	15:00	Aydın Büyükşehir Belediyespor	3–0	PTT	25–16	25–17	25–17			75–50	Report
10 Mar 2024	18:00	Beşiktaş Ayos	3–1	Muratpaşa Belediyesi SigortaShop	25–20	28–26	21–25	25–19		99–90	Report
10 Mar 2024	19:30	Eczacıbaşı Dynavit	0–3	VakıfBank	18–25	22–25	23–25			63–75	Report
Week 26
16 Mar 2024	17:00	Fenerbahçe Opet	3–1	Çukurova Belediyespor	25–19	20–25	25–20	25–11		95–75	Report
16 Mar 2024	20:00	PTT	1–3	Eczacıbaşı Dynavit	25–22	20–25	13–25	23–25		81–97	Report
17 Mar 2024	14:00	Muratpaşa Belediyesi SigortaShop	0–3	Galatasaray Daikin	25–27	13–25	16–25			54–77	Report
17 Mar 2024	14:00	Sarıyer Belediyespor	3–1	Karayolları	25–20	22–25	25–20	25–12		97–77	Report
17 Mar 2024	14:00	Türk Hava Yolları	3–0	Aydın Büyükşehir Belediyespor	25–16	26–24	25–15			76–55	Report
17 Mar 2024	14:00	VakıfBank	3–1	Kuzeyboru	22–25	25–19	25–11	25–16		97–71	Report
19 Mar 2024	17:00	Nilüfer Belediyespor	3–0	Beşiktaş Ayos	25–21	25–15	25–22			75–58	Report

== Play-Offs ==
Note: All times are TRT (UTC+3) as listed by the Turkish Volleyball Federation.

=== Championship bracket ===
Semifinals
1 Apr – 4 Apr 2024
1 Fenerbahçe Opet	3	3
4 THY	0	1
1 Apr – 4 Apr 2024
2 VakıfBank	1	0
3 Eczacıbaşı	3	3

Final
9 Apr – 12 Apr 2024
1 Fenerbahçe Opet	3	2	3	0	3
3 Eczacıbaşı	1	3	0	3	0
3rd place match
9 Apr – 21 Apr 2024
2 VakıfBank	3	3
4 THY	0	0

==== Semifinal ====
Date	Time		Score		Set 1	Set 2	Set 3	Set 4	Set 5	Total	Report
1º x 4º
1 Apr 2024	17:00	Türk Hava Yolları	0–3	Fenerbahçe Opet	18–25	20–25	16–25			54–75	Report
4 Apr 2024	17:00	Fenerbahçe Opet	3–1	Türk Hava Yolları	25–23	17–25	25–23	25–14		92–85	Report
2º x 3º
1 Apr 2024	20:00	Eczacıbaşı Dynavit	3–1	VakıfBank	25–11	23–25	25–21	25–15		98–72	Report
4 Apr 2024	20:00	VakıfBank	0–3	Eczacıbaşı Dynavit	23–25	20–25	22–25			65–75	Report

==== Third place game ====
Date	Time		Score		Set 1	Set 2	Set 3	Set 4	Set 5	Total	Report
9 Apr 2024	13:00	Türk Hava Yolları	0–3	VakıfBank	20–25	19–25	18–25			57–75	Report
12 Apr 2024	16:00	VakıfBank	3–0	Türk Hava Yolları	25–22	25–22	25–14			75–58	Report

==== Final ====
Date	Time		Score		Set 1	Set 2	Set 3	Set 4	Set 5	Total	Report
9 Apr 2024	19:00	Eczacıbaşı Dynavit	1–3	Fenerbahçe Opet	22–25	27–25	23–25	25–27		97–102	Report
13 Apr 2024	19:00	Fenerbahçe Opet	2–3	Eczacıbaşı Dynavit	25–21	22–25	25–14	14–25	9–15	95–100	Report
15 Apr 2024	19:00	Fenerbahçe Opet	3–0	Eczacıbaşı Dynavit	25–18	25–19	25–22			75–59	Report
18 Apr 2024	18:00	Eczacıbaşı Dynavit	3–0	Fenerbahçe Opet	25–21	25–21	25–21			75–63	Report
21 Apr 2024	19:00	Fenerbahçe Opet	3–0	Eczacıbaşı Dynavit	25–18	25–22	27–25			77–65	Report

=== Classification bracket ===
Classification 5th–8th
2 Apr – 5 Apr 2024
5 Kuzeyboru	3	3
8 Muratpaşa Belediyesi SigortaShop	0	1
2 Apr – 5 Apr 2024
6 Galatasaray Daikin	3	3
7 Nilüfer Belediyespor	0	1

Fifth place
10 Apr – 15 Apr 2024
5 Kuzeyboru	3	2	3
6 Galatasaray Daikin	2	3	1
Seventh place
10 Apr – 13 Apr 2024
7 Nilüfer Belediyespor	3	3
8 Muratpaşa Belediyesi SigortaShop	0	0

==== Play-off 5th–8th ====
Date	Time		Score		Set 1	Set 2	Set 3	Set 4	Set 5	Total	Report
5º x 8º
2 Apr 2024	17:00	Muratpaşa Belediyesi SigortaShop	0–3	Kuzeyboru	21–25	20–25	13–25			54–75	Report
5 Apr 2024	17:00	Kuzeyboru	3–1	Muratpaşa Belediyesi SigortaShop	25–23	25–20	20–25	25–18		95–86	Report
6º x 7º
2 Apr 2024	17:00	Nilüfer Belediyespor	0–3	Galatasaray Daikin	23–25	15–25	22–25			60–75	Report
5 Apr 2024	17:00	Galatasaray Daikin	3–1	Nilüfer Belediyespor	19–25	25–21	25–14	25–20		94–80	Report

==== Seventh place game ====
Date	Time		Score		Set 1	Set 2	Set 3	Set 4	Set 5	Total	Report
10 Apr 2024	15:00	Muratpaşa Belediyesi SigortaShop	0–3	Nilüfer Belediyespor	21–25	10–25	22–25			53–75	Report
13 Apr 2024	14:00	Nilüfer Belediyespor	3–0	Muratpaşa Belediyesi SigortaShop	25–16	25–22	25–17			75–55	Report

==== Fifth place game ====
Date	Time		Score		Set 1	Set 2	Set 3	Set 4	Set 5	Total	Report
10 Apr 2024	15:00	Galatasaray Daikin	2–3	Kuzeyboru	25–23	19–25	19–25	25–20	7–15	95–108	Report
13 Apr 2024	14:00	Kuzeyboru	2–3	Galatasaray Daikin	25–17	25–22	19–25	20–25	13–15	102–104	Report
15 Apr 2024	16:00	Kuzeyboru	3–1	Galatasaray Daikin	25–18	24–26	25–16	25–19		99–79	Report

== Final standings ==
2024-25 CEV Women's Champions League
2024-25 Women's CEV Cup
2024-25 CEV Women's Challenge Cup
2024 BVA Cup
Relegation

Rank	Team
1	Fenerbahçe Opet
2	Eczacıbaşı Dynavit
3	VakıfBank
4	Türk Hava Yolları
5	Kuzeyboru
6	Galatasaray Daikin
7	Nilüfer Belediyespor
8	Muratpaşa Belediyesi SigortaShop
9	Beşiktaş Ayos
10	Aydın Büyükşehir Belediyespor
11	Çukurova Belediyespor
12	Sarıyer Belediyespor
13	PTT
14	Karayolları

== Player Awards ==
TVF awarded the following awards based on the finals series:

Best Opposite	(Serbia) Tijana Bošković
Best Outside Hitter	(Brazil) Ana Cristina de Souza
Best Middle Blocker	(Turkey) Eda Erdem
Best Setter	(Serbia) Bojana Drča
Best Libero	(Turkey) Gizem Örge
MVP	(Turkey) Melissa Vargas
