= 2020–21 Aydın Büyükşehir Belediyespor season =

Aydın Büyükşehir Belediyespor
2020-21 season
- Chairman: (Turkey) Polat Bora Mersin
- Manager: (Turkey) Alper Hamurcu

Aydın Büyükşehir Belediyespor 2020-21 season is the sixth year of the club's third season in the Turkish Women's Volleyball League. Aydın Büyükşehir Belediyespor started the season with 3 foreign players.

The club competes in:

- Turkish Women's Volleyball League
- Turkish Women's Volleyball Cup

== Team Roster Season 2020-21 ==
No.	Player	Date of birth	Height (m)	Position	Date Attended	Previous Team	Country
1	Anthi Vasilantonaki	19 April 1996	1.96	Wing spiker	2020	Galatasaray	Greece
3	Janset Cemre Erkul	12 January 1997	1.85	Middle blocker	2020	PTT Spor	Turkey
4	Berra Eren	20 September 2001	1.88	Middle blocker	2017	Academy	Turkey
5	Rachael Adams	3 July 1990	1.88	Middle blocker	2020	Saugella Team Monza	United States
6	Maret Balkestein-Grothues	16 September 1988	1.80	Wing spiker	2019	CSM Bucuresti	Netherlands
8	Eylül Akarçeşme	1 October 1999	1.71	Libero	2020	Kale 1957	Turkey
9	Cansu Ayyıldız	21 April 2000	1.85	Wing spiker	2016	Academy	Turkey
10	Ecem Alıcı	1 January 1994	1.81	Wing spiker	2018	Balıkesir Büyükşehir Belediyespor	Turkey
11	Aslıhan Kılıç	21 April 1998	1.78	Setter	2020	PTT Spor	Turkey
12	Pınar Eren	12 December 1986	1.78	Libero	2020	VakıfBank S.K.	Turkey
13	Meryem Boz (C)	3 February 1988	1.90	Outside Hitter	2019	Galatasaray	Turkey
17	Ezgi Dağdelenler	3 November 1993	1.84	Wing spiker	2020	PTT Spor	Turkey
18	Duygu Düzceler	6 April 1990	1.78	Setter	2018	Nilüfer Belediyespor	Turkey
19	Hande Korkut	28 October 1990	1.88	Middle blocker	2019	Nilüfer Belediyespor	Turkey
20	Pelin Özkılıçcı	9 December 1999	1.84	Outside Hitter	2020	Kale 1957	Turkey

== Squad changes for the 2020–2021 season ==
In: Note: Flags indicate national team as defined under FIFA eligibility rules; some limited exceptions apply. Players may hold more than one non-FIFA nationality.

No.	Pos.	Nation	Player
11		TUR	Aslıhan Kılıç (from PTT Spor)
3		TUR	Janset Cemre Erkul (from PTT Spor)
17		TUR	Ezgi Dağdelenler (from PTT Spor)
5		USA	Rachael Adams (from Team Monza)
12		TUR	Pınar Eren (from Vakıfbank S.K.)
1		GRE	Anthi Vasilantonaki (from Galatasaray)
8		TUR	Eylül Akarçeşme (from Çan Gençlik Kale SK)

Out: Note: Flags indicate national team as defined under FIFA eligibility rules; some limited exceptions apply. Players may hold more than one non-FIFA nationality.

No.	Pos.	Nation	Player
2		TUR	Erçe Su Kasapoğlu (to Beşiktaş)
7		TUR	Selin Hazal Arifoğlu (to Galatasaray)
11		TUR	Ezgi Dilik (to Beşiktaş)
12		TUR	Bihter Dumanoğlu (Yeşilyurt S.K.)
8		TUR	Semra Özer (to PTT Spor)
18		TUR	Ece Hocaoğlu (to Yeşilyurt S.K.)
4		NED	Celeste Plak (to)
15		BEL	Dominika Sobolska (to CSM Târgoviște)

== Results, schedules and standings ==
=== Regular Season First Half ===
Date	Time		Score		Set 1	Set 2	Set 3	Set 4	Set 5	Total	Report
11 September	19:00	Aydın Büyükşehir Belediyespor	3–2	Galatasaray HDI Sigorta	14–25	27–25	26–28	25–22	15–13	107–113	report
15 September	17:30	VakıfBank S.K.	3–0	Aydın Büyükşehir Belediyespor	25–18	25–14	25–23			75–55	report
19 September	15:00	Aydın Büyükşehir Belediyespor	3–0	İlbank S.K.	25–19	25–23	27–25			77–67	report
22 September	17:00	Kuzeyboru	3–1	Aydın Büyükşehir Belediyespor	25–18	25–20	17–25	25-19		92–63	report
26 September	15:00	Aydın Büyükşehir Belediyespor	3–0	Beylikdüzü Voleybol İhtisas	25–18	25–13	25–8			75–39	report
29 September	14:00	Sistem9 Yeşilyurt	2–3	Aydın Büyükşehir Belediyespor	28–26	23–25	11–25	25-22	12-15	99–76	report
3 October	15:00	Aydın Büyükşehir Belediyespor	3–0	Beşiktaş	25–15	25–13	25–17			75–45	report
10 October	20:00	Fenerbahçe Opet	3–0	Aydın Büyükşehir Belediyespor	25–21	25–21	25-17			75–42	report
13 October	17:00	Aydın Büyükşehir Belediyespor	1-3	Eczacıbaşı VitrA	14–25	25–20	18–25	18-25		75–70	report
17 October	18:00	Nilüfer Belediyespor	3–1	Aydın Büyükşehir Belediyespor	25–19	25–18	17-25	30-28		97–37	report
24 October	15:00	Aydın Büyükşehir Belediyespor	3-1	PTT Spor	19–25	25–18	25–23	25-20		94–66	report
27 October	14:00	Çan Gençlik Kale SK	0–3	Aydın Büyükşehir Belediyespor	19-25	19-25	21-25			59–0	report
31 October	15:00	Aydın Büyükşehir Belediyespor	3-1	Karayolları	25-15	21–25	28–26	17-25	15-11	106–51	report
3 November	17:00	Sarıyer Belediyespor	1–3	Aydın Büyükşehir Belediyespor	19-25	25-23	18-25	23-25		85–0	report
7 November	17:00	Türk Hava Yolları	3-1	Aydın Büyükşehir Belediyespor	25-18	20-25	25-19	28-26		98–0	report

=== Regular Season Second Half ===
Date	Time		Score		Set 1	Set 2	Set 3	Set 4	Set 5	Total	Report
15 November	13:00	Galatasaray HDI Sigorta	3-1	Aydın Büyükşehir Belediyespor	19-25	25-23	25-21	25-19		94–0	report
18 November	13:00	Aydın Büyükşehir Belediyespor	1-3	VakıfBank	8-25	14–25	25–22	15-25		62–47	report
22 November	13:00	İlbank	0-3	Aydın Büyükşehir Belediyespor	18-25	22-25	24-26			64–0	report
29 November	15:00	Aydın Büyükşehir Belediyespor	3-2	Kuzeyboru	26-24	25–18	21–25	23-25	15-7	110–43	report
3 December	15:30	Beylikdüzü Voleybol İhtisas	0-3	Aydın Büyükşehir Belediyespor	8-25	15-25	20-25			43–0	report
6 December	15:00	Aydın Büyükşehir Belediyespor	3-2	Yeşilyurt	20-25	25–23	17–25	25-9	16-14	103–48	report
12 December	15:30	Beşiktaş	0-3	Aydın Büyükşehir Belediyespor	12-25	18-25	8-25			38–0	report
