= 2022–23 Turkish Women's Volleyball League =

- League: Turkish Women's Volleyball League
- Sport: Volleyball
- Teams: 14

Regular season
- Season champions: Eczacıbaşı Dynavit

Final
- Champions: Fenerbahçe
- Runners-up: Eczacıbaşı Dynavit
- Finals MVP: Melissa Vargas

Turkish Women's Volleyball League seasons
- 2021–22 2023–24

The 2022–23 Turkish Women's Volleyball League is the 40th volleyball tournament year and the top-level women's volleyball tournament of the newly branded and reorganized Turkish Women's Volleyball League. The winner, runner-up and third of Turkish Women's Volleyball League will play in CEV Champions League league round and 4th place will play in CEV Cup main phase. The 5th place will play in CEV Challenge Cup main phase while the last 2 teams in the Turkish Women's Volleyball League will be relegated to the Second League. The last season's champion is VakıfBank, who have won the league 13 times.

== Personnel ==
Club	Head coach	Captain	City
Aydın Büyükşehir	(Turkey) Alper Hamurcu	(Turkey) Fatma Yıldırım	Aydın
Bolu Belediyespor	(Turkey) Salih Yergin	(Turkey) Ceren Kapucu	Bolu
Çukurova Belediyespor	(Turkey) Mustafa Umut	(Turkey) Güldeniz Önal	Adana
Eczacıbaşı Dynavit	(Turkey) Ferhat Akbaş	(Serbia) Tijana Bošković	Istanbul
Fenerbahçe	(Serbia) Zoran Terzić	(Turkey) Eda Erdem	Istanbul
Galatasaray	(Turkey) Ataman Güneyligil	(Turkey) Gizem Güreşen	Istanbul
İlbank	(Turkey) Mehmet Duygun	(Turkey) Suna Erel	Ankara
Kuzeyboru	(Turkey) Mehmet Kamil	(Turkey) Arelya Karasoy	Aksaray
Nilüfer Belediyespor	(Belgium) Vital Heynen	(Turkey) Hümay Fırıncıoğlu	Bursa
PTT	(Turkey) Mehmet Bedestenlioğlu	(Turkey) Merve Tanyel	Ankara
Sarıyer Belediyespor	(Turkey) Hasan Çelik	(Turkey) Merve Tanil	Istanbul
SigortaShop	(Turkey) Dehri Can Dehrioğlu	(Turkey) Tuğçe Ceyhan	Ankara
Türk Hava Yolları	(Italy) Marcello Abbondanza	(Turkey) Şeyma Ercan	Istanbul
VakıfBank	(Italy) Giovanni Guidetti	(Brazil) Gabriela Guimarães	Istanbul

== Foreign players ==
The number of foreign players is more than one per club but still not more than 3 in the field.

Team	Player 1	Player 2	Player 3	Player 4	Player 5
Aydın Büyükşehir	(Italy) Anna Nicoletti	(Italy) Sara Loda	(Slovenia) Saša Planinšec	—N/a	—N/a
Bolu Belediyespor	(Ukraine) Bogdana Anisova	(Cuba) Heidy Casanova	(Ukraine) Nadiia Kodola	(Czech Republic) Sarah Cruz	(United States) TeTori Dixon
Çukurova Belediyespor	(Peru) Ángela Leyva	(Serbia) Katarina Lazović	(Italy) Lucia Bosetti	(Azerbaijan) Olena Kharchenko	(Ukraine) Olesia Rykhliuk
Eczacıbaşı Dynavit	(Russia) Irina Voronkova	(Belgium) Laura Heyrman	(Serbia) Maja Ognjenović	(Croatia) Samanta Fabris	(Serbia) Tijana Bošković
Fenerbahçe	(Brazil) Ana Cristina	(Russia) Anna Lazareva	(Russia) Arina Fedorovtseva	(Bulgaria) Hristina Ruseva	(Brazil) Macris Carneiro
Galatasaray	(Greece) Anthi Vasilantonaki	(United States) Katherine Bell	(United States) Logan Eggleston	(Serbia) Mina Popović	—N/a
İlbank	—N/a	—N/a	—N/a	—N/a	—N/a
Kuzeyboru	(Brazil) Ana Beatriz	(United States) Annie Mitchem	(Belarus) Hanna Klimets	(Bulgaria) Miroslava Paskova	(Azerbaijan) Polina Rahimova
Nilüfer Belediyespor	(Bulgaria) Aleksandra Milanova	(United States) Brooke Nuneviller	(Slovakia) Nikola Radosova	(United States) Sherridan Atkinson	—N/a
PTT	(Serbia) Bianka Buša	(Slovenia) Eva Pavlović	(Serbia) Sara Carić	—N/a	—N/a
Sarıyer Belediyespor	(Thailand) Ajcharaporn Kongyot	(Thailand) Chatchu-on Moksri	(Germany) Kimberly Drewniok	—N/a	—N/a
SigortaShop	(Belgium) Ilka Van de Vyver	(United States) Kelsie Payne	(United States) Marin Grote	(Czech Republic) Michaela Mlejnková	—N/a
Türk Hava Yolları	(Canada) Emily Maglio	(Germany) Hanna Orthmann	(Canada) Kiera Van Ryk	(United States) Madison Kingdon	—N/a
VakıfBank	(United States) Chiaka Ogbogu	(Brazil) Gabriela Guimarães	(United States) Kara Bajema	(Netherlands) Nika Daalderop	(Italy) Paola Egonu

Source: Teams 2022/2023

== League table ==
Pos	Team	Pld	W	L	Pts	SW	SL	SR	SPW	SPL	SPR	Qualification or relegation
1	Eczacıbaşı	26	26	0	76	78	7	11.143	2102	1662	1.265	Play-off (1st-4th)
2	VakıfBank	26	23	3	68	69	16	4.313	2064	1698	1.216	Play-off (1st-4th)
3	Fenerbahçe	26	22	4	66	69	19	3.632	2108	1663	1.268	Play-off (1st-4th)
4	Türk Hava Yolları	26	18	8	55	63	33	1.909	2179	1952	1.116	Play-off (1st-4th)
5	Galatasaray	26	17	9	50	57	42	1.357	2221	2094	1.061	Play-off (5th-8th)
6	Nilüfer Belediyespor	26	15	11	43	51	48	1.063	2159	2144	1.007	Play-off (5th-8th)
7	Sarıyer Belediyespor	26	14	12	37	48	51	0.941	2127	2167	0.982	Play-off (5th-8th)
8	Aydın Büyükşehir Belediyespor	26	10	16	34	46	60	0.767	2291	2341	0.979	Play-off (5th-8th)
9	Çukurova Belediyespor	26	10	16	30	39	55	0.709	2022	2098	0.964	
10	Kuzeyboru	26	9	17	27	36	58	0.621	2020	2185	0.924	
11	PTT	26	9	17	26	38	61	0.623	2014	2202	0.915	
12	Sigorta Shop	26	5	21	21	40	70	0.571	2270	2431	0.934	
13	Bolu Belediyespor	26	4	22	13	28	70	0.400	1963	2272	0.864	Turkish Women's Volleyball First League
14	İlbank	26	0	26	0	6	78	0.077	1453	2084	0.697	Turkish Women's Volleyball First League

Source: TVF
Rules for classification: 1) Games won 2) Points 3) Set ratio 4) Setpoint ratio

== Final round ==
Note: All times are TRT (UTC+3) as listed by the Turkish Volleyball Federation.

=== Championship bracket ===
Semifinals
3 May – 5 May
1 Eczacıbaşı Dynavit	3	3
4 Türk Hava Yolları	2	1
3 May – 5 May
2 VakıfBank	1	3
3 Fenerbahçe	3	0

Final
7 May – 11 May
1 Eczacıbaşı Dynavit	1	2	2
3 Fenerbahçe	3	3	3
3rd place match
7 May – 9 May
2 VakıfBank	3	3
4 Türk Hava Yolları	1	1

==== Semifinal ====
Date	Time		Score		Set 1	Set 2	Set 3	Set 4	Set 5	Total	Report
1º x 4º
3 May	16:00	Türk Hava Yolları	2–3	Eczacıbaşı Dynavit	27–25	25–22	15–25	16–25	6–15	89–112	Report
5 May	16:00	Eczacıbaşı Dynavit	3–1	Türk Hava Yolları	25–22	25–21	21–25	25–20		96–88	Report
2º x 3º
3 May	19:00	Fenerbahçe	3–1	VakıfBank	21–25	25–13	25–19	25–16		96–73	Report
5 May	19:00	VakıfBank	3–0	Fenerbahçe	25–23	25–17	25–21			75–61	Report
Golden set		VakıfBank	11–15	Fenerbahçe							

==== Third place game ====
Date	Time		Score		Set 1	Set 2	Set 3	Set 4	Set 5	Total	Report
7 May	18:00	Türk Hava Yolları	1–3	VakıfBank	18–25	20–25	25–23	8–25		71–98	Report
9 May	16:00	VakıfBank	3–1	Türk Hava Yolları	25–20	25–27	25–11	25–19		100–77	Report

==== Final ====
Date	Time		Score		Set 1	Set 2	Set 3	Set 4	Set 5	Total	Report
7 May	15:00	Fenerbahçe	3–1	Eczacıbaşı Dynavit	20–25	25–14	25–21	25–17	95–77	190–154	Report
9 May	19:30	Eczacıbaşı Dynavit	2–3	Fenerbahçe	18–25	25–23	16–25	25–17	10–15	94–105	Report
11 May	19:30	Eczacıbaşı Dynavit	2–3	Fenerbahçe	26–28	25–21	21–25	26–24	8–15	106–113	Report

=== Classification bracket ===
Classification 5th–8th
3 May – 6 May
5 Galatasaray	3	3
8 Aydın Büyükşehir	2	1
3 May – 6 May
6 Nilüfer Belediyespor	3	3
7 Sarıyer Belediyespor	0	1

Fifth place
9 May – 12 May
5 Galatasaray	1	1
6 Nilüfer Belediyespor	3	3
Seventh place
9 May – 12 May
7 Sarıyer Belediyespor	1	1
8 Aydın Büyükşehir	3	3

==== Classification 5th–8th ====
Date	Time		Score		Set 1	Set 2	Set 3	Set 4	Set 5	Total	Report
5º x 8º
3 May	18:00	Aydın Büyükşehir	2–3	Galatasaray	18–25	23–25	25–21	25–17	12–15	103–103	Report
6 May	13:00	Galatasaray	3–1	Aydın Büyükşehir	25–27	25–9	25–23	25–17		100–76	Report
6º x 7º
3 May	17:00	Sarıyer Belediyespor	0–3	Nilüfer Belediyespor	15–25	21–25	19–25			55–75	Report
6 May	17:00	Nilüfer Belediyespor	3–1	Sarıyer Belediyespor	22–25	25–19	25–20	25–19		97–83	Report

==== Seventh place game ====
Date	Time		Score		Set 1	Set 2	Set 3	Set 4	Set 5	Total	Report
9 May	18:00	Aydın Büyükşehir	3–1	Sarıyer Belediyespor	21–25	26–24	25–18	26–24		98–91	Report
12 May	16:00	Sarıyer Belediyespor	1–3	Aydın Büyükşehir	20–25	17–25	25–22	18–25		80–97	Report

==== Fifth place game ====
Date	Time		Score		Set 1	Set 2	Set 3	Set 4	Set 5	Total	Report
9 May	18:00	Nilüfer Belediyespor	3–1	Galatasaray	25–20	25–13	23–25	25–19		98–77	Report
12 May	19:00	Galatasaray	1–3	Nilüfer Belediyespor	22–25	17–25	25–21	23–25		87–96	Report

== Final standing ==
2023-24 CEV Women's Champions League
2023-24 Women's CEV Cup
2023-24 CEV Women's Challenge Cup
2023 BVA Cup
2023-24 1. League

Rank	Team
1	Fenerbahçe
2	Eczacıbaşı Dynavit
3	VakıfBank
4	Türk Hava Yolları
5	Nilüfer Belediyespor
6	Galatasaray
7	Aydın Büyükşehir
8	Sarıyer Belediyespor
9	Çukurova Belediyespor
10	Kuzeyboru
11	PTT
12	SigortaShop
13	Bolu Belediyespor
14	İlbank
