= Kasapoğlu =

Kasapoğlu is a Turkish surname. People with the surname include:

- Alper Kasapoğlu (born 1966), Turkish athlete,
- Erçe Su Kasapoğlu (born 1996), Turkish volleyball player
- Koço Kasapoğlu (1935–2016), Greek-Turkish football player and manager,
- Mehmet Kasapoğlu (born 1976), Turkish civil servant and former Minister of Youth and Sports,
- Melike Kasapoğlu (born 2004), Turkish female handballer
- Mine Kasapoğlu (born 1979), Turkish sports photographer
