= Mine =

Mine, mines, miners or mining may refer to:

== Extraction or digging ==
- Mining, extraction of mineral resources from the ground through a mine
  - Miner, a person engaged in mining or digging

== Grammar ==
- Mine, a first-person English possessive pronoun

== Military ==
- Land mine, explosive mines placed under or on the ground
  - Anti-tank mine, a land mine made for use against armored vehicles
  - Antipersonnel mine, a land mine targeting people walking around, either with explosives or poison gas
  - Bangalore mine, colloquial name for the Bangalore torpedo, a man-portable explosive device for clearing a path through wire obstacles and land mines
- Naval mine, or sea mine, a mine at sea, either floating or on the sea bed, often dropped via parachute from aircraft, or otherwise lain by surface ships or submarines
  - Parachute mine, an air-dropped "sea mine" falling gently under a parachute, used as a high-capacity cheaply-cased large bomb against ground targets
- Tunnel warfare, digging or mining under a fortified military position to penetrate its defenses

== Places ==
- The Mine, Queensland, a locality in the Rockhampton Region, Australia
- Mine, Saga, a Japanese town
- Mine, Yamaguchi, a Japanese city
  - Mine District, Yamaguchi, a former district in the area of the city

== People ==
=== Given name ===
- Mine Ercan (born 1978), Turkish women's wheelchair basketball player
- Mine Guri, Albanian communist politician
- Mine Kasapoğlu (born 1979), Turkish sports photographer
- Miné Okubo (1912–2001), American artist and writer

=== Surname ===
- Kazuki Mine (born 1993), Japanese football player
- George Ralph Mines (1886–1914), English cardiac electrophysiologist

== Arts, entertainment, and media ==
=== Films ===
- Mine (1985 film), a Turkish film
- Mine (2009 film), an American documentary film
- Mine (2016 film), an Italian-American film
- Abandoned Mine or The Mine, a 2013 horror film
- The Mine (1978 film), Turkish film

=== Literature ===
- Mine (novel), a 1990 novel by Robert R. McCammon
- The Mine (novel), 2012 novel by Arnab Ray

=== Music ===
==== Artists ====
- Mine (singer), German singer-songwriter

==== Albums ====
- Mine (Dolly Parton album), 1973
- Mine (Li Yuchun album), 2007
- Mine (Kim Jaejoong EP), 2013
- Mine (Phoebe Ryan EP), 2015
- (Mine), a 2026 EP by Hilary Duff
- Mines (album), a 2010 album by indie rock band Menomena
- Mine!, a 1994 album released by musical duo Trout Fishing in America

==== Songs ====
- "Mine" (The 1975 song), 2018
- "Mine" (Bazzi song), 2017
- "Mine" (Beyoncé song), 2014
- "Mine" (Kelly Clarkson song), 2023
- "Mine" (Alice Glass song), 2018
- "Mine" (Taylor Swift song), 2010
- "Mine", a song from the 1933 Broadway musical Let 'Em Eat Cake
- "Mine", a song by Aespa from Armageddon
- "Mine", a song by Bebe Rexha from the album Expectations
- "Mine", a song by Dolly Parton from In the Good Old Days (When Times Were Bad)
- "Mine", a song by Everything but the Girl from Everything but the Girl
- "Mine", a song by Ghinzu from Blow
- "Mine", a song by Got7 from Just Right
- "Mine", a song by Ive from I've IVE
- "Mine", a song by Jason Webley from Only Just Beginning
- "Mine", a song by Krezip from Days Like This
- "Mine", a song by Mustasch from Mustasch
- "Mine", a song by Savage Garden from Savage Garden
- "Mine", a song by Sepultura from Roots
- "Mine", a song by Taproot from Welcome
- "Mine", a song by Christina Perri from lovestrong
- "Mine", a song by Disturbed from The Lost Children
- "Mine", a song by M.I from the album The Chairman
- "#Mine", a song by Lil' Kim from Lil Kim Season
- "Mine, Mine, Mine", a song from the soundtrack for the 1995 Disney film Pocahontas

=== Television ===
- Mine (2021 TV series), a South Korean series
- "Mine" (True Blood), a 2008 episode

== Organizations and enterprises ==
- Colorado School of Mines or "Mines", a university in Golden, Colorado, US
- Mine's, a Japanese auto tuning company
- South Dakota School of Mines and Technology, a university in Rapid City, South Dakota, US
- Mines Paris – PSL, an institute of technology in Paris, France

== Science and technology ==
- MINE (chemotherapy), a chemotherapy regimen
- MinE, a bacterial protein
- Data mining, the computational process of discovering patterns in large data sets
- Leaf mine, a space in a leaf
- Mina (unit), or mine, an ancient Greek unit of mass

== See also ==
- Mein (disambiguation)
- Mining (disambiguation)
- Yours (disambiguation)
