= Mein =

Mein may refer to:

== People ==
- Alexander Mein (1854–1927), British soldier who played on the winning side in the 1875 FA Cup Final
- Hannie Mein (1933-2003), Dutch ceramist.
- John Gordon Mein (1913-1968), United States ambassador to Guatemala, the first to be assassinated while in service
- Will G. Mein (1866 -1939), a British book illustrator who flourished in the late 19th to early 20th century
- William Mein Smith, (1799-1869), a key actor in the early settlement of New Zealand's capital city, Wellington

== Other ==
- Mein clan, an ethnic group living along the Forcados River in Delta State, Nigeria
- Mein (noodles), a variety of Chinese noodles made from wheat
- "Mein" (song), a song by the band Deftones, featuring System of a Down singer Serj Tankian
- "Mein!", in Schubert's song cycle Die schöne Müllerin
- Écoust-Saint-Mein, a commune in the Pas-de-Calais department in France
- Mein (TV series), a 2023 Pakistani series

== See also ==
- Mien (disambiguation)
- Mine (disambiguation)
