= Mining (disambiguation) =

Mining is the extraction of geological materials from the Earth.

Mining may also refer to:

- Mining, Austria, a municipality in Upper Austria
- Mining (military), a siege tactic
- Naval mining
- Data mining, the process of extracting knowledge from a data set
  - Social media mining, extracting data from social media
- Mining (cryptocurrency), the allocation of processing power for cryptocurrency transactions with the expectation of a reward
  - Bitcoin mining see Bitcoin network

== See also ==
- Deep sea mining, extraction from the ocean floor at depths below over 200 metres
- Mine (disambiguation)
- Mianning, the Daoguang Emperor, eighth emperor of the Manchurian Qing dynast
