= Ana Cristina de Souza =

Brazilian volleyball player (born 2004)

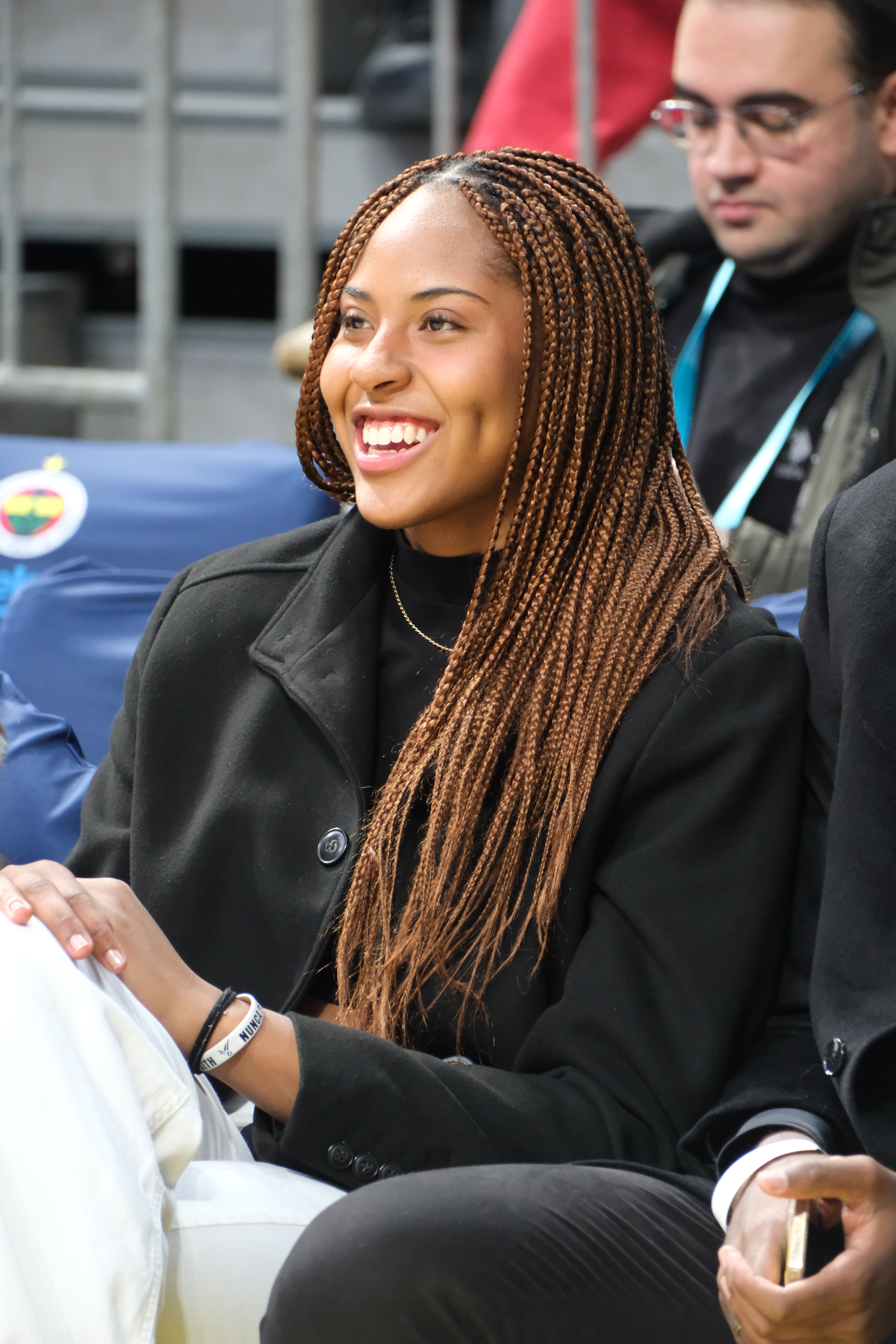
- De Souza in 2024

Personal information
- Full name: Ana Cristina Menezes Oliveira de Souza
- Nationality: Brazilian
- Born: 7 April 2004 (age 22); Rio de Janeiro, Brazil
- Height: 1.93 m (6 ft 4 in)
- Weight: 79 kg (174 lb)
- Spike: 310 cm (120 in)
- Block: 305 cm (120 in)

Volleyball information
- Position: Outside hitter / Opposite
- Current club: (Turkey) Fenerbahçe
- Number: 12

Career
Years	Teams
2020–2021	(Brazil) Sesc Flamengo
2021–	(Turkey) Fenerbahçe

National team
2021–	Brazil
Honours
Women's volleyball
Representing Brazil
Olympic Games
Silver medal – second place	2020 Tokyo	Team
Bronze medal – third place	2024 Paris	Team
Nations League
Silver medal – second place	2021 Rimini	Team
Silver medal – second place	2022 Ankara	Team
Silver medal – second place	2026 Macau	Team
South American Championship
Gold medal – first place	2021 Barrancabermeja
Gold medal – first place	2026 Rio de Janeiro

Ana Cristina Menezes Oliveira de Souza (Brazilian Portuguese pronunciation: [ˈɐnɐ kɾisˈtʃinɐ dʒi ˈso(w)zɐ]; born 7 May 2004) is a Brazilian professional volleyball player who plays for Fenerbahçe and a member of the Brazil national team.

She participated at the 2019 FIVB Volleyball Girls' U18 World Championship, winning a bronze medal and the 2019 FIVB Volleyball Women's U20 World Championship,

De Souza competed for Brazil at the 2020 Summer Olympics, winning silver medal in the women's tournament. She also represented Brazil at the 2024 Summer Olympics and won a bronze medal in the women's tournament.

On the club level, she played for Sesc Flamengo before joined to Fenerbahçe.

== Personal life ==
On 18 May 2025, she got engaged to Brazil international volleyball player Maicon França, with the couple reuniting at Fenerbahçe for the 2025–26 season.

== Awards ==
=== Clubs ===
- 2020–21 Turkish Women's Volleyball League – Runner-Up, with Fenerbahçe Opet
- 2021 FIVB Volleyball Women's Club World Championship - 3rd place, with Fenerbahçe Opet
- 2021–22 CEV Champions League - 3rd place, with Fenerbahçe Opet
- 2021–22 Turkish Women's Volleyball League – Runner-Up, with Fenerbahçe Opet
- 2021–22 Turkish Cup – Runner-Up, with Fenerbahçe Opet
- 2021–22 Turkish Super Cup – Champion, with Fenerbahçe Opet
- 2022-23 CEV Champions League - 3rd place, with Fenerbahçe Opet
- 2022–23 Turkish Volleyball League Champion, with Fenerbahçe Opet
- 2022–23 Turkish Cup – Runner-Up, with Fenerbahçe Opet
- 2023 Turkish Super Cup – Runner-Up, with Fenerbahçe Opet
- 2023-24 CEV Champions League - 3rd place, with Fenerbahçe Opet
- 2023–24 Turkish Volleyball League Champion, with Fenerbahçe Opet
- 2023–24 Turkish Cup Champion, with Fenerbahçe Opet
- 2024 Turkish Super Cup – Champion, with Fenerbahçe Medicana
- 2024–25 Turkish Cup Champion, with Fenerbahçe Medicana
- 2025 Turkish Super Cup – Champion, with Fenerbahçe Medicana

=== Individuals ===
- 2018 South American Championship - Best opposite
- 2019 FIVB U18 World Championship – Best Outside Spiker
- 2020–21 Carioca Championship - Best outside hitter
- 2020–21 Carioca Championship - Best scorer
- 2021 South American Championship – Best opposite spiker
- 2023–24 Turkish Volleyball League - Best outside hitter
