= Mien (disambiguation) =

Mien is an ethnonym for the Yao people of China or the Dao people of Vietnam.

Mien may also refer to:

== Places ==
- Mień, Poland
- Mien (lake), in southern Sweden
- 7706 Mien, a main-belt asteroid
- Mien crater, a meteorite crater in southern Sweden

== People ==
=== Groups of people ===
- Iu Mien Americans, primarily Indochinese refugees who may have been born in or have become naturalized citizens of the U.S.

=== Individuals with the name ===
- Mien Duchateau (1904–1999), Dutch runner
- Mien Marchant (1866-1952), Dutch artist
- Mien Ruys (1904–1999), Dutch landscape and garden architect
- Mien Schopman-Klaver (1911–2018), Dutch athlete
- Mien Suhadi, an Indonesian tennis player
- Mien Sugandhi (1934–2020), Indonesian politician
- Mien van Bree (1915–1983), Dutch cyclist
- Mien van Itallie-Van Embden (1870–1959), Dutch lawyer and politician
- Mien van Wulfften Palthe (1875–1960), Dutch feminist and pacifist
- Đào Thị Miện (born 1981), a Vietnamese footballer
- Wang Mien (1287–1359), Chinese painter
- Vũ Miên (1718–1782), Vietnamese royal historian

== Other uses ==
- Hmong–Mien languages, of Southeast Asia
- Mien, a restaurant at Harrah's Philadelphia
- Mien, Chinese noodles made of wheat
- Mien, one of the old Chinese names of Myanmar

== See also ==
- Mein (disambiguation)
