= Erçe Su Kasapoğlu =

Turkish volleyball player (born 1996)

Personal information
- Nationality: Turkish
- Born: 6 June 1996 (age 30); Istanbul, Turkey
- Height: 1.70 m (5 ft 7 in)
- Weight: 67 kg (148 lb)

Volleyball information
- Position: Libero
- Current club: Beşiktaş JK
- Number: 12

Career
| Years | Teams |
|---|---|
| 2007-2013; 2013-2014; 2014-2015; 2018-2020; 2020- | Fenerbahçe; Eczacıbaşı VitrA; Yeşilyurt Women's Volleyball Team; Aydın Büyükşehir Belediyespor; Beşiktaş JK |

Erçe Su Kasapoğlu (born 6 June 1996) is a Turkish volleyball player. She plays as libero for Beşiktaş JK.

== Career ==
| Club | Years |
|---|---|
| (Turkey) Fenerbahçe | 2007–2013 |
| (Turkey) Eczacıbaşı VitrA | 2013–2014 |
| (Turkey) Yeşilyurt SK | 2014–2015 |
| (Turkey) Bahçelievler SK | 2015–2018 |
| (Turkey) Aydın Büyükşehir Belediyespor | 2018–2020 |
| (Turkey) Beşiktaş JK | 2020– |

== Awards ==
=== Clubs ===
- 2013–14 Turkish Women's Volleyball League – Bronze Medal, with Eczacıbaşı VitrA
- 2014–15 Turkish Women's Volleyball Turkish Women's Volleyball First League – Champion, with Yeşilyurt SK
- 2018–19 CEV Women's Challenge Cup Runner-Up, with Aydın Büyükşehir Belediyespor

== See also ==
- Turkish women in sports
