= Mine (2009 film) =

American documentary film

- Film poster
- Directed by: Geralyn Pezanoski
- Written by: Erin Essenmacher; Geralyn Pezanoski
- Release date: March 21, 2009 (SXSW)
- Running time: 81 minutes
- Country: United States
- Language: English

Mine is a 2009 American documentary film by Geralyn Pezanoski about pets that were abandoned during Hurricane Katrina and efforts to reunite the pets with their owners.

== Reception ==
The film gained a mostly positive reception from critics.
