= Hazal Selin Uygur =

Turkish volleyball player (born 1992)

Hazal Selin Arifoğlu

Personal information
- Full name: Hazal Selin Arifoğlu
- Born: August 18, 1992 (age 34); Ankara, Turkey
- Height: 1.85 m (6 ft 1 in)
- Weight: 70 kg (150 lb)
- Spike: 285 cm (112 in)
- Block: 280 cm (110 in)

Volleyball information
- Position: Middle Blocker
- Current club: Kuzeyboru GSK
- Number: 8

Career
Years
- 2000–2007
- 2007–2011
- 2011–2012
- 2012–2013
- 2013–2014
- 2014–2015
- 2015–2016
- 2016–2017
- 2017–2019
- 2019–2020
- 2020–2021
- 2021–
Teams
- TED Ankara Kolejliler
- Eczacıbaşı VitrA
- Karşıyaka
- Yeşilyurt
- Eczacıbaşı VitrA
- Yeşilyurt
- Çanakkale Belediyespor
- Sarıyer Belediyespor
- Nilüfer Belediyespor
- Aydın Büyükşehir Belediyespor
- Galatasaray
- Kuzeyboru GSK

National team
Turkey

Hazal Selin Arifoğlu (born August 18, 1992, in Ankara, Turkey) is a Turkish volleyball player. She is 185 cm (6.07 ft) tall at 70 kg (150 lb) and plays in the middle blocker position for Kuzeyboru GSK.

== Career ==
On 13 August 2020, she signed a 1-year contract with the Galatasaray Women's Volleyball Team.
