= Ezgi Dilik =

Turkish volleyball player (born 1995)

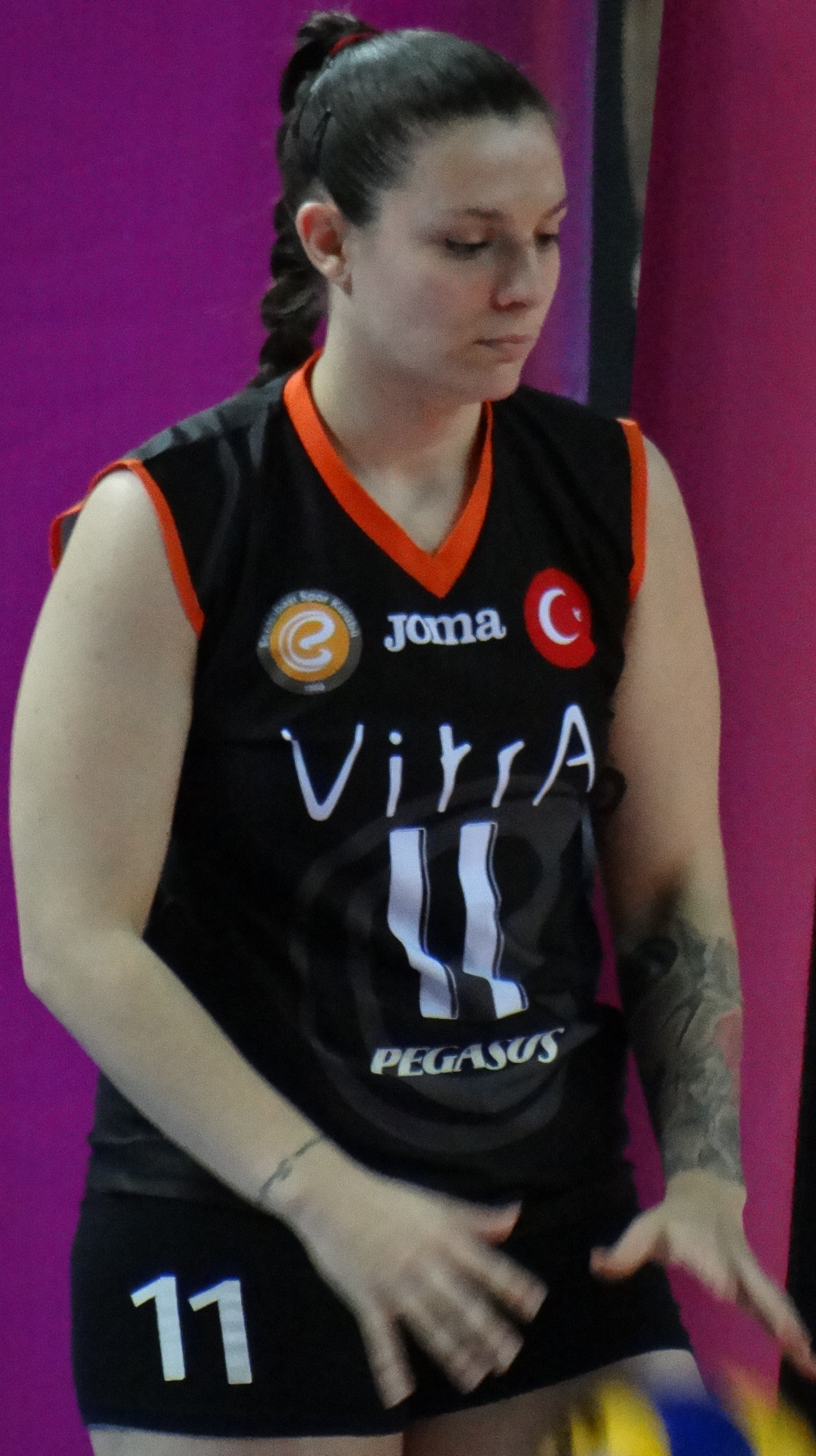

Personal information
- Born: 12 June 1995 (age 31); Ankara, Turkey
- Height: 1.70 m (5 ft 7 in)
- Weight: 68 kg (150 lb)
- Spike: 282 cm (111 in)
- Block: 278 cm (109 in)

Volleyball information
- Position: Setter
- Current club: Aydın Büyükşehir Belediyespor
- Number: 11

Career
Years
- 2007–2008
- 2008–2009
- 2009–2012
- 2012–2014
- 2014–2017
- 2017–
Teams
- Eczacıbaşı VitrA
- Vakıfbank
- Fenerbahçe
- Sarıyer Belediyesi (loan)
- Fenerbahçe
- Eczacıbaşı VitrAAydın Büyükşehir Belediyespor
Honours
Women's volleyball
Representing Turkey
Women's European Volleyball League
Gold medal – first place	2014 Germany/Turkey	Team
Silver medal – second place	2015 Hungary	Team
Women's U23 World Championship
Gold medal – first place	2017 Ljubljana	Team
Silver medal – second place	2015 Ankara	Team
- Last updated: 19 August 2015

Ezgi Dilik (born 12 June 1995 in Ankara, Turkey) is an Aydın Büyükşehir Belediyespor volleyball player.

== Personal life ==
She is 178 cm (5.84 ft) tall at 68 kg (150 lb).

== Career ==
=== Clubs ===
Dilik began her sports career in the youth team of Eczacıbaşı VitrA, and transferred later to Vakıfbank. Her next club became Fenerbahçe, where she played three seasons. For the last two seasons, she was loaned out to Sarıyer Belediyesi. For the 2014–15 season, she returned to her club Fenerbahçe. In 2017–2018, she play with Eczacıbaşı VitrA again.

=== International ===
Dilik was a member of the Turkey women's national volleyball team, which won the 2014 Women's European Volleyball League.

== Honours ==
=== National team ===
- 2014 Women's European Volleyball League - Gold
- 2015 FIVB Volleyball Women's U23 World Championship - Silver
- 2015 Women's European Volleyball League – Silver

=== Club ===
- 2015 Turkish Super Cup - Runner-Up, with Fenerbahçe Grundig
- 2014-15 Turkish Cup - Champion, with Fenerbahçe Grundig
- 2014–15 Turkish Women's Volleyball League - Champion, with Fenerbahçe Grundig
- 2014-15 Turkish Super Cup - Champion, with Fenerbahçe Grundig
- 2016-17 Turkish Cup - Champion, with Fenerbahçe
- 2016–17 Turkish Women's Volleyball League - Champion, with Fenerbahçe

== See also ==
- Turkish women in sports
