= Sarıyer Belediyespor women's volleyball =

Sarıyer Belediyesi Spor Kulübü
- Full name: Sarıyer Belediyesi Spor Kulübü
- Short name: Sarıyer Belediyesi
- Founded: 1990
- Ground: Sarıyer Kapali Spor Salonu
- Chairman: Semra Kartal
- Manager: Didem Ege Akman
- League: Sultanlar Ligi
- 2019–20: Regular: 12th Play-out: 11th
- Website: Club home page

Uniforms
Home	Away

Sarıyer Belediyesi Spor Kulübü is the women's volleyball club based in Sarıyer District of Istanbul Province, Turkey.

== History ==
=== 2012 ===
After two undefeated seasons, claiming the championship from the League 3 and League 2, Sariyer climbed to the Turkish First League.

Sarıyer won the First Bosphorus International Tournament, played in their home court as a pre-season tournament in late September, defeating the German team Alemannia Aachen. Emel Çelikpazı was awarded best server.

== Colors ==
The club colors are navy and white.

== Current squad ==
Squad as of season 2021–22

Shirt No	Nationality	Player	Birth Date	Position	Height
1	United States	Naya Crittenden	15 July 1995 (age 31)	Opposite hitter	1.86
3	Turkey	Gülce Güçtekin	10 October 2002 (age 23)	Libero	1.65
4	Turkey	Ecem Alici	1 January 1994 (age 32)	Outside hitter	1.81
6	Turkey	Lila Şengün	2 March 2002 (age 24)	Setter	1.86
7	Turkey	Ada Germen	24 June 1997 (age 29)	Outside hitter	1.84
8	Turkey	Sezen Keşkekoğlu	10 October 2001 (age 24)	Middle-blocker	1.83
9	Serbia	Aleksandra Crnčević	30 May 1987 (age 39)	Outside hitter	1.84
10	Turkey	Merve Tanıl	22 February 1990 (age 36)	Setter	1.79
11	Turkey	Hanife Nur Özaydinli	1 November 2002 (age 23)	Middle-blocker	1.88
12	Turkey	Hande Naz Şimşek	4 July 1995 (age 31)	Middle-blocker	1.87
14	Turkey	Pelin Eroktay	14 November 2004 (age 21)	Opposite hitter	1.89
17	Turkey	Begüm Hepkaptan	25 June 1997 (age 29)	Middle-blocker	1.82
18	Thailand	Ajcharaporn Kongyot	18 June 1995 (age 31)	Outside hitter	1.80
19	Thailand	Chatchu-on Moksri	6 September 1999 (age 27)	Outside hitter	1.80
20	Turkey	Tuna Aybüke Cetinay	26 April 2002 (age 24)	Libero	1.62

== Technical and managerial staff ==
Technical Team as of season 2020–21

Name	Job
(Turkey) Gökhan Rahman Çokşen	Head coach
(Turkey) Engin Özbek	Assistant coach
(Turkey) Ibrahim Cadir	2nd Assistant Coach
(Turkey) Fikret Ceylan	Statistician
(Turkey) Daniela Mitkova Selami	Physiotherapist

== Honours ==
=== Turkish championships (2) ===
- Turkish Women's Volleyball League 2:
  - Winners 2011–12
- Turkish Women's Volleyball League 3:
  - Winners 2010–11

== Notable players ==
Criteria

To appear in this section a player must have either:

- Played at least one season for the club.
- Set a club record or won an individual award while at the club.
- Played at least one official international match for their national team at any time.
- To perform very successfully during period in the club or at later/previous stages of his career.

Azerbaijan

- Katerina Zhidkova
- Nikalina Bashnakova

Belgium

- Dominika Strumilo

Bosnia and Herzegovina

- Dajana Bošković

Brazil

- Raquel Silva

Bulgaria

- Eva Yaneva

Croatia

- Mira Topić

Cuba

- Yaima Ortiz
- Yusidey Silié

Dominican Republic

- Prisilla Rivera

Germany

- Kimberly Drewniok

Kenya

- Brackcides Khadambi

Puerto Rico

- Áurea Cruz

Serbia
Tijana Malešević

- Ivana Djerisilo
- Aleksandra Crnčević

Slovakia

- Alica Székelyová

Thailand

- Ajcharaporn Kongyot
- Chatchu-On Moksri

Turkey

- Ecem Alici
- Seray Altay
- Beyza Arıcı
- Hazal Selin Arifoğlu
- Hande Baladın
- Funda Bilgi
- Meryem Boz
- Damla Çakıroğlu
- Cansu Çetin
- Ezgi Dilik
- Ceren Nur Domaç
- Melis Durul
- Zülfiye Gündoğdu
- Esra Gümüş
- Arelya Karasoy
- Büşra Kılıçlı
- Simay Kurt
- Lila Sengün
- Merve Tanıl
- Gözde Yılmaz
- Özgenur Yurtdagülen

United States

- Alexis Crimes
- Nicole Fawcett
- Regan Hood Scott
- Madison Rigdon
- Naya Crittenden

Players written in italic still play for the club.

== See also ==
- See also Turkey women's national volleyball team
