= Mine Kasapoğlu =

Turkish photographer (born 1979)

- Born: 1979 (age 46–47); Turkey
- Other names: Mine Kasapoğlu Puhrer
- Education: Economics, Philosophy and Studio Art
- Alma mater: Gettysburg College
- Occupations: (2006-2010) Skier and snowboarder; (2002- ) Portrait and sports photographer
- Website: www.minekasapoglu.com

Mine Kasapoğlu Puhrer (born Kasapoğlu in 1979) is a Turkish travelling freelance portrait and sports photographer. She was a former member of the national ski and snowboarding teams, also a coach of the national snowboarding team.

== Sports career ==
Kasapoğlu learned skiing at the Uludağ Ski Resortdi in Bursa, Turkey at the age of only two. As next, she added, snowboarding to her winter sport activities. In 1994, she placed second at the Turkish Ski Championship. She became the Turkish snowboarding champion in 2007. She represented Turkey at ski and snowboarding competitions internationally from 2006 to 2010.

She served as a coach of the Turkey national freestyle and snowboard cross teams. She is a member of the Turkish Fairplay Commission and a member of the Turkish National Olympic Committee.

== Photographer career ==
She worked with Vogue Türkiye for more than six years, and took portraits of artists and athletes. Her portrait photos have been published in Vogue Brazil, Vogue Australia, Condé Nast Traveller Turkiye, Glamour Turkiye, Marie Claire Turkiye, Elle Turkiye, among other publications.

Her clients include some sports-related top companies, sports federations, international and national Olympic and Paralympic committees, social networking services as well as the Soho House. She is currently the brand ambassador of the sports camera Sony Alpha.

Kasapoğlu started taking sports photographs at the 2002 Winter Olympics in Salt Lake City, United States. She went to the 2004 Athens Olympic Games voluntarily. At the Olympics of 2006 Torino, 2008 Beijing and 2012 London, she was the official photographer of the Turkish Olympic Committee. The International Olympic Committee invited her to the 2010 Vancouver Games, the Youth Olympics of 2010 Singapore, 2012 Innsbruck as well as to the European Youth Olympic Festival of 2011 Trabzon. As of May 2019, she has covered sports events at five Winter Olympics, four Summer Olympics and five Youth Olympic Games. She seeks to take shots of the feelings and actions of the world's best athletes in training and competition. She specializes in shooting of swimming, skiing and snowboarding events. Her photographs have been exhibited in various places in Europe, including in Paris, France in 2017, and the Olympic Museum in Lausanne, Switzerland. As an "Eye of the Olympics", she was invited to give a speech on woman and sports photography during a ceremony at the Olympic Museum. She published two books on photography.

== Personal life ==
Mine Kasapoğlu was born in 1979. She studied Economics and Philosophy with a minor in Studio Art at Gettysburg College in Pennsylvania, United States, and graduated with a Bachelor of Arts degree in 1999. She completed an eight-month Professional Photography course at the Photography School Spéos in Paris, France in 2003.

The travelling freelance photographer is based in Istanbul, Turkey and Vienna, Austria.
