= Aydın Büyükşehir Belediyespor =

Turkish women's volleyball team

Aydın Büyükşehir Belediyespor Kulübü
- Full name: Aydın Büyükşehir Belediyespor Kulübü
- Short name: Aydın Büyükşehir Belediyespor
- Founded: 2014
- Ground: Mimar Sinan Spor Salonu, Aydın (Capacity: 2,000)
- Chairman: (Turkey) Polat Bora Mersin
- Captain: (Turkey) Meryem Boz
- League: Sultanlar Ligi; Challenge Cup
- 2024–25: 8th
- Website: Club home page

Uniforms
Home	Away

Aydın Büyükşehir Belediyespor is the women's professional volleyball department of Aydın Büyükşehir Belediyespor Kulübü, a Turkish sports club based in Aydın, Turkey. The team plays its home matches at the Mimar Sinan Spor Salonu hall in Aydın.

Aydın Büyükşehir Belediyespor competed in European cups for the first time in its history in the 2018-19 season, played in the final in the CEV Women's Challenge Cup and won the second medal.

== History ==
Aydın Belediyegücü Sports Club, the sports club of Aydın Municipality that was established in 2010, was changed to Aydın Büyükşehir Belediyespor Club on 11 July 2014. The volleyball branch of the club, which was established as a total of 30 branches under Aydın Büyükşehir Belediyespor Club, competed in the Women's Away Regional League L Group in the first year of its establishment. Although it was his first year, he completed his group in the 2nd place with 8 wins and achieved the success of promotion to the 3rd League.

Playing in the Women's Aroma 3rd League Group A in the 2010-2011 season, Aydın Büyükşehir Belediyespor (Aydın Belediyegücü Spor), 3. In his first year in the league, he finished 9th with 6 wins and 14 losses in 20 matches.

In the 2012-2013 season, he took 2 wins and 18 losses in 20 matches, taking the 11th place in the relegation line, falling to the Regional League in his second year in the 3rd League.

Aydın Büyükşehir Belediyespor (Aydın Belediyegücü Spor), which started the 2013-2014 season with the goal of the 3rd League, was promoted to the 3rd League again as the champion of the Regional League C-Denizli group.

He managed to stay in the league in the 2014-2015 season.

Playing in the 2015-2016 Season 3rd League Women 1st Group, Aydın Büyükşehir Belediyespor finished in 11th place with 2 wins in 21 matches and relegated again.

Aydın Büyükşehir Belediyespor, who succeeded in playing the play-offs in the 2016-2017 season, finished the Play-off B GROUP - (İZMİR) group behind the leader MUĞLA BODRUM İHTİSAS with 2 wins and 1 defeat and was promoted again.

With the removal of the 3rd League in the 2017-2018 season, Aydın Büyükşehir Belediyespor, who will compete in the 2nd League Women's 3rd Group, finished in 11th place again.

When we came to the 2018-2019 season, it bought the rights of Bursa Büyükşehir Belediyespor to participate in the Sultans League and CEV Challenge Cup. Having made a good start to the Vestel Venus Sultans League, Aydın Büyükşehir Belediyespor defeated Turkish Airlines (women's volleyball team) in the first week, Çanakkale Belediyespor in the second week, and Karayolları in the third week with a score of 3-0. Aydın Büyükşehir Belediyespor finished on the dam stage in the second place, Aydın Büyükşehir Belediyespor, which faced Karayolları, Çanakkale Belediyespor and Halkbank in the dam stage, won 3 wins and 3 defeats in 6 matches and completed the dam stage in the 3rd place.

As a result of the addition of the points received at the end of the dam matches to the league matches, it finished in the 10th place as in the league stage and managed to hold on to the league. Playing in the CEV Challenge Cup in the same season, Aydın Büyükşehir Belediyespor matched with Beşiktaş in the last 16 rounds. Aydın Büyükşehir Belediyespor lost 3-1 on the road in the first match, won 3-0 in the second leg of the tour and the match was extended to the golden set. Aydın Büyükşehir Belediyespor won the gold set 15-12 and reached the final of 8. In the final of 8, Aydın Büyükşehir Belediyespor matched with Belgium's Hermes Oostende team, winning the first game 3-0 in Aydın and 3-2 on the road, reaching the quarter-finals. In the quarter-finals, his rival Greek team A.O. Thiras won the first match 3-2 on the road and 3-0 in Aydın and reached the semi-finals. Its opponent in the semifinal was Gen-I Volley Nova Gorica, the Slovenian team. The first match was won 3-2 on the road and 3-1 in Aydın and reached the finals. Its rival in the final was Italy's strongest team Saugella Team Monza. Saugella Team Monza won the first match in Aydın with the set scores of 15-25, 23-25, 17-25. The away game was Saugella Team Monza, who won 3-1 with the set scores of 25–20, 17–25, 25–22, and 25–15. Aydın Büyükşehir Belediyespor finished second in the CEV Challenge Cup, in which it competed for the first time in its history.

finished the 2019-2020 season 7th in the regular season in the Sultans League and qualified for the play-offs, but due to COVID-19, the play-off matches were canceled and the league was registered.

== Honours ==
=== International competitions ===
- CEV Challenge Cup
  - Runners-up (1): 2019

== Team roster ==
No.	Player	Date of birth	Height (m)	Position	Date Attended	Previous Team	Country
7	Fatma Yıldırım	3 October 1990	1.80	Wing spiker	2023	Aydın Büyükşehir Belediyespor	Turkey
8	Nina Stojiljković	1 September 1996	1.78	Setter	2023	Çukurova Belediyesi Spor Kulübü	France
11	Gizem Çerağ Düzeltir	15 April 1996	1.70	Libero	2023	Aydın Büyükşehir Belediyespor	Turkey
12	Ángela Leyva	22 November 1996	1.82	Wing spiker	2023	Çukurova Belediyesi Spor Kulübü	Peru
-	Hilary Howe	16 June 1998	1.84	Wing spiker	2023	Radomka Radom	Canada
-	Aleksandra Rasińska	6 November 1998	1.90	Opposite	2023	Calisia Kalisz	Poland

=== Technical Staff ===
Name	Job
(Turkey) Volkan Zeytin	Volleyball Branch General Manager
(Turkey) Sabri Can	Volleyball Branch Administrative Manager
(Turkey) Alper Hamurcu	Women's Volleyball Team Head Coach
(Turkey) Canberk Tekmen	Women's Volleyball Team Coach
(Turkey) Emirhan Özkan	Women's Volleyball Team Statistics Coach
(Turkey) Ömer Ertik	Women's Volleyball Team Conditioner
(Turkey) Abdulkerim Doğru	Women's Volleyball Team Physiotherapist
(Turkey) Zeynep Seda Uslu	Women's Volleyball Team Mindfulness Coach
(Turkey) Fevzi Kunter	Women's Volleyball Team Masseur
(Turkey) Kadir Doğuş Yılmaz	Women's Volleyball Team Media & Communication Officer

== Notable players ==
Criteria

To appear in this section a player must have either:

- Played at least one season for the club.
- Set a club record or won an individual award while at the club.
- Played at least one official international match for their national team at any time.
- To perform very successfully during period in the club or at later/previous stages of his career.

Domestic Players

Turkey

- Erçe Su Kasapoğlu
- Ezgi Dilik
- İdil Naz Başcan
- Meryem Boz
- Zeynep Sude Demirel
- Bihter Dumanoğlu
- Ece Hocaoğlu
- Ezgi Dağdelenler
- Fulden Ural
- Ecem Alıcı
- Aslıhan Kılıç
- Hazal Selin Arifoğlu

European Players

Netherlands

- Celeste Plak
- Maret Grothues

Greece

- Stella Christodoulou

France

- Nina Stojiljković

Non-European Players

Canada

- Hilary Howe

Dominican Republic

- Brayelin Martínez
- Jineiry Martínez

Peru

- Ángela Leyva

United States

- Rachael Adams

Players written in italic still play for the club.
