= Ezgi Bektaş =

Turkish volleyball player (born 1993)

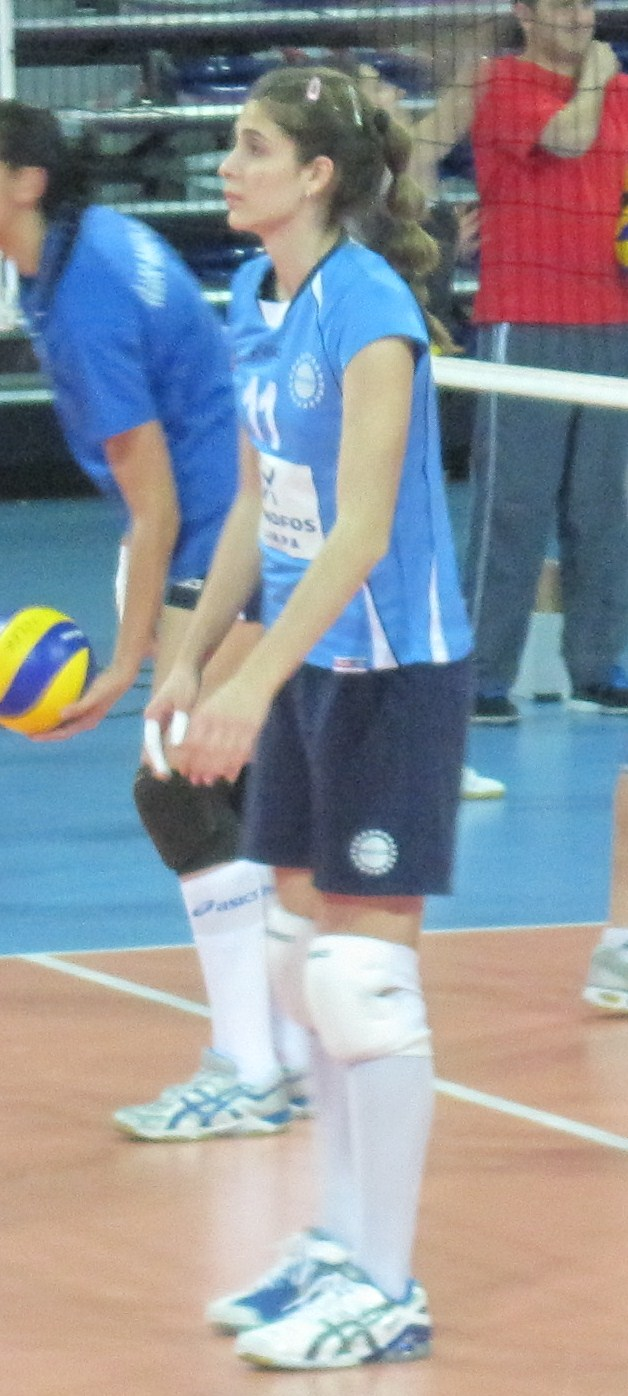
- Bektaş in 2010

Personal information
- Nationality: Turkish
- Born: 3 November 1993 (age 33) Ankara, Turkey
- Height: 184 cm (72 in)
- Weight: 69 kg (152 lb)
- Spike: 290 cm (114 in)
- Block: 269 cm (106 in)

Volleyball information
- Current club: Fenerbahçe
- Number: 25 (national team)

National team
- Years: Team
- 2012: Turkey

Ezgi Bektaş (née Ezgi Dağdelenler; (born 3 November 1993, in Ankara) is a Turkish female volleyball player. She was part of the Turkey women's national volleyball team.

She participated in the 2012 FIVB Volleyball World Grand Prix.
