= Ecem Alıcı =

Turkish volleyball player (born 1994)

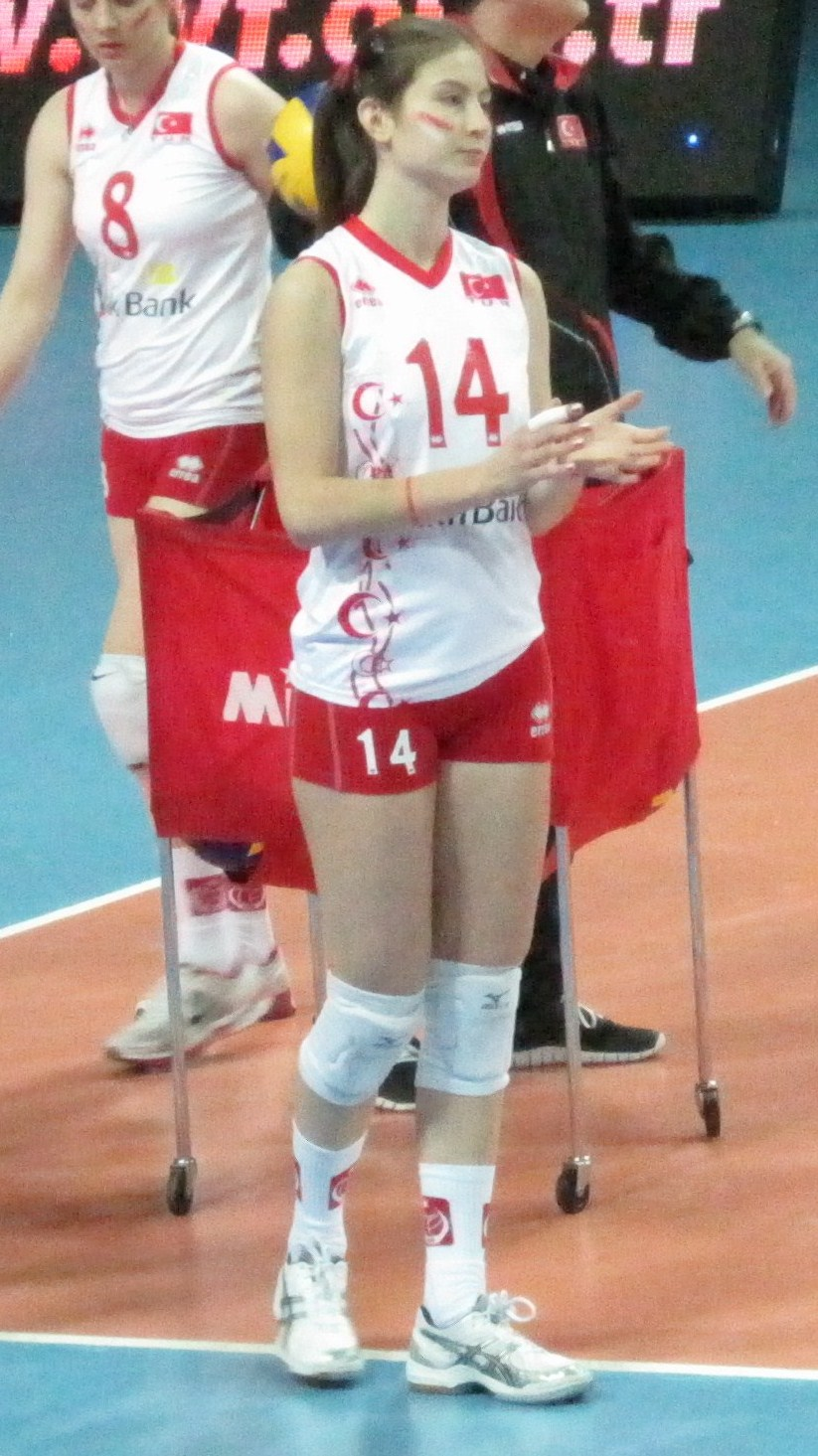

Personal information
- Born: January 1, 1994 (age 32); Ankara, Turkey
- Height: 1.81 m (5 ft 11 1/2 in)
- Weight: 66 kg (146 lb)
- Spike: 292 cm (115 in)
- Block: 278 cm (109 in)

Volleyball information
- Position: Wing spiker
- Current club: (Turkey) Aydın Büyükşehir Belediyespor
- Number: 14

Career
Years	Teams
2004-2009; 2009-2011; 2011-2012; 2013-2014; 2014-2015; 2015-2016; 2016-2017; 2017-2018; 2018-	(Turkey) Türk Telekom Ankara (Turkey) TVF Sport High School (Turkey) Galatasaray (Turkey) Çanakkale Belediye (Turkey) Maltepe Yalı Spor (Turkey) Galatasaray (Turkey) Bolu Belediyespor (Turkey) Balıkesir BBSK (Turkey) Aydın Büyükşehir Belediyespor

National team
2011-	Turkey
Honours
Women's volleyball
Representing Turkey women's youth national volleyball team
Women's Junior European Championship
Gold medal – first place	2012 Ankara	Team
Girls Youth World Championship
Gold medal – first place	2011 Ankara	Team
European Youth Summer Olympic Festival
Bronze medal – third place	2011 Trabzon	Team

Ecem Alıcı (born January 1, 1994, in Ankara, Turkey) is a Turkish volleyball player. She is 181 cm (5.94 ft) tall at 66 kg (146 lb) and plays in the wing spiker position. She plays in the Aydın Büyükşehir Belediyespor, which competes in the Turkish Women's Volleyball League. Alıcı is a member of the Turkey women's youth national volleyball team, and wears number 14.

A native of Ankara, she began with volleyball sport in 2004 at Türk Telekom Ankara Sport Club, where she was coached by Mehmet Akın Akyıldız and Güzin Teksoy. During her two-year educating at the TVF Sport High School in her hometown, she played for the high school's team. After graduating from the high school, she enrolled at Yeditepe University in Istanbul to study industrial engineering. Alıcı was transferred in July 2011 by the Istanbul-based Galatasaray Volleyball.

== Clubs ==
- (Turkey) Türk Telekom Ankara (2004-2009)
- (Turkey) TVF Sport High School (2009-2011)
- (Turkey) Galatasaray (2011-2012)
- (Turkey) Çanakkale Belediye (2013-2014)
- (Turkey) Maltepe Yalı Spor (2014-2015)
- (Turkey) Galatasaray (2015-2016)
- (Turkey) Bolu Belediyespor (2016-2017)
- (Turkey) Balıkesir BBSK (2017-2018)
- (Turkey) Aydın Büyükşehir Belediyespor (2018-)

== Awards ==
=== National team ===
- 2011 FIVB Girls Youth World Championship - Gold
- 2011 European Youth Summer Olympic Festival - Bronze
- 2012 Women's Junior European Volleyball Championship - Gold

=== Club ===
- 2011-12 Turkish Cup - Runner-up, with Galatasaray Daikin
- 2011-12 CEV Cup - Runner-up, with Galatasaray Daikin
- 2012 Turkish Volleyball Super Cup - Runner-Up, with Galatasaray Daikin
- 2012-2013 Turkish Women's Volleyball Cup - Bronze Medal with Galatasaray Daikin

== See also ==
- Turkish women in sports
