= Alper Hamurcu =

Turkish volleyball coach (born 1983)

Personal information
- Nationality: Turkish
- Born: 23 November 1983 (age 42); Ankara, Turkey

Volleyball information
- Position: Head coach
- Current club: Aydın Büyükşehir Belediyespor; Turkey

Career
Years
- 2003-2009
- 2009-2013
- 2013-2017
- 2018–2019
- 2019–
- 2017-
Teams
- Karşıyaka S.K.
- Halkbank (men's volleyball)
- Eczacıbaşı VitrA
- Nilüfer Belediyespor
- Aydın Büyükşehir Belediyespor
- Turkey
Honours
Coach for Women's volleyball
Turkey
FIVB Nations League
Silver medal – second place	2018 Nanjing
European Championship
Silver medal – second place	2019 Slovakia-Hungary-Poland-Turkey
Bronze medal – third place	2017 Azerbaijan-Georgia

Alper Hamurcu (born 23 November 1983) is a Turkish volleyball coach. He's been coaching Turkish side Aydın Büyükşehir Belediyespor since 2019 and also assistant coaches the Turkey women's national team.

== Career ==
=== Clubs ===
Club	Seasons	Position
(Turkey) Karşıyaka S.K.	2003-2009	Responsible of Junior Teams
(Turkey) Halkbank (men's volleyball)	2009-2013	Assistant coach
(Turkey) Eczacıbaşı VitrA	2013-2017	Assistant coach
(Turkey) Nilüfer Belediyespor	2018-2019	Head coach
(Turkey) Aydın Büyükşehir Belediyespor	2019-	Head coach

=== National team ===
Nation	Seasons	Position
Turkey women's national team	2017-	Assistant coach

== Achievements ==
=== Club ===
Halkbank

- Gold 2012-13 Turkish Women's Volleyball Cup
- Gold 2012-13 Women's CEV Cup

Eczacıbaşı

- Gold 2014-15 CEV Women's Champions League
- Gold 2014-15 FIVB Volleyball Women's Club World Championship
- Gold 2015-16 FIVB Volleyball Women's Club World Championship

=== National team ===
Turkey

- Bronze 2017 Women's European Volleyball Championship
- Silver 2018 FIVB Volleyball Women's Nations League
- Bronze 2018 Mediterranean Games
- Silver 2019 Women's European Volleyball Championship
