= East Germany women's national under-21 volleyball team =

Women's volleyball team representing East Germany

East Germany U20
- Association: Volleyball Federation Of East Germany
- Confederation: CEV

Uniforms
| Home | Away | Third |

FIVB U21 World Championship
- Appearances: No Appearances

CEV Europe U19 Championship
- Appearances: 11 (First in 1966)
- Best result: (silver) Runners-Up : (1966, 1979, 1986)

The East Germany women's national under-20 volleyball team represents East Germany in international women's volleyball competitions and friendly matches under the age 20 and it was ruled by the East German Volleyball Federation That was a member of The Federation of International Volleyball FIVB and also a part of The European Volleyball Confederation CEV.

== Results ==
=== FIVB U20 World Championship ===
Champions Runners up Third place Fourth place

FIVB U20 World Championship
| Year | Round | Position | Pld | W | L | SW | SL | Squad |
|---|---|---|---|---|---|---|---|---|
| (Brazil) 1977 | Didn't Qualify | | | | | | | |
| (Mexico) 1981 | Didn't Qualify | | | | | | | |
| (Italy) 1985 | Didn't Qualify | | | | | | | |
| (South Korea) 1987 | Didn't Qualify | | | | | | | |
| (Peru) 1989 | Didn't Qualify | | | | | | | |
| (Czechoslovakia) 1991 | Didn't Qualify | | | | | | | |
| Total | 0 Titles | 0/6 | | | | | | — |

=== Europe U19 Championship ===
Champions Runners up Third place Fourth place

Europe U19 Championship
| Year | Round | Position | Pld | W | L | SW | SL | Squad |
|---|---|---|---|---|---|---|---|---|
| (Hungary) 1966 | | Runners-Up | | | | | | |
| (Soviet Union) 1969 | | 5th place | | | | | | |
| (Italy) 1971 | Didn't Qualify | | | | | | | |
| (Netherlands) 1973 | | 9th place | | | | | | |
| (West Germany) 1975 | | Third place | | | | | | |
| (Socialist Federal Republic of Yugoslavia) 1977 | | Third place | | | | | | |
| (Spain) 1979 | | Runners-Up | | | | | | |
| (West Germany) 1982 | | 4th place | | | | | | |
| (France) 1984 | | 5th place | | | | | | |
| (Bulgaria) 1986 | | Runners-Up | | | | | | |
| (Italy) 1988 | | 5th place | | | | | | |
| (Austria) 1990 | | 9th place | | | | | | |
| Total | 0 Titles | 11/12 | | | | | | |
