= Romania women's national under-21 volleyball team =

Romanian sports

Romania U20
- Association: Romanian Volleyball Federation
- Confederation: CEV

Uniforms
| Home | Away | Third |

FIVB U21 World Championship
- Appearances: 2 (First in 1991)
- Best result: 13th Place : (1991, 1995)

Europe U19 Championship
- Appearances: 12 (First in 1966)
- Best result: Runners-up : (1971)
- Official website

The Romania women's national under-20 volleyball team represents Romania in international women's volleyball competitions and friendly matches under the age 20 and it is ruled by the Romanian Volleyball Federation That is an affiliate of Federation of International Volleyball FIVB and also a part of European Volleyball Confederation CEV.

== Results ==
=== FIVB U21 World Championship ===
Champions Runners up Third place Fourth place

FIVB U21 World Championship
| Year | Round | Position | Pld | W | L | SW | SL | Squad |
|---|---|---|---|---|---|---|---|---|
| (Brazil) → 1977 | Didn't qualify | | | | | | | |
| (Peru) ← 1989 | Didn't qualify | | | | | | | |
| (Czechoslovakia) 1991 | | 13th place | | | | | | Squad |
| (Brazil) 1993 | Didn't qualify | | | | | | | |
| (Thailand) 1995 | | 13th place | | | | | | Squad |
| (Poland) → 1997 | Didn't qualify | | | | | | | |
| (Belgium) (Netherlands) ← 2021 | Didn't qualify | | | | | | | |
| Total | 0 Titles | 2/21 | | | | | | |

=== Europe Junior Championship ===
Champions Runners up Third place Fourth place

Europe Junior Championship
| Year | Round | Position | Pld | W | L | SW | SL | Squad |
|---|---|---|---|---|---|---|---|---|
| (Hungary) 1966 | | 6th place | | | | | | Squad |
| (Soviet Union) 1969 | | 7th place | | | | | | Squad |
| (Italy) 1971 | | Runners-up | | | | | | Squad |
| (Netherlands) 1973 | | 7th place | | | | | | Squad |
| (West Germany) 1975 | | 9th place | | | | | | Squad |
| (Socialist Federal Republic of Yugoslavia) 1977 | | 10th place | | | | | | Squad |
| (Spain) → 1979 | Didn't qualify | | | | | | | |
| (France) ← 1984 | Didn't qualify | | | | | | | |
| (Bulgaria) 1986 | | 7th place | | | | | | Squad |
| (Italy) 1988 | | Third place | | | | | | Squad |
| (Austria) 1990 | | 5th place | | | | | | Squad |
| (Greece) 1992 | | 5th place | | | | | | Squad |
| (Hungary) 1994 | Didn't qualify | | | | | | | |
| (Turkey) 1996 | | 8th place | | | | | | Squad |
| (Belgium) → 1998 | Didn't qualify | | | | | | | |
| (Bosnia and Herzegovina) (Croatia) ← 2020 | Didn't qualify | | | | | | | |
| (North Macedonia) 2022 | | 10th place | | | | | | Squad |
| Total | 0 title | 12/28 | | | | | | |

== Team ==
=== Current squad ===
The Following players is the Romanian players that Competed in the 2018 Women's U19 Volleyball European Championship

| # | name | position | height | weight | birthday | spike | block |
| | Alupei francesca ioana | middle-blocker | 191 | 70 | 2003 | 293 | 283 |
| | Artin andra maria | outside-spiker | 182 | 63 | 2000 | 291 | 282 |
| | Badea maria valentina | middle-blocker | 189 | 77 | 2001 | 291 | 284 |
| | Bicut roxana | opposite | 180 | 68 | 2001 | 288 | 280 |
| | Budai-ungureanu adelina | outside-spiker | 187 | 73 | 2000 | 307 | 290 |
| | Carutasu alexia ioana | opposite | 179 | 54 | 2003 | 290 | 275 |
| | Catargiu cybill naomi | libero | 167 | 50 | 2000 | 285 | 262 |
| | Coman silvia ioana | outside-spiker | 178 | 70 | 2000 | 287 | 280 |
| | Crisan antonia maria | middle-blocker | 183 | 73 | 2001 | 285 | 283 |
| | Diaconu andreea gabriela | opposite | 187 | 70 | 2000 | 286 | 279 |
| | Ditu carmen ioana | middle-blocker | 183 | 60 | 2001 | 293 | 287 |
| | Dulau maria | outside-spiker | 182 | 63 | 2002 | 285 | 270 |
| | Dumitrescu mara | outside-spiker | 179 | 65 | 2002 | 293 | 280 |
| | Dumitrescu theodora andreea | outside-spiker | 177 | 52 | 2000 | 292 | 277 |
| | Dumitru denisa | middle-blocker | 181 | 65 | 2001 | 292 | 281 |
| | Gorduza alexandra larisa | outside-spiker | 181 | 66 | 2001 | 287 | 278 |
| | Ionescu denisa ioana | middle-blocker | 187 | 60 | 2002 | 298 | 285 |
| | Kosinski irina | libero | 170 | 56 | 2001 | 260 | 258 |
| | Manuc anca ioana | outside-spiker | 179 | 65 | 2000 | 295 | 275 |
| | Marginean carla ioana | libero | 176 | 60 | 2000 | 287 | 272 |
| | Murariu florina isabela | outside-spiker | 180 | 82 | 2002 | 283 | 271 |
| | Murariu karina elena | outside-spiker | 181 | 75 | 2002 | 278 | 266 |
| | Nita andreea cora | setter | 174 | 69 | 2001 | 275 | 268 |
| | Pantiru alexandra | outside-spiker | 185 | 67 | 2000 | 300 | 286 |
| | Pasca aurora bianca | setter | 178 | 66 | 2000 | 295 | 282 |
| | Popa georgiana | libero | 165 | 49 | 2003 | 275 | 258 |
| | Radu ana marisa | setter | 177 | 57 | 2001 | 293 | 278 |
| | Stan alina theodora | setter | 173 | 60 | 2001 | 270 | 260 |
| | Stoian ana valentina | outside-spiker | 181 | 57 | 2000 | 289 | 283 |
| | Tesileanu andra maria | middle-blocker | 185 | 60 | 2002 | 285 | 275 |
| | Varneanu iulia florina | middle-blocker | 182 | 70 | 2001 | 288 | 283 |
| | Veres diana teodora | libero | 171 | 50 | 2001 | 287 | 275 |
| | Zadorojnai didona iuna catalina | opposite | 183 | 61 | 2001 | 286 | 277 |
