= 2024 Women's U21 South American Volleyball Championship =

Tournament details
- Host country: Chile
- City: Osorno
- Dates: 25–29 September 2024
- Teams: 6
- Venue: 1 (in 1 host city)

Final positions
- Champions: Brazil (22nd title)
- Runners-up: Argentina
- Third place: Chile
- Fourth place: Colombia

Tournament awards
- MVP: (Brazil) Rebeca Viana
- Best Setter: (Brazil) Amanda Mutuano
- Best OH: (Chile) Dominga Aylwin (Argentina) Milena Margaria
- Best MB: (Brazil) Luana Kuskowski (Argentina) Micaela Cabrera
- Best OPP: (Argentina) Martina Bednarek
- Best Libero: (Brazil) Sofia Will

Tournament statistics
- Matches played: 11

The 2024 Women's U21 South American Volleyball Championship was the 26th edition of the Women's U21 South American Volleyball Championship, the biennial international youth volleyball tournament organised by the Confederación Sudamericana de Voleibol (CSV) for the women's under-21 national teams of South America. It was held in Osorno, Chile from 25 to 29 September 2024.

Same as previous editions, the tournament acted as the CSV qualifiers for the FIVB Volleyball Women's U21 World Championship. The top three teams qualified for the 2025 FIVB Volleyball Women's U21 World Championship in Indonesia as the CSV representatives.

Brazil were the sixteen-time defending champions and successfully retained their title after winning the twenty second by beating Argentina 3–2 in the final. Chile completed the podium after defeating Colombia 3–0 in the third-place match.

== Host and venue ==
Osorno	Location of the host city in Los Lagos Region
Gimnasio Monumental María Gallardo	Location of the host city in Los Lagos Region
Capacity: 5,500	Location of the host city in Los Lagos Region

Chile was named host country of the tournament on 11 April 2024 by the Confederación Sudamericana de Voleibol. The host city Osorno was confirmed as such during the 76th CSV Annual Congress held on 13 July 2024 in Belo Horizonte, Brazil. This is only the second time that Chile has hosted the tournament, the only previous event being the 1980 Women's Junior South American Championship.

The competition was entirely played at the Gimnasio Monumental María Gallardo.

== Teams ==
Six of the twelve CSV member associations entered the tournament.

Team	App	Previous best performance
Argentina	26th	Runners-up (10 times, most recent 2022)
Bolivia	10th	Fourth place (1976, 1992, 2004)
Brazil (holders)	26th	Champions (21 times, most recent 2022)
Chile (hosts)	16th	Fourth place (1972, 1980, 1982, 2012, 2018)
Colombia	17th	Third place (1984, 2012, 2022)
Peru	26th	Champions (1980, 1982, 1986, 1988)

=== Squads ===
Each national team had to register a squad of a minimum of 12 and a maximum of 14 players players. Players born on or after 1 January 2005 were eligible to compete in the tournament.

== Competition format ==
The competition format depends on the number of participating teams. With 6 teams two groups of three teams were formed, which were played on a single round-robin basis. The group standing procedure was as follows:

1. Number of matches won;
2. Match points;
  - Match won 3–0: 3 match points for the winner, 0 match points for the loser
  - Match won 3–1: 3 match points for the winner, 0 match point for the loser
  - Match won 3–2: 2 match points for the winner, 1 match points for the loser
3. Sets ratio;
4. Points ratio;
5. If the tie continues between two teams: result of the last match between the tied teams;
6. If the tie continues between three or more teams: a new classification would be made taking into consideration only the matches between involved teams.

== Preliminary round ==
All match times are local times, CLST (UTC-3).

=== Group A ===
Pos	Team	Pld	W	L	Pts	SW	SL	SR	SPW	SPL	SPR	Qualification
1	Brazil	2	2	0	6	6	0	MAX	150	90	1.667	Semi-finals
2	Colombia	2	1	1	3	3	3	1.000	122	151	0.808	Semi-finals
3	Peru	2	0	2	0	0	6	0.000	126	157	0.803	Fifth-place match

Source: FIVB
Rules for classification: Tiebreakers

Date	Time		Score		Set 1	Set 2	Set 3	Set 4	Set 5	Total	Report
25 Sep	17:30	Brazil	3–0	Colombia	25–16	25–13	25–11			75–40	P2 Report
26 Sep	18:00	Colombia	3–0	Peru	28–26	27–25	27–25			82–76	P2 Report
27 Sep	18:00	Brazil	3–0	Peru	25–18	25–12	25–20			75–50	P2 Report

=== Group B ===
Pos	Team	Pld	W	L	Pts	SW	SL	SR	SPW	SPL	SPR	Qualification
1	Argentina	2	2	0	6	6	0	MAX	150	101	1.485	Semi-finals
2	Chile (H)	2	1	1	3	3	3	1.000	135	117	1.154	Semi-finals
3	Bolivia	2	0	2	0	0	6	0.000	83	150	0.553	Fifth-place match

Source: FIVB
Rules for classification: Tiebreakers
(H) Host

Date	Time		Score		Set 1	Set 2	Set 3	Set 4	Set 5	Total	Report
25 Sep	20:00	Chile	0–3	Argentina	17–25	20–25	23–25			60–75	P2 Report
26 Sep	20:00	Bolivia	0–3	Argentina	11–25	14–25	16–25			41–75	P2 Report
27 Sep	20:00	Chile	3–0	Bolivia	25–11	25–13	25–18			75–42	P2 Report

== Final round ==
=== Bracket ===
Semi-finals
28 September
Argentina	3
Colombia	0
28 September
Chile	0
Brazil	3

Final
29 September
Argentina	2
Brazil	3

Fifth-place match
29 September
Peru	3
Bolivia	0

Third-place match
29 September
Chile	3
Colombia	0

=== Semi-finals ===
Date	Time		Score		Set 1	Set 2	Set 3	Set 4	Set 5	Total	Report
28 Sep	18:00	Chile	0–3	Brazil	10–25	10–25	21–25			41–75	P2 Report
28 Sep	20:00	Argentina	3–0	Colombia	25–10	25–13	25–11			75–34	P2 Report

=== 5th place match ===
Date	Time		Score		Set 1	Set 2	Set 3	Set 4	Set 5	Total	Report
28 Sep	16:00	Peru	3–0	Bolivia	25–19	25–16	25–13			75–48	P2 Report

=== 3rd place match ===
Date	Time		Score		Set 1	Set 2	Set 3	Set 4	Set 5	Total	Report
29 Sep	11:00	Chile	3–0	Colombia	25–15	25–19	25–18			75–52	P2 Report

=== Final ===
Date	Time		Score		Set 1	Set 2	Set 3	Set 4	Set 5	Total	Report
29 Sep	13:00	Argentina	2–3	Brazil	10–25	26–24	25–19	21–25	8–15	90–108	P2 Report

== Final standing ==
Qualified for 2025 FIVB Women's U21 World Championship.

Rank	Team
1st place, gold medalist(s)	Brazil
2nd place, silver medalist(s)	Argentina
3rd place, bronze medalist(s)	Chile
4	Colombia
5	Peru
6	Bolivia

2024 Women's U21 South American Championship champions

Brazil
Twenty-second title

Team Roster:

Maila Ribeiro (L), Ana Luiza Berto, Laura Perugini, Lara Nascimento, Rebeca Viana, Aline Segato (C), Isabella Nunes, Bianca Coimbra, Amanda Mutuano, Vittoria Kuehn, Ana Lídia Scopinho, Sofia Will (L), Luana Kuskowski, Juliana Palhano.

Head coach: (Brazil) Wagão

== Individual awards ==
The following individual awards were presented at the end of the tournament.

- Most valuable player (MVP)

Rebeca Viana (BRA)

- Best middle blockers

Luana Kuskowski (BRA)
Micaela Cabrera (ARG)

- Best setter

Amanda Mutuano (BRA)

- Best opposite spiker

Martina Bednarek (ARG)

- Best outside spikers

Dominga Aylwin (CHI)
Milena Margaria (ARG)

- Best libero

Sofia Will (BRA)

== See also ==
- 2024 Men's U21 South American Volleyball Championship
