= Czechoslovakia women's national under-21 volleyball team =

Czechoslovak women's volleyball team

Czechoslovakia U20
- Association: Volleyball Federation Of Czechoslovakia
- Confederation: CEV

Uniforms
Home	Away	Third

FIVB U21 World Championship
- Appearances: 2 (First in 1985)
- Best result: 6th place : (1991)

CEV Europe U19 Championship
- Appearances: 12 (First in 1966)
- Best result: (silver) Runners-Up : (1973, 1975, 1977, 1992)
- www.cvf.cz (in Czech)

The Czechoslovakia women's national under-20 volleyball team represents Czechoslovakia in international women's volleyball competitions and friendly matches under the age 20 and it was ruled by the Czechoslovak Volleyball Federation That was a member of The Federation of International Volleyball FIVB and also a part of The European Volleyball Confederation CEV.

== Results ==
=== FIVB U20 World Championship ===
Champions Runners up Third place Fourth place

FIVB U20 World Championship
Year	Round	Position	Pld	W	L	SW	SL	Squad
(Brazil) 1977	Didn't Qualify							
(Mexico) 1981	Didn't Qualify							
(Italy) 1985		10th place						
(South Korea) 1987	Didn't Qualify							
(Peru) 1989	Didn't Qualify							
(Czechoslovakia) 1991		6th place						
Total	0 Titles	2/6						—

=== Europe U19 Championship ===
Champions Runners up Third place Fourth place

Europe U19 Championship
Year	Round	Position	Pld	W	L	SW	SL	Squad
(Hungary) 1966		Third place						
(Soviet Union) 1969		4th place						
(Italy) 1971		5th place						
(Netherlands) 1973		Runners-Up						
(West Germany) 1975		Runners-Up						
(Socialist Federal Republic of Yugoslavia) 1977		Runners-Up						
(Spain) 1979		Third place						
(West Germany) 1982		Third place						
(France) 1984		Third place						
(Bulgaria) 1986		4th place						
(Italy) 1988		7th place						
(Austria) 1990		Third place						
(Greece) 1992		Runners-Up						
Total	0 Titles	13/13						
