= 2019 FIVB Volleyball Women's U20 World Championship squads =

This article shows the rosters of all participating teams at the 2019 FIVB Volleyball Women's U20 World Championship in Mexico.

== Argentina ==
The following is the Argentinian roster in the 2019 FIVB Volleyball Women's U20 World Championship.

Head coach: Guillermo Caceres

| No. | Name | Date of birth | Height | Weight | Spike | Block | 2019 club |
|---|---|---|---|---|---|---|---|
| 2 | Victoria Mayer (C) | 19 June 2001 | 1.80 m (5 ft 11 in) | 59 kg (130 lb) | 285 cm (112 in) | 265 cm (104 in) | Regatas - Santa Fe |
| 3 | Aylen Ayub | 18 June 2002 | 1.81 m (5 ft 11 in) | 63 kg (139 lb) | 290 cm (110 in) | 273 cm (107 in) | GER - Rosario |
| 4 | Maria Tiziana Puljiz | 13 February 2002 | 1.80 m (5 ft 11 in) | 68 kg (150 lb) | 290 cm (110 in) | 270 cm (110 in) | Regatas Resistencia |
| 5 | Candela Sol Salinas | 23 May 2000 | 1.83 m (6 ft 0 in) | 64 kg (141 lb) | 278 cm (109 in) | 265 cm (104 in) | Boca Juniors |
| 7 | Angeles Ligorria | 24 January 2000 | 1.80 m (5 ft 11 in) | 68 kg (150 lb) | 290 cm (110 in) | 270 cm (110 in) | Atenas - Cordoba |
| 8 | Martina Delucchi | 13 October 2000 | 1.79 m (5 ft 10 in) | 74 kg (163 lb) | 293 cm (115 in) | 273 cm (107 in) | Estudiantes - La Plata |
| 10 | Sofia Meinardi | 22 November 2001 | 1.75 m (5 ft 9 in) | 70 kg (150 lb) | 287 cm (113 in) | 270 cm (110 in) | Central San Carlos |
| 11 | Bianca Farriol | 18 December 2001 | 1.80 m (5 ft 11 in) | 68 kg (150 lb) | 290 cm (110 in) | 270 cm (110 in) | Universidad La Matanza |
| 12 | Martina Castro | 18 December 2000 | 1.74 m (5 ft 9 in) | 63 kg (139 lb) | 290 cm (110 in) | 270 cm (110 in) | Boca Juniors |
| 13 | Bianca Cugno | 22 April 2003 | 1.91 m (6 ft 3 in) | 72 kg (159 lb) | 290 cm (110 in) | 270 cm (110 in) | S.S. Devoto |
| 14 | Melisa Gabriela Corzo | 5 January 2000 | 1.80 m (5 ft 11 in) | 64 kg (141 lb) | 283 cm (111 in) | 274 cm (108 in) | 9 DE JULIO - FREYRE |
| 18 | Berenice Almeyda | 7 May 2001 | 1.80 m (5 ft 11 in) | 68 kg (150 lb) | 290 cm (110 in) | 270 cm (110 in) | GELP |

== Brazil ==
The following is the Brazilian roster in the 2019 FIVB Volleyball Women's U20 World Championship.

Head coach: Cabral de Oliveira

| No. | Name | Date of birth | Height | Weight | Spike | Block | 2019 club |
|---|---|---|---|---|---|---|---|
| 1 | Rosely Nogueira | 6 March 2001 | 1.75 m (5 ft 9 in) | 67 kg (148 lb) | 270 cm (110 in) | 265 cm (104 in) | (Brazil) Varginha |
| 3 | Laura Kudiess | 25 February 2001 | 1.88 m (6 ft 2 in) | 72 kg (159 lb) | 300 cm (120 in) | 286 cm (113 in) | (Brazil) Minas Tênis Clube |
| 4 | Julia Kudiess | 2 January 2003 | 1.89 m (6 ft 2 in) | 76 kg (168 lb) | 301 cm (119 in) | 287 cm (113 in) | (Brazil) Minas Tênis Clube |
| 6 | Julia Bergmann | 21 February 2001 | 1.96 m (6 ft 5 in) | 78 kg (172 lb) | 301 cm (119 in) | 289 cm (114 in) | (Brazil) Abel Brusque |
| 7 | Daniela Seibt | 17 April 2000 | 1.90 m (6 ft 3 in) | 74 kg (163 lb) | 295 cm (116 in) | 290 cm (110 in) | (Brazil) A.D. Guaraciaba |
| 8 | Jheovana Sebastião | 10 January 2001 | 1.94 m (6 ft 4 in) | 90 kg (200 lb) | 300 cm (120 in) | 290 cm (110 in) | (Brazil) Hinode Barueri |
| 9 | Kisy Nascimento | 28 January 2000 | 1.90 m (6 ft 3 in) | 81 kg (179 lb) | 303 cm (119 in) | 290 cm (110 in) | (Brazil) A.A. São Caetano |
| 10 | Tainara Santos (C) | 9 March 2000 | 1.90 m (6 ft 3 in) | 81 kg (179 lb) | 306 cm (120 in) | 289 cm (114 in) | (Brazil) Hinode Barueri |
| 11 | Mayara Silva | 26 April 2001 | 1.82 m (6 ft 0 in) | 74 kg (163 lb) | 293 cm (115 in) | 284 cm (112 in) | (Brazil) Fluminense FC |
| 13 | Kenya Malachias | 29 November 2000 | 1.85 m (6 ft 1 in) | 73 kg (161 lb) | 294 cm (116 in) | 280 cm (110 in) | (Brazil) Bradesco |
| 18 | Ana Cristina de Souza | 7 April 2004 | 1.92 m (6 ft 4 in) | 79 kg (174 lb) | 309 cm (122 in) | 296 cm (117 in) | (Brazil) E.C. Pinheiros |
| 20 | Letícia Moura | 8 May 2003 | 1.59 m (5 ft 3 in) | 54 kg (119 lb) | 272 cm (107 in) | 252 cm (99 in) | (Brazil) Fluminense FC |

== China ==
The following is the Chinese roster in the 2019 FIVB Volleyball Women's U20 World Championship.

Head coach: Hairong Shi

| No. | Name | Date of birth | Height | Weight | Spike | Block | 2019 club |
|---|---|---|---|---|---|---|---|
| 1 | Luyao Xu | 18 August 2000 | 1.92 m (6 ft 4 in) | 90 kg (200 lb) | 305 cm (120 in) | 295 cm (116 in) | (China) Jiangsu |
| 2 | Wenhan Che | 11 April 2000 | 1.93 m (6 ft 4 in) | 67 kg (148 lb) | 305 cm (120 in) | 297 cm (117 in) | (China) Shandong |
| 3 | Yiwen Miao | 26 July 2000 | 1.86 m (6 ft 1 in) | 71 kg (157 lb) | 306 cm (120 in) | 295 cm (116 in) | (China) Sichuan |
| 4 | Junyi Mao | 8 January 2000 | 1.9 m (6 ft 3 in) | 81 kg (179 lb) | 312 cm (123 in) | 302 cm (119 in) | (China) Henan |
| 5 | Dian Jiao | 8 September 2000 | 1.93 m (6 ft 4 in) | 72 kg (159 lb) | 297 cm (117 in) | 291 cm (115 in) | (China) Bayi |
| 6 | Yan Sun (c) | 6 July 2001 | 1.88 m (6 ft 2 in) | 68 kg (150 lb) | 308 cm (121 in) | 295 cm (116 in) | (China) Jiangsu |
| 7 | Yuqing Sun | 18 February 2001 | 1.87 m (6 ft 2 in) | 63 kg (139 lb) | 320 cm (130 in) | 310 cm (120 in) | (China) Liaoning |
| 10 | Yizhu Wang | 23 March 2001 | 1.89 m (6 ft 2 in) | 75 kg (165 lb) | 318 cm (125 in) | 305 cm (120 in) | (China) Tianjin |
| 11 | Xiaoxuan Sun | 18 February 2000 | 1.86 m (6 ft 1 in) | 77 kg (170 lb) | 308 cm (121 in) | 300 cm (120 in) | (China) Liaoning |
| 12 | Fanglin Chen | 2 September 2000 | 1.8 m (5 ft 11 in) | 67 kg (148 lb) | 310 cm (120 in) | 300 cm (120 in) | (China) Shanghai |
| 13 | Feifan Ni | 14 February 2001 | 1.75 m (5 ft 9 in) | 67 kg (148 lb) | 271 cm (107 in) | 265 cm (104 in) | (China) Jiangsu |
| 14 | Ruilan Chen | 23 November 2001 | 1.75 m (5 ft 9 in) | 63 kg (139 lb) | 301 cm (119 in) | 288 cm (113 in) | (China) Shanghai |

== Cuba ==
The following is the Cuban roster in the 2019 FIVB Volleyball Women's U20 World Championship.

Head coach: Tomas Fernandez Arteaga

| No. | Name | Date of birth | Height | Weight | Spike | Block | 2019 club |
|---|---|---|---|---|---|---|---|
| 2 | Dezirett De La Caridad Madan Rosales | 10 December 2002 | 1.83 m (6 ft 0 in) | 71 kg (157 lb) | 289 cm (114 in) | 275 cm (108 in) | (Cuba) La Habana |
| 5 | Dayana Martinez Hernandez | 19 October 2002 | 1.89 m (6 ft 2 in) | 74 kg (163 lb) | 285 cm (112 in) | 280 cm (110 in) | (Cuba) Cienfuegos |
| 6 | Ellemay Santa Miranda Tejeda | 7 May 2002 | 1.65 m (5 ft 5 in) | 60 kg (130 lb) | 278 cm (109 in) | 276 cm (109 in) | (Cuba) LA HABANA |
| 9 | Yaimaris De Los Angeles Garcia Victoria | 3 December 2002 | 1.83 m (6 ft 0 in) | 73 kg (161 lb) | 265 cm (104 in) | 258 cm (102 in) | (Cuba) Camaguey |
| 11 | Claudia Basilia Tarin Alarcon | 26 January 2003 | 1.89 m (6 ft 2 in) | 76 kg (168 lb) | 315 cm (124 in) | 308 cm (121 in) | (Cuba) Las Tunas |
| 12 | Ailama Cese Montalvo | 29 October 2000 | 1.88 m (6 ft 2 in) | 58 kg (128 lb) | 322 cm (127 in) | 308 cm (121 in) | (Cuba) Mayabeque |
| 13 | Yamisleydis Viltres Pacheco | 26 July 2001 | 1.89 m (6 ft 2 in) | 73 kg (161 lb) | 247 cm (97 in) | 244 cm (96 in) | (Cuba) Granma |
| 15 | Amelia Morozo Moises | 7 February 2002 | 1.86 m (6 ft 1 in) | 67 kg (148 lb) | 246 cm (97 in) | 244 cm (96 in) | (Cuba) Camaguey |
| 16 | Thainalien Castillo Leyva | 17 March 2003 | 1.79 m (5 ft 10 in) | 67 kg (148 lb) | 230 cm (91 in) | 227 cm (89 in) | (Cuba) Granma |
| 23 | Daima Del Rió Preval | 9 September 2000 | 1.8 m (5 ft 11 in) | 77 kg (170 lb) | 236 cm (93 in) | 234 cm (92 in) | (Cuba) LA HABANA |
| 24 | Thalia Moreno Reyes (c) | 10 April 2002 | 1.89 m (6 ft 2 in) | 76 kg (168 lb) | 315 cm (124 in) | 308 cm (121 in) | (Cuba) Villa Clara |
| 25 | Ivy May Vila Wittingham | 22 July 2001 | 1.81 m (5 ft 11 in) | 78 kg (172 lb) | 235 cm (93 in) | 232 cm (91 in) | (Cuba) Camaguey |

== Dominican Republic ==
The following is the Dominican roster in the 2019 FIVB Volleyball Women's U20 World Championship.

Head coach: Wagner Pacheco

| No. | Name | Date of birth | Height | Weight | Spike | Block | 2019 club |
|---|---|---|---|---|---|---|---|
| 1 | Flormarie Heredia | 21 October 2002 | 1.81 m (5 ft 11 in) | 80 kg (180 lb) | 284 cm (112 in) | 280 cm (110 in) | (Dominican Republic) Mirador |
| 5 | Sarah Cruz | 11 December 2002 | 1.76 m (5 ft 9 in) | 55 kg (121 lb) | 288 cm (113 in) | 271 cm (107 in) | (Dominican Republic) Ricardo Arias |
| 6 | Camila de La Rosa | 2 July 2001 | 1.78 m (5 ft 10 in) | 73 kg (161 lb) | 273 cm (107 in) | 260 cm (100 in) | (Dominican Republic) Deportivo Nacional |
| 7 | Madeline Guillen | 4 June 2001 | 1.86 m (6 ft 1 in) | 74 kg (163 lb) | 273 cm (107 in) | 242 cm (95 in) | (Dominican Republic) Malanga |
| 8 | Natalia Martínez (C) | 25 November 2000 | 1.86 m (6 ft 1 in) | 71 kg (157 lb) | 310 cm (120 in) | 300 cm (120 in) | (Dominican Republic) Mirador |
| 11 | Geraldine González | 18 April 2002 | 1.96 m (6 ft 5 in) | 77 kg (170 lb) | 295 cm (116 in) | 290 cm (110 in) | (Dominican Republic) Deportivo Nacional |
| 12 | Hennesys Lalane | 10 April 2000 | 1.85 m (6 ft 1 in) | 74 kg (163 lb) | 275 cm (108 in) | 263 cm (104 in) | (Dominican Republic) Deportivo Nacional |
| 13 | Raquel Rodriguez | 12 July 2000 | 1.83 m (6 ft 0 in) | 60 kg (130 lb) | 284 cm (112 in) | 268 cm (106 in) | (Dominican Republic) Deportivo Nacional |
| 15 | Miriela Jimenez | 10 May 2001 | 1.94 m (6 ft 4 in) | 86 kg (190 lb) | 285 cm (112 in) | 277 cm (109 in) | (Dominican Republic) Deportivo Nacional |
| 19 | Mesalina Severino | 18 July 2000 | 1.85 m (6 ft 1 in) | 63 kg (139 lb) | 283 cm (111 in) | 272 cm (107 in) | (Dominican Republic) Deportivo Nacional |
| 22 | Yaneirys Rodriguez | 26 June 2000 | 1.71 m (5 ft 7 in) | 56 kg (123 lb) | 280 cm (110 in) | 251 cm (99 in) | (Dominican Republic) Bonao |
| 23 | Esthefany Rabit | 18 January 2002 | 1.86 m (6 ft 1 in) | 82 kg (181 lb) | 290 cm (110 in) | 280 cm (110 in) | (Dominican Republic) San Pedro |

== Egypt ==
The following is the Egyptian roster in the 2019 FIVB Volleyball Women's U20 World Championship.

Head coach: Ahmed Mohamed

| No. | Name | Date of birth | Height | Weight | Spike | Block | 2019 club |
|---|---|---|---|---|---|---|---|
| 1 | Hana Mansy | 24 October 2001 | 1.81 m (5 ft 11 in) | 88 kg (194 lb) | 278 cm (109 in) | 273 cm (107 in) | (Egypt) El Khahira Club |
| 6 | Mayar Mohamed | 5 February 2000 | 1.86 m (6 ft 1 in) | 78 kg (172 lb) | 279 cm (110 in) | 273 cm (107 in) | (Egypt) Al Ahly SC |
| 7 | Hadeer Ewais | 22 February 2000 | 1.78 m (5 ft 10 in) | 75 kg (165 lb) | 280 cm (110 in) | 275 cm (108 in) | (Egypt) Al Ahly SC |
| 8 | Aliaa Helal | 1 January 2000 | 1.81 m (5 ft 11 in) | 71 kg (157 lb) | 279 cm (110 in) | 270 cm (110 in) | (Egypt) El Shams Club |
| 9 | Nada Essa | 21 January 2000 | 1.65 m (5 ft 5 in) | 69 kg (152 lb) | 250 cm (98 in) | 240 cm (94 in) | (Egypt) Al Ahly SC |
| 10 | Zeina Elelemy | 1 January 2000 | 1.8 m (5 ft 11 in) | 70 kg (150 lb) | 285 cm (112 in) | 275 cm (108 in) | (Egypt) Shooting Club |
| 12 | Hana Abass | 23 July 2000 | 1.7 m (5 ft 7 in) | 64 kg (141 lb) | 263 cm (104 in) | 251 cm (99 in) | (Egypt) Al Ahly SC |
| 13 | Nourallah Amin (c) | 25 November 2000 | 1.84 m (6 ft 0 in) | 70 kg (150 lb) | 285 cm (112 in) | 276 cm (109 in) | (Egypt) Al Ahly SC |
| 15 | Hana Elmasry | 20 July 2001 | 1.73 m (5 ft 8 in) | 64 kg (141 lb) | 276 cm (109 in) | 267 cm (105 in) | (Egypt) El Shams Club |
| 18 | Dana Emam | 4 October 2000 | 1.81 m (5 ft 11 in) | 73 kg (161 lb) | 280 cm (110 in) | 271 cm (107 in) | (Egypt) Al Ahly SC |
| 19 | Sohila Sayid | 26 August 2000 | 1.74 m (5 ft 9 in) | 78 kg (172 lb) | 275 cm (108 in) | 262 cm (103 in) | (Egypt) Al Ahly SC |
| 20 | Dalia Morshedy | 15 November 2001 | 1.82 m (6 ft 0 in) | 80 kg (180 lb) | 280 cm (110 in) | 268 cm (106 in) | (Egypt) Shooting Club |

== Italy ==
The following is the Italian roster in the 2019 FIVB Volleyball Women's U20 World Championship.

Head coach: Massimo Bellano

| No. | Name | Date of birth | Height | Weight | Spike | Block | 2019 club |
|---|---|---|---|---|---|---|---|
| 1 | Terry Enweonwu | 12 May 2000 | 1.87 m (6 ft 2 in) | 86 kg (190 lb) | 339 cm (133 in) | 309 cm (122 in) | (Italy) Club Italia |
| 2 | Valeria Battista | 23 January 2001 | 1.84 m (6 ft 0 in) | 64 kg (141 lb) | 316 cm (124 in) | 300 cm (120 in) | (Italy) Foppapedretti Bergamo |
| 4 | Federica Squarcini | 24 September 2000 | 1.85 m (6 ft 1 in) | 70 kg (150 lb) | 320 cm (130 in) | 320 cm (130 in) | (Italy) Volley Sassuolo |
| 5 | Marina Lubian | 11 April 2000 | 1.95 m (6 ft 5 in) | 73 kg (161 lb) | 318 cm (125 in) | 300 cm (120 in) | (Italy) Club Italia |
| 9 | Fatime Kone | 25 October 2000 | 1.84 m (6 ft 0 in) | 73 kg (161 lb) | 310 cm (120 in) | 298 cm (117 in) | (Italy) Lilliput Settimo T.se |
| 10 | Adhuoljok Malual | 14 November 2000 | 1.88 m (6 ft 2 in) | 72 kg (159 lb) | 322 cm (127 in) | 305 cm (120 in) | (Italy) Club Italia |
| 13 | Alessia Populini (C) | 10 September 2000 | 1.81 m (5 ft 11 in) | 65 kg (143 lb) | 304 cm (120 in) | 296 cm (117 in) | (Italy) Club Italia |
| 14 | Sara Panetoni | 6 May 2000 | 1.75 m (5 ft 9 in) | 59 kg (130 lb) | 294 cm (116 in) | 288 cm (113 in) | (Italy) Club Italia |
| 15 | Oghosasere Omoruyi | 25 August 2002 | 1.84 m (6 ft 0 in) | 75 kg (165 lb) | 292 cm (115 in) | 242 cm (95 in) | (Italy) Club Italia |
| 16 | Francesca Scola | 15 September 2001 | 1.76 m (5 ft 9 in) | 70 kg (150 lb) | 292 cm (115 in) | 286 cm (113 in) | (Italy) Club Italia |
| 17 | Alice Tanase | 25 May 2000 | 1.78 m (5 ft 10 in) | 71 kg (157 lb) | 302 cm (119 in) | 296 cm (117 in) | (Italy) Volleyrò Roma |
| 18 | Rachele Morello | 7 November 2000 | 1.82 m (6 ft 0 in) | 77 kg (170 lb) | 302 cm (119 in) | 296 cm (117 in) | (Italy) Club Italia |

== Japan ==
The following is the Japanese roster for the 2019 FIVB Volleyball Women's U20 World Championship.

Head coach: Noboru Aihara

| No. | Name | Pos. | Date of birth | Height | Weight | Spike | 2019 club |
|---|---|---|---|---|---|---|---|
| 1 | Miyu Nakagawa | OP/OH | 8 January 2000 | 1.83 m (6 ft 0 in) | 65 kg (143 lb) | 311 cm (122 in) | (Japan) Hisamitsu Springs |
| 2 | Nichika Yamada | MB | 24 February 2000 | 1.84 m (6 ft 0 in) | 73 kg (161 lb) | 301 cm (119 in) | (Japan) NEC Red Rockets |
| 3 | Mayu Ishikawa | OH | 14 May 2000 | 1.71 m (5 ft 7 in) | 68 kg (150 lb) | 300 cm (120 in) | (Japan) Toray Arrows |
| 4 | Shion Hirayama | MB | 7 November 2000 | 1.80 m (5 ft 11 in) | 68 kg (150 lb) | 295 cm (116 in) | (Japan) Hisamitsu Springs |
| 5 | Yuki Nishikawa | OH | 4 September 2000 | 1.83 m (6 ft 0 in) | 65 kg (143 lb) | 300 cm (120 in) | (Japan) JT Marvelous |
| 6 | Haruna Soga | OP | 25 March 2001 | 1.73 m (5 ft 8 in) | 65 kg (143 lb) | 306 cm (120 in) | (Japan) NEC Red Rockets |
| 7 | Ameze Miyabe | OH | 12 October 2001 | 1.72 m (5 ft 8 in) | 54 kg (119 lb) | 300 cm (120 in) | (Japan) Kinrankai High School |
| 8 | Ayaka Araki | MB | 2 September 2001 | 1.84 m (6 ft 0 in) | 76 kg (168 lb) | 295 cm (116 in) | (Japan) Higashi Kyushu Ryukoku |
| 9 | Minami Nishimura | OH/L | 23 March 2000 | 1.68 m (5 ft 6 in) | 61 kg (134 lb) | 284 cm (112 in) | (Japan) Okayama Seagulls |
| 10 | Rena Mizusugi | L | 6 April 2000 | 1.65 m (5 ft 5 in) | 50 kg (110 lb) | 265 cm (104 in) | (Japan) Toray Arrows |
| 11 | Kanon Sonoda | S | 4 September 2000 | 1.58 m (5 ft 2 in) | 55 kg (121 lb) | 286 cm (113 in) | (Japan) PFU BlueCats |
| 12 | Tsukasa Nakagawa | S | 13 August 2000 | 1.59 m (5 ft 3 in) | 60 kg (130 lb) | 283 cm (111 in) | (Japan) Tokai University |

== Mexico ==
The following is the Mexican roster for the 2019 FIVB Volleyball Women's U20 World Championship.

Head coach: Luis Leon

| No. | Name | Pos. | Date of birth | Height | Weight | Spike | 2019 club |
|---|---|---|---|---|---|---|---|
| 1 | Uxue Amaya Guereca Parra (c) | 12 February 2001 | 1.76 m (5 ft 9 in) | 64 kg (141 lb) | 270 cm (110 in) | 259 cm (102 in) | (Mexico) JALISCO |
| 3 | Sofia Maldonado Diaz | 6 February 2002 | 1.78 m (5 ft 10 in) | 58 kg (128 lb) | 275 cm (108 in) | 260 cm (100 in) | (Mexico) JALISCO |
| 4 | Natalie Nizeth Nava Minjarez | 19 October 2000 | 1.8 m (5 ft 11 in) | 76 kg (168 lb) | 295 cm (116 in) | 288 cm (113 in) | (Mexico) BAJA CALIFORNIA |
| 5 | Renata López Morales | 15 February 2001 | 1.85 m (6 ft 1 in) | 74 kg (163 lb) | 291 cm (115 in) | 283 cm (111 in) | (Mexico) JALISCO |
| 7 | Gloria Argentina Ung Enriquez | 25 April 2002 | 1.81 m (5 ft 11 in) | 59 kg (130 lb) | 290 cm (110 in) | 270 cm (110 in) | (Mexico) SONORA |
| 8 | Marian Aylin Ovalle Leyva | 14 September 2002 | 1.78 m (5 ft 10 in) | 66 kg (146 lb) | 278 cm (109 in) | 260 cm (100 in) | (Mexico) Chihuahua |
| 9 | María Celeste Vela Jimenez | 19 May 2000 | 1.75 m (5 ft 9 in) | 64 kg (141 lb) | 250 cm (98 in) | 239 cm (94 in) | (Mexico) JALISCO |
| 10 | Daniela Siller Flores | 25 March 2000 | 1.75 m (5 ft 9 in) | 58 kg (128 lb) | 258 cm (102 in) | 249 cm (98 in) | (Mexico) NUEVO LEON |
| 12 | Joseline Landeros Palacios | 20 December 2000 | 1.69 m (5 ft 7 in) | 60 kg (130 lb) | 265 cm (104 in) | 249 cm (98 in) | (Mexico) NUEVO LEON |
| 13 | Mirna Yajaira Valenzuela Castro | 13 June 2000 | 1.75 m (5 ft 9 in) | 68 kg (150 lb) | 264 cm (104 in) | 240 cm (94 in) | (Mexico) BAJA CALIFORNIA |
| 14 | Grecia Esther Castro López | 5 March 2001 | 1.8 m (5 ft 11 in) | 75 kg (165 lb) | 255 cm (100 in) | 241 cm (95 in) | (Mexico) BAJA CALIFORNIA |
| 16 | Melanie Guadalupe Parra Quintero | 12 September 2002 | 1.76 m (5 ft 9 in) | 50 kg (110 lb) | 249 cm (98 in) | 242 cm (95 in) | (Mexico) SINALOA |

== Peru ==
The following is the Peruvian roster for the 2019 FIVB Volleyball Women's U20 World Championship.

Head coach: Natalia Málaga Dibos

| No. | Name | Pos. | Date of birth | Height | Weight | Spike | 2019 club |
|---|---|---|---|---|---|---|---|
| 1 | Yadhira Anchante | 19 November 2002 | 1.78 m (5 ft 10 in) | 59 kg (130 lb) | 286 cm (113 in) | 290 cm (110 in) | (Peru) Túpac Amaru |
| 2 | Carolina Takahashi Omote | 18 September 2002 | 1.77 m (5 ft 10 in) | 68 kg (150 lb) | 281 cm (111 in) | 270 cm (110 in) | |
| 3 | Claudia Palza | 4 July 2001 | 1.83 m (6 ft 0 in) | 71 kg (157 lb) | 288 cm (113 in) | 280 cm (110 in) | (Peru) Club Deportivo Geminis |
| 4 | Ariana Arciniega (c) | 14 September 2000 | 1.79 m (5 ft 10 in) | 75 kg (165 lb) | 280 cm (110 in) | 285 cm (112 in) | (Peru) Circolo Sportivo Italiano |
| 5 | Aixa Vigil | 23 September 2001 | 1.8 m (5 ft 11 in) | 65 kg (143 lb) | 284 cm (112 in) | 295 cm (116 in) | (Peru) Univ. Cesar Vallejo |
| 6 | Janelly Sarita Ceopa Dongo | 30 March 2002 | 1.75 m (5 ft 9 in) | 65 kg (143 lb) | 285 cm (112 in) | 270 cm (110 in) | (Peru) Tupac Amaru |
| 7 | Flavia Montes | 22 November 2000 | 1.87 m (6 ft 2 in) | 60 kg (130 lb) | 295 cm (116 in) | 290 cm (110 in) | (Peru) Univ. San Martin De Porres |
| 8 | Giulia Montalbetti | 17 May 2001 | 1.82 m (6 ft 0 in) | 82 kg (181 lb) | 290 cm (110 in) | 276 cm (109 in) | (Peru) REGATAS LIMA |
| 9 | Camila Nicolle Perez Rivas | 2 September 2002 | 1.8 m (5 ft 11 in) | 60 kg (130 lb) | 291 cm (115 in) | 275 cm (108 in) | |
| 11 | Kiara Montes | 13 January 2001 | 1.76 m (5 ft 9 in) | 68 kg (150 lb) | 282 cm (111 in) | 293 cm (115 in) | (Peru) Sporting Cristal |
| 13 | Andrea Francesca Calderon Rios | 2 October 2002 | 1.64 m (5 ft 5 in) | 60 kg (130 lb) | 265 cm (104 in) | 250 cm (98 in) | (Peru) Sporting Cristal |
| 14 | Yohmara Rivera Guerrero | 19 March 2002 | 1.78 m (5 ft 10 in) | 75 kg (165 lb) | 285 cm (112 in) | 270 cm (110 in) | (Peru) Deportivo Alianza |

== Poland ==
The following is the Polish roster for the 2019 FIVB Volleyball Women's U20 World Championship.

Head coach: Waldemar Kawka

| No. | Name | Pos. | Date of birth | Height | Weight | Spike | 2019 club |
|---|---|---|---|---|---|---|---|
| 2 | Monika Jagła | 4 January 2000 | 1.77 m (5 ft 10 in) | 69 kg (152 lb) | 298 cm (117 in) | 285 cm (112 in) | (Poland) KS Pałac Bydgoszcz |
| 5 | Weronika Centka | 6 September 2000 | 1.91 m (6 ft 3 in) | 63 kg (139 lb) | 312 cm (123 in) | 297 cm (117 in) | (Poland) Grot Budowlani Łódź |
| 8 | Zuzanna Gorecka | 10 April 2000 | 1.81 m (5 ft 11 in) | 63 kg (139 lb) | 301 cm (119 in) | 284 cm (112 in) | (Poland) LTS Legionovia Legionowo |
| 9 | Paulina Damaske | 1 June 2001 | 1.78 m (5 ft 10 in) | 64 kg (141 lb) | 304 cm (120 in) | 292 cm (115 in) | (Poland) SPS Volley Piła |
| 10 | Adrianna Rybak | 29 September 2000 | 1.88 m (6 ft 2 in) | 72 kg (159 lb) | 300 cm (120 in) | 287 cm (113 in) | (Poland) GEDANIA S.A. Gdansk |
| 12 | Oliwia Baluk (c) | 17 May 2000 | 1.75 m (5 ft 9 in) | 62 kg (137 lb) | 288 cm (113 in) | 279 cm (110 in) | (Poland) PSPS Chemik Police |
| 13 | Klaudia Laskowska | 23 January 2000 | 1.88 m (6 ft 2 in) | 77 kg (170 lb) | 303 cm (119 in) | 291 cm (115 in) | (Poland) KS Palac Bydgoszcz |
| 14 | Paulina Zaborowska | 7 June 2000 | 1.79 m (5 ft 10 in) | 66 kg (146 lb) | 290 cm (110 in) | 271 cm (107 in) | (Poland) LTS Legionovia Legionowo |
| 16 | Julia Mazur | 17 April 2001 | 1.69 m (5 ft 7 in) | 62 kg (137 lb) | 286 cm (113 in) | 270 cm (110 in) | (Poland) SPS Volley Piła |
| 19 | Julia Orzoł | 11 October 2002 | 1.86 m (6 ft 1 in) | 74 kg (163 lb) | 310 cm (120 in) | 297 cm (117 in) | (Poland) LTS Legionovia Legionowo |
| 20 | Zofia Szczotkiewicz | 10 July 2001 | 1.84 m (6 ft 0 in) | 61 kg (134 lb) | 300 cm (120 in) | 290 cm (110 in) | (Poland) SPS Volley Piła |
| 22 | Weronika Szlagowska | 29 November 2001 | 1.88 m (6 ft 2 in) | 70 kg (150 lb) | 306 cm (120 in) | 290 cm (110 in) | (Poland) APS Rumia |

== Russia ==
The following is the Russian roster in the 2019 FIVB Volleyball Women's U20 World Championship.

Head coach: Igor Kurnosov

| No. | Name | Date of birth | Height | Weight | Spike | Block | 2019 club |
|---|---|---|---|---|---|---|---|
| 1 | Varvara Shepeleva | 7 August 2001 | 1.81 m (5 ft 11 in) | 68 kg (150 lb) | 295 cm (116 in) | 280 cm (110 in) | (Russia) Severyanka |
| 3 | Alexandra Borisova | 20 June 2001 | 1.88 m (6 ft 2 in) | 84 kg (185 lb) | 305 cm (120 in) | 297 cm (117 in) | (Russia) Severyanka |
| 4 | Eseniia Mishagina | 12 January 2001 | 1.78 m (5 ft 10 in) | 64 kg (141 lb) | 290 cm (110 in) | 280 cm (110 in) | (Russia) Dinamo Krasnodar |
| 5 | Viktoriia Pushina | 9 March 2000 | 1.97 m (6 ft 6 in) | 88 kg (194 lb) | 310 cm (120 in) | 302 cm (119 in) | (Russia) Severyanka |
| 7 | Olga Zvereva | 5 March 2000 | 1.86 m (6 ft 1 in) | 74 kg (163 lb) | 290 cm (110 in) | 281 cm (111 in) | (Russia) Dinamo Krasnodar |
| 8 | Ekaterina Pipunyrova | 10 February 2000 | 1.88 m (6 ft 2 in) | 69 kg (152 lb) | 305 cm (120 in) | 297 cm (117 in) | (Russia) Dinamo Krasnodar |
| 10 | Veronika Rasputnaia | 29 August 2001 | 1.77 m (5 ft 10 in) | 71 kg (157 lb) | 295 cm (116 in) | 285 cm (112 in) | (Russia) UZGU Atom |
| 11 | Yulia Brovkina | 31 May 2001 | 1.96 m (6 ft 5 in) | 70 kg (150 lb) | 305 cm (120 in) | 297 cm (117 in) | (Russia) Lokomotiv Kaliningrad |
| 14 | Polina Shemanova | 21 January 2001 | 1.82 m (6 ft 0 in) | 55 kg (121 lb) | 296 cm (117 in) | 290 cm (110 in) | (Russia) Nevskiye Zvezdy |
| 15 | Valeriya Shevchuk (C) | 19 February 2001 | 1.82 m (6 ft 0 in) | 60 kg (130 lb) | 302 cm (119 in) | 297 cm (117 in) | (Russia) Lokomotiv Kaliningrad |
| 17 | Elizaveta Fitisova | 21 September 2001 | 1.87 m (6 ft 2 in) | 66 kg (146 lb) | 305 cm (120 in) | 295 cm (116 in) | (Russia) Uralochka-NTMK |
| 18 | Oxana Yakushina | 24 January 2001 | 1.91 m (6 ft 3 in) | 73 kg (161 lb) | 305 cm (120 in) | 297 cm (117 in) | (Russia) Lipetsk |

== Rwanda ==
The following is the Rwandan roster in the 2019 FIVB Volleyball Women's U20 World Championship.

Head coach: Christophe Mudahinyuka

| No. | Name | Date of birth | Height | Weight | Spike | Block | 2019 club |
|---|---|---|---|---|---|---|---|
| 1 | Clementine Kayitesi | 1 January 2001 | 1.72 m (5 ft 8 in) | 60 kg (130 lb) | 265 cm (104 in) | 255 cm (100 in) | (Rwanda) IPRC |
| 2 | Fiellette Uzamukunda | 15 February 2000 | 1.74 m (5 ft 9 in) | 60 kg (130 lb) | 255 cm (100 in) | 240 cm (94 in) | (Rwanda) RUHANGO |
| 3 | Charlotte Mushimiyimana | 1 January 2002 | 1.67 m (5 ft 6 in) | 58 kg (128 lb) | 255 cm (100 in) | 245 cm (96 in) | (Rwanda) ST JOSEPH |
| 4 | Iris Ndagijimana | 3 July 2000 | 1.78 m (5 ft 10 in) | 63 kg (139 lb) | 265 cm (104 in) | 255 cm (100 in) | (Rwanda) ST ALOYS |
| 6 | Albertine Uwiringiyimana | 7 July 2003 | 1.82 m (6 ft 0 in) | 59 kg (130 lb) | 281 cm (111 in) | 256 cm (101 in) | (Rwanda) ST JOSEPH |
| 7 | Donatha Musabyemaliya | 1 January 2000 | 1.84 m (6 ft 0 in) | 65 kg (143 lb) | 270 cm (110 in) | 255 cm (100 in) | (Rwanda) ST ALOYS |
| 8 | Penelope Musabyimana | 1 February 2001 | 1.73 m (5 ft 8 in) | 64 kg (141 lb) | 275 cm (108 in) | 255 cm (100 in) | (Rwanda) APR Volleyball Club |
| 9 | Francoise Yankurije | 19 December 2000 | 1.84 m (6 ft 0 in) | 66 kg (146 lb) | 280 cm (110 in) | 260 cm (100 in) | (Rwanda) ST JOSEPH |
| 10 | Munezero Valentine (c) | 7 January 2000 | 1.82 m (6 ft 0 in) | 65 kg (143 lb) | 280 cm (110 in) | 260 cm (100 in) | (Rwanda) APR Volleyball Club |
| 11 | Olive Nzamukosha | 3 July 2000 | 1.73 m (5 ft 8 in) | 60 kg (130 lb) | 270 cm (110 in) | 250 cm (98 in) | (Rwanda) ST ALOYS |
| 12 | Zulfati Teta | 14 January 2000 | 1.87 m (6 ft 2 in) | 70 kg (150 lb) | 275 cm (108 in) | 255 cm (100 in) | (Rwanda) IPRC |
| 14 | Kellia Umutoni | 14 April 2001 | 1.9 m (6 ft 3 in) | 71 kg (157 lb) | 275 cm (108 in) | 255 cm (100 in) | (Rwanda) ST ALOYS |

== Serbia ==
The following is the Serbian roster in the 2019 FIVB Volleyball Women's U20 World Championship.

Head coach: Marijana Boricic

| No. | Name | Date of birth | Height | Weight | Spike | Block | 2019 club |
|---|---|---|---|---|---|---|---|
| 3 | Bojana Gocanin | 25 September 2002 | 1.79 m (5 ft 10 in) | 66 kg (146 lb) | 286 cm (113 in) | 276 cm (109 in) | (Serbia) Takovo Zvezda Helios GM |
| 4 | Isidora Rodic | 27 January 2001 | 1.85 m (6 ft 1 in) | 77 kg (170 lb) | 298 cm (117 in) | 289 cm (114 in) | (Serbia) VIZURA Beograd |
| 6 | Vanja Savic | 13 May 2002 | 1.88 m (6 ft 2 in) | 73 kg (161 lb) | 306 cm (120 in) | 295 cm (116 in) | (Serbia) Omladinac NB |
| 8 | Tara Taubner | 11 January 2002 | 1.88 m (6 ft 2 in) | 75 kg (165 lb) | 310 cm (120 in) | 305 cm (120 in) | (Serbia) Crvena Zvezda Beograd |
| 9 | Rada Perovic | 13 April 2001 | 1.82 m (6 ft 0 in) | 74 kg (163 lb) | 290 cm (110 in) | 280 cm (110 in) | (Serbia) KLEK Klek |
| 10 | Miljana Glusac | 3 September 2000 | 1.86 m (6 ft 1 in) | 72 kg (159 lb) | 295 cm (116 in) | 287 cm (113 in) | (Serbia) Jedinstvo SP |
| 11 | Milica Milunovic | 27 February 2001 | 1.84 m (6 ft 0 in) | 65 kg (143 lb) | 290 cm (110 in) | 280 cm (110 in) | (Serbia) Crvena Zvezda Beograd |
| 12 | Jovana Mirosavljevic (c) | 16 January 2000 | 1.83 m (6 ft 0 in) | 68 kg (150 lb) | 290 cm (110 in) | 281 cm (111 in) | (Serbia) Jedinstvo SP |
| 14 | Ana-Marija Jonjev | 1 January 2000 | 1.78 m (5 ft 10 in) | 65 kg (143 lb) | 275 cm (108 in) | 268 cm (106 in) | (Serbia) Partizan |
| 16 | Veronika Djokic | 27 August 2001 | 1.87 m (6 ft 2 in) | 74 kg (163 lb) | 298 cm (117 in) | 287 cm (113 in) | (Serbia) Jedinstvo SP |
| 20 | Jovana Cvetkovic | 25 March 2002 | 1.86 m (6 ft 1 in) | 68 kg (150 lb) | 298 cm (117 in) | 287 cm (113 in) | (Serbia) TENT Obrenovac |
| 28 | Ana Pejicic | 5 November 2000 | 1.9 m (6 ft 3 in) | 69 kg (152 lb) | 299 cm (118 in) | 288 cm (113 in) | (Serbia) Vizura Beograd |

== Turkey ==
The following is the Turkish roster in the 2019 FIVB Volleyball Women's U20 World Championship.

Head coach: Çatma Şahin

| No. | Name | Date of birth | Height | Weight | Spike | Block | 2019 club |
|---|---|---|---|---|---|---|---|
| 1 | Simay Kurt | 29 July 2000 | 1.73 m (5 ft 8 in) | 68 kg (150 lb) | 260 cm (100 in) | 285 cm (112 in) | (Turkey) BEYLİKDÜZÜ VOLEYBOL İHTİSAS |
| 3 | Eylül Karadaş | 3 September 2001 | 1.75 m (5 ft 9 in) | 67 kg (148 lb) | 280 cm (110 in) | 278 cm (109 in) | (Turkey) İLBANK |
| 5 | Merve Atlier | 31 March 2000 | 1.91 m (6 ft 3 in) | 75 kg (165 lb) | 310 cm (120 in) | 296 cm (117 in) | (Turkey) Eczacibasi VitrA Istanbul |
| 6 | Nazlı Eda Kafkas | 16 November 2001 | 1.8 m (5 ft 11 in) | 62 kg (137 lb) | 286 cm (113 in) | 276 cm (109 in) | (Turkey) VAKIFBANK |
| 7 | Elif Sude Erginbaş | 27 June 2001 | 0.66 m (2 ft 2 in) | 182 kg (401 lb) | 284 cm (112 in) | 276 cm (109 in) | (Turkey) VAKIFBANK |
| 10 | Melis Katipoğlu | 26 September 2000 | 1.85 m (6 ft 1 in) | 70 kg (150 lb) | 286 cm (113 in) | 274 cm (108 in) | (Turkey) ECZACIBAŞI |
| 11 | Zeynep Uzen | 15 May 2000 | 1.82 m (6 ft 0 in) | 66 kg (146 lb) | 293 cm (115 in) | 278 cm (109 in) | (Turkey) ECZACIBAŞI |
| 13 | Zeynep Sude Demirel | 27 November 2000 | 1.98 m (6 ft 6 in) | 80 kg (180 lb) | 308 cm (121 in) | 300 cm (120 in) | (Turkey) VAKIFBANK |
| 14 | Yaprak Erkek | 2 September 2001 | 1.82 m (6 ft 0 in) | 60 kg (130 lb) | 300 cm (120 in) | 286 cm (113 in) | (Turkey) İLBANK |
| 15 | Aysun Aygör | 21 September 2001 | 1.82 m (6 ft 0 in) | 66 kg (146 lb) | 290 cm (110 in) | 288 cm (113 in) | (Turkey) HALKBANK |
| 16 | Yaren Işik | 7 October 2001 | 1.86 m (6 ft 1 in) | 70 kg (150 lb) | 298 cm (117 in) | 297 cm (117 in) | (Turkey) KARŞIYAKA |
| 17 | Derya Cebecioglu (c) | 24 October 2000 | 1.85 m (6 ft 1 in) | 65 kg (143 lb) | 290 cm (110 in) | 280 cm (110 in) | (Turkey) VAKIFBANK |

== United States ==
The following is the American roster in the 2019 FIVB Volleyball Women's U20 World Championship.

Head coach: Jerritt Elliott

| No. | Name | Date of birth | Height | Weight | Spike | Block | 2019 club |
|---|---|---|---|---|---|---|---|
| 3 | Brooke Nuneviller | 25 January 2000 | 1.80 m (5 ft 11 in) | 73 kg (161 lb) | 297 cm (117 in) | 282 cm (111 in) | (United States) University of Oregon |
| 4 | Amelia Tuaniga | 21 December 2001 | 1.75 m (5 ft 9 in) | 82 kg (181 lb) | 295 cm (116 in) | 279 cm (110 in) | (United States) Long Beach State University |
| 5 | Azhani Tealer | 6 January 2001 | 1.78 m (5 ft 10 in) | 84 kg (185 lb) | 297 cm (117 in) | 282 cm (111 in) | (United States) University of Kentucky |
| 6 | Logan Eggleston (C) | 13 November 2000 | 1.85 m (6 ft 1 in) | 87 kg (192 lb) | 318 cm (125 in) | 300 cm (120 in) | (United States) University of Texas |
| 7 | Jenna Wenaas | 28 June 2001 | 1.85 m (6 ft 1 in) | 73 kg (161 lb) | 287 cm (113 in) | 277 cm (109 in) | (United States) University of Minnesota |
| 9 | Skylar Fields | 17 February 2001 | 1.88 m (6 ft 2 in) | 79 kg (174 lb) | 318 cm (125 in) | 310 cm (120 in) | (United States) University of Texas |
| 11 | Molly Phillips | 31 January 2001 | 1.88 m (6 ft 2 in) | 77 kg (170 lb) | 307 cm (121 in) | 297 cm (117 in) | (United States) University of Texas |
| 13 | Ella Powell | 19 July 2000 | 1.88 m (6 ft 2 in) | 66 kg (146 lb) | 297 cm (117 in) | 290 cm (110 in) | (United States) University of Washington |
| 15 | Katherine Clark | 7 January 2000 | 1.91 m (6 ft 3 in) | 79 kg (174 lb) | 310 cm (120 in) | 310 cm (120 in) | (United States) Texas Christian University |
| 17 | Anna Dixon | 21 August 2000 | 1.91 m (6 ft 3 in) | 82 kg (181 lb) | 310 cm (120 in) | 310 cm (120 in) | (United States) Kansas State University |
| 19 | Kendall Kipp | 12 December 2000 | 1.98 m (6 ft 6 in) | 84 kg (185 lb) | 323 cm (127 in) | 307 cm (121 in) | (United States) Stanford University |
| 20 | Heather Gneiting | 12 May 2000 | 1.98 m (6 ft 6 in) | 88 kg (194 lb) | 310 cm (120 in) | 310 cm (120 in) | (United States) Brigham Young University |
