= Soviet Union women's national under-21 volleyball team =

Soviet Union U20
- Association: Volleyball Federation Of Soviet Union
- Confederation: CEV

Uniforms
Home	Away	Third

FIVB U21 World Championship
- Appearances: 6 (First in 1977)
- Best result: (gold) Champions : (1991)

CEV Europe U19 Championship
- Appearances: 12 (First in 1966)
- Best result: (gold) Champions : (1966, 1969, 1971, 1973, 1975, 1977, 1979, 1982, 1984, 1986, 1988, 1990)
- www.volley.ru (in Russian)

The Soviet Union women's national under-20 volleyball team represents Soviet Union in international women's volleyball competitions and friendly matches under the age 20 and it was ruled by the Soviet Volleyball Federation That was a member of The Federation of International Volleyball FIVB and also a part of The European Volleyball Confederation CEV.

== Results ==
=== FIVB U20 World Championship ===
Champions Runners up Third place Fourth place

FIVB U20 World Championship
Year	Round	Position	Pld	W	L	SW	SL	Squad
(Brazil) 1977		9th place						
(Mexico) 1981		9th place						
(Italy) 1985		6th place						
(South Korea) 1987		5th place						
(Peru) 1989		9th place						
(Czechoslovakia) 1991		Champions						
Total	1 Title	6/6						—

=== Europe U19 Championship ===
Champions Runners up Third place Fourth place

Europe U19 Championship
Year	Round	Position	Pld	W	L	SW	SL	Squad
(Hungary) 1966		Champions						
(Soviet Union) 1969		Champions						
(Italy) 1971		Champions						
(Netherlands) 1973		Champions						
(West Germany) 1975		Champions						
(Socialist Federal Republic of Yugoslavia) 1977		Champions						
(Spain) 1979		Champions						
(West Germany) 1982		Champions						
(France) 1984		Champions						
(Bulgaria) 1986		Champions						
(Italy) 1988		Champions						
(Austria) 1990		Champions						
Total	12 Titles	12/12						
