= CEV Women's U20 Volleyball European Championship =

- Current season, competition or edition: 2024 Women's U20 Volleyball European Championship
- Sport: Volleyball
- Founded: 1966; 60 years ago
- First season: 1966
- No. of teams: 16
- Continent: Europe (CEV)
- Most recent champion: Turkey (3rd title)
- Most titles: Soviet Union (12 titles)
- Website: cev.eu

The Women's Junior European Volleyball Championship is a sport competition for national teams with players under 20 years, currently held biannually and organized by the European Volleyball Confederation, the volleyball federation from Europe. As of the 2024 edition, the CEV will align the age limit for the men's and women's competitions to U20.

== Results summary ==
Year	Host	Final			3rd place match			Teams
Year	Host	Champions	Score	Runners-up	3rd place	Score	4th place	Teams
1966; Details	Hungary	Soviet Union	Round-robin	East Germany	Czechoslovakia	Round-robin	Bulgaria	12
1969; Details	Soviet Union	Soviet Union	Round-robin	Bulgaria	Poland	Round-robin	Czechoslovakia	12
1971; Details	Italy	Soviet Union	Round-robin	Romania	Poland	Round-robin	West Germany	8
1973; Details	Netherlands	Soviet Union	Round-robin	Czechoslovakia	Hungary	Round-robin	Poland	17
1975; Details	West Germany	Soviet Union	Round-robin	Czechoslovakia	East Germany	Round-robin	Bulgaria	12
1977; Details	(Socialist Federal Republic of Yugoslavia); Yugoslavia	Soviet Union	3–2	Czechoslovakia	East Germany	3–1	Poland	12
1979; Details	Spain	Soviet Union	Round-robin	East Germany	Czechoslovakia	Round-robin	Bulgaria	12
1982; Details	West Germany	Soviet Union	Round-robin	Bulgaria	Czechoslovakia	Round-robin	East Germany	12
1984; Details	France	Soviet Union	Round-robin	Italy	Czechoslovakia	Round-robin	Bulgaria	12
1986; Details	Bulgaria	Soviet Union	Round-robin	East Germany	Bulgaria	Round-robin	Czechoslovakia	12
1988; Details	Italy	Soviet Union	3–0	Italy	Romania	3–0	Bulgaria	12
1990; Details	Austria	Soviet Union	3–0	West Germany	Czechoslovakia	3–0	Italy	12
1992; Details	Greece	CIS	3–1	Czechoslovakia	Italy	3–1	France	12
1994; Details	Hungary	Russia	3–1	Italy	Germany	3–0	Netherlands	12
1996; Details	Turkey	Italy	3–0	Russia	Poland	3–0	France	12
1998; Details	Belgium	Italy	3–1	Russia	Czech Republic	3–1	Belgium	12
2000; Details	Switzerland	Czech Republic	3–2	Italy	Poland	3–2	Russia	12
2002; Details	Croatia	Poland	3–0	Ukraine	Belarus	3–0	Netherlands	12
2004; Details	Slovakia	Italy	3–0	Serbia and Montenegro	Russia	3–0	Croatia	12
2006; Details	France	Italy	3–0	Croatia	Ukraine	3–0	Russia	12
2008; Details	Italy	Italy	3–0	Russia	Turkey	3–1	Serbia	12
2010; Details	Serbia	Italy	3–1	Serbia	Czech Republic	3–1	Germany	12
2012; Details	Turkey	Turkey	3–0	Serbia	Italy	3–0	Russia	12
2014; Details	Estonia / Finland	Serbia	3–2	Slovenia	Turkey	3–1	Greece	12
2016; Details	Hungary / Slovakia	Russia	3–0	Serbia	Turkey	3–0	Belgium	12
2018; Details	Albania	Italy	3–2	Russia	Poland	3–2	Turkey	12
2020; Details	Bosnia and Herzegovina / Croatia	Turkey	3–2	Serbia	Belarus	3–1	France	9
2022; Details	North Macedonia	Italy	3–2	Serbia	Poland	3–1	Netherlands	12
2024; Details	(Republic of Ireland); Bulgaria / Ireland	Turkey	3–2	Italy	Belgium	3–2	Poland	16
2027; Details	Italy / Malta		–			–		16

== Medal table ==
Rank	Nation	Gold	Silver	Bronze	Total
1	Soviet Union	12	0	0	12
2	Italy	8	5	2	15
3	Turkey	3	0	3	6
4	Russia	2	4	1	7
5	Serbia	1	5	0	6
6	Poland	1	0	6	7
7	Czech Republic	1	0	2	3
8	CIS	1	0	0	1
9	Czechoslovakia	0	4	5	9
10	East Germany	0	3	2	5
11	Bulgaria	0	2	1	3
12	Romania	0	1	1	2
12	Ukraine	0	1	1	2
14	Croatia	0	1	0	1
14	Serbia and Montenegro	0	1	0	1
14	Slovenia	0	1	0	1
14	West Germany	0	1	0	1
18	Belarus	0	0	2	2
19	Belgium	0	0	1	1
19	Germany	0	0	1	1
19	Hungary	0	0	1	1
Totals (21 entries)		29	29	29	87

== Participating nations ==
Nation	(Hungary) 1966	(Soviet Union) 1969	(Italy) 1971	(Netherlands) 1973	(Germany) 1975	(Socialist Federal Republic of Yugoslavia) 1977	(Spain) 1979	(Germany) 1982	(France) 1984	(Bulgaria) 1986	(Italy) 1988	(Austria) 1990	(Greece) 1992	(Hungary) 1994	(Turkey) 1996	(Belgium) 1998	(Switzerland) 2000	(Croatia) 2002	(Slovakia) 2004	(France) 2006	(Italy) 2008	(Serbia) 2010	(Turkey) 2012	(Finland) (Estonia) 2014	(Hungary) (Slovakia) 2016	(Albania) 2018	(Bosnia and Herzegovina) (Croatia) 2020	(North Macedonia) 2022	(Bulgaria) (Republic of Ireland) 2024	Years
Albania																										12th				1
Austria	12th			14th			12th					12th																		4
Belarus																		3rd	10th	11th					11th	8th	3rd			6
Belgium		12th		12th	11th				10th							4th	11th			8th	7th	11th	8th	8th	4th				Q	13
Bosnia and Herzegovina																											9th			1
Bulgaria	4th	2nd	6th	8th	4th	8th	4th	2nd	4th	3rd	4th	6th	6th			12th							11th	5th	8th	9th	6th		Q	20
CIS													1st																	1
Croatia														5th	6th	7th	7th	11th	4th	2nd	12th				12th		7th	6th	Q	12
Czech Republic														8th	10th	3rd	1st	10th		9th	10th	3rd	10th	6th					Q	11
Czechoslovakia	3rd	4th	5th	2nd	2nd	2nd	3rd	3rd	3rd	4th	7th	3rd	2nd																	13
Denmark				17th																										1
East Germany	2nd	5th		9th	3rd	3rd	2nd	4th	5th	2nd	5th	9th																		11
Estonia																								12th						1
Finland							11th																	11th				8th	Q	4
France				13th	12th			7th	11th		8th		4th	11th	4th	10th		9th		7th	9th		12th		9th	11th	4th			16
Germany													7th	3rd	9th	11th	5th	8th	7th		5th	4th	5th		7th	6th	DNP			12
Greece										12th	10th	10th	8th	12th	7th									4th				9th		8
Hungary	7th	6th		3rd		5th	7th	9th	8th	8th			10th	9th			10th	12th				12th			10th					14
Ireland																													Q	1
Italy		9th	7th	10th	8th	6th	6th	5th	2nd	10th	2nd	4th	3rd	2nd	1st	1st	2nd	7th	1st	1st	1st	1st	3rd	9th	5th	1st	DNP	1st	Q	27
Latvia																	12th													1
Netherlands	9th	8th	8th	6th	10th	9th	8th	6th	6th	9th	11th	11th	11th	4th		8th		4th	8th	10th	11th	9th		10th		7th		4th	Q	24
North Macedonia																												12th		1
Poland	5th	3rd	3rd	4th	6th	4th	5th			6th	6th	8th		7th	3rd	5th	3rd	1st	11th	12th	6th	10th	6th			3rd	5th	3rd	Q	24
Portugal																													Q	1
Romania	6th	7th	2nd	7th	9th	10th				7th	3rd	5th	5th		8th													10th		12
Russia														1st	2nd	2nd	4th	6th	3rd	4th	2nd	7th	4th	7th	1st	2nd	DNP			13
Serbia																					4th	2nd	2nd	1st	2nd	5th	2nd	2nd	Q	9
Serbia and Montenegro																			2nd	6th										2
Slovakia																			9th			6th	9th		6th	10th	8th			6
Slovenia																						8th	7th	2nd				7th	Q	5
Soviet Union	1st	1st	1st	1st	1st	1st	1st	1st	1st	1st	1st	1st																		12
Spain							10th	12th							12th		6th												Q	5
Sweden				16th					12th																				Q	3
Switzerland				15th									12th				9th		12th									11th		5
Turkey	10th					11th		11th			12th	7th	9th	10th	11th	9th	8th	5th	6th	5th	3rd	5th	1st	3rd	3rd	4th	1st	5th	Q	22
Ukraine														6th	5th			2nd	5th	3rd	8th								Q	7
West Germany	11th	11th	4th	5th	5th	12th	9th	8th	7th	5th	9th	2nd																		12
Yugoslavia	8th	10th		11th	7th	7th		10th	9th	11th						6th														9
