= Japan women's national under-21 volleyball team =

Japan U21
- Association: Japan Volleyball Association (JVA)
- Confederation: AVC
- Head coach: Hiroyuki Yamaguchi

Uniforms
Home	Away	Third

FIVB U21 World Championship
- Appearances: 19 (First in 1977)
- Best result: (gold) (2019)

Asian U20 Championship
- Appearances: 21 (First in 1980)
- Best result: (gold) (1984, 1986, 1988, 1990, 2008, 2018, 2022)
- http://www.jva.or.jp/

The Japan women's national under-21 volleyball team represents Japan in women's under-20 & under-21 volleyball events, it is controlled and managed by the Japanese Volleyball Association that is a member of Asian volleyball body Asian Volleyball Confederation (AVC) and the international volleyball body government the Fédération Internationale de Volleyball (FIVB).

== Competition record ==
=== FIVB U21 World Championship ===
Champions Runners up Third place Fourth place

FIVB U21 World Championship
Year	Round	Position	GP	MW	ML	SW	SL	Squad
(Brazil) 1977	Semifinals	3rd place						Squad
(Mexico) 1981	Semifinals	3rd place						Squad
(Italy) 1985	Final	Runners-up						Squad
(South Korea) 1987	Semifinals	4th place						Squad
(Peru) 1989	Semifinals	3rd place						Squad
(Czechoslovakia) 1991	Semifinals	3rd place						Squad
(Brazil) 1993		7th place						Squad
(Thailand) 1995	Semifinals	4th place						Squad
(Poland) 1997	Semifinals	4th place						Squad
(Canada) 1999		6th place						Squad
(Dominican Republic) 2001	Did not qualify							
(Thailand) 2003	Did not qualify							
(Turkey) 2005		5th place						Squad
(Thailand) 2007	Semifinals	3rd place						Squad
(Mexico) 2009	Did not qualify							
(Peru) 2011		11th place						Squad
(Czech Republic) 2013	Final	Runners-up						Squad
(Puerto Rico) 2015	Semifinals	4th place						Squad
(Mexico) 2017	Semifinals	3rd place						Squad
(Mexico) 2019	Final	Champions	8	8	0	24	7	Squad
(Belgium) (Netherlands) 2021	Qualified but withdrew							
(Mexico) 2023	Semifinals	4th place	8	5	3	16	14	Squad
(Indonesia) 2025	Final	Runners up	9	8	1	26	6	Squad
Total	1 Title	19/23	—	—	—	—	—	—

=== Asian U20 Championship ===
Champions Runners up Third place Fourth place

Asian U20 Championship
Year	Round	Position	GP	MW	ML	SW	SL
(South Korea) 1980	Round robin	Runners up	5	4	1	12	3
(Australia) 1984		Champions					
(Thailand) 1986	Final	Champions	6	5	1	17	6
(Indonesia) 1988	Final	Champions	6	5	1	16	4
(Thailand) 1990	Final	Champions					
Total	6 Titles	21/21					

== Team ==
=== Current squad ===
The following is the Japanese roster for the 2025 U21 World Championship.

Head coach: (Japan) Hiroyuki Yamaguchi

No.	Name	Pos.	Date of birth	Height	Weight	Spike	2025 club
1	Niina Kumagai	S	17 February 2005	1.65 m (5 ft 5 in)	57 kg (126 lb)	272 cm (107 in)	(Japan) Tsukuba University
3	Chika Yanagi	MB	6 April 2006	1.85 m (6 ft 1 in)	0 kg (0 lb)	300 cm (120 in)	(Japan) Denso Airybees
5	Miina Inoue	MB	22 January 2006	1.81 m (5 ft 11 in)	0 kg (0 lb)	303 cm (119 in)	(Japan) Hisamitsu Springs
6	Mayu Watanabe	OH	17 October 2006	1.81 m (5 ft 11 in)	0 kg (0 lb)	0 cm (0 in)	(Japan) TWCPE
7	Ichiyo Ito	MB	16 January 2006	1.79 m (5 ft 10 in)	0 kg (0 lb)	305 cm (120 in)	(Japan) NEC Red Rockets
8	Koyumi Fukumura	OH	29 June 2006	1.78 m (5 ft 10 in)	0 kg (0 lb)	295 cm (116 in)	(Japan) Osaka Marvelous
9	Minami Nishimura	OH	9 November 2006	1.77 m (5 ft 10 in)	68 kg (150 lb)	296 cm (117 in)	(Japan) Tokai Mermaids
10	Mio Kitagawa	MB	19 April 2006	1.76 m (5 ft 9 in)	60 kg (130 lb)	299 cm (118 in)	(Japan) Queenseis Kariya
13	Chisato Hanaoka	S	13 June 2006	1.75 m (5 ft 9 in)	0 kg (0 lb)	285 cm (112 in)	(Japan) Toray Arrows Shiga
14	Sae Omori	OH	16 June 2006	1.73 m (5 ft 8 in)	55 kg (121 lb)	298 cm (117 in)	(Japan) Tsukuba University
16	Anna Uemura	OH	23 March 2006	1.67 m (5 ft 6 in)	68 kg (150 lb)	301 cm (119 in)	(Japan) PFU BlueCats
19	Ami Uchizawa	L	6 August 2005	1.52 m (5 ft 0 in)	0 kg (0 lb)	0 cm (0 in)	(Japan) TWCPE

=== Notable players ===
- Nichika Yamada
- Mayu Ishikawa
- Ayaka Araki
- Tsukasa Nakagawa
