= Andreia Marras =

Brazilian volleyball player (born 1971)

Personal information
- Born: 14 January 1971 (age 55); Várzea Grande, Brazil
- Height: 1.76 m (5 ft 9 in)

Volleyball information
- Number: 6 (national team)

Career
Years	Teams
1994	L'Acqua di Fiori/Minas

National team
1994	Brazil

Andreia Marras (born 14 January 1971) is a retired Brazilian female volleyball player. She was part of the Brazil women's national volleyball team.

She participated in the 1994 FIVB Volleyball Women's World Championship. On club level she played with L'Acqua di Fiori/Minas.

== Clubs ==
- L'Acqua di Fiori/Minas (1994)
