= 1991 FIVB Volleyball Women's U20 World Championship =

1991 FIVB Women's U20 World Championship
Tournament details
- Host country: Czechoslovakia
- Dates: July 26 – August 4, 1991
- Teams: 16
- Venues: 2 (in Brno host cities)

Final positions
- Champions: Soviet Union (1st title)

The 1991 FIVB Women's U20 World Championship was held in Brno, Czechoslovakia from July 26 to August 4, 1991. 16 teams participated in the tournament.

== Qualification process ==
Confederation	Method of Qualification	Venue	Vacancies	Qualified
FIVB	Host		1	Czechoslovakia
NORCECA	NORCECA Election		1	Cuba
CEV	1990 European Junior Championship	Salzburg, Austria	6	Soviet Union; Germany; Italy; Romania; Bulgaria; Poland*
AVC	1990 Asian Junior Championship	Chiang Mai, Thailand	4	Japan; South Korea; China; Chinese Taipei
CSV	1990 South American Junior Championship	Tucuman, Argentina	4	Brazil; Peru; Argentina; Venezuela
Total			16	

- * Poland replaced Turkey.

== Pools composition ==
Pool A	Pool B	Pool C	Pool D
Czechoslovakia; Bulgaria; Chinese Taipei; Venezuela	Brazil; China; Germany; Romania	Peru; Poland; South Korea; Soviet Union	Argentina; Cuba; Italy; Japan

== Preliminary round ==
=== Pool A ===
Pos	Team	Pld	W	L	Pts	SW	SL	SR	SPW	SPL	SPR	Qualification
1	Czechoslovakia	3	2	1	5	8	4	2.000	0	0	—	Seeding group
2	Chinese Taipei	3	2	1	5	7	5	1.400	0	0	—	Elimination group
3	Bulgaria	3	2	1	5	8	6	1.333	0	0	—	Elimination group
4	Venezuela	3	0	3	3	1	9	0.111	0	0	—	Eliminated

Date	Game		
26 Jul	Czechoslovakia	3–0	Venezuela
26 Jul	Chinese Taipei	3–2	Bulgaria
27 Jul	Bulgaria	3–1	Venezuela
27 Jul	Czechoslovakia	3–1	Chinese Taipei
28 Jul	Chinese Taipei	3–0	Venezuela
28 Jul	Bulgaria	3–2	Czechoslovakia

=== Pool B ===
Pos	Team	Pld	W	L	Pts	SW	SL	SR	SPW	SPL	SPR	Qualification
1	China	3	3	0	6	9	2	4.500	0	0	—	Seeding group
2	Brazil	3	2	1	5	6	3	2.000	0	0	—	Elimination group
3	Germany	3	1	2	4	5	6	0.833	0	0	—	Elimination group
4	Romania	3	0	3	3	0	9	0.000	0	0	—	Eliminated

Date	Game		
26 Jul	China	3–2	Germany
26 Jul	Brazil	3–0	Romania
27 Jul	China	3–0	Romania
27 Jul	Brazil	3–0	Germany
28 Jul	Germany	3–0	Romania
28 Jul	China	3–0	Brazil

=== Pool C ===
Pos	Team	Pld	W	L	Pts	SW	SL	SR	SPW	SPL	SPR	Qualification
1	Soviet Union	3	3	0	6	9	0	MAX	0	0	—	Seeding group
2	South Korea	3	2	1	5	6	3	2.000	0	0	—	Elimination group
3	Peru	3	1	2	4	3	6	0.500	0	0	—	Elimination group
4	Poland	3	0	3	3	0	9	0.000	0	0	—	Eliminated

Date	Game		
26 Jul	Soviet Union	3–0	Poland
26 Jul	South Korea	3–0	Peru
27 Jul	Soviet Union	3–0	South Korea
27 Jul	Peru	3–0	Poland
28 Jul	South Korea	3–0	Poland
28 Jul	Soviet Union	3–0	Peru

=== Pool D ===
Pos	Team	Pld	W	L	Pts	SW	SL	SR	SPW	SPL	SPR	Qualification
1	Japan	3	3	0	6	9	0	MAX	0	0	—	Seeding group
2	Italy	3	2	1	5	6	3	2.000	0	0	—	Elimination group
3	Argentina	3	1	2	4	3	8	0.375	0	0	—	Elimination group
4	Cuba	3	0	3	3	2	9	0.222	0	0	—	Eliminated

Date	Game		
26 Jul	Japan	3–0	Cuba
26 Jul	Italy	3–0	Argentina
27 Jul	Argentina	3–2	Cuba
27 Jul	Japan	3–0	Italy
28 Jul	Japan	3–0	Argentina
28 Jul	Italy	3–0	Cuba

== Second round ==
=== Play off – elimination group ===
Date	Game			Set 1	Set 2	Set 3	Set 4	Set 5	Total
30 Jul	Soviet Union	3–0	Czechoslovakia	15–8	15–12	15–12			45–32
30 Jul	Japan	3–2	China	17–16	13–15	17–16	8–15	15–12	70–74

=== Play off – seeding group ===
Date	Game			Set 1	Set 2	Set 3	Set 4	Set 5	Total
30 Jul	Brazil	3–0	Argentina	15–6	15–3	16–1			45–10
30 Jul	South Korea	3–0	Bulgaria	15–5	15–1	15–4			45–10
30 Jul	Japan	3–0	Peru	15–10	15–6	15–8			45–24
30 Jul	Germany	3–0	Chinese Taipei	15–5	16–14	15–7			46–26

== Final round ==
Quarterfinals
August 2 – Brno
Soviet Union	3
Italy	0
August 2 – Brno
China	3
South Korea	0
August 2 – Brno
Brazil	3
Czechoslovakia	0
August 2 – Brno
Japan	3
Germany	0

Semifinals
August 3 – Brno
Soviet Union	3
China	2
August 3 – Brno
Brazil	3
Japan	2

Final
August 4 – Brno
Soviet Union	3
Brazil	0
3rd place
August 4 – Brno
China	1
Japan	3

5th–8th places
August 3 – Brno
Italy	0
South Korea	3
August 3 – Brno
Czechoslovakia	3
Germany	0

5th place
August 4 – Brno
South Korea	3
Czechoslovakia	1
7th place
August 4 – Brno
Italy	3
Germany	0

=== Quarterfinals ===
Date	Game		
02 Aug	Soviet Union	3–0	Italy
02 Aug	China	3–0	South Korea
02 Aug	Brazil	3–0	Czechoslovakia
02 Aug	Japan	3–0	Germany

=== 5th–8th semifinals ===
Date	Game		
03 Aug	Czechoslovakia	3–0	Germany
03 Aug	South Korea	3–0	Italy

=== Semifinals ===
Date	Game			Set 1	Set 2	Set 3	Set 4	Set 5	Total
03 Aug	Soviet Union	3–2	China	9–15	15–9	15–8	3–15	15–6	57–53
03 Aug	Brazil	3–2	Japan	8–15	15–6	8–15	15–10	15–10	61–56

=== 7th place ===
Date	Game			Set 1	Set 2	Set 3	Set 4	Set 5	Total
04 Aug	Italy	3–0	Germany	17–15	15–11	15–9			47–35

=== 5th place ===
Date	Game			Set 1	Set 2	Set 3	Set 4	Set 5	Total
04 Aug	South Korea	3–1	Czechoslovakia	15–12	11–15	15–11	15–9		56–47

=== 3rd place ===
Date	Game			Set 1	Set 2	Set 3	Set 4	Set 5	Total
04 Aug	Japan	3–1	China	15–2	9–15	16–14	17–15		57–48

=== Final ===
Date	Game			Set 1	Set 2	Set 3	Set 4	Set 5	Total
04 Aug	Soviet Union	3–0	Brazil	15–9	15–12	15–11			45–32

== Final standing ==
Rank	Team
1st place, gold medalist(s)	Soviet Union
2nd place, silver medalist(s)	Brazil
3rd place, bronze medalist(s)	Japan
4	China
5	South Korea
6	Czechoslovakia
7	Italy
8	Germany
9	Chinese Taipei
10	Bulgaria
11	Argentina
12	Peru
13	Cuba
13	Poland
13	Romania
13	Venezuela

1991 FIVB Women's Junior World champions

Soviet Union
1st title

12–woman Roster
Svetlana Vasilevskaya, Tatiana Gratcheva, Elena Ponomareva, Yevgeniya Artamonova, Inna Dashuk, Margarita Okrachkova, Marina Egorova, Elizaveta Tishchenko, Inessa Korkmaz, Natalya Morozova, Yuliya Khamitova and Yuliya Timonova
