= 1985 FIVB Volleyball Women's U20 World Championship =

1985 FIVB Women's U20 World Championship
Tournament details
- Host country: Italy
- Dates: September 12–22, 1985
- Teams: 15
- Venues: 5 (in Brescia, Ancona, Reggio Calabria, Fabriano and Perugia host cities)

Final positions
- Champions: Cuba (1st title)

Tournament awards
- MVP: (Cuba) Mireya Luis

The 1985 FIVB Women's U20 World Championship was held in many Italian cities from September 12 to 22, 1985. 15 teams participated in the tournament.

== Qualification ==
A total of 15 teams qualified for the final tournament. In addition to Italy, who qualified automatically as the hosts, another 14 teams qualified via four separate continental tournament.

Means of qualification	Vacancies	Qualified
Host country	1	Italy
1984 Asian Junior Championship	4	Japan
1984 Asian Junior Championship	4	China
1984 Asian Junior Championship	4	South Korea
1984 Asian Junior Championship	4	Australia *
NORCECA Election	2	Cuba
NORCECA Election	2	Mexico
1984 European Junior Championship	3	Soviet Union
1984 European Junior Championship	3	Czechoslovakia
1984 European Junior Championship	3	Bulgaria
1984 South American Championship	3	Brazil
1984 South American Championship	3	Peru
1984 South American Championship	3	~~Colombia~~ **
Wild card	3	New Zealand
Wild card	3	Finland
Wild card	3	Austria
Total	15	

- * Australia replaced Chinese Taipei.
- ** Colombia declined to participate.

== Pools composition ==
Pool A	Pool B	Pool C	Pool D
Bulgaria; Japan; Mexico; New Zealand	Australia; Austria; Brazil; Soviet Union	China; Finland; Italy; Peru	Czech Republic; Cuba; South Korea

Pool E		Pool F		13th–15th	
1A	Japan	1B	Brazil	4A	New Zealand
1C	China	1D	Cuba	4B	Austria
2A	Bulgaria	2B	Soviet Union	4C	Finland
2C	Italy	2D	South Korea		
3A	Mexico	3B	Australia		
3C	Peru	3D	Czechoslovakia		

== Preliminary round ==
=== Pool A ===
Pos	Team	Pld	W	L	Pts	SW	SL	SR	SPW	SPL	SPR	Qualification
1	Japan	3	3	0	6	9	0	MAX	132	38	3.474	Second round
2	Bulgaria	3	2	1	5	6	3	2.000	112	73	1.534	Second round
3	Mexico	3	1	2	4	3	6	0.500	78	112	0.696	Second round
4	New Zealand	3	0	3	3	0	9	0.000	36	135	0.267	13th place playoff

Date		Score		Set 1	Set 2	Set 3	Set 4	Set 5	Total
11 Sep	Mexico	3–0	New Zealand	15–9	15–6	15–6			45–21
11 Sep	Japan	3–0	Bulgaria	15–9	15–6	15–6			45–21
12 Sep	Japan	3–0	New Zealand	15–4	15–1	15–0			45–5
12 Sep	Bulgaria	3–0	Mexico	16–14	15–1	15–6			46–21
13 Sep	Bulgaria	3–0	New Zealand	15–6	15–1	15–3			45–10
13 Sep	Japan	3–0	Mexico	15–8	15–3	15–1			45–12

=== Pool B ===
Pos	Team	Pld	W	L	Pts	SW	SL	SR	SPW	SPL	SPR	Qualification
1	Brazil	3	3	0	6	9	1	9.000	134	76	1.763	Second round
2	Soviet Union	3	2	1	5	7	3	2.333	144	63	2.286	Second round
3	Australia	3	1	2	4	3	6	0.500	76	124	0.613	Second round
4	Austria	3	0	3	3	0	9	0.000	49	140	0.350	13th place playoff

Date		Score		Set 1	Set 2	Set 3	Set 4	Set 5	Total
11 Sep	Soviet Union	3–0	Australia	15–3	15–8	15–2			45–13
11 Sep	Brazil	3–0	Austria	15–7	15–0	15–2			45–9
12 Sep	Brazil	3–0	Australia	15–5	15–4	15–5			45–14
12 Sep	Soviet Union	3–0	Austria	15–2	15–3	15–1			45–6
13 Sep	Australia	3–1	Austria	15–10	15–3	5–15	15–6		50–34
13 Sep	Brazil	3–1	Soviet Union	15–9	9–15	15–10	15–10		54–44

=== Pool C ===
Pos	Team	Pld	W	L	Pts	SW	SL	SR	SPW	SPL	SPR	Qualification
1	China	3	3	0	6	9	1	9.000	149	76	1.961	Second round
2	Italy	3	2	1	5	7	4	1.750	141	112	1.259	Second round
3	Peru	3	1	2	4	4	6	0.667	105	128	0.820	Second round
4	Finland	3	0	3	3	0	9	0.000	56	135	0.415	13th place playoff

Date		Score		Set 1	Set 2	Set 3	Set 4	Set 5	Total
11 Sep	Italy	3–0	Finland	15–2	15–7	15–6			45–15
11 Sep	China	3–0	Peru	15–4	15–10	15–8			45–22
12 Sep	Italy	3–1	Peru	15–9	15–0	12–15	16–14		58–38
12 Sep	China	3–0	Finland	15–6	15–1	15–9			45–16
13 Sep	China	3–1	Italy	14–16	15–6	15–9	15–7		59–38
13 Sep	Peru	3–0	Finland	15–7	15–12	15–6			45–25

=== Pool D ===
Pos	Team	Pld	W	L	Pts	SW	SL	SR	SPW	SPL	SPR	Qualification
1	Cuba	2	2	0	4	6	1	6.000	101	45	2.244	Second round
2	South Korea	2	1	1	3	4	3	1.333	75	80	0.938	Second round
3	Czechoslovakia	2	0	2	2	0	6	0.000	39	90	0.433	Second round

Date		Score		Set 1	Set 2	Set 3	Set 4	Set 5	Total
11 Sep	South Korea	3–0	Czechoslovakia	15–13	15–5	15–6			45–24
12 Sep	Cuba	3–0	Czechoslovakia	15–9	15–1	15–5			45–15
13 Sep	Cuba	3–1	South Korea	15–4	11–15	15–11	15–3		56–30

== Second round ==
=== Pool E ===
Pos	Team	Pld	W	L	Pts	SW	SL	SR	SPW	SPL	SPR	Qualification
1	China	5	5	0	10	15	2	7.500	251	115	2.183	Semifinals
2	Japan	5	4	1	9	13	3	4.333	216	137	1.577	Semifinals
3	Italy	5	3	2	8	10	7	1.429	211	189	1.116	5th place playoff
4	Peru	5	2	3	7	7	9	0.778	173	191	0.906	5th place playoff
5	Bulgaria	5	1	4	6	3	12	0.250	127	199	0.638	9th place playoff
6	Mexico	5	0	5	5	0	15	0.000	79	226	0.350	9th place playoff

Date		Score		Set 1	Set 2	Set 3	Set 4	Set 5	Total
16 Sep	Peru	3–0	Bulgaria	15–7	15–5	16–14			46–26
16 Sep	China	3–1	Japan	15–7	12–15	15–9	15–8		57–39
16 Sep	Italy	3–0	Mexico	15–6	15–7	15–8			45–21
17 Sep	Japan	3–0	Peru	15–5	15–13	15–3			45–22
17 Sep	China	3–0	Mexico	15–3	15–4	15–1			45–8
17 Sep	Italy	3–0	Bulgaria	15–8	15–11	15–7			45–26
18 Sep	Peru	3–0	Mexico	15–7	15–5	15–5			45–17
18 Sep	China	3–0	Bulgaria	15–3	15–3	15–2			45–8
18 Sep	Japan	3–0	Italy	15–5	15–8	15–12			45–25

=== Pool F ===
Pos	Team	Pld	W	L	Pts	SW	SL	SR	SPW	SPL	SPR	Qualification
1	Brazil	5	5	0	10	15	5	3.000	272	194	1.402	Semifinals
2	Cuba	5	4	1	9	14	4	3.500	254	150	1.693	Semifinals
3	Soviet Union	5	3	2	8	10	7	1.429	221	181	1.221	5th place playoff
4	South Korea	5	2	3	7	9	9	1.000	210	195	1.077	5th place playoff
5	Czechoslovakia	5	1	4	6	4	12	0.333	137	208	0.659	9th place playoff
6	Australia	5	0	5	5	0	15	0.000	59	225	0.262	9th place playoff

Date		Score		Set 1	Set 2	Set 3	Set 4	Set 5	Total
16 Sep	Brazil	3–0	Czechoslovakia	15–6	15–6	15–1			45–13
16 Sep	Soviet Union	3–0	South Korea	15–9	15–6	16–14			46–29
16 Sep	Cuba	3–0	Australia	15–3	15–5	15–4			45–12
17 Sep	Czech Republic	3–0	Australia	15–2	15–7	15–7			45–16
17 Sep	Cuba	3–0	Soviet Union	15–12	15–8	15–9			45–29
17 Sep	Brazil	3–2	South Korea	15–8	15–11	6–15	13–15	15–12	64–61
18 Sep	South Korea	3–0	Australia	15–2	15–1	15–2			45–5
18 Sep	Soviet Union	3–1	Czechoslovakia	12–15	15–7	15–9	15–9		57–40
18 Sep	Brazil	3–2	Cuba	15–10	9–15	10–15	15–10	15–13	64–63

=== 13th–15th places ===
Pos	Team	Pld	W	L	Pts	SW	SL	SR	SPW	SPL	SPR
13	Austria	2	2	0	4	6	1	6.000	102	81	1.259
14	Finland	2	1	1	3	4	3	1.333	99	78	1.269
15	New Zealand	2	0	2	2	0	6	0.000	48	90	0.533

Date		Score		Set 1	Set 2	Set 3	Set 4	Set 5	Total
16 Sep	Austria	3–0	New Zealand	15–7	15–7	15–13			45–27
17 Sep	Finland	3–0	New Zealand	15–5	15–7	15–9			45–21
18 Sep	Austria	3–1	Finland	11–15	16–14	15–10	17–15		57–54

== Final round ==
=== 9th–12th places ===
9th–12th places
Bulgaria	3
Australia	0
Czechoslovakia	3
Mexico	0

9th place
Bulgaria	3
Czechoslovakia	1
11th place
Mexico	3
Australia	0

=== Classification 9th and 12th ===
Date		Score		Set 1	Set 2	Set 3	Set 4	Set 5	Total
21 Sep	Bulgaria	3–0	Australia	15–4	15–10	15–3			45–17
21 Sep	Czechoslovakia	3–0	Mexico	15–7	15–7	15–2			45–16

=== Classification 11th ===
Date		Score		Set 1	Set 2	Set 3	Set 4	Set 5	Total
22 Sep	Mexico	3–0	Australia	15–7	15–7	15–6			45–20

=== Classification 9th ===
Date		Score		Set 1	Set 2	Set 3	Set 4	Set 5	Total
22 Sep	Bulgaria	3–1	Czechoslovakia	8–15	18–16	15–13	17–15		58–59

=== 5th–8th places ===
5th–8th places
South Korea	3
Italy	2
Soviet Union	3
Peru	1

5th place
South Korea	3
Soviet Union	2
7th place
Italy	3
Peru	1

=== Classification 5th and 8th ===
Date		Score		Set 1	Set 2	Set 3	Set 4	Set 5	Total
21 Sep	South Korea	3–2	Italy	13–15	15–3	6–15	15–8	15–4	64–47
21 Sep	Soviet Union	3–1	Peru	15–1	9–15	15–7	15–6		54–29

=== Classification 7th ===
Date		Score		Set 1	Set 2	Set 3	Set 4	Set 5	Total
22 Sep	Italy	3–1	Peru	15–13	4–15	15–7	15–10		49–45

=== Classification 5th ===
Date		Score		Set 1	Set 2	Set 3	Set 4	Set 5	Total
22 Sep	South Korea	3–2	Soviet Union	7–15	7–15	15–13	15–10	15–12	59–65

=== Championship round ===
Semifinals
Cuba	3
China	1
Japan	3
Brazil	0

Final
Cuba	3
Japan	1
Third place
China	3
Brazil	1

=== Semifinals ===
Date		Score		Set 1	Set 2	Set 3	Set 4	Set 5	Total
21 Sep	Cuba	3–1	China	12–15	15–11	15–7	15–5		57–38
21 Sep	Japan	3–0	Brazil	15–6	15–7	15–13			45–26

=== Bronze medal match ===
Date		Score		Set 1	Set 2	Set 3	Set 4	Set 5	Total
22 Sep	China	3–1	Brazil	14–16	15–10	15–5	15–7		61–38

=== Gold medal match ===
Date		Score		Set 1	Set 2	Set 3	Set 4	Set 5	Total
22 Sep	Cuba	3–1	Japan	6–15	15–10	15–10	15–10		51–45

== Final standing ==
Rank	Team
1st place, gold medalist(s)	Cuba
2nd place, silver medalist(s)	Japan
3rd place, bronze medalist(s)	China
4	Brazil
5	South Korea
6	Soviet Union
7	Italy
8	Peru
9	Bulgaria
10	Czechoslovakia
11	Mexico
12	Australia
13	Austria
14	Finland
15	New Zealand

1985 FIVB Women's Junior World champions

Cuba
1st title

== Individual awards ==
- MVP: (Cuba) Mireya Luis
