= Peru women's national under-21 volleyball team =

Peru
- Association: Peruvian Volleyball Federation
- Confederation: CSV

Uniforms
Home	Away

FIVB U21 World Championship
- Appearances: 13 (First in 1977)
- Best result: (silver) Silver : (1981)

South America U20 Championship
- Appearances: 24 (First in 1972)
- Best result: (gold) Gold : (1980, 1982, 1986, 1988).

The Peru women's national under-20 volleyball team represents Peru in women's under-20 volleyball events, it is controlled and managed by the Peruvian Volleyball Federation that is a member of South American volleyball body Confederación Sudamericana de Voleibol (CSV) and the international volleyball body government the Fédération Internationale de Volleyball (FIVB).

== Results ==
=== FIVB U20 World Championship ===
Champions Runners up Third place Fourth place

FIVB U20 World Championship
Year	Round	Position	Pld	W	L	SW	SL	Squad
(Brazil) 1977		10th place						Squad
(Mexico) 1981	Final	Runners-Up						Squad
(Italy) 1985		8th place						Squad
(South Korea) 1987		6th place						Squad
(Peru) 1989	Semifinals	4th place						Squad
(Czechoslovakia) 1991		12th place						Squad
(Brazil) 1993	Semifinals	4th place						Squad
(Thailand) 1995		9th place						Squad
(Poland) 1997	Didn't Qualify							
(Canada) 1999	Didn't Qualify							
(Dominican Republic) 2001	Didn't Qualify							
(Thailand) 2003	Didn't Qualify							
(Turkey) 2005	Didn't Qualify							
(Thailand) 2007	Didn't Qualify							
(Mexico) 2009	Didn't Qualify							
(Peru) 2011		6th place						Squad
(Czech Republic) 2013		12th place						Squad
(Puerto Rico) 2015		6th place						Squad
(Mexico) 2017		14th place						Squad
(Mexico) 2019		12th place						Squad
(Netherlands) / (Belgium) 2021	Didn't Qualify							
Total	0 Titles	13/21						

=== South America U20 Championship ===
Champions Runners up Third place Fourth place

South America U20 Championship
Year	Round	Position	GP	MW	ML	SW	SL	Squad
(Brazil) 1972	Final	Runners-Up						Squad
(Argentina) 1974	Final	Runners-Up						Squad
(Bolivia) 1976	Final	Runners-Up						Squad
(Brazil) 1978	Final	Runners-Up						Squad
(Chile) 1980	Final	1st place						Squad
(Argentina) 1982	Final	1st place						Squad
(Peru) 1984	Final	Runners-Up						Squad
(Brazil) 1986	Final	1st place						Squad
(Venezuela) 1988	Final	1st place						Squad
(Argentina) 1990	Final	Runners-Up						Squad
(Bolivia) 1992	Semifinals	Third place						Squad
(Colombia) 1994	Semifinals	Third place						Squad
(Venezuela) 1996	Semifinals	Third place						Squad
(Argentina) 1998	Semifinals	Third place						Squad
(Colombia) 2000	Semifinals	4th place						Squad
(Bolivia) 2002	Semifinals	4th place						Squad
(Bolivia) 2004		5th place						Squad
(Venezuela) 2006	Semifinals	4th place						Squad
(Peru) 2008	Semifinals	Third place						Squad
(Colombia) 2010	Final	Runners-Up						Squad
(Peru) 2012	Final	Runners-Up						Squad
(Colombia) 2014	Final	Runners-Up						Squad
(Brazil) 2016	Semifinals	Third place						Squad
(Peru) 2018	Semifinals	Third place						Squad
(Peru) 2020	Cancelled							
Total	4 Titles	24/24	—	—	—	—	—	—

=== Pan-American U20 Cup ===
Champions Runners up Third place Fourth place

Pan-American U20 Cup
Year	Round	Position	Pld	W	L	SW	SL	Squad
(Peru) 2011	Final	1st place						Squad
(Cuba) 2013	Semifinals	4th place						Squad
(Dominican Republic) 2015	Did not Compete							
(Costa Rica) 2017		5th place						Squad
(Peru) 2019	Semifinals	Third place						Squad
Total	1 Title	4/5						

== Current squad ==
As of August 2026

- Coach: (Peru) Walter Lung
- Assistant Coach: (Peru) Elena Keldivekova

#	Player	Birth Date	Height	2025/26 Club	Position
2.	Camila Monge	27/04/2009	183	(Peru) Regatas Lima	Outside Hitter
6.	Ariana Vásquez	30/06/2009	179	(Peru) Club Atlético Atenea	Outside Hitter
8.	Fariuzza Mora	27/05/2008	183	(Peru) Alianza Lima	Middle Blocker
9.	Gianella Chanca	07/08/2009	177	(Peru) Rebaza Acosta	Opposite
10.	Shaddia Campos	18/04/2009	182	(Peru) Club Tupac Amaru	Middle Blocker
11.	Galilea Fuentes	22/12/2009	183	(Peru) Universidad de San Martín de Porres	Middle Blocker
12.	Camila Rebatta	18/03/2008	183	(Peru) Club Túpac Amaru	Setter
13.	Alexa Vega	24/10/2008	183	(Peru) Deportivo Géminis	Setter
14.	Arlym Condori	21/10/2008	182	(Peru) Club Túpac Amaru	Opposite
15.	Marely Zambrano	17/06/2008	163	(Peru) Olva Latino	Libero

=== Notable players ===
- Angela Leyva
- Maguilaura Frias
- Vivian Baella
- Daniela Uribe
- Andrea Urrutia
- Shiamara Almeida
- Rosa Valiente
- Cristina Cuba
- Violeta Delgado
