= Brazil women's national under-21 volleyball team =

Women's national volleyball team representing Brazil

Brazil
- Association: Confederação Brasileira de Voleibol
- Confederation: CSV
- Head coach: Cabral de Oliveira

Uniforms
Home	Away

FIVB U21 World Championship
- Appearances: 19 (First in 1977)
- Best result: (gold) Gold : (1987, 1989, 2001, 2003, 2005, 2007)

The Brazil women's national under-20 volleyball team represents Brazil in international women's volleyball competitions and friendly matches under the age 20 and it is ruled by the Brazilian Volleyball Federation that is a member of South American volleyball body Confederación Sudamericana de Voleibol (CSV) and the international volleyball body government the Fédération Internationale de Volleyball (FIVB).

== Results ==
=== U21 World Championship ===
Champions Runners up Third place Fourth place

World Championship record
Year	Round	Position	GP	MW	ML	SW	SL	Squad
(Brazil) 1977	Final Round	4th place	7	3	4	11	12	Squad
(Mexico) 1981	5th–8th places	6th place	6	3	3	12	11	Squad
(Italy) 1985	Semifinals	4th place	8	6	2	19	10	Squad
(South Korea) 1987	Final	Champions	7	6	1	19	6	Squad
(Peru) 1989	Final	Champions	8	8	0	24	5	Squad
(Czechoslovakia) 1991	Final	Runners up	7	5	2	15	8	Squad
(Brazil) 1993	5th–8th places	7th place	6	4	2	11	9	Squad
(Thailand) 1995	Final	Runners up	7	5	2	17	11	Squad
(Poland) 1997	Round of 16	9th place	4	2	2	8	6	Squad
(Canada) 1999	Final	Runners up	7	5	2	17	7	Squad
(Dominican Republic) 2001	Final	Champions	7	6	1	20	5	Squad
(Thailand) 2003	Final	Champions	7	7	0	21	6	Squad
(Turkey) 2005	Final	Champions	7	7	0	21	7	Squad
(Thailand) 2007	Final	Champions	7	7	0	21	3	Squad
(Mexico) 2009	Semifinals	3rd place	8	7	1	22	9	Squad
(Peru) 2011	Final	Runners up	8	7	1	22	7	Squad
(Czech Republic) 2013	Semifinals	3rd place	7	7	1	21	4	Squad
(Puerto Rico) 2015	Final	Runners up	8	6	2	20	10	Squad
(Mexico) 2017	5th–8th places	5th place	8	5	3	16	14	Squad
(Mexico) 2019	5th–8th places	6th place	8	4	4	16	13	Squad
2021	5th–8th places	7th place	8	3	5	11	15	Squad
2023	Semifinals	3rd place	8	5	3	19	10	Squad
2025	Semifinals	3rd place	9	7	2	22	7	
Total	6 Titles	24/24	—	—	—	—	—	—

=== U19 South America Championship ===
Champions Runners up Third place Fourth place

South America Championship record
Year	Round	Position	GP	MW	ML	SW	SL	Squad
(Brazil) 1972	Round robin	Champions	3	3	0	9	0	—
(Argentina) 1974	Round robin	Champions	6	6	0	18	0	—
(Bolivia) 1976	Round robin	Champions	5	5	0	15	0	—
(Brazil) 1978	Round robin	Champions	5	5	0	15	0	—
(Chile) 1980	Round robin	Runners up						
(Argentina) 1982	Round robin	Runners up						
(Peru) 1984	Final	Champions	5	5	0	15	0	—
(Brazil) 1986	Round robin	Runners up						
(Venezuela) 1988	Round robin	Runners up	5	4	1	14	3	—
(Argentina) 1990	Round robin	Champions						
(Bolivia) 1992	Round robin	Champions	5	5	0	15	0	—
(Colombia) 1994	Final	Champions	6	5	1	17	3	—
(Venezuela) 1996	Round robin	Champions						
(Argentina) 1998	Round robin	Champions						
(Colombia) 2000	Final	Champions	5	5	0	15	0	—
(Bolivia) 2002	Round robin	Champions	5	5	0	15	0	—
(Bolivia) 2004	Round robin	Champions	4	4	0	12	0	—
(Venezuela) 2006	Round robin	Champions	5	5	0	15	0	—
(Peru) 2008	Final	Champions	5	5	0	15	1	—
(Colombia) 2010	Final	Champions	4	4	0	12	0	—
(Peru) 2012	Final	Champions	5	5	0	15	2	—
(Colombia) 2014	Round robin	Champions	4	4	0	12	1	—
(Colombia) 2016	Round robin	Champions	5	5	0	15	1	—
(Peru) 2018	Final	Champions	5	4	1	13	6	—
Total	20 Titles	24/24	—	—	—	—	—	—

== Team ==
=== Current squad ===
The following is the Brazilian roster in the 2019 FIVB Volleyball Women's U20 World Championship.

Head coach: Cabral de Oliveira

No.	Name	Date of birth	Height	Weight	Spike	Block	2019 club
1	Rosely Nogueira	6 March 2001	1.75 m (5 ft 9 in)	67 kg (148 lb)	270 cm (110 in)	265 cm (104 in)	(Brazil) Varginha
3	Laura Kudiess	25 February 2001	1.88 m (6 ft 2 in)	72 kg (159 lb)	300 cm (120 in)	286 cm (113 in)	(Brazil) Minas Tênis Clube
4	Julia Kudiess	2 January 2003	1.89 m (6 ft 2 in)	76 kg (168 lb)	301 cm (119 in)	287 cm (113 in)	(Brazil) Minas Tênis Clube
6	Julia Bergmann	21 February 2001	1.96 m (6 ft 5 in)	78 kg (172 lb)	301 cm (119 in)	289 cm (114 in)	(Brazil) Abel Brusque
7	Daniela Seibt	17 April 2000	1.90 m (6 ft 3 in)	74 kg (163 lb)	295 cm (116 in)	290 cm (110 in)	(Brazil) A.D. Guaraciaba
8	Jheovana Sebastião	10 January 2001	1.94 m (6 ft 4 in)	90 kg (200 lb)	300 cm (120 in)	290 cm (110 in)	(Brazil) Hinode Barueri
9	Kisy Nascimento	28 January 2000	1.90 m (6 ft 3 in)	81 kg (179 lb)	303 cm (119 in)	290 cm (110 in)	(Brazil) A.A. São Caetano
10	Tainara Santos (C)	9 March 2000	1.90 m (6 ft 3 in)	81 kg (179 lb)	306 cm (120 in)	289 cm (114 in)	(Brazil) Hinode Barueri
11	Mayara Silva	26 April 2001	1.82 m (6 ft 0 in)	74 kg (163 lb)	293 cm (115 in)	284 cm (112 in)	(Brazil) Fluminense FC
13	Kenya Malachias	29 November 2000	1.85 m (6 ft 1 in)	73 kg (161 lb)	294 cm (116 in)	280 cm (110 in)	(Brazil) Bradesco
18	Ana Cristina de Souza	7 April 2004	1.92 m (6 ft 4 in)	79 kg (174 lb)	309 cm (122 in)	296 cm (117 in)	(Brazil) E.C. Pinheiros
20	Letícia Moura	8 May 2003	1.59 m (5 ft 3 in)	54 kg (119 lb)	272 cm (107 in)	252 cm (99 in)	(Brazil) Fluminense FC

== Former squads ==
=== U20 World Championship ===
- 1997 – 9th place
  Karine Guerra, Elisângela Oliveira, Jaline Prado de Oliveira, Erika Coimbra, Raquel Silva, Renata Schmutz, Flavia Assis, Lígia Centeno, Marina Daloca, Renata Carvalho, Vanessa Paterlini and Walewska Oliveira
- 1999 – Silver medal
  Cintia Leto, Fernanda Ferreira, Luciana Nascimento, Ana Paula Ferreira, Cibele Barboza, Erika Coimbra, Paula Pequeno, Thais Barbosa, Caroline Gattaz, Daniela Vieira, Ednéia Anjos and Ana Paula Larroza
- 2001 – Gold medal
  Juliana Costa, Paula Barros, Fabíola de Souza, Paula Pequeno, Ana Cristina Porto, Cecília Menezes, Veridiana Fonseca, Welissa Gonzaga, Juliana Saracuza, Jaqueline Carvalho, Andréia Laurence and Sheilla Castro
- 2003 – Gold medal
  Fernanda Gritzbach (c), Danielle Lins, Camila Adao, Thaisa Menezes, Fabiana Claudino, Fernanda Alves, Mari Mendes, Alessandra Sperb, Dayse Figueiredo, Joyce Silva, Joyce Victalino and Elymara Silva
- 2005 – Gold medal
  Regiane Bidias, Veronica Brito, Adenizia da Silva, Thaisa Menezes, Natalia Manfrin, Camila Torquette, Fernanda Rodrigues, Natasha Farinea, Michelle Pavao, Ana Tiemi Takagui (c), Suelen Pinto and Suelle Oliveira
- 2007 – Gold medal
  Erica Adachi, Camila Brait, Camila Monteiro, Betina Schmidt (c), Silvana Papini, Priscila Daroit, Natalia Pereira, Amanda Francisco, Reneta Maggioni, Maria Silva, Tandara Caixeta and Ingrid Felix
- 2009 – Bronze medal
  Thays Oliveira, Leticia Hage, Mara Leão, Natiele Gonçalves, Leticia Raymundi (c), Ana Beatriz Correa, Isadora Rodrigues, Roberta Ratzke, Leticia Pontes, Nathalia Daneliczin, Diana Silva and Glauciela Silva
- 2011 – Silver medal
  Sthefanie Paulino, Francynne Jacintho, Juliana Carrijo, Carolina Freitas, Isabela Paquiardi, Ana Beatriz Correa, Samara Almeida, Priscila Heldes (c), Gabriella Souza, Marjorie Correa, Sonaly Sidrão and Thais Saraiva
- 2013 – Bronze medal
  Naiane Rios, Maira Claro, Saraelen Lima, Gabriela Guimarães, Rosamaria Montibeller (c), Giovana Gasparini, Valquiria Dullius, Paula Mohr, Milka Silva, Domingas Araujo, Sara Silva and Daniela Guimarães
- 2015 – Silver medal
  Drussyla Costa, Lana Conceição (c), Ariane Pinto, Laiza Ferreira, Gabriela Candido, Gabriela Silva, Karoline Tormena, Lorenne Teixeira, Thais Oliveira, Lais Vasques, Lyara Medeiros and Maiara Basso
- 2017 – 5th place
  Diana Alecrim, Lorena Viezel, Glayce Vasconcelos, Nyeme Costa, Amanda Sehn, Karyna Malachias, Karina Souza, Jackeline Santos (c), Júlia Bergmann, Tainara Santos, Lorrayna da Silva and Júlia Moura
- 2019 – 6th place
  Rosely Nogueira, Laura Kudiess, Julia Kudiess, Julia Bergmann, Daniela Seibt, Jheovana Sebastião, Kisy Nascimento, Tainara Santos (c), Mayara Silva, Kenya Malachias, Ana Cristina de Souza and Leticia Moura

== See also ==
- Brazil men's national under-21 volleyball team
- Brazil women's national volleyball team
- Brazil women's national under-23 volleyball team
- Brazil women's national under-18 volleyball team
