= 1989 FIVB Volleyball Women's U20 World Championship =

1989 FIVB Women's U20 World Championship
Tournament details
- Host country: Peru
- Dates: August 3–13, 1989
- Teams: 16
- Venues: 3 (in Lima, Trujillo and Arequipa host cities)

Final positions
- Champions: Brazil (2nd title)

The 1989 FIVB Women's U20 World Championship was held in Lima, Trujillo and Arequipa, Peru from August 3 to 13, 1989. 16 teams participated in the tournament.

== Qualification process ==
| Confederation | Method of Qualification | Venue | Date | Vacancies | Qualified |
|---|---|---|---|---|---|
| FIVB | Host | | | 1 | Peru |
| NORCECA | NORCECA Election | | | 4 | Cuba; Canada; Puerto Rico; Mexico |
| CSV | 1988 South American Junior Championship | Caracas, Venezuela | August 20 – 28, 1988 | 4 | Brazil; Argentina; Venezuela; Colombia |
| CEV | 1988 European Junior Championship | Bormio, Italy | July 23 – 30, 1988 | 2 | Soviet Union; Italy |
| AVC | 1988 Asian Junior Championship | Jakarta, Indonesia | August 14 – 22, 1988 | 4 | Japan; China; South Korea; Chinese Taipei * |
| FIVB | Wild card | | | 1 | Spain |
| Total | | | | 16 | |

- * Chinese Taipei replaced Indonesia.

== Pools composition ==
| Pool A | Pool B | Pool C | Pool D |
|---|---|---|---|
| Peru; China; Italy; Mexico | Brazil; Chinese Taipei; Cuba; Venezuela | Canada; Colombia; Japan; Spain | Argentina; South Korea; Puerto Rico; Soviet Union |

| Pool E | | Pool F | | 13th–16th | |
|---|---|---|---|---|---|
| 1A | Peru | 1B | Brazil | 4A | Mexico |
| 1C | Japan | 1D | South Korea | 4B | Venezuela |
| 2A | China | 2B | Cuba | 4C | Spain |
| 2C | Canada | 2D | Soviet Union | 4D | Puerto Rico |
| 3A | Italy | 3B | Chinese Taipei | | |
| 3C | Colombia | 3D | Argentina | | |

== Preliminary round ==
=== Pool A ===
| Pos | Team | Pld | W | L | Pts | SW | SL | SR | SPW | SPL | SPR | Qualification |
|---|---|---|---|---|---|---|---|---|---|---|---|---|
| 1 | Peru | 3 | 3 | 0 | 6 | 9 | 3 | 3.000 | 168 | 117 | 1.436 | Second round |
| 2 | China | 3 | 2 | 1 | 5 | 7 | 4 | 1.750 | 148 | 107 | 1.383 | Second round |
| 3 | Italy | 3 | 1 | 2 | 4 | 6 | 6 | 1.000 | 148 | 147 | 1.007 | Second round |
| 4 | Mexico | 3 | 0 | 3 | 3 | 0 | 9 | 0.000 | 42 | 135 | 0.311 | 13th place playoff |

| Date | | Score | | Set 1 | Set 2 | Set 3 | Set 4 | Set 5 | Total |
|---|---|---|---|---|---|---|---|---|---|
| 3 Aug | China | 3–0 | Mexico | 15–6 | 15–2 | 15–0 | | | 45–8 |
| 3 Aug | Peru | 3–2 | Italy | 9–15 | 15–13 | 15–4 | 14–16 | 15–11 | 68–59 |
| 4 Aug | Peru | 3–0 | Mexico | 15–7 | 15–5 | 15–2 | | | 45–14 |
| 4 Aug | China | 3–1 | Italy | 16–14 | 15–9 | 13–15 | 15–6 | | 59–44 |
| 5 Aug | Italy | 3–0 | Mexico | 15–8 | 15–11 | 15–1 | | | 45–20 |
| 5 Aug | Peru | 3–1 | China | 15–9 | 15–8 | 10–15 | 15–12 | | 55–44 |

=== Pool B ===
| Pos | Team | Pld | W | L | Pts | SW | SL | SR | SPW | SPL | SPR | Qualification |
|---|---|---|---|---|---|---|---|---|---|---|---|---|
| 1 | Brazil | 3 | 3 | 0 | 6 | 9 | 1 | 9.000 | 148 | 84 | 1.762 | Second round |
| 2 | Cuba | 3 | 2 | 1 | 5 | 7 | 3 | 2.333 | 141 | 102 | 1.382 | Second round |
| 3 | Chinese Taipei | 3 | 1 | 2 | 4 | 3 | 6 | 0.500 | 86 | 121 | 0.711 | Second round |
| 4 | Venezuela | 3 | 0 | 3 | 3 | 0 | 9 | 0.000 | 69 | 137 | 0.504 | 13th place playoff |

| Date | | Score | | Set 1 | Set 2 | Set 3 | Set 4 | Set 5 | Total |
|---|---|---|---|---|---|---|---|---|---|
| 3 Aug | Chinese Taipei | 3–0 | Venezuela | 17–15 | 15–6 | 15–10 | | | 47–31 |
| 3 Aug | Brazil | 3–1 | Cuba | 15–13 | 11–15 | 17–15 | 15–8 | | 58–51 |
| 4 Aug | Brazil | 3–0 | Venezuela | 15–5 | 15–7 | 15–7 | | | 45–19 |
| 4 Aug | Cuba | 3–0 | Chinese Taipei | 15–9 | 15–7 | 15–9 | | | 45–25 |
| 5 Aug | Brazil | 3–0 | Chinese Taipei | 15–9 | 15–4 | 15–1 | | | 45–14 |
| 5 Aug | Cuba | 3–0 | Venezuela | 15–6 | 15–7 | 15–6 | | | 45–19 |

=== Pool C ===
| Pos | Team | Pld | W | L | Pts | SW | SL | SR | SPW | SPL | SPR | Qualification |
|---|---|---|---|---|---|---|---|---|---|---|---|---|
| 1 | Japan | 3 | 3 | 0 | 6 | 9 | 0 | MAX | 135 | 28 | 4.821 | Second round |
| 2 | Canada | 3 | 2 | 1 | 5 | 6 | 3 | 2.000 | 105 | 93 | 1.129 | Second round |
| 3 | Colombia | 3 | 1 | 2 | 4 | 3 | 8 | 0.375 | 100 | 151 | 0.662 | Second round |
| 4 | Spain | 3 | 0 | 3 | 3 | 2 | 9 | 0.222 | 85 | 153 | 0.556 | 13th place playoff |

| Date | | Score | | Set 1 | Set 2 | Set 3 | Set 4 | Set 5 | Total |
|---|---|---|---|---|---|---|---|---|---|
| 3 Aug | Canada | 3–0 | Spain | 15–5 | 15–11 | 15–5 | | | 45–21 |
| 3 Aug | Japan | 3–0 | Colombia | 15–2 | 15–3 | 15–5 | | | 45–10 |
| 4 Aug | Colombia | 3–2 | Spain | 17–15 | 5–15 | 15–10 | 11–15 | 15–6 | 63–61 |
| 4 Aug | Japan | 3–0 | Canada | 15–3 | 15–7 | 15–5 | | | 45–15 |
| 5 Aug | Japan | 3–0 | Spain | 15–0 | 15–2 | 15–1 | | | 45–3 |
| 5 Aug | Canada | 3–0 | Colombia | 15–11 | 15–10 | 15–6 | | | 45–27 |

=== Pool D ===
| Pos | Team | Pld | W | L | Pts | SW | SL | SR | SPW | SPL | SPR | Qualification |
|---|---|---|---|---|---|---|---|---|---|---|---|---|
| 1 | South Korea | 3 | 3 | 0 | 6 | 9 | 1 | 9.000 | 142 | 79 | 1.797 | Second round |
| 2 | Soviet Union | 3 | 2 | 1 | 5 | 7 | 4 | 1.750 | 140 | 94 | 1.489 | Second round |
| 3 | Argentina | 3 | 1 | 2 | 4 | 3 | 6 | 0.500 | 101 | 117 | 0.863 | Second round |
| 4 | Puerto Rico | 3 | 0 | 3 | 3 | 0 | 9 | 0.000 | 42 | 135 | 0.311 | 13th place playoff |

| Date | | Score | | Set 1 | Set 2 | Set 3 | Set 4 | Set 5 | Total |
|---|---|---|---|---|---|---|---|---|---|
| 3 Aug | South Korea | 3–0 | Argentina | 15–12 | 15–9 | 15–4 | | | 45–25 |
| 3 Aug | Soviet Union | 3–0 | Puerto Rico | 15–1 | 15–2 | 15–8 | | | 45–11 |
| 4 Aug | Soviet Union | 3–0 | Argentina | 15–8 | 15–12 | 15–11 | | | 45–31 |
| 4 Aug | South Korea | 3–0 | Puerto Rico | 15–1 | 15–2 | 15–1 | | | 45–4 |
| 5 Aug | Argentina | 3–0 | Puerto Rico | 15–12 | 15–6 | 15–9 | | | 45–27 |
| 5 Aug | South Korea | 3–1 | Soviet Union | 17–16 | 15–11 | 5–15 | 15–8 | | 52–50 |

== Second round ==
=== Pool E ===
| Pos | Team | Pld | W | L | Pts | SW | SL | SR | SPW | SPL | SPR | Qualification |
|---|---|---|---|---|---|---|---|---|---|---|---|---|
| 1 | Japan | 5 | 5 | 0 | 10 | 15 | 1 | 15.000 | 232 | 109 | 2.128 | Semifinals |
| 2 | Peru | 5 | 4 | 1 | 9 | 12 | 8 | 1.500 | 262 | 202 | 1.297 | Semifinals |
| 3 | China | 5 | 3 | 2 | 8 | 11 | 7 | 1.571 | 230 | 166 | 1.386 | 5th place playoff |
| 4 | Italy | 5 | 2 | 3 | 7 | 9 | 9 | 1.000 | 214 | 198 | 1.081 | 5th place playoff |
| 5 | Canada | 5 | 1 | 4 | 6 | 5 | 12 | 0.417 | 126 | 230 | 0.548 | 9th place playoff |
| 6 | Colombia | 5 | 0 | 5 | 5 | 0 | 15 | 0.000 | 66 | 225 | 0.293 | 9th place playoff |

| Date | | Score | | Set 1 | Set 2 | Set 3 | Set 4 | Set 5 | Total |
|---|---|---|---|---|---|---|---|---|---|
| 7 Aug | Peru | 3–0 | Colombia | 15–1 | 15–6 | 15–1 | | | 45–8 |
| 7 Aug | China | 3–0 | Canada | 15–1 | 15–5 | 15–1 | | | 45–7 |
| 7 Aug | Japan | 3–0 | Italy | 15–9 | 15–10 | 15–2 | | | 45–21 |
| 8 Aug | Japan | 3–1 | China | 7–15 | 15–7 | 15–7 | 15–8 | | 52–37 |
| 8 Aug | Italy | 3–0 | Colombia | 15–0 | 15–4 | 15–9 | | | 45–13 |
| 8 Aug | Peru | 3–2 | Canada | 11–15 | 15–4 | 15–11 | 12–15 | 15–1 | 68–46 |
| 9 Aug | Japan | 3–0 | Peru | 15–7 | 15–9 | 15–10 | | | 45–26 |
| 9 Aug | China | 3–0 | Colombia | 15–1 | 15–4 | 15–3 | | | 45–8 |
| 9 Aug | Italy | 3–0 | Canada | 15–3 | 15–5 | 15–5 | | | 45–13 |

=== Pool F ===
| Pos | Team | Pld | W | L | Pts | SW | SL | SR | SPW | SPL | SPR | Qualification |
|---|---|---|---|---|---|---|---|---|---|---|---|---|
| 1 | Brazil | 5 | 5 | 0 | 10 | 15 | 3 | 5.000 | 263 | 144 | 1.826 | Semifinals |
| 2 | Cuba | 5 | 4 | 1 | 9 | 13 | 5 | 2.600 | 254 | 183 | 1.388 | Semifinals |
| 3 | South Korea | 5 | 3 | 2 | 8 | 10 | 7 | 1.429 | 204 | 198 | 1.030 | 5th place playoff |
| 4 | Chinese Taipei | 5 | 2 | 3 | 7 | 6 | 11 | 0.545 | 165 | 211 | 0.782 | 5th place playoff |
| 5 | Soviet Union | 5 | 1 | 4 | 6 | 8 | 12 | 0.667 | 228 | 264 | 0.864 | 9th place playoff |
| 6 | Argentina | 5 | 0 | 5 | 5 | 1 | 15 | 0.067 | 116 | 230 | 0.504 | 9th place playoff |

| Date | | Score | | Set 1 | Set 2 | Set 3 | Set 4 | Set 5 | Total |
|---|---|---|---|---|---|---|---|---|---|
| 7 Aug | Brazil | 3–0 | Argentina | 15–4 | 15–3 | 15–2 | | | 45–9 |
| 7 Aug | Cuba | 3–2 | Soviet Union | 13–15 | 15–12 | 15–5 | 10–15 | 15–11 | 68–58 |
| 7 Aug | South Korea | 3–0 | Chinese Taipei | 15–8 | 15–2 | 15–11 | | | 45–21 |
| 8 Aug | Chinese Taipei | 3–1 | Argentina | 15–9 | 15–3 | 5–15 | 15–12 | | 50–39 |
| 8 Aug | Brazil | 3–1 | Soviet Union | 13–15 | 15–8 | 15–6 | 15–9 | | 58–38 |
| 8 Aug | Cuba | 3–0 | South Korea | 15–12 | 15–12 | 15–6 | | | 45–30 |
| 9 Aug | Cuba | 3–0 | Argentina | 15–4 | 15–6 | 15–2 | | | 45–12 |
| 9 Aug | Brazil | 3–1 | South Korea | 12–15 | 15–3 | 15–6 | 15–8 | | 57–32 |
| 9 Aug | Chinese Taipei | 3–1 | Soviet Union | 10–15 | 15–8 | 15–9 | 15–5 | | 55–37 |

=== 13th–16th places ===
| Pos | Team | Pld | W | L | Pts | SW | SL | SR | SPW | SPL | SPR |
|---|---|---|---|---|---|---|---|---|---|---|---|
| 13 | Venezuela | 3 | 3 | 0 | 6 | 9 | 1 | 9.000 | 102 | 81 | 1.259 |
| 14 | Spain | 3 | 2 | 1 | 5 | 7 | 4 | 1.750 | 99 | 78 | 1.269 |
| 15 | Puerto Rico | 3 | 1 | 2 | 4 | 4 | 8 | 0.500 | 48 | 90 | 0.533 |
| 16 | Mexico | 3 | 0 | 3 | 3 | 2 | 9 | 0.222 | 48 | 90 | 0.533 |

| Date | | Score | | Set 1 | Set 2 | Set 3 | Set 4 | Set 5 | Total |
|---|---|---|---|---|---|---|---|---|---|
| 7 Aug | Puerto Rico | 3–2 | Mexico | 15–4 | 5–15 | 15–9 | 11–15 | 15–13 | 61–56 |
| 7 Aug | Venezuela | 3–1 | Spain | 16–14 | 13–15 | 15–7 | 18–16 | | 62–52 |
| 8 Aug | Spain | 3–1 | Puerto Rico | 15–11 | 13–15 | 15–8 | 15–8 | | 58–42 |
| 8 Aug | Venezuela | 3–0 | Mexico | 15–5 | 15–4 | 15–12 | | | 45–21 |
| 9 Aug | Spain | 3–0 | Mexico | 15–6 | 15–12 | 15–10 | | | 45–28 |
| 9 Aug | Venezuela | 3–0 | Puerto Rico | 15–10 | 15–9 | 16–14 | | | 46–33 |

== Final round ==
=== 9th–12th places ===
9th–12th places
Soviet Union | 3
Colombia | 0
Argentina | 3
Canada | 1

9th place
Soviet Union | 3
Argentina | 0
11th place
Colombia | 0
Canada | 3

=== Classification 9th and 12th ===
| Date | Game | | |
|---|---|---|---|
| 12 Aug | Soviet Union | 3–0 | Colombia |
| 12 Aug | Argentina | 3–1 | Canada |

=== Classification 11th ===
| Date | Game | | |
|---|---|---|---|
| 13 Aug | Canada | 3–0 | Colombia |

=== Classification 9th ===
| Date | Game | | |
|---|---|---|---|
| 13 Aug | Soviet Union | 3–0 | Argentina |

=== 5th–8th places ===
5th–8th places
China | 3
Chinese Taipei | 0
South Korea | 3
Italy | 0

5th place
China | 3
South Korea | 1
7th place
Chinese Taipei | 0
Italy | 3

=== Classification 5th and 8th ===
| Date | Game | | |
|---|---|---|---|
| 12 Aug | China | 3–0 | Chinese Taipei |
| 12 Aug | South Korea | 3–0 | Italy |

=== Classification 7th ===
| Date | Game | | |
|---|---|---|---|
| 13 Aug | Italy | 3–0 | Chinese Taipei |

=== Classification 5th ===
| Date | Game | | |
|---|---|---|---|
| 13 Aug | China | 3–1 | South Korea |

=== Championship round ===
Semifinals
Brazil | 3
Peru | 0
Cuba | 3
Japan | 0

Final
Brazil | 3
Cuba | 2
Third place
Peru | 0
Japan | 3

=== Semifinals ===
| Date | | Score | | Set 1 | Set 2 | Set 3 | Set 4 | Set 5 | Total |
|---|---|---|---|---|---|---|---|---|---|
| 12 Aug | Brazil | 3–0 | Peru | 15–4 | 15–3 | 15–6 | | | 45–13 |
| 12 Aug | Cuba | 3–0 | Japan | 15–12 | 15–9 | 15–2 | | | 45–23 |

=== Bronze medal match ===
| Date | | Score | | Set 1 | Set 2 | Set 3 | Set 4 | Set 5 | Total |
|---|---|---|---|---|---|---|---|---|---|
| 13 Aug | Japan | 3–0 | Peru | 15–7 | 15–12 | 15–10 | | | 45–29 |

=== Gold medal match ===
| Date | | Score | | Set 1 | Set 2 | Set 3 | Set 4 | Set 5 | Total |
|---|---|---|---|---|---|---|---|---|---|
| 13 Aug | Brazil | 3–2 | Cuba | 15–4 | 13–15 | 12–15 | 15–1 | 15–11 | 70–46 |

== Final standing ==
| Rank | Team |
|---|---|
| 1st place, gold medalist(s) | Brazil |
| 2nd place, silver medalist(s) | Cuba |
| 3rd place, bronze medalist(s) | Japan |
| 4 | Peru |
| 5 | China |
| 6 | South Korea |
| 7 | Italy |
| 8 | Chinese Taipei |
| 9 | Soviet Union |
| 10 | Argentina |
| 11 | Canada |
| 12 | Colombia |
| 13 | Venezuela |
| 14 | Spain |
| 15 | Puerto Rico |
| 16 | Mexico |

1989 FIVB Women's Junior World champions

Brazil
2nd title

12–woman Roster
Fernanda Venturini, Kerly Santos, Márcia Fu, Ana Flávia Sanglard, Fátima dos Santos, Ericleia Bodziak, Simone Storm, Ricarda Lima, Ana Lima, Andreia Marras, Hilma Caldeira and Virna Dias
Head coach
Marco Aurelio Motta

== Individual awards ==
- Best spiker: (Peru) Paola Paz Soldan
- Best setter: (Brazil) Fernanda Venturini
- Best blocker: (Brazil) Fátima dos Santos
- Best server: (Brazil) Márcia Fu
