= 1977 FIVB Volleyball Women's U20 World Championship =

1977 FIVB Women's U20 World Championship
Tournament details
- Host country: Brazil
- Dates: September 5–14, 1977
- Teams: 14
- Venues: 4 (in São Paulo, Rio de Janeiro, Belo Horizonte and Brasília host cities)

Final positions
- Champions: South Korea (1st title)

The 1977 FIVB Women's U20 World Championship was held in Brazil from September 5 to 14, 1977. 14 teams participated in the tournament. It was the first junior world championships ever held.

== Qualification ==
A total of 14 teams qualified for the final tournament. In addition to Brazil, who qualified automatically as the hosts, another 13 teams qualified via four separate continental tournament.

Means of qualification	Vacancies	Qualified
Host country	1	Brazil
Asian Volleyball Confederation	3	China
Asian Volleyball Confederation	3	South Korea
Asian Volleyball Confederation	3	Japan
NORCECA	4	United States
NORCECA	4	Mexico
NORCECA	4	Canada
NORCECA	4	Costa Rica
1977 European Championship	1	Soviet Union
1976 South American Championship	3	Peru
1976 South American Championship	3	Argentina
1976 South American Championship	3	Bolivia
Wild card	2	Spain
Wild card	2	Paraguay
Total	14	

== Pools composition ==
=== First round ===
Pool A	Pool B	Pool C	Pool D
South Korea; United States; Peru; Paraguay	Japan; Canada; Argentina; Spain	China; Mexico; Soviet Union; Bolivia	Brazil; Costa Rica; ~~Turkey~~ * ~~Saudi Arabia~~ *

- Turkey and Saudi Arabia declined to participate.

=== Second round ===
Pool E	Pool F	Pool G	Pool H
China; Japan; United States; Costa Rica	South Korea; Brazil; Canada; Mexico	Peru; Bolivia; Spain	Soviet Union; Argentina; Paraguay

== Preliminary round ==
=== Pool A ===
Pos	Team	Pld	W	L	Pts	SW	SL	SR	SPW	SPL	SPR	Qualification
1	South Korea	3	3	0	6	9	0	MAX	135	36	3.750	Pool E or Pool F
2	United States	3	2	1	5	6	5	1.200	141	115	1.226	Pool E or Pool F
3	Peru	3	1	2	4	5	6	0.833	121	134	0.903	Pool G or Pool H
4	Paraguay	3	0	3	3	0	9	0.000	23	135	0.170	Pool G or Pool H

Date		Score		Set 1	Set 2	Set 3	Set 4	Set 5	Total
5 Sep	United States	3–0	Paraguay	15–5	15–4	15–1			45–10
5 Sep	South Korea	3–0	Peru	15–2	15–9	15–5			45–16
6 Sep	South Korea	3–0	Paraguay	15–0	15–1	15–0			45–1
6 Sep	United States	3–2	Peru	22–20	15–10	15–6	10–15	15–9	77–60
7 Sep	Peru	3–0	Paraguay	15–4	15–1	15–7			45–12
7 Sep	South Korea	3–0	United States	15–3	15–10	15–6			45–19

=== Pool B ===
Pos	Team	Pld	W	L	Pts	SW	SL	SR	SPW	SPL	SPR	Qualification
1	Japan	3	3	0	6	9	0	MAX	135	41	3.293	Pool E or Pool F
2	Canada	3	2	1	5	6	5	1.200	130	113	1.150	Pool E or Pool F
3	Argentina	3	1	2	4	5	7	0.714	120	143	0.839	Pool G or Pool H
4	Spain	3	0	3	3	1	9	0.111	67	145	0.462	Pool G or Pool H

Date		Score		Set 1	Set 2	Set 3	Set 4	Set 5	Total
5 Sep	Canada	3–2	Argentina	8–15	15–12	15–6	7–15	15–6	60–54
5 Sep	Japan	3–0	Spain	15–1	15–2	15–2			45–5
6 Sep	Canada	3–0	Spain	15–5	15–5	16–14			46–24
6 Sep	Japan	3–0	Argentina	15–6	15–6	15–0			45–12
7 Sep	Argentina	3–1	Spain	15–11	15–10	9–15	15–2		54–38
7 Sep	Japan	3–0	Canada	15–5	15–6	15–13			45–24

=== Pool C ===
Pos	Team	Pld	W	L	Pts	SW	SL	SR	SPW	SPL	SPR	Qualification
1	China	3	3	0	6	9	0	MAX	137	63	2.175	Pool E or Pool F
2	Mexico	3	2	1	5	6	5	1.200	110	127	0.866	Pool E or Pool F
3	Soviet Union	3	1	2	4	5	6	0.833	140	125	1.120	Pool G or Pool H
4	Bolivia	3	0	3	3	0	9	0.000	63	135	0.467	Pool G or Pool H

Date		Score		Set 1	Set 2	Set 3	Set 4	Set 5	Total
5 Sep	China	3–0	Bolivia	15–3	15–7	15–1			45–11
5 Sep	Mexico	3–2	Soviet Union	15–10	6–15	9–15	15–5	15–12	51–57
6 Sep	Soviet Union	3–0	Bolivia	15–6	15–10	15–11			45–27
6 Sep	China	3–0	Mexico	15–6	15–6	15–2			45–14
7 Sep	Mexico	3–0	Bolivia	15–8	15–5	15–12			45–25
7 Sep	China	3–0	Soviet Union	17–15	15–11	15–12			47–38

=== Pool D ===
Pos	Team	Pld	W	L	Pts	SW	SL	SR	SPW	SPL	SPR	Qualification
1	Brazil	1	1	0	2	3	0	MAX	45	12	3.750	Pool E or Pool F
2	Costa Rica	1	0	1	1	0	3	0.000	12	45	0.267	Pool E or Pool F

Date		Score		Set 1	Set 2	Set 3	Set 4	Set 5	Total
6 Sep	Brazil	3–0	Costa Rica	15–2	15–6	15–4			45–12

== Second round ==
=== Pool E (1st–8th) ===
Pos	Team	Pld	W	L	Pts	SW	SL	SR	SPW	SPL	SPR	Qualification
1	China	3	3	0	6	9	1	9.000	146	55	2.655	1st–4th playoff
2	Japan	3	2	1	5	7	3	2.333	134	73	1.836	1st–4th playoff
3	United States	3	1	2	4	3	6	0.500	75	92	0.815	5th–8th playoff
4	Costa Rica	3	0	3	3	0	9	0.000	12	135	0.089	5th–8th playoff

Date		Score		Set 1	Set 2	Set 3	Set 4	Set 5	Total
9 Sep	Japan	3–0	Costa Rica	15–2	15–1	15–4			45–7
9 Sep	China	3–0	United States	15–2	15–4	15–2			45–8
10 Sep	China	3–0	Costa Rica	15–1	15–1	15–1			45–3
10 Sep	Japan	3–0	United States	15–4	15–11	15–7			45–22
11 Sep	United States	3–0	Costa Rica	15–0	15–0	15–2			45–2
11 Sep	China	3–1	Japan	15–13	10–15	15–2	16–14		56–44

=== Pool F (1st–8th) ===
Pos	Team	Pld	W	L	Pts	SW	SL	SR	SPW	SPL	SPR	Qualification
1	South Korea	3	3	0	6	9	2	4.500	159	78	2.038	1st–4th playoff
2	Brazil	3	2	1	5	8	3	2.667	144	115	1.252	1st–4th playoff
3	Canada	3	1	2	4	3	6	0.500	76	115	0.661	5th–8th playoff
4	Mexico	3	0	3	3	0	9	0.000	65	136	0.478	5th–8th playoff

Date		Score		Set 1	Set 2	Set 3	Set 4	Set 5	Total
9 Sep	South Korea	3–0	Mexico	15–6	15–4	15–3			45–13
9 Sep	Brazil	3–0	Canada	15–13	15–1	15–5			45–19
10 Sep	South Korea	3–0	Canada	15–8	15–1	15–2			45–11
10 Sep	Brazil	3–0	Mexico	15–6	15–12	15–9			45–27
11 Sep	Canada	3–0	Mexico	16–14	15–4	15–7			46–25
11 Sep	South Korea	3–2	Brazil	12–15	12–15	15–8	15–5	15–11	69–54

=== Pool G (9th–16th) ===
Pos	Team	Pld	W	L	Pts	SW	SL	SR	SPW	SPL	SPR	Qualification
1	Peru	2	2	0	4	6	0	MAX	90	15	6.000	9th–12th playoff
2	Bolivia	2	1	1	3	3	4	0.750	59	78	0.756	9th–12th playoff
3	Spain	2	0	2	2	1	6	0.167	40	96	0.417	13th–14th playoff

Date		Score		Set 1	Set 2	Set 3	Set 4	Set 5	Total
9 Sep	Peru	3–0	Bolivia	15–2	15–5	15–1			45–8
10 Sep	Bolivia	3–1	Spain	15–7	15–6	6–15	15–5		51–33
11 Sep	Peru	3–0	Spain	15–1	15–3	15–3			45–7

=== Pool H (9th–16th) ===
Pos	Team	Pld	W	L	Pts	SW	SL	SR	SPW	SPL	SPR	Qualification
1	Soviet Union	2	2	0	4	6	0	MAX	90	20	4.500	9th–12th playoff
2	Argentina	2	1	1	3	3	4	0.750	62	71	0.873	9th–12th playoff
3	Paraguay	2	0	2	2	1	6	0.167	30	90	0.333	13th–14th playoff

Date		Score		Set 1	Set 2	Set 3	Set 4	Set 5	Total
9 Sep	Soviet Union	3–0	Paraguay	15–0	15–3	15–1			45–4
10 Sep	Argentina	3–0	Paraguay	16–14	15–6	15–6			46–26
11 Sep	Soviet Union	3–0	Argentina	15–3	15–5	15–8			45–16

== Final round ==
=== 13th–14th ===
Pos	Team	Pld	W	L	Pts	SW	SL	SR	SPW	SPL	SPR
13	Paraguay	1	1	0	2	3	2	1.500	69	65	1.062
14	Spain	1	0	1	1	2	3	0.667	65	69	0.942

Date		Score		Set 1	Set 2	Set 3	Set 4	Set 5	Total
15 Sep	Paraguay	3–2	Spain	15–12	10–15	15–8	12–15	17–15	69–65

=== 9th–12th ===
Pos	Team	Pld	W	L	Pts	SW	SL	SR	SPW	SPL	SPR
9	Soviet Union	3	3	0	6	9	2	4.500	155	73	2.123
10	Peru	3	2	1	5	8	3	2.667	151	90	1.678
11	Argentina	3	1	2	4	3	8	0.375	89	154	0.578
12	Bolivia	3	0	3	3	2	9	0.222	79	152	0.520

Date		Score		Set 1	Set 2	Set 3	Set 4	Set 5	Total
14 Sep	Peru	3–0	Argentina	15–5	15–7	15–4			45–16
14 Sep	Soviet Union	3–0	Bolivia	15–2	15–2	15–2			45–6
15 Sep	Peru	3–0	Bolivia	15–1	15–1	15–7			45–9
15 Sep	Soviet Union	3–0	Argentina	15–2	15–2	15–7			45–11
16 Sep	Argentina	3–2	Bolivia	15–9	9–15	15–11	8–15	15–13	62–64
16 Sep	Soviet Union	3–2	Peru	7–15	15–7	15–13	13–15	15–6	65–56

=== 5th–8th ===
Pos	Team	Pld	W	L	Pts	SW	SL	SR	SPW	SPL	SPR
5	United States	3	3	0	6	9	0	MAX	136	72	1.889
6	Mexico	3	2	1	5	6	0	MAX	122	94	1.298
7	Canada	3	1	2	4	4	6	0.667	113	113	1.000
8	Costa Rica	3	0	3	3	2	9	0.222	43	135	0.319

Date		Score		Set 1	Set 2	Set 3	Set 4	Set 5	Total
14 Sep	United States	3–0	Costa Rica	15–3	15–9	15–2			45–14
14 Sep	Mexico	3–1	Canada	3–15	15–5	15–10	15–9		48–39
15 Sep	Canada	3–0	Costa Rica	15–7	15–6	15–6			45–19
15 Sep	United States	3–0	Mexico	15–10	15–7	15–12			45–29
16 Sep	Mexico	3–0	Costa Rica	15–4	15–3	15–3			45–10
16 Sep	United States	3–0	Canada	15–8	16–14	15–7			46–29

=== 1st–4th ===
Pos	Team	Pld	W	L	Pts	SW	SL	SR	SPW	SPL	SPR
1	South Korea	3	2	1	5	7	3	2.333	150	102	1.471
2	China	3	2	1	5	8	4	2.000	166	147	1.129
3	Japan	3	2	1	5	6	5	1.200	130	131	0.992
4	Brazil	3	0	3	3	0	9	0.000	60	135	0.444

Date		Score		Set 1	Set 2	Set 3	Set 4	Set 5	Total
14 Sep	China	3–1	South Korea	11–15	17–15	17–15	17–15		62–60
14 Sep	Japan	3–0	Brazil	15–6	15–3	15–9			45–18
15 Sep	Japan	3–2	China	12–15	11–15	15–8	15–11	15–10	68–59
15 Sep	South Korea	3–0	Brazil	15–1	15–9	15–13			45–23
16 Sep	South Korea	3–0	Japan	15–4	15–10	15–3			45–17
16 Sep	China	3–0	Brazil	15–5	15–5	15–9			45–19

== Final standing ==
Rank	Team
1st place, gold medalist(s)	South Korea
2nd place, silver medalist(s)	China
3rd place, bronze medalist(s)	Japan
4	Brazil
5	United States
6	Mexico
7	Canada
8	Costa Rica
9	Soviet Union
10	Peru
11	Argentina
12	Bolivia
13	Paraguay
14	Spain

1977 FIVB Women's Junior World champions

South Korea
1st title

12–woman Roster
Shin Ik, Kim Hee, Hoang Kiung, Yang Tok, Dim Young Sook, Dim Bok, Kim Eeuk, Park Sok, Aum Soon, Kyung Sok
