= Yasmine Abderrahim =

Algerian volleyball player (born 1999)

Personal information
- Nationality: Algeria
- Born: 16 April 1999 (age 27) Béjaïa, Algeria
- Height: 1.82 m (6 ft 0 in)
- Weight: 61 kg (134 lb)
- Spike: 295 cm (116 in)
- Block: 280 cm (110 in)

Volleyball information
- Position: Outside hitter
- Current club: Olympiacos SF Piraeus
- Number: 18 (Club)

Career
- Years: Team
- 2016–2018 2018–2021 2021–2024 2024–: (Algeria) ASW Bejaia (France) Istres Provence Volley (France) Pays d'Aix Venelles Volley-Ball (Greece) Olympiacos Piraeus

National team
- Years: Team
- –: Algeria
Medal record
Women's volleyball
Representing Algeria
Girls' U-18 Africa Championship
Bronze medal – third place	2014 Egypt	Team
Women's U-20 Africa Championship
Silver medal – second place	2013 Nigeria	Team
Silver medal – second place	2015 Egypt	Team
Volleyball tournament at Arab Games
Gold medal – first place	2023 Algeria	Team
- Updated on 5 May 2025

Yasmine Abderrahim (Arabic: ياسمين عبد الرحيم; born 16 April 1999, in Béjaïa) is an Algerian international volleyball player with the Algerian national team, who plays as an outside hitter. On club level she plays for Olympiacos Piraeus.

== Career ==
Yasmine Abderrahim began her professional volleyball career in 2016 at the age of 17 with Algerian club ASW Bejaia, located at the city of the same name, with which she won the silver medal in the 2018 Algerian Cup. That year she moved to France, where she remained for six years. For the first three years she played for Istres Provence and for the next three she signed with Pays d'Aix Venelles. In the 2018–19 season, she played in the Elite league (2nd level). Her team was a finalist in the French Amateur Cup and was also promoted to Ligue A. The following season the French championship was canceled due to the COVID-19 pandemic. She therefore participated in the 2020–21 season French championship, and was a finalist in the French Cup, losing in the final to the strong ASPTT Mulhouse. From 2022 to 2024, she played with Pays d'Aix Venelles in Ligue A of the French championship.

In the summer of 2024, Abderrahim accepted an offer from the powerful Greek club Olympiacos to play in Greece. With the Piraeus club, she achieved the Greek treble, winning the Hellenic Super Cup in 2024, as well as the Hellenic Cup and the Hellenic Championship of the 2024–25 season.

== International career ==
Yasmine Abderrahim has been a member of the Algerian national development teams since 2013 at the age of 14, with which she had significant success. In the 2014 she won the bronze medal in the Girls' U-18 Africa Championship, while in the 2013 and 2015 she won the silver medal in the Women's U-20 Africa Championship.

Since 2014, Yasmine Abderrahim has been playing for the Algeria women's national team. She made her debut on 26 July 2014, in a match against Bulgaria (2–3), for the World Grand Prix, in which Algeria lost all six matches. The first victories of Yasmine Abderrahim with the Algerian national team came in June–July 2015, at the World Grand Prix of that year, when the Algerian women defeated the Australian team twice. She also played with the national team in the qualification round for the 2016 Rio Olympic Games, where the Algerian team finished in fourth place, losing the last ticket to the next round to Kenya (0–3).

The Algerian outside hitter's first gold medal came in the Volleyball tournament at the 2023 Pan Arab Games, where Algeria defeated Tunisia 3–0 in the final.

== Sporting achievements ==
=== National team ===
- 2013 U-20 African Championship Nigeria
- 2014 U-18 African Championship Egypt
- 2015 U-20 African Championship Egypt
- 2023 Volleyball at Arab Games Algeria

=== Clubs ===
==== National championships ====
- 2018/2019 French 2 League, with Istres Provence Volley
- 2024/2025 Hellenic Championship, with Olympiacos Piraeus

==== National trophies ====
- 2017/2018 Algerian Cup, with ASW Bejaia
- 2018/2019 French Amateur Cup, with Istres Provence Volley
- 2020/2021 French Cup, with Istres Provence Volley
- 2024 Hellenic Super Cup, with Olympiacos Piraeus
- 2024/2025 Hellenic Cup, with Olympiacos Piraeus

=== Individuals ===
- 2015 U-20 African Championship: Best Spiker
