= 2024 Women's U20 African Nations Volleyball Championship =

Tournament details
- Host country: Tunisia
- City: Tunis
- Dates: 24–30 August
- Teams: 6
- Venue: 1 (in 1 host city)

Final positions
- Champions: Tunisia (1st title)
- Runners-up: Egypt
- Third place: Algeria
- Fourth place: Kenya

Tournament statistics
- Matches played: 20

The 2024 Women's U20 African Nations Volleyball Championship was the 13th edition of the Women's U20 African Nations Volleyball Championship, the biennial international youth volleyball tournament organised by the African Volleyball Confederation (CAVB) for the women's under-20 national teams of Africa. It was held in Tunis, Tunisia from 24 to 29 August 2024.

Four national teams took part in the tournament, with players born on or after 1 January 2005 being eligible to participate.

Same as previous editions, the tournament acted as the CAVB qualifiers for the FIVB Volleyball Women's U21 World Championship. The top three teams qualified for the 2025 FIVB Volleyball Women's U21 World Championship in Indonesia as the CAVB representatives.

Tunisia won their ninth title by beating Egypt 3–2 in the final. Algeria completed the podium after defeating Kenya 3–1 in the third-place match. Champions Tunisia, runners-up Egypt and third-place Algeria qualified for the 2025 FIVB Volleyball Women's U21 World Championship.

== Host and venue ==
The African Volleyball Confederation awarded Tunisia the hosting rights for the tournament on 24 June 2024. The competition took place in Tunis at the Al Machatel Hall, a venue located in the Baldevebe Nursery west of Belvedere Park. The Al Machatel Hall had recently been inaugurated in July 2024.

== Preliminary round ==
All match times are in local times, TNT (UTC+1), as listed by CAVB.

Pos	Team	Pld	W	L	Pts	SW	SL	SR	SPW	SPL	SPR	Qualification
1	Tunisia (H)	3	3	0	8	9	2	4.500	261	215	1.214	Semi-final 1
2	Egypt	3	2	1	6	6	3	2.000	214	168	1.274	Semi-final 2
3	Algeria	3	1	2	4	5	6	0.833	238	234	1.017	Semi-final 2
4	Kenya	3	0	3	0	0	9	0.000	129	225	0.573	Semi-final 1

Source: FIVB
Rules for classification: 1) Matches won; 2) Points; 3) Sets Ratio; 4) Setpoints ratio; 5) Head-to-head result.
(H) Host

Date	Time		Score		Set 1	Set 2	Set 3	Set 4	Set 5	Total	Report
24 Aug	15:00	Egypt	3–0	Kenya	25–13	25–12	25–9			75–34	Report
24 Aug	20:00	Tunisia	3–2	Algeria	25–16	25–23	22–25	22–25	17–15	111–104	Report
25 Aug	17:00	Kenya	0–3	Algeria	13–25	15–25	18–25			46–75	Report
25 Aug	20:00	Tunisia	3–0	Egypt	25–19	25–23	25–20			75–62	Report
26 Aug	17:00	Egypt	3–0	Algeria	25–18	25–16	27–25			77–59	Report
26 Aug	20:00	Kenya	0–3	Tunisia	18–25	15–25	16–25			49–75	Report

== Final round ==
All match times are in local times, TNT (UTC+1), as listed by CAVB.

Semi-finals
28 August
Tunisia	3
Kenya	0
28 August
Egypt	3
Algeria	1

Final
29 August
Tunisia	3
Egypt	2
Third-place match
29 August
Kenya	1
Algeria	3

=== Semi-finals ===
Date	Time		Score		Set 1	Set 2	Set 3	Set 4	Set 5	Total	Report
28 Aug	16:00	Egypt	3–1	Algeria	18–25	25–13	25–17	25–12		93–67	Report
28 Aug	18:00	Tunisia	3–0	Kenya	25–12	25–14	25–22			75–48	Report

=== 3rd place match ===
Date	Time		Score		Set 1	Set 2	Set 3	Set 4	Set 5	Total	Report
29 Aug	14:00	Kenya	1–3	Algeria	20–25	25–22	15–25	15–25		75–97	Report

=== Final ===
Date	Time		Score		Set 1	Set 2	Set 3	Set 4	Set 5	Total	Report
29 Aug	17:00	Tunisia	3–2	Egypt	25–20	23–25	22–25	25–20	15–7	110–97	Report

== Final standing ==
Qualified for 2025 FIVB Women's U21 World Championship.

Rank	Team
1st place, gold medalist(s)	Tunisia
2nd place, silver medalist(s)	Egypt
3rd place, bronze medalist(s)	Algeria
4	Kenya

2024 Women's U20 African Nations Championship champions

Tunisia
First title

Team Roster:

1 Na Ben Hamza, 2 Y Salhi, 4 Souleyma Mbarek (L), 5 Jeridi, 6 Dallegi (L), 9 S Ben Hamida, 10 M Ben Youssef, 11 Elkrimi, 12 Eya Toumi, 17 Jenhani Sahar, 18 Karamosly, 19 D Ben Ammar.

Head coach: (Tunisia) Yassine Seghairi

== Individual awards ==
The following individual awards were presented at the end of the tournament.

- Most valuable player (MVP)

Eya Toumi (TUN)

- Best middle blockers

Jenhani Sahar (TUN)
Nada Sesalem (EGY)

- Best setter

Hendawi Jana (EGY)

- Best opposite spiker

Alida Bennour (ALG)

- Best outside spikers

Eya Toumi (TUN)
Farah El Hanawi (EGY)

- Best libero

Souleyma Mbarek (TUN)

== See also ==
- 2024 Men's U20 African Nations Volleyball Championship
