= Germany women's national under-21 volleyball team =

Germany U20
- Nickname(s): Die Schmetterlinge (The butterflies). Die Adler (The Eagles); Die Mannschaft (The Team)
- Association: Deutscher Volleyball-Verband
- Confederation: CEV

Uniforms
Home	Away

FIVB U21 World Championship
- Appearances: 8 (First in 1991)
- Best result: (gold) Champions : (2009)

CEV Europe U19 Championship
- Appearances: 13 (First in 1992)
- Best result: (bronze) Third place : (1994)
- www.volleyball-verband.de (in German)

The Germany women's national under-20 volleyball team represents Germany in international women's volleyball competitions and friendly matches under the age 20 and it is ruled by the Deutscher Volleyball Verband That is an affiliate of International Volleyball Federation FIVB and also a part of European Volleyball Confederation CEV.

== Results ==
=== FIVB U20 World Championship ===
Champions Runners up Third place Fourth place

FIVB U20 World Championship
Year	Round	Position	Pld	W	L	SW	SL	Squad
(Brazil) 1977	see West Germany							
(Mexico) 1981	see West Germany							
(Italy) 1985	see West Germany							
(South Korea) 1987	see West Germany							
(Peru) 1989	see West Germany							
(Czechoslovakia) 1991		8th place						Squad
(Brazil) 1993		5th place						Squad
(Thailand) 1995		8th place						Squad
(Poland) 1997		7th place						Squad
(Canada) 1999	Didn't Qualify							
(Dominican Republic) 2001		9th place						Squad
(Thailand) 2003		5th place						Squad
(Turkey) 2005	Didn't Qualify							
(Thailand) 2007		7th place						Squad
(Mexico) 2009		1st place						Squad
(Peru) 2011	Didn't Qualify							
(Czech Republic) 2013	Didn't Qualify							
(Puerto Rico) 2015	Didn't Qualify							
(Mexico) 2017	Didn't Qualify							
Total	1 Title	8/19						

=== Europe U19 Championship ===
Champions Runners up Third place Fourth place

Europe U19 Championship
Year	Round	Position	Pld	W	L	SW	SL	Squad
(Hungary) 1966	See West Germany							
(Soviet Union) 1969	See West Germany							
(Italy) 1971	See West Germany							
(Netherlands) 1973	See West Germany							
(West Germany) 1975	See West Germany							
(Socialist Federal Republic of Yugoslavia) 1977	See West Germany							
(Spain) 1979	See West Germany							
(West Germany) 1982	See West Germany							
(France) 1984	See West Germany							
(Bulgaria) 1986	See West Germany							
(Italy) 1988	See West Germany							
(Austria) 1990	See West Germany							
(Greece) 1992		7th place						Squad
(Hungary) 1994		Third place						Squad
(Turkey) 1996		9th place						Squad
(Belgium) 1998		11th place						Squad

Europe U19 Championship
Year	Round	Position	Pld	W	L	SW	SL	Squad
(Switzerland) 2000		5th place						Squad
(Croatia) 2002		8th place						Squad
(Slovakia) 2004		7th place						Squad
(France) 2006	Didn't Qualify							
(Italy) 2008		5th place						Squad
(Serbia) 2010		4th place						Squad
(Turkey) 2012		5th place						Squad
(Finland) / (Estonia) 2014	Didn't Qualify							
(Hungary) / (Slovakia) 2016		7th place						Squad
(Albania) 2018		6th place						Squad
Total	0 Titles	13/26						

== Team ==
=== Current squad ===
The following is the German roster in the 2016 European U19 Championship.

Head coach: (Germany) Jan Lindenmair

Name	Year of birth	Height	Weight	Spike	Block
Agbortabi Vanessa	1998	1.80 m (5 ft 11 in)	0 kg (0 lb)	000 cm (0 in)	000 cm (0 in)
Böhler Jenny	1998	1.81 m (5 ft 11 in)	0 kg (0 lb)	000 cm (0 in)	000 cm (0 in)
Cyris Emma	2001	1.86 m (6 ft 1 in)	0 kg (0 lb)	000 cm (0 in)	000 cm (0 in)
Dreblow Sophie	1998	1.67 m (5 ft 6 in)	0 kg (0 lb)	000 cm (0 in)	000 cm (0 in)
Dreisewer Stella	1999	1.87 m (6 ft 2 in)	0 kg (0 lb)	000 cm (0 in)	000 cm (0 in)
Glaab Corina	2000	1.80 m (5 ft 11 in)	0 kg (0 lb)	000 cm (0 in)	000 cm (0 in)
Große-Scharmann Lena	1998	1.84 m (6 ft 0 in)	0 kg (0 lb)	000 cm (0 in)	000 cm (0 in)
Henning Maike	1999	1.76 m (5 ft 9 in)	0 kg (0 lb)	000 cm (0 in)	000 cm (0 in)
Herzog Maike	1999	1.96 m (6 ft 5 in)	0 kg (0 lb)	000 cm (0 in)	000 cm (0 in)
Hoffmann Julika	1998	1.84 m (6 ft 0 in)	0 kg (0 lb)	000 cm (0 in)	000 cm (0 in)
Kästner Pia	1998	1.82 m (6 ft 0 in)	0 kg (0 lb)	000 cm (0 in)	000 cm (0 in)
Kettenbach Elisabeth	2001	1.74 m (5 ft 9 in)	0 kg (0 lb)	000 cm (0 in)	000 cm (0 in)
Klein Luise	1999	1.78 m (5 ft 10 in)	0 kg (0 lb)	000 cm (0 in)	000 cm (0 in)
Köppen Gina	1998	1.87 m (6 ft 2 in)	0 kg (0 lb)	000 cm (0 in)	000 cm (0 in)
Krause Sabrina	1998	1.96 m (6 ft 5 in)	0 kg (0 lb)	000 cm (0 in)	000 cm (0 in)
Lenz Cindy	1998	1.85 m (6 ft 1 in)	0 kg (0 lb)	000 cm (0 in)	000 cm (0 in)
Leweling Pia	1998	1.82 m (6 ft 0 in)	0 kg (0 lb)	000 cm (0 in)	000 cm (0 in)
Liu Jenny	2000	1.79 m (5 ft 10 in)	0 kg (0 lb)	000 cm (0 in)	000 cm (0 in)
Lohmann Elisa	1998	1.74 m (5 ft 9 in)	0 kg (0 lb)	000 cm (0 in)	000 cm (0 in)
Maase Rica	1999	1.86 m (6 ft 1 in)	0 kg (0 lb)	000 cm (0 in)	000 cm (0 in)
Morgenroth Paula	1999	1.70 m (5 ft 7 in)	0 kg (0 lb)	000 cm (0 in)	000 cm (0 in)
Orthmann Hanna	1998	1.85 m (6 ft 1 in)	0 kg (0 lb)	000 cm (0 in)	000 cm (0 in)
Reindanz Mareike	1998	1.78 m (5 ft 10 in)	0 kg (0 lb)	000 cm (0 in)	000 cm (0 in)
Sabrowske Natalie	1998	1.86 m (6 ft 1 in)	0 kg (0 lb)	000 cm (0 in)	000 cm (0 in)
Schäfer Malin	1998	1.80 m (5 ft 11 in)	0 kg (0 lb)	000 cm (0 in)	000 cm (0 in)
Senger Lisa	1998	1.76 m (5 ft 9 in)	0 kg (0 lb)	000 cm (0 in)	000 cm (0 in)
Skinner Aisha	1999	1.83 m (6 ft 0 in)	0 kg (0 lb)	000 cm (0 in)	000 cm (0 in)
Spöler Esther	1998	1.84 m (6 ft 0 in)	0 kg (0 lb)	000 cm (0 in)	000 cm (0 in)
Stemmler Lydia	2001	1.83 m (6 ft 0 in)	0 kg (0 lb)	000 cm (0 in)	000 cm (0 in)
Timmer Pia	2001	1.88 m (6 ft 2 in)	0 kg (0 lb)	000 cm (0 in)	000 cm (0 in)
Weidt Merle	1999	1.86 m (6 ft 1 in)	0 kg (0 lb)	000 cm (0 in)	000 cm (0 in)
Weitzel Camilla	2000	1.91 m (6 ft 3 in)	0 kg (0 lb)	000 cm (0 in)	000 cm (0 in)
Wenzel Julia	1998	1.79 m (5 ft 10 in)	0 kg (0 lb)	000 cm (0 in)	000 cm (0 in)
