= Egypt women's national under-21 volleyball team =

Youth volleyball team representing Egypt

Egypt Women U-20
- Association: Egyptian Volleyball Federation
- Confederation: CAVB

Uniforms
Home	Away	Third

FIVB U21 World Championship
- Appearances: 6 (First in 2005)
- Best result: 11th (2005)

African U20 Championship
- Appearances: 11 (First in 1998)
- Best result: (gold) Champions (2004, 2006, 2008, 2010, 2013, 2015, 2017, 2018, 2022)
- www.evbf.org (in Arabic)

The Egypt women's national under-20 volleyball team (Arabic: منتخب مصر للإناث تحت 20 سنة لكرة الطائرة), represents Egypt in international volleyball competitions and friendly matches.

== Results ==
=== FIVB U20 World Championship ===
Champions Runners up Third place Fourth place

FIVB U20 World Championship
Year	Round	Position	Pld	W	L	SW	SL	Squad
(Brazil) 1977	Didn't qualify							
(Mexico) 1981	Didn't qualify							
(Italy) 1985	Didn't qualify							
(South Korea) 1987	Didn't qualify							
(Peru) 1989	Didn't qualify							
(Czechoslovakia) 1991	Didn't qualify							
(Brazil) 1993	Didn't qualify							
(Thailand) 1995	Didn't qualify							
(Poland) 1997	Didn't qualify							
(Canada) 1999	Didn't qualify							
(Dominican Republic) 2001	Didn't qualify							
(Thailand) 2003	Didn't qualify							
(Turkey) 2005		11th place						Squad
(Thailand) 2007		12th place						Squad
(Mexico) 2009	Didn't Qualify							
(Peru) 2011		15th place						Squad
(Czech Republic) 2013		14th place						Squad
(Puerto Rico) 2015		16th place						Squad
(Mexico) 2017		16th place						Squad
(Mexico) 2019		15th place						Squad
(Belgium) (Netherlands) 2021		12th place						Squad
Total	0 Titles	8/21						

=== African U20 Championship ===
African U20 Championship
Year	Round	Position	Pld	W	L	SW	SL	Squad
(Tunisia) 2002		Runners-up						
(Nigeria) 2004		Champions						
(Egypt) 2006		Champions						
(Kenya) 2008		Champions						
(Tunisia) 2010		Champions						
(Nigeria) 2013		Champions						
(Egypt) 2015		Champions						
(Egypt) 2017		Champions						
(Kenya) 2018		Champions						
Total	8 Titles	9/9						

== Team ==
=== Current squad ===
The following is the Egyptian roster in the 2015 FIVB Volleyball Women's U20 World Championship.

Head Coach: Ahmed Fathi

No.	Name	Date of birth	Height	Weight	Spike	Block	2015 club
1	Mayar Mohamed	5 February 2000	1.86 m (6 ft 1 in)	78 kg (172 lb)	288 cm (113 in)	279 cm (110 in)	(Egypt) Al Ahly
4	Mai Moustafa (C)	1 October 1996	1.75 m (5 ft 9 in)	63 kg (139 lb)	280 cm (110 in)	260 cm (100 in)	(Egypt) Delfi
5	Salma Mahmoud	4 February 1999	1.75 m (5 ft 9 in)	56 kg (123 lb)	286 cm (113 in)	275 cm (108 in)	(Egypt) Al Ahly
6	Nourallah Amin	25 November 2000	1.86 m (6 ft 1 in)	70 kg (150 lb)	286 cm (113 in)	275 cm (108 in)	(Egypt) Al Ahly
7	Malak Badawy	17 June 1996	1.75 m (5 ft 9 in)	64 kg (141 lb)	273 cm (107 in)	289 cm (114 in)	(Egypt) Sporting
8	Mariam Ebrahim	13 March 1997	1.67 m (5 ft 6 in)	63 kg (139 lb)	273 cm (107 in)	261 cm (103 in)	(Egypt) Al Shams
9	Rahma Almohandes	9 November 1996	1.75 m (5 ft 9 in)	63 kg (139 lb)	277 cm (109 in)	265 cm (104 in)	(Egypt) Al Ahly
10	Yasmin Hussein	11 January 1997	1.75 m (5 ft 9 in)	74 kg (163 lb)	188 cm (74 in)	178 cm (70 in)	(Egypt) Sporting
11	Hend Farag	29 September 1997	1.86 m (6 ft 1 in)	68 kg (150 lb)	277 cm (109 in)	272 cm (107 in)	(Egypt) Al Said
12	Icel Nadim	19 February 1996	1.62 m (5 ft 4 in)	52 kg (115 lb)	253 cm (100 in)	267 cm (105 in)	(Egypt) Al Shams
16	Jailan Tawfik	12 June 1997	1.75 m (5 ft 9 in)	65 kg (143 lb)	292 cm (115 in)	279 cm (110 in)	(Egypt) Al Said
18	Rania Ashmawy	20 February 1996	1.74 m (5 ft 9 in)	67 kg (148 lb)	273 cm (107 in)	264 cm (104 in)	(Egypt) Zamalek
