= Croatia women's national under-21 volleyball team =

Croatia U21
- Association: Croatian Volleyball Federation
- Confederation: CEV

Uniforms
Home	Away	Third

FIVB U21 World Championship
- Appearances: 3 (First in 2001)
- Best result: 5th Place : (2001)

CEV Europe U19 Championship
- Appearances: 11 (First in 1994)
- Best result: (silver) Runners-Up : (2006)

The Croatia women's national under-20 volleyball team represents Croatia in international women's volleyball competitions and friendly matches under the age 20 and it is ruled by the Croatian Volleyball Federation That is an affiliate of International Volleyball Federation FIVB and also a part of European Volleyball Confederation CEV.

== Results ==
=== FIVB U20 World Championship ===
Champions Runners up Third place Fourth place

FIVB U20 World Championship record
Year	Round	Position	Pld	W	L	SW	SL	Squad
(Brazil) 1993	Did not qualify							
(Thailand) 1995	Did not qualify							
(Poland) 1997	Did not qualify							
(Canada) 1999	Did not qualify							
(Dominican Republic) 2001	Quarterfinals	5th place	7	5	2	17	8	Squad
(Thailand) 2003	Did not qualify							
(Turkey) 2005	Group stage	9th place	5	1	4	6	14	Squad
(Thailand) 2007	Group stage	10th place	7	2	5	12	17	Squad
(Mexico) 2009	Did not qualify							
(Peru) 2011	Did not qualify							
(Czech Republic) 2013	Did not qualify							
(Puerto Rico) 2015	Did not qualify							
(Mexico) 2017	Did not qualify							
(Mexico) 2019	Did not qualify							
(Belgium) / (Netherlands) 2021	Did not qualify							
(Mexico) 2023	Did not qualify							
Total	Qualified: 3/16		19	8	11	35	39	—

=== Europe U19 Championship ===
Champions Runners up Third place Fourth place

Junior European Championship record
Year	Round	Position	Pld	W	L	SW	SL	Squad
(Hungary) 1994	Group stage	5th place	7	4	3	14	13	Squad
(Turkey) 1996	Group stage	6th place	7	3	4	11	17	Squad
(Belgium) 1998	Group stage	7th place	7	3	4	12	14	Squad
(Switzerland) 2000	Group stage	7th place	7	4	3	16	15	Squad
(Croatia) 2002	Group stage	11th place	7	2	5	10	16	Squad
(Slovakia) 2004	Semifinals	4th place	7	4	3	12	10	Squad
(France) 2006	Final	Runners-Up	7	5	2	16	9	Squad
(Italy) 2008	Group stage	12th place	5	0	5	2	15	Squad
(Serbia) 2010	Did not qualify							
(Turkey) 2012	Did not qualify							
(Finland) / (Estonia) 2014	Did not qualify							
(Hungary) / (Slovakia) 2016	Group stage	12th place	5	0	5	3	15	Squad
(Albania) 2018	Did not qualify							
(Bosnia and Herzegovina) / (Croatia) 2020	Group stage	7th place	5	1	4	7	13	Squad
(North Macedonia) 2022	Group stage	6th place	7	3	4	10	15	Squad
(Bulgaria) / (Republic of Ireland) 2024	TBD	TBD						Squad
Total	Qualified: 12/16		71	29	42	113	152	—
