= African Junior Championships =

African Junior Championships may refer to:

- African Junior Athletics Championships
- African Handball Junior Nations Championship
- African Youth Championship (football)
- African Under-17 Championship (football)
- African Volleyball Championship U21
- African Volleyball Championship U19
- Women's Africa Volleyball Championship U20
- Girls' Africa Volleyball Championship U18
