= LNV Ligue A =

LNV Ligue A may refer to:

- LNV Ligue A Masculine, the top division of men's volleyball in France, governed by Ligue Nationale de Volley
- LNV Ligue A Féminine, the top division of women's volleyball in France, governed by Ligue Nationale de Volley
