= Tunisia women's national under-21 volleyball team =

Tunisia Women U-20
- Nickname(s): نسور قرطاج (Eagles of Carthage)
- Association: Tunisian Volleyball Federation
- Confederation: CAVB
- Head coach: Mohamed Meselmani

Uniforms
Home	Away	Third

FIVB U21 World Championship
- Appearances: 3 (First in 1995)
- Best result: 13th: 1995

African U20 Championship
- Appearances: 6 (First in 2002)
- Best result: Champions (gold) 2024
- www.ftvb.org
Honours
Event	1st	2nd	3rd
African Championship	1	4	2
Total	1	4	2

Tunisia women's national under-21 volleyball team
Medal record

African Championship
Gold medal – first place	2024 Tunis	Team
Silver medal – second place	2008 Nairobi	Team
Silver medal – second place	2010 Kelibia	Team
Silver medal – second place	2017 Cairo	Team
Silver medal – second place	2022 Kelibia	Team
Bronze medal – third place	2002 Sidi Bou Said	Team
Bronze medal – third place	2006 Alexandria	Team

The Tunisia women's national under-20 volleyball team (Arabic: منتخب تونس للإناث تحت 20 سنة لكرة الطائرة), nicknamed Les Aigles de Carthage (The Eagles of Carthage or The Carthage Eagles), represents Tunisia in international volleyball competitions and friendly matches. The team is one of the leading nations in women's volleyball on the African continent.

== Results ==
Champions Runners up Third place Fourth place

- Red border color indicates tournament was held on home soil.

=== FIVB U20 World Championship ===
FIVB U20 World Championship
Year	Round	Position	Pld	W	L	SW	SL	Squad
(Brazil) 1977	Did not compete							
(Mexico) 1981	Did not compete							
(Italy) 1985	Did not compete							
(South Korea) 1987	Did not compete							
(Peru) 1989	Did not compete							
(Czechoslovakia) 1991	Did not compete							
(Brazil) 1993	Did not compete							
(Thailand) 1995		13th						Squad
(Poland) 1997	Did not compete							
(Canada) 1999	Did not compete							
(Dominican Republic) 2001	Did not compete							
(Thailand) 2003	Did not compete							
(Turkey) 2005	Did not compete							
(Thailand) 2007	Did not compete							
(Mexico) 2009	Did not compete							
(Peru) 2011		16th						Squad
(Czech Republic) 2013	Did not compete							
(Puerto Rico) 2015	Did not compete							
(Mexico) 2017	Did not compete							
(Mexico) 2019	Did not compete							
(Netherlands) / (Belgium) 2021	Did not compete							
(Mexico) 2023		16th						Squad
Total	0 Title	3/22						

=== African U20 Championship ===
African U20 Championship
Year	Round	Position	Pld	W	L	SW	SL	Squad
(Tunisia) 2002		3rd						
(Nigeria) 2004	Did not compete							
(Egypt) 2006		3rd						
(Kenya) 2008		2nd						
(Tunisia) 2010		2nd						
(Nigeria) 2013	Did not compete							
(Egypt) 2015	Did not compete							
(Egypt) 2017		2nd						
(Kenya) 2018	Did not compete							
(Tunisia) 2024		1st						
Total	1 Title	6/10						

== See also ==
- Tunisia women's national volleyball team
- Tunisia women's national under-23 volleyball team
- Tunisia women's national under-18 volleyball team
- Tunisian Volleyball Federation
