= Slovakia women's national under-21 volleyball team =

Slovakia U20
- Association: Slovak Volleyball Federation
- Confederation: CEV

Uniforms
Home	Away	Third

FIVB U21 World Championship
- Appearances: 1 (First in 2011)
- Best result: 7th Place : (2011)

Europe U19 Championship
- Appearances: 6 (First in 2004)
- Best result: 6th place : (2010, 2016)
- www.svf.sk (in Slovak)

The Slovakia women's national under-20 volleyball team represents Slovakia in international women's volleyball competitions and friendly matches under the age of 20 and it is ruled by the Slovak Volleyball Federation That is an affiliate of the Federation of International Volleyball FIVB and also a part of European Volleyball Confederation CEV.

== Results ==
=== FIVB U21 World Championship ===
Champions Runners up Third place Fourth place

FIVB U21 World Championship
Year	Round	Position	Pld	W	L	SW	SL	Squad
(Brazil) → 1977	See Czechoslovakia							
(Brazil) ← 1993	See Czechoslovakia							
(Thailand) → 1995	Didn't qualify							
(Mexico) ← 2009	Didn't qualify							
(Peru) 2011		7th place						Squad
(Czech Republic) → 2013	Didn't qualify							
(Belgium) / (Netherlands) ← 2021	Didn't qualify							
Total	0 Titles	1/21						

=== Europe U19 Championship ===
Champions Runners up Third place Fourth place

Europe U19 Championship
Year	Round	Position	Pld	W	L	SW	SL	Squad
From (Hungary) 1966 to (Hungary) 1994	See Czechoslovakia							
(Turkey) 1996	Didn't qualify							
(Belgium) 1998	Didn't qualify							
(Switzerland) 2000	Didn't qualify							
(Croatia) 2002	Didn't qualify							
(Slovakia) 2004		9th place						Squad
(France) 2006	Didn't qualify							
(Italy) 2008	Didn't qualify							
(Serbia) 2010		6th place						Squad
(Turkey) 2012		9th place						Squad
(Finland) / (Estonia) 2014	Didn't Qualify							
(Hungary) / (Slovakia) 2016		6th place						Squad
(Albania) 2018		10th place						Squad
(Croatia) / (Bosnia and Herzegovina) 2020		8th place						Squad
Total	0 Titles	6/13						

== Team ==
=== Current squad ===
The Following players is the Slovak players that Competed in the 2018 Women's U19 Volleyball European Championship

#	name	position	height	weight	birthday	spike	block
1	fricova karolina	outside-spiker	181	70	2000	296	285
3	kacerjakova diana	libero	175	62	2000	275	265
4	herdová lucia	middle-blocker	185	66	2000	295	279
5	erteltova ella	setter	179	77	2001	288	275
7	benekova laura	middle-blocker	179	63	2000	293	280
8	jelinkova simona	outside-spiker	182	79	2001	303	288
9	kvasnova lenka	opposite	186	80	2001	296	282
10	bodnarova bianka	outside-spiker	176	67	2000	280	269
12	kubova nicol	setter	174	66	2000	280	268
13	bojnanska tatiana	libero	168	58	2000	275	265
14	morihladkova ivana	outside-spiker	177	64	2000	280	269
15	hrusecka tezera	setter	197	80	2002	301	294
16	kupciova barbora	outside-spiker	184	74	2000	303	286
20	foldesiova rebecca	middle-blocker	181	72	2002	295	275
21	skrlecova ema	setter	181	68	2001	295	275
	kardosova ivana	libero	174	61	2000	283	270
	konarova zuzana	outside-spiker	176	62	2001	294	277
	krajcikova barbora	libero	170	60	2000	268	262
	krajcirova viktoria	opposite	178	64	2001	298	279
	kubicarova ema	outside-spiker	176	63	2000	281	270
	kucserova karolina	outside-spiker	188	65	2002	310	294
	laucikova kristina	setter	173	66	2002	293	264
	ravasova ema	middle-blocker	187	70	2000	294	281
	sivicekova sofia	setter	169	68	2002	272	255
	smieskova ema	middle-blocker	185	73	2003	298	286
	sobolovska rebeca	setter	1787	70	2002	285	266
	stryckova viktoria	outside-spiker	172	60	2001	301	284
	tothova patricia	outside-spiker	181	60	2001	276	265
	trebichavska katrin	outside-spiker	174	63	2000	285	277
	vajdova martina	outside-spiker	184	60	2003	290	279
