= 2016 Women's U19 Volleyball European Championship =

Tournament details
- Host countries: Slovakia; Hungary
- Dates: 27 August – 4 September
- Teams: 12
- Venues: 2 (in 2 host cities)

Final positions
- Champions: Russia (15th title)

Tournament awards
- MVP: (Russia) Anna Kotikova (RUS)

The 2016 Women's U19 Volleyball European Championship was played in Slovakia and Hungary from 27 August to 4 September 2016.

== Participating teams ==
- Host Countries
  - Hungary
  - Slovakia
- Qualified through 2016 Women's U19 Volleyball European Championship Qualification
  - Belarus
  - Belgium
  - Bulgaria
  - Croatia
  - France
  - Germany
  - Italy
  - Russia
  - Serbia
  - Turkey

== Pools composition ==
| Pool I | Pool II |
|---|---|
| Slovakia | Hungary |
| Turkey | Italy |
| Belgium | Russia |
| France | Belarus |
| Bulgaria | Serbia |
| Croatia | Germany |

== Venues ==
| Pool I and Final round | Pool II |
|---|---|
| Nitra, Slovakia | Győr, Hungary |
| City hall | Szechenyi Istvan University Hall |

== Preliminary round ==
- All times are Central European Summer Time (UTC+02:00)

=== Pool I ===
| Pos | Team | Pld | W | L | Pts | SW | SL | SR | SPW | SPL | SPR | Qualification |
|---|---|---|---|---|---|---|---|---|---|---|---|---|
| 1 | Turkey | 5 | 5 | 0 | 14 | 15 | 3 | 5.000 | 434 | 331 | 1.311 | Semifinals |
| 2 | Belgium | 5 | 4 | 1 | 10 | 12 | 8 | 1.500 | 442 | 414 | 1.068 | Semifinals |
| 3 | Slovakia | 5 | 3 | 2 | 9 | 12 | 8 | 1.500 | 450 | 388 | 1.160 | 5th–8th Semifinals |
| 4 | Bulgaria | 5 | 2 | 3 | 7 | 11 | 12 | 0.917 | 455 | 504 | 0.903 | 5th–8th Semifinals |
| 5 | France | 5 | 1 | 4 | 4 | 5 | 12 | 0.417 | 331 | 387 | 0.855 | |
| 6 | Croatia | 5 | 0 | 5 | 1 | 3 | 15 | 0.200 | 344 | 432 | 0.796 | |

| Date | Time | | Score | | Set 1 | Set 2 | Set 3 | Set 4 | Set 5 | Total | Report |
|---|---|---|---|---|---|---|---|---|---|---|---|
| 27 Aug | 15:00 | Croatia | 2–3 | Belgium | 20–25 | 16–25 | 25–20 | 25–22 | 12–15 | 98–107 | Report |
| 27 Aug | 17:30 | Slovakia | 1–3 | Turkey | 18–25 | 24–26 | 25–23 | 24–26 | | 91–100 | Report |
| 27 Aug | 20:00 | France | 2–3 | Bulgaria | 19–25 | 25–20 | 25–20 | 20–25 | 12–15 | 101–105 | Report |
| 28 Aug | 15:00 | Turkey | 3–0 | Belgium | 25–23 | 25–14 | 25–17 | | | 75–54 | Report |
| 28 Aug | 17:30 | Slovakia | 3–0 | France | 25–22 | 25–12 | 25–11 | | | 75–45 | Report |
| 28 Aug | 20:00 | Bulgaria | 3–1 | Croatia | 25–22 | 26–24 | 24–26 | 25–17 | | 100–89 | Report |
| 29 Aug | 15:00 | France | 0–3 | Turkey | 9–25 | 13–25 | 18–25 | | | 40–75 | Report |
| 29 Aug | 17:30 | Croatia | 0–3 | Slovakia | 17–25 | 11–25 | 19–25 | | | 47–75 | Report |
| 29 Aug | 20:00 | Belgium | 3–1 | Bulgaria | 20–25 | 25–16 | 25–17 | 25–14 | | 95–72 | Report |
| 31 Aug | 15:00 | France | 3–0 | Croatia | 25–14 | 25–23 | 25–18 | | | 75–55 | Report |
| 31 Aug | 17:30 | Slovakia | 2–3 | Belgium | 25–23 | 18–25 | 21–25 | 25–21 | 10–15 | 99–109 | Report |
| 31 Aug | 20:00 | Turkey | 3–2 | Bulgaria | 23–25 | 25–13 | 21–25 | 25–18 | 15–10 | 109–91 | Report |
| 1 Sep | 15:00 | Belgium | 3–0 | France | 25–22 | 25–23 | 27–25 | | | 77–70 | Report |
| 1 Sep | 17:30 | Croatia | 0–3 | Turkey | 21–25 | 23–25 | 11–25 | | | 55–75 | Report |
| 1 Sep | 20:00 | Bulgaria | 2–3 | Slovakia | 25–22 | 15–25 | 25–23 | 14–25 | 8–15 | 87–110 | Report |

=== Pool II ===
| Pos | Team | Pld | W | L | Pts | SW | SL | SR | SPW | SPL | SPR | Qualification |
|---|---|---|---|---|---|---|---|---|---|---|---|---|
| 1 | Russia | 5 | 4 | 1 | 12 | 13 | 4 | 3.250 | 408 | 344 | 1.186 | Semifinals |
| 2 | Serbia | 5 | 4 | 1 | 11 | 13 | 6 | 2.167 | 445 | 382 | 1.165 | Semifinals |
| 3 | Italy | 5 | 4 | 1 | 11 | 13 | 7 | 1.857 | 470 | 443 | 1.061 | 5th–8th Semifinals |
| 4 | Germany | 5 | 2 | 3 | 7 | 9 | 10 | 0.900 | 417 | 436 | 0.956 | 5th–8th Semifinals |
| 5 | Hungary | 5 | 1 | 4 | 2 | 4 | 14 | 0.286 | 360 | 417 | 0.863 | |
| 6 | Belarus | 5 | 0 | 5 | 2 | 4 | 15 | 0.267 | 360 | 438 | 0.822 | |

| Date | Time | | Score | | Set 1 | Set 2 | Set 3 | Set 4 | Set 5 | Total | Report |
|---|---|---|---|---|---|---|---|---|---|---|---|
| 27 Aug | 15:30 | Belarus | 0–3 | Russia | 9–25 | 16–25 | 18–25 | | | 43–75 | Report |
| 27 Aug | 18:00 | Hungary | 1–3 | Germany | 21–25 | 23–25 | 25–21 | 18–25 | | 87–96 | Report |
| 27 Aug | 20:30 | Serbia | 1–3 | Italy | 22–25 | 25–22 | 14–25 | 21–25 | | 82–97 | Report |
| 28 Aug | 15:30 | Germany | 0–3 | Russia | 24–26 | 21–25 | 21–25 | | | 66–76 | Report |
| 28 Aug | 18:00 | Hungary | 0–3 | Serbia | 16–25 | 15–25 | 20–25 | | | 51–75 | Report |
| 28 Aug | 20:30 | Italy | 3–2 | Belarus | 22–25 | 25–23 | 27–25 | 19–25 | 15–12 | 108–110 | Report |
| 29 Aug | 15:30 | Serbia | 3–2 | Germany | 25–19 | 21–25 | 25–11 | 28–30 | 15–7 | 114–92 | Report |
| 29 Aug | 18:00 | Belarus | 2–3 | Hungary | 20–25 | 17–25 | 25–16 | 26–24 | 7–15 | 95–105 | Report |
| 29 Aug | 20:30 | Russia | 3–1 | Italy | 25–23 | 25–23 | 20–25 | 25–16 | | 95–87 | Report |
| 31 Aug | 15:30 | Serbia | 3–0 | Belarus | 25–13 | 25–22 | 25–21 | | | 75–56 | Report |
| 31 Aug | 18:00 | Hungary | 0–3 | Russia | 24–26 | 10–25 | 15–25 | | | 49–76 | Report |
| 31 Aug | 20:30 | Germany | 1–3 | Italy | 19–25 | 24–26 | 29–27 | 16–25 | | 88–103 | Report |
| 1 Sep | 15:30 | Russia | 1–3 | Serbia | 26–24 | 21–25 | 16–25 | 23–25 | | 86–99 | Report |
| 1 Sep | 18:00 | Italy | 3–0 | Hungary | 25–23 | 25–22 | 25–23 | | | 75–68 | Report |
| 1 Sep | 20:30 | Belarus | 0–3 | Germany | 21–25 | 17–25 | 18–25 | | | 56–75 | Report |

== Final round ==
- All times are Central European Summer Time (UTC+02:00)

=== 5th–8th place ===
Semifinals
3 September
Slovakia | 3
Germany | 2
3 September
Bulgaria | 0
Italy | 3

5th place
4 September
Slovakia | 0
Italy | 3
7th place
4 September
Germany | 3
Bulgaria | 0

==== 5th–8th semifinals ====
| Date | Time | | Score | | Set 1 | Set 2 | Set 3 | Set 4 | Set 5 | Total | Report |
|---|---|---|---|---|---|---|---|---|---|---|---|
| 3 Sep | 12:00 | Slovakia | 3–2 | Germany | 25–20 | 19–25 | 30–28 | 18–25 | 15–10 | 107–108 | Report |
| 3 Sep | 14:30 | Bulgaria | 0–3 | Italy | 19–25 | 16–25 | 24–26 | | | 59–76 | Report |

==== 7th place match ====
| Date | Time | | Score | | Set 1 | Set 2 | Set 3 | Set 4 | Set 5 | Total | Report |
|---|---|---|---|---|---|---|---|---|---|---|---|
| 4 Sep | 10:00 | Germany | 3–0 | Bulgaria | 25–21 | 25–11 | 25–11 | | | 75–43 | Report |

==== 5th place match ====
| Date | Time | | Score | | Set 1 | Set 2 | Set 3 | Set 4 | Set 5 | Total | Report |
|---|---|---|---|---|---|---|---|---|---|---|---|
| 4 Sep | 12:30 | Slovakia | 0–3 | Italy | 13–25 | 9–25 | 10–25 | | | 32–75 | Report |

=== Final ===
Semifinals
3 September
Turkey | 0
Serbia | 3
3 September
Russia | 3
Belgium | 1

Final
4 September
Serbia | 0
Russia | 3
Third place
4 September
Turkey | 3
Belgium | 0

==== Semifinals ====
| Date | Time | | Score | | Set 1 | Set 2 | Set 3 | Set 4 | Set 5 | Total | Report |
|---|---|---|---|---|---|---|---|---|---|---|---|
| 3 Sep | 17:30 | Turkey | 0–3 | Serbia | 22–25 | 23–25 | 19–25 | | | 64–75 | Report |
| 3 Sep | 20:00 | Russia | 3–1 | Belgium | 19–25 | 25–20 | 25–18 | 25–14 | | 94–77 | Report |

==== 3rd place match ====
| Date | Time | | Score | | Set 1 | Set 2 | Set 3 | Set 4 | Set 5 | Total | Report |
|---|---|---|---|---|---|---|---|---|---|---|---|
| 4 Sep | 15:30 | Turkey | 3–0 | Belgium | 26–24 | 25–15 | 25–20 | | | 76–59 | Report |

==== Final ====
| Date | Time | | Score | | Set 1 | Set 2 | Set 3 | Set 4 | Set 5 | Total | Report |
|---|---|---|---|---|---|---|---|---|---|---|---|
| 4 Sep | 18:00 | Serbia | 0–3 | Russia | 24–26 | 18–25 | 19–25 | | | 61–76 | Report |

== Final standing ==
| Rank | Team |
|---|---|
| 1st place, gold medalist(s) | Russia |
| 2nd place, silver medalist(s) | Serbia |
| 3rd place, bronze medalist(s) | Turkey |
| 4 | Belgium |
| 5 | Italy |
| 6 | Slovakia |
| 7 | Germany |
| 8 | Bulgaria |
| 9 | France |
| 10 | Hungary |
| 11 | Belarus |
| 12 | Croatia |

2016 Women's Junior European champions

Russia
15th title

12–woman roster
Angelina Lazarenko, Inna Balyko, Anna Kotikova, Anastasia Stalnaya, Alina Podskalnaya, Aleksandra Oganezova, Ksenia Pligunova, Anastasia Stankevichute, Viktoria Russu, Elizaveta Kotova, Marina Tushova, Maria Vorobyeva
Head coach
Svetlana Safronova

== Awards ==
- Most valuable player
  (Russia) Anna Kotikova
- Best setter
  (Russia) Inna Balyko
- Best outside spikers
  (Slovakia) Karolina Fricova
  (Serbia) Katarina Lazović
- Best middle blockers
  (Russia) Angelina Lazarenko
  (Serbia) Jovana Kocić
- Best opposite spiker
  (Russia) Anna Kotikova
- Best libero
  (Italy) Giorgia Zannoni

== See also ==
- 2016 Men's U20 Volleyball European Championship
