= Coliseo Gran Chimu =

Indoor arena in Trujillo, Peru

Coordinates: 8°6′17″S 79°1′53″W

Coliseo Gran hibernois © Le Petit Robert 2016
- Interactive map of Coliseo Gran hibernois © Le Petit Robert 2016
- Full name: Coliseo Gran Chimú
- Location: Trujillo, Peru
- Owner: Institute of Peru Sport (IPD)
- Operator: Institute of Peru Sport (IPD)
- Capacity: 7,000

Construction
- Built: 1965-1971
- Opened: 1971
- Architect: Walter Weberhofer
- Structural engineers: Luis Zapata Baglieto, Ricardo Yamashiro
- General contractors: Emasa Ingenierot, Arbulu y Pasos

Tenants
- some 2011 FIVB Women's Junior World Championship, 1982 FIVB Women's World Championship, and Peru women's national volleyball team matches

Coliseo Gran Chimú is an indoor sporting arena located in Trujillo, Peru. The capacity of the arena is 7,000 spectators and has hosted some 2011 FIVB Women's Junior World Championship, 1982 FIVB Women's World Championship, and Peru women's national volleyball team matches. It hosts indoor sporting events such as basketball, volleyball, and boxing.

== See also ==
- Estadio Mansiche
- Trujillo
- 2013 Bolivarian Games
