= 2004 Women's Junior European Volleyball Championship =

Tournament details
- Host country: Slovakia
- Dates: 3 – 11 September 2004
- Teams: 12
- Venues: 2 (in 2 host cities)

Final positions
- Champions: Italy (3rd title)

The 2004 Women's Junior European Volleyball Championship was the 19th edition of the competition, with the main phase (contested between 12 teams) held in Slovakia from 3 to 11 September 2004.

== Qualification ==
Means of qualification		Qualifier
Host Country		Slovakia
Top three teams from 2002 tournament		Poland
Top three teams from 2002 tournament		Ukraine
Top three teams from 2002 tournament		Belarus
Qualification Round	Pool A	Netherlands
Qualification Round	Pool A	Croatia
Qualification Round	Pool B	Turkey
Qualification Round	Pool B	Switzerland
Qualification Round	Pool C	Russia
Qualification Round	Pool C	Serbia and Montenegro
Qualification Round	Pool D	Italy
Qualification Round	Pool D	Germany

== Venues ==
Pool I, Classification matches		Pool II, Final round	
Bardejov, Slovakia	Bardejov is located in Slovakia	Prešov, Slovakia	Prešov is located in Slovakia

== Preliminary round ==
=== Pool I ===
Pos	Team	Pld	W	L	Pts	SW	SL	SR	SPW	SPL	SPR	Qualification
1	Russia	5	5	0	10	15	3	5.000	431	391	1.102	Semifinals
2	Croatia	5	4	1	9	12	4	3.000	379	307	1.235	Semifinals
3	Turkey	5	3	2	8	11	9	1.222	459	412	1.114	5th–8th semifinals
4	Germany	5	2	3	7	8	9	0.889	372	379	0.982	5th–8th semifinals
5	Slovakia	5	1	4	6	4	12	0.333	309	393	0.786	
6	Poland	5	0	5	5	2	15	0.133	351	419	0.838	

Date	Time		Score		Set 1	Set 2	Set 3	Set 4	Set 5	Total	Report
3 Sep	15:00	Germany	0–3	Croatia	14–25	18–25	19–25			51–75	Report
3 Sep	17:30	Slovakia	3–0	Poland	25–22	25–21	25–22			75–65	Report
3 Sep	20:00	Turkey	2–3	Russia	23–25	25–18	23–25	25–21	9–15	105–104	Report
4 Sep	15:00	Poland	1–3	Croatia	14–25	19–25	25–21	23–25		81–96	Report
4 Sep	17:30	Slovakia	1–3	Turkey	25–22	18–25	13–25	15–25		71–97	Report
4 Sep	20:00	Russia	3–1	Germany	19–25	25–21	25–21	27–25		96–92	Report
5 Sep	15:00	Turkey	3–1	Poland	25–19	23–25	25–20	25–19		98–83	Report
5 Sep	17:30	Germany	3–0	Slovakia	25–23	25–19	25–13			75–55	Report
5 Sep	20:00	Croatia	0–3	Russia	23–25	20–25	15–25			58–75	Report
7 Sep	15:00	Turkey	3–1	Germany	25–20	25–17	23–25	25–17		98–79	Report
7 Sep	17:30	Slovakia	0–3	Croatia	6–25	17–25	16–25			39–75	Report
7 Sep	20:00	Poland	0–3	Russia	23–25	22–25	22–25			67–75	Report
8 Sep	15:00	Croatia	3–0	Turkey	25–22	25–19	25–20			75–61	Report
8 Sep	17:30	Germany	3–0	Poland	25–20	25–19	25–16			75–55	Report
8 Sep	20:00	Russia	3–0	Slovakia	27–25	25–17	29–27			81–69	Report

=== Pool II ===
Pos	Team	Pld	W	L	Pts	SW	SL	SR	SPW	SPL	SPR	Qualification
1	Serbia and Montenegro	5	5	0	10	15	3	5.000	429	314	1.366	Semifinals
2	Italy	5	4	1	9	14	4	3.500	417	332	1.256	Semifinals
3	Ukraine	5	3	2	8	10	6	1.667	375	340	1.103	5th–8th semifinals
4	Netherlands	5	2	3	7	7	11	0.636	379	403	0.940	5th–8th semifinals
5	Belarus	5	1	4	6	4	13	0.308	326	401	0.813	
6	Switzerland	5	0	5	5	2	15	0.133	286	422	0.678	

Date	Time		Score		Set 1	Set 2	Set 3	Set 4	Set 5	Total	Report
3 Sep	15:00	Belarus	1–3	Netherlands	20–25	11–25	25–19	18–25		74–94	Report
3 Sep	17:30	Serbia and Montenegro	3–0	Switzerland	25–11	25–6	25–9			75–26	Report
3 Sep	20:00	Ukraine	1–3	Italy	24–26	22–25	25–23	18–25		89–99	Report
4 Sep	15:00	Netherlands	1–3	Serbia and Montenegro	25–22	22–25	18–25	15–25		80–97	Report
4 Sep	17:30	Ukraine	3–0	Belarus	25–15	25–19	25–20			75–54	Report
4 Sep	20:00	Italy	3–0	Switzerland	25–13	25–18	25–11			75–42	Report
5 Sep	15:00	Serbia and Montenegro	3–0	Ukraine	25–19	25–20	25–21			75–60	Report
5 Sep	17:30	Switzerland	1–3	Netherlands	18–25	23–25	25–23	16–25		82–98	Report
5 Sep	20:00	Belarus	0–3	Italy	14–25	14–25	17–25			45–75	Report
7 Sep	15:00	Ukraine	3–0	Switzerland	26–24	25–14	25–20			76–58	Report
7 Sep	17:30	Belarus	0–3	Serbia and Montenegro	16–25	12–25	27–29			55–79	Report
7 Sep	20:00	Italy	3–0	Netherlands	25–20	25–10	25–23			75–53	Report
8 Sep	15:00	Switzerland	1–3	Belarus	25–23	15–25	16–25	22–25		78–98	Report
8 Sep	17:30	Serbia and Montenegro	3–2	Italy	25–13	23–25	15–25	25–22	15–8	103–93	Report
8 Sep	20:00	Netherlands	0–3	Ukraine	21–25	20–25	13–25			54–75	Report

== 5th–8th classification ==
Semifinals
10 September
Turkey	3
Netherlands	1
10 September
Germany	2
Ukraine	3

5th place match
11 September
Turkey	2
Ukraine	3
7th place match
11 September
Netherlands	1
Germany	3

=== 5th–8th semifinals ===
Date	Time		Score		Set 1	Set 2	Set 3	Set 4	Set 5	Total	Report
10 Sep	17:30	Turkey	3–1	Netherlands	25–13	26–28	25–15	25–21		101–77	Report
10 Sep	20:00	Germany	2–3	Ukraine	12–25	25–22	19–25	25–16	13–15	94–103	Report

=== 7th place match ===
Date	Time		Score		Set 1	Set 2	Set 3	Set 4	Set 5	Total	Report
11 Sep	11:00	Netherlands	1–3	Germany	25–22	18–25	19–25	20–25		82–97	Report

=== 5th place match ===
Date	Time		Score		Set 1	Set 2	Set 3	Set 4	Set 5	Total	Report
11 Sep	14:00	Turkey	2–3	Ukraine	23–25	22–25	25–19	25–22	10–15	105–106	Report

== Final round ==
Semifinals
10 September
Russia	0
Italy	3
10 September
Croatia	0
Serbia and Montenegro	3

Final
11 September
Italy	3
Serbia and Montenegro	0
3rd place match
11 September
Russia	3
Croatia	0

=== Semifinals ===
Date	Time		Score		Set 1	Set 2	Set 3	Set 4	Set 5	Total	Report
10 Sep	17:30	Russia	0–3	Italy	22–25	18–25	20–25			60–75	Report
10 Sep	20:00	Croatia	0–3	Serbia and Montenegro	22–25	29–31	17–25			68–81	Report

=== 3rd place match ===
Date	Time		Score		Set 1	Set 2	Set 3	Set 4	Set 5	Total	Report
11 Sep	15:30	Russia	3–0	Croatia	25–18	25–20	25–17			75–55	Report

=== Final ===
Date	Time		Score		Set 1	Set 2	Set 3	Set 4	Set 5	Total	Report
11 Sep	18:00	Italy	3–0	Serbia and Montenegro	25–14	25–13	25–16			75–43	Report

== Final standing ==
Rank	Team
1st place, gold medalist(s)	Italy
2nd place, silver medalist(s)	Serbia and Montenegro
3rd place, bronze medalist(s)	Russia
4	Croatia
5	Ukraine
6	Turkey
7	Germany
8	Netherlands
9	Belarus
10	Slovakia
11	Poland
12	Switzerland

Qualified for the 2005 Women's U20 World Championship
