= 2013 FIVB Volleyball Women's U20 World Championship – European qualification =

The qualification for the 2013 FIVB Women's Junior World Championship was held from 7–12 May 2013.

== Competing nations ==
Pool A	Pool B	Pool C	Pool D
Serbia; Belgium; France; Portugal; Denmark	Spain; Italy; Finland; Slovakia	Germany; Bulgaria; Croatia; Greece; Latvia	Slovenia; Poland; Romania; Russia

== Participating teams ==
- Host
  - Serbia
  - Italy
  - Bulgaria
  - Russia
- Qualified through 2012 Women's Junior European Volleyball Championship
  - Belgium
  - France
  - Portugal
  - Denmark
  - Spain
  - Finland
  - Slovakia
  - Croatia
  - Germany
  - Greece
  - Latvia
  - Romania
  - Poland
  - Slovenia

== Pools ==
=== Pool A ===
Matches of Pool A were played in Subotica, Serbia.

Pos	Team	Pld	W	L	Pts	SPW	SPL	SPR	SW	SL	SR
1	Serbia	4	4	0	12	324	196	1.653	12	1	12.000
2	France	4	3	1	8	318	294	1.082	9	6	1.500
3	Belgium	4	2	2	6	303	262	1.156	8	6	1.333
4	Portugal	4	1	3	3	213	306	0.696	3	10	0.300
5	Denmark	4	0	4	1	251	351	0.715	3	12	0.250

Date	Time		Score		Set 1	Set 2	Set 3	Set 4	Set 5	Total	Report
8 May	17:30	France	3–2	Denmark	19–25	20–25	25–13	25–20	15–10	104–93	Report
8 May	20:00	Portugal	0–3	Serbia	20–25	9–25	6–25			35–75	Report
9 May	17:30	Belgium	3–0	Denmark	25–12	25–13	25–10			75–35	Report
9 May	20:00	Serbia	3–0	France	25–17	25–16	25–12			75–45	Report
10 May	17:30	Denmark	1–3	Portugal	20–25	25–22	17–25	19–25		81–97	Report
10 May	20:00	France	3–1	Belgium	19–25	25–19	25–18	25–17		94–79	Report
11 May	17:30	Portugal	0–3	France	13–25	20–25	14–25			47–75	Report
11 May	20:00	Serbia	3–1	Belgium	25–16	24–26	25–20	25–12		99–74	Report
12 May	17:30	Belgium	3–0	Portugal	25–8	25–14	25–12			75–34	Report
12 May	20:00	Denmark	0–3	Serbia	15–25	13–25	14–25			42–75	Report

=== Pool B ===
Matches of Pool B were played in Cividale del Friuli, Italy.

Pos	Team	Pld	W	L	Pts	SPW	SPL	SPR	SW	SL	SR
1	Italy	3	3	0	9	258	201	1.284	9	1	9.000
2	Spain	3	2	1	5	249	255	0.976	6	6	1.000
3	Slovakia	3	1	2	3	245	267	0.918	4	7	0.571
4	Finland	3	0	3	1	269	298	0.903	4	9	0.444

Date	Time		Score		Set 1	Set 2	Set 3	Set 4	Set 5	Total	Report
10 May	16:00	Slovakia	1–3	Spain	18–25	18–25	25–21	16–25		77–96	Report
10 May	18:30	Italy	3–1	Finland	25–13	26–28	25–19	25–17		101–77	Report
11 May	16:00	Slovakia	3–1	Finland	25–21	25–20	26–28	25–23		101–92	Report
11 May	18:30	Spain	0–3	Italy	13–25	18–25	26–28			57–78	Report
12 May	16:00	Finland	2–3	Spain	25–16	17–25	21–25	25–15	12–15	100–96	Report
12 May	18:00	Italy	3–0	Slovakia	25–17	26–24	28–26			79–67	Report

=== Pool C ===
Matches of Pool C will be played in Samokov, Bulgaria.

Pos	Team	Pld	W	L	Pts	SPW	SPL	SPR	SW	SL	SR
1	Bulgaria	4	4	0	12	300	206	1.456	12	0	MAX
2	Germany	4	3	1	8	339	304	1.115	9	6	1.500
3	Croatia	4	2	2	6	325	320	1.016	8	8	1.000
4	Greece	4	1	3	4	322	343	0.939	6	10	0.600
5	Latvia	4	0	4	0	207	320	0.647	1	12	0.083

Date	Time		Score		Set 1	Set 2	Set 3	Set 4	Set 5	Total	Report
8 May	15:30	Greece	2–3	Croatia	25–20	25–16	16–25	19–25	13–15	98–101	Report
8 May	18:00	Bulgaria	3–0	Latvia	25–15	25–13	25–14			75–42	Report
9 May	15:30	Croatia	2–3	Germany	25–22	25–19	23–25	23–25	10–15	106–106	Report
9 May	18:00	Greece	0–3	Bulgaria	22–25	22–25	17–25			61–75	Report
10 May	15:30	Latvia	0–3	Croatia	11–25	18–25	12–25			41–75	Report
10 May	18:00	Germany	3–1	Greece	22–25	25–9	25–16	25–19		97–69	Report
11 May	15:30	Germany	3–0	Latvia	25–15	20–15	26–24			71–54	Report
11 May	18:00	Croatia	0–3	Bulgaria	12–25	9–25	22–25			43–75	Report
12 May	15:30	Latvia	1–3	Greece	22–25	25–19	16–25	7–25		70–94	Report
12 May	18:00	Bulgaria	3–0	Germany	25–15	25–23	25–22			75–60	Report

=== Pool D ===
Matches of Pool D will be played in Ramenskoye, Russia.

Pos	Team	Pld	W	L	Pts	SPW	SPL	SPR	SW	SL	SR
1	Russia	3	3	0	9	262	191	1.372	9	2	4.500
2	Slovenia	3	2	1	6	272	254	1.071	7	5	1.400
3	Poland	3	1	2	3	200	232	0.862	4	6	0.667
4	Romania	3	0	3	0	204	264	0.773	2	9	0.222

Date	Time		Score		Set 1	Set 2	Set 3	Set 4	Set 5	Total	Report
9 May	16:00	Poland	1–3	Slovenia	22–25	13–25	25–22	23–25		83–97	Report
9 May	18:30	Russia	3–1	Romania	25–14	25–8	16–25	25–22		91–69	Report
10 May	16:00	Slovenia	3–1	Romania	25–19	22–25	25–18	25–13		97–75	Report
10 May	18:30	Poland	0–3	Russia	14–25	8–25	19–25			41–75	Report
11 May	16:00	Romania	0–3	Poland	24–26	20–25	16–25			60–76	Report
11 May	18:30	Russia	3–1	Slovenia	21–25	25–16	25–23	25–17		96–81	Report
