= Women's U20 African Nations Volleyball Championship =

International youth volleyball competition

- Current season, competition or edition: 2024 Women's U20 African Volleyball Championship
- Sport: Volleyball
- Founded: 1986
- First season: 1986
- No. of teams: 6
- Continent: CAVB (Africa)
- Most recent champion: Kenya (1st title)
- Most titles: Egypt (8th title)

The Women's U-20 African Volleyball Championship, formerly known as the Women's Junior African Volleyball Championship, is a sport competition for national teams with women players under 20 years, currently held biannually and organized by the African Volleyball Confederation, the Africa volleyball federation.

== Summary ==
Year	Host		Final				3rd place match			Teams
Year	Host		Champions	Score	Runners-up		3rd place	Score	4th place	Teams
1998; Details	...		Nigeria	–	Egypt		Mauritius	–		
2000; Details	...			–				–		
2002; Details	(Tunisia); Sidi Bou Said		Algeria	Round-robin	Egypt		Tunisia	Round-robin	Senegal	5
2004; Details	(Nigeria); Abuja		Egypt	Round-robin	Nigeria		Senegal	—N/a		3
2006; Details	(Egypt); Alexandria		Egypt	Round-robin	Seychelles		Tunisia	Round-robin	Senegal	5
2008; Details	(Kenya); Nairobi		Egypt	Round-robin	Tunisia		Kenya	Round-robin	Seychelles	5
2010; Details	(Tunisia); Kelibia		Egypt	Round-robin	Tunisia		Algeria	Round-robin	Rwanda	5
2013*; Details	(Nigeria); Abuja		Egypt	Round-robin	Algeria		Nigeria	—N/a		3
2015*; Details	(Egypt); Cairo		Egypt	Round-robin	Algeria		Kenya	—N/a		3
2017*; Details	(Egypt); Cairo		Egypt	3 – 0, 3 – 1	Tunisia		—N/a			2
2018; Details	(Kenya); Nairobi		Egypt	3 – 0	Rwanda		Cameroon	3 – 1	Nigeria	9
2024; Details	(Tunisia); Tunis		Tunisia	3 – 2	Egypt		Algeria	3 – 1	Kenya	4
2025; Details	(Cameroon); Yaoundé	Kenya	3 – 1	Cameroon	Egypt	3 – 0	Senegal	6		

* Notes:

- In 2013, only Algeria, Egypt and Nigeria participated after the withdraw of Tunisia, Sierra Leone and Madagascar.
- In 2015, only Algeria, Egypt and Kenya participated.
- In 2017, only Egypt and Tunisia participated, the tournament was decided in a best of three games.

== Medal summary ==
Rank	Nation	Gold	Silver	Bronze	Total
1	Egypt	8	3	1	12
2	Tunisia	1	3	2	6
3	Algeria	1	2	2	5
4	Nigeria	1	1	1	3
5	Kenya	1	0	2	3
6	Cameroon	0	1	1	2
7	Rwanda	0	1	0	1
7	Seychelles	0	1	0	1
9	Senegal	0	0	1	1
Totals (9 entries)		12	12	10	34

== Participation by nation ==
Nation	(Tunisia) 2002	(Nigeria) 2004	(Egypt) 2006	(Kenya) 2008	(Tunisia) 2010	(Nigeria) 2013	(Egypt) 2015	(Egypt) 2017	(Kenya) 2018	(Tunisia) 2024	(Cameroon) 2025	Years
Algeria	1st				3rd	2nd	2nd			3rd		5
Botswana	5th											1
Burundi											6th	1
Cameroon									3rd		2nd	2
DR Congo									6th			1
Egypt	2nd	1st	1st	1st	1st	1st	1st	1st	1st	2nd	3rd	11
Ivory Coast					5th							1
Kenya				3rd			3rd		5th	4th	1st	5
Mauritius									7th			1
Nigeria		2nd	5th			3rd			4th			4
Rwanda					4th				2nd			2
Senegal	4th	3rd	4th	5th							4th	5
Seychelles			2nd	4th								2
Tanzania									8th			1
Tunisia	3rd		3rd	2nd	2nd			2nd		1st		6
Uganda									9th		5th	1
Total	5	3	5	5	5	3	3	2	9	4	6	

== MVP by edition ==
- 2006 – Nada Ayman (EGY)
- 2015 – Sarah Amin (EGY)

== See also ==
- Men's U21 African Volleyball Championship
