= LNV Ligue A Féminine =

Women's volleyball division

- Current season, competition or edition: 2024–25 LNV Ligue A Féminine
- Sport: Volleyball
- First season: 1941; 85 years ago
- President: Yves Bouget (LNV president); Philippe Peters (LAF representative)
- Administrator: Ligue Nationale de Volley (LNV)
- No. of teams: 14
- Country: France
- Confederation: CEV
- Continent: Europe
- Most recent champion: Levallois Paris Saint-Cloud (2024–25)
- Most titles: RC Cannes (21 titles)
- Broadcaster: Sport en France
- Level on pyramid: Level 1
- Relegation to: Élite Féminine
- Domestic cups: Coupe de France; Supercoupe
- International cups: CEV Champions League; CEV Cup; CEV Challenge Cup
- Website: LNV Ligue A

LNV Ligue A Féminine (LAF) is the top division of French women's volleyball, established in 1941. It is governed by the Ligue Nationale de Volley (LNV), an independent body that runs French professional volleyball under delegation from the French Volleyball Federation (FFVB).
In addition to the usual 14 club participants, the 2018–19 season saw the inclusion of France Avenir 2024, a Toulouse-based development program aimed at nurturing the next generation of French national team players.

== Winners list ==
Years	Champions
1941	Villa Primerose Bordeaux
1942	Villa Primerose Bordeaux
1943	AS Cannes
1944	Not Disputed
1945	Paris UC
1946	Racing Club de France
1947	Racing Club de France
1948	AS Cannes
1949	Montpellier UC
1950	Montpellier UC
1951	Racing Club de France
1952	Montpellier UC
1953	Racing Club de France
1954	Racing Club de France
1955	Racing Club de France
1956	Racing Club de France
1957	Montpellier UC
1958	Montpellier UC
1959	Montpellier UC
1960	Stade Français
1961	Tourcoing Sports
1962	Montpellier UC
1963	Tourcoing Sports
1964	Tourcoing Sports
1965	Racing Club de France
1966	Racing Club de France
1967	Paris UC
1968	Paris UC
1969	Paris UC

Years	Champions
1970	ASPTT Montpellier
1971	ASPTT Montpellier
1972	ASPTT Montpellier
1973	ASPTT Montpellier
1974	ASPTT Montpellier
1975	ASPTT Montpellier
1976	ASU Lyon
1977	ASPTT Montpellier
1978	Paris UC
1979	ASU Lyon
1980	ASU Lyon
1981	CSM Clamart
1982	CSM Clamart
1983	CSM Clamart
1984	CSM Clamart
1985	CSM Clamart
1986	CSM Clamart
1987	Racing Club de France
1988	Racing Club de France
1989	Racing Club de France
1990	Racing Club de France
1991	Racing Club de France
1992	Racing Club de France
1993	VBC Riom
1994	VBC Riom
1995	RC Cannes
1996	RC Cannes
1997	VBC Riom
1998	RC Cannes

Years	Champions
1999	RC Cannes
2000	RC Cannes
2001	RC Cannes
2002	RC Cannes
2003	RC Cannes
2004	RC Cannes
2005	RC Cannes
2006	RC Cannes
2007	RC Cannes
2008	RC Cannes
2009	RC Cannes
2010	RC Cannes
2011	RC Cannes
2012	RC Cannes
2013	RC Cannes
2014	RC Cannes
2015	RC Cannes
2016	AS Saint-Raphaël
2017	ASPTT Mulhouse
2018	Béziers Volley
2019	RC Cannes
2020	cancelled due COVID-19
2021	ASPTT Mulhouse
2022	Volero Le Cannet
2023	Volero Le Cannet
2024	Levallois Paris Saint-Cloud
2025	Levallois Paris Saint-Cloud

== Winners by club ==
rk.	Club	Titles #	Winning years
1	RC Cannes	21	(1995–1996), (1998–2015), 2019
2	Racing Club de France	15	(1946–1947), 1951, (1953–1956), (1965–1966), (1987–1992)
3	Montpellier UC	7	(1949–1950), 1952, (1957–1959), 1962
3	ASPTT Montpellier	7	(1970–1975), 1977
5	CSM Clamart	6	(1981–1986)
6	Paris UC	5	1945, (1967–1969), 1978
7	Tourcoing Sports	3	1961, (1963–1964)
7	ASU Lyon	3	1976, (1979–1980)
7	VBC Riom	3	(1993–1994), 1997
10	Villa Primerose Bordeaux	2	(1941–1942)
10	AS Cannes	2	1943, 1948
10	ASPTT Mulhouse	2	2017, 2021
10	Volero Le Cannet	2	(2022–2023)
10	Levallois Paris Saint-Cloud	2	(2024–2025)
15	Stade Français	1	1960
15	AS Saint-Raphaël	1	2016
15	Béziers Volley	1	2018

== See also ==
- LNV Ligue A Masculine
