= 2011 FIVB Volleyball Women's U20 World Championship =

Volleyball competition

2011 FIVB Women's Junior World Championship
Tournament details
- Host country: Peru
- Dates: July 22–31
- Teams: 16
- Venue(s): Coliseo Eduardo Dibos and Coliseo Gran Chimu (in Lima and Trujillo host cities)

Final positions
- Champions: Italy (1st title)

Tournament awards
- MVP: Caterina Bosetti (ITA)

The 2011 FIVB Women's Junior Volleyball World Championship was held in Lima and Trujillo, Peru from July 22 to 31, 2011.

== Qualification process ==
Confederation	Method of Qualification	Date	Venue	Vacancies	Qualified
FIVB	Host	April 16, 2010		1	Peru
NORCECA	2010 NORCECA Junior Championship	July 3 – 11, 2010	Tijuana, Mexico	3	United States; Dominican Republic; Cuba
CEV	2010 European Junior Championship	September 4 – 12, 2010	Niš/Zrenjanin, Serbia	1	Italy
AVC	2010 Asian Junior Championship	September 12 – 20, 2010	Ho Chi Minh City, Vietnam	3	China; South Korea; Japan
CSV	2010 South American Junior Championship	October 9 – 16, 2010	Envigado, Colombia	1	Brazil
CAVB	2010 African Junior Championship	October 14 – 18, 2010	(Tunisia) Kelibia, Tunez	2	Egypt; Tunisia
CEV	2011 Women's Junior European Volleyball Championship Qualification	May 17 – 22, 2011	Zrenjanin, Serbia	5	Poland; Serbia *
CEV	2011 Women's Junior European Volleyball Championship Qualification	May 17 – 22, 2011	Novalja, Croatia	5	Belgium
CEV	2011 Women's Junior European Volleyball Championship Qualification	May 17 – 22, 2011	Moscow, Russia	5	Russia
CEV	2011 Women's Junior European Volleyball Championship Qualification	May 17 – 22, 2011	Bardejov, Slovakia	5	Slovakia
Total				16	

- Serbia qualified as the best second place of the 2011 Women's Junior European Volleyball Championship Qualification's groups.

== Venues ==
- Coliseo Eduardo Dibos (Lima)
- Coliseo Gran Chimu (Trujillo)

== Pools composition ==
Pool A in Trujillo	Pool B in Lima	Pool C in Trujillo	Pool D in Lima
Peru; Egypt; Tunisia; Slovakia	Brazil; Serbia; Italy; Cuba	United States; Belgium; South Korea; Poland	Japan; Dominican Republic; China; Russia

== First round ==
All times are local (UTC−5).

=== Pool A ===
Pos	Team	Pld	W	L	Pts	SPW	SPL	SPR	SW	SL	SR	Qualification
1	Peru	3	3	0	9	225	142	1.585	9	0	MAX	Pool E (1st–8th)
2	Slovakia	3	2	1	6	213	154	1.383	6	3	2.000	Pool F (1st–8th)
3	Tunisia	3	1	2	2	176	261	0.674	3	8	0.375	Pool G (9th–16th)
4	Egypt	3	0	3	1	202	259	0.780	2	9	0.222	Pool H (9th–16th)

Date	Time		Score		Set 1	Set 2	Set 3	Set 4	Set 5	Total	Report
22 July	19:30	Slovakia	3–0	Tunisia	25–15	25–10	25–14			75–39	P2
22 July	20:15	Peru	3–0	Egypt	25–18	25–17	25–16			75–51	P2
23 July	11:30	Egypt	0–3	Slovakia	20–25	10–25	10–25			40–75	P2
23 July	19:15	Peru	3–0	Tunisia	25–7	25–10	25–11			75–28	P2
24 July	11:30	Tunisia	3–2	Egypt	26–24	25–22	21–25	20–25	17–15	109–111	P2
24 July	18:15	Peru	3–0	Slovakia	25–21	25–22	25–20			75–63	P2

=== Pool B ===
Pos	Team	Pld	W	L	Pts	SPW	SPL	SPR	SW	SL	SR	Qualification
1	Brazil	3	3	0	9	271	207	1.309	9	2	4.500	Pool F (1st–8th)
2	Italy	3	2	1	6	230	199	1.156	7	3	2.333	Pool E (1st–8th)
3	Serbia	3	1	2	3	226	247	0.915	4	7	0.571	Pool H (9th–16th)
4	Cuba	3	0	3	0	175	249	0.703	1	9	0.111	Pool G (9th–16th)

Date	Time		Score		Set 1	Set 2	Set 3	Set 4	Set 5	Total	Report
22 July	16:15	Brazil	3–1	Italy	23–25	25–20	25–18	25–16		98–79	P2
22 July	18:15	Serbia	3–1	Cuba	25–22	23–25	25–17	25–10		98–74	P2
23 July	11:30	Italy	3–0	Cuba	25–16	25–12	26–24			76–52	P2
23 July	19:15	Brazil	3–1	Serbia	23–25	25–15	25–21	25–18		98–79	P2
24 July	09:30	Serbia	0–3	Italy	14–25	15–25	20–25			49–75	P2
24 July	11:30	Cuba	0–3	Brazil	13–25	15–25	21–25			49–75	P2

=== Pool C ===
Pos	Team	Pld	W	L	Pts	SPW	SPL	SPR	SW	SL	SR	Qualification
1	United States	3	3	0	9	245	200	1.225	9	1	9.000	Pool E (1st–8th)
2	Belgium	3	2	1	6	244	241	1.012	6	5	1.200	Pool F (1st–8th)
3	South Korea	3	1	2	2	251	270	0.930	4	8	0.500	Pool G (9th–16th)
4	Poland	3	0	3	1	273	302	0.904	4	9	0.444	Pool H (9th–16th)

Date	Time		Score		Set 1	Set 2	Set 3	Set 4	Set 5	Total	Report
22 July	11:30	Poland	2–3	South Korea	25–22	22–25	26–24	19–25	10–15	102–111	P2
22 July	17:00	United States	3–0	Belgium	25–21	25–18	25–16			75–55	P2
23 July	09:30	Belgium	3–1	South Korea	25–19	25–16	18–25	25–20		93–80	P2
23 July	16:30	United States	3–1	Poland	25–19	16–25	29–27	25–14		95–85	P2
24 July	09:30	Poland	1–3	Belgium	25–20	21–25	24–26	16–25		86–96	P2
24 July	15:30	South Korea	0–3	United States	23–25	14–25	23–25			60–75	P2

=== Pool D ===
Pos	Team	Pld	W	L	Pts	SPW	SPL	SPR	SW	SL	SR	Qualification
1	China	3	3	0	9	244	215	1.135	9	1	9.000	Pool F (1st–8th)
2	Dominican Republic	3	2	1	6	254	241	1.054	6	5	1.200	Pool E (1st–8th)
3	Russia	3	1	2	3	224	233	0.961	4	6	0.667	Pool H (9th–16th)
4	Japan	3	0	3	0	230	262	0.878	2	9	0.222	Pool G (9th–16th)

Date	Time		Score		Set 1	Set 2	Set 3	Set 4	Set 5	Total	Report
22 July	09:30	Japan	1–3	Dominican Republic	14–25	20–25	25–20	22–25		81–95	P2
22 July	11:30	Russia	0–3	China	19–25	19–25	25–27			63–77	P2
23 July	09:30	Dominican Republic	3–1	Russia	17–25	25–21	25–20	25–20		92–86	P2
23 July	17:15	Japan	1–3	China	18–25	25–17	23–25	19–25		85–92	P2
24 July	16:15	China	3–0	Dominican Republic	25–23	25–21	25–23			75–67	P2
24 July	18:15	Russia	3–0	Japan	25–23	25–22	25–19			75–64	P2

== Second round ==
=== Pool E (1st–8th) ===
Pos	Team	Pld	W	L	Pts	SPW	SPL	SPR	SW	SL	SR	Qualification
1	Italy	3	3	0	9	266	229	1.162	9	2	4.500	Semifinals
2	United States	3	1	2	4	259	253	1.024	6	6	1.000	Semifinals
3	Dominican Republic	3	1	2	3	211	228	0.925	4	6	0.667	Classification 5th–8th
4	Peru	3	1	2	2	226	249	0.908	3	8	0.375	Classification 5th–8th

Date	Time		Score		Set 1	Set 2	Set 3	Set 4	Set 5	Total	Report
26 July	18:15	United States	3–0	Dominican Republic	25–11	25–15	25–23			75–49	P2
26 July	20:15	Italy	3–0	Peru	25–23	25–20	25–14			75–57	P2
27 July	18:15	United States	1–3	Italy	23–25	18–25	25–21	20–25		86–96	P2
27 July	20:15	Dominican Republic	3–0	Peru	25–19	26–24	25–15			76–58	P2
28 July	18:15	Italy	3–1	Dominican Republic	25–19	25–22	20–25	25–20		95–86	P2
28 July	20:15	Peru	3–2	United States	21–25	25–19	22–25	25–20	15–9	108–98	P2

=== Pool F (1st–8th) ===
Pos	Team	Pld	W	L	Pts	SPW	SPL	SPR	SW	SL	SR	Qualification
1	Brazil	3	3	0	9	229	176	1.301	9	0	MAX	Semifinals
2	China	3	2	1	6	236	227	1.040	6	4	1.500	Semifinals
3	Belgium	3	1	2	2	212	251	0.845	3	8	0.375	Classification 5th–8th
4	Slovakia	3	0	3	1	240	263	0.913	3	9	0.333	Classification 5th–8th

Date	Time		Score		Set 1	Set 2	Set 3	Set 4	Set 5	Total	Report
26 July	18:15	Brazil	3–0	Belgium	25–22	25–20	25–21			75–63	P2
26 July	20:15	Slovakia	1–3	China	23–25	25–20	23–25	21–25		92–95	P2
27 July	18:15	China	3–0	Belgium	25–19	25–18	25–19			75–56	P2
27 July	20:15	Slovakia	0–3	Brazil	13–25	22–25	12–25			47–75	P2
28 July	18:15	Brazil	3–0	China	29–27	25–19	25–20			79–66	P2
28 July	20:15	Belgium	3–2	Slovakia	17–25	11–25	25–18	25–21	15–12	93–101	P2

=== Pool G (9th–16th) ===
Pos	Team	Pld	W	L	Pts	SPW	SPL	SPR	SW	SL	SR	Qualification
1	Cuba	3	3	0	9	244	188	1.298	9	1	9.000	Classification 9th–12th
2	Japan	3	2	1	6	209	155	1.348	6	3	2.000	Classification 9th–12th
3	South Korea	3	1	2	3	206	220	0.936	4	6	0.667	Classification 13th–16th
4	Tunisia	3	0	3	0	129	225	0.573	0	9	0.000	Classification 13th–16th

Date	Time		Score		Set 1	Set 2	Set 3	Set 4	Set 5	Total	Report
26 July	09:30	Cuba	3–1	South Korea	25–23	18–25	26–24	25–17		94–89	P2
26 July	11:30	Tunisia	0–3	Japan	9–25	15–25	14–25			38–75	P2
27 July	09:30	Japan	3–0	South Korea	25–20	25–13	25–9			75–42	P2
27 July	11:30	Tunisia	0–3	Cuba	15–25	13–25	12–25			40–75	P2
28 July	09:30	Cuba	3–0	Japan	25–20	25–20	25–19			75–59	P2
28 July	11:30	South Korea	3–0	Tunisia	25–17	25–17	25–17			75–51	P2

=== Pool H (9th–16th) ===
Pos	Team	Pld	W	L	Pts	SPW	SPL	SPR	SW	SL	SR	Qualification
1	Russia	3	3	0	8	255	199	1.281	9	2	4.500	Classification 9th–12th
2	Poland	3	2	1	5	249	243	1.025	6	6	1.000	Classification 9th–12th
3	Serbia	3	1	2	5	282	250	1.128	7	6	1.167	Classification 13th–16th
4	Egypt	3	0	3	0	158	252	0.627	1	9	0.111	Classification 13th–16th

Date	Time		Score		Set 1	Set 2	Set 3	Set 4	Set 5	Total	Report
26 July	09:30	Egypt	0–3	Russia	10–25	20–25	11–25			41–75	P2
26 July	11:30	Serbia	2–3	Poland	21–25	17–25	25–14	25–18	11–15	99–97	P2
27 July	09:30	Russia	3–0	Poland	25–19	25–17	25–18			75–54	P2
27 July	11:30	Egypt	0–3	Serbia	16–25	5–25	27–29			48–79	P2
28 July	09:30	Serbia	2–3	Russia	24–26	25–19	19–25	25–20	11–15	104–105	P2
28 July	11:30	Poland	3–1	Egypt	25–14	25–15	23–25	25–15		98–69	P2

== Semifinal round ==
=== Classification 13th–16th ===
Date	Time		Score		Set 1	Set 2	Set 3	Set 4	Set 5	Total	Report
30 July	09:00	Tunisia	0–3	Serbia	14–25	12–25	13–25			39–75	P2
30 July	11:00	South Korea	3–0	Egypt	25–13	25–2	25–17			75–32	P2

=== Classification 9th–12th ===
Date	Time		Score		Set 1	Set 2	Set 3	Set 4	Set 5	Total	Report
30 July	13:00	Poland	3–1	Cuba	25–21	18–25	25–14	25–22		93–82	P2
30 July	15:00	Japan	2–3	Russia	25–23	16–25	17–25	25–17	11–15	94–105	P2

=== Classification 5th–8th ===
Date	Time		Score		Set 1	Set 2	Set 3	Set 4	Set 5	Total	Report
30 July	13:00	Dominican Republic	3–1	Slovakia	25–18	17–25	25–19	25–18		92–80	P2
30 July	19:15	Belgium	1–3	Peru	19–25	25–23	19–25	25–27		88–100	P2

=== Semifinals ===
Date	Time		Score		Set 1	Set 2	Set 3	Set 4	Set 5	Total	Report
30 July	15:00	Italy	3–0	China	25–21	25–20	25–16			75–57	P2
30 July	17:15	United States	2–3	Brazil	15–25	19–25	25–20	25–20	14–16	98–106	P2

== Final round ==
=== 15th place match ===
Date	Time		Score		Set 1	Set 2	Set 3	Set 4	Set 5	Total	Report
31 July	08:30	Tunisia	1–3	Egypt	25–23	25–27	14–25	17–25		81–100	P2

=== 13th place match ===
Date	Time		Score		Set 1	Set 2	Set 3	Set 4	Set 5	Total	Report
31 July	10:30	Serbia	3–0	South Korea	25–19	25–16	25–18			75–53	P2

=== 11th place match ===
Date	Time		Score		Set 1	Set 2	Set 3	Set 4	Set 5	Total	Report
31 July	12:30	Cuba	0–3	Japan	19–25	13–25	22–25			54–75	P2

=== 9th place match ===
Date	Time		Score		Set 1	Set 2	Set 3	Set 4	Set 5	Total	Report
31 July	14:30	Poland	3–1	Russia	25–19	25–19	19–25	25–16		94–79	P2

=== 7th place match ===
Date	Time		Score		Set 1	Set 2	Set 3	Set 4	Set 5	Total	Report
31 July	12:00	Slovakia	3–1	Belgium	25–23	25–12	29–31	25–20		104–86	P2

=== 5th place match ===
Date	Time		Score		Set 1	Set 2	Set 3	Set 4	Set 5	Total	Report
31 July	16:00	Dominican Republic	3–1	Peru	23–25	25–23	25–18	25–18		98–84	P2

=== 3rd place match ===
Date	Time		Score		Set 1	Set 2	Set 3	Set 4	Set 5	Total	Report
31 July	14:00	China	3–1	United States	20–25	25–19	25–16	25–23		95–83	P2

=== Final ===
Date	Time		Score		Set 1	Set 2	Set 3	Set 4	Set 5	Total	Report
31 July	18:00	Italy	3–1	Brazil	21–25	25–13	25–20	25–22		96–80	P2

== Final standing ==
Rank	Team
1st place, gold medalist(s)	Italy
2nd place, silver medalist(s)	Brazil
3rd place, bronze medalist(s)	China
4	United States
5	Dominican Republic
6	Peru
7	Slovakia
8	Belgium
9	Poland
10	Russia
11	Japan
12	Cuba
13	Serbia
14	South Korea
15	Egypt
16	Tunisia

2011 FIVB Women's Junior World champions

Italy
1st title

12–woman Roster
Floriana Bertone, Sara Alberti, Marika Bianchini, Giulia Pisani, Laura Baggi, Carolina Zardo, Erica Vietti, Letizia Camera, Valentina Diouf, Caterina Bosetti, Chiara Scarabelli, Silvia Lotti
Head coach
Marco Mencarelli

== Individual awards ==
- Most valuable player
  - Caterina Bosetti (ITA)
- Best scorer
  - Lise Van Hecke (BEL)
- Best spiker
  - Caterina Bosetti (ITA)
- Best blocker
  - Zhou Yang (CHN)
- Best server
  - Lise Van Hecke (BEL)
- Best setter
  - Yao Di (CHN)
- Best receiver
  - Lucia Nikmonova (SVK)
- Best libero
  - Natalie Hagglund (USA)
