= FIVB Volleyball Women's U21 World Championship =

- Most recent season or competition: 2025 FIVB Volleyball Women's U21 World Championship
- Sport: Volleyball
- Founded: 1977
- No. of teams: 24
- Continent: International (FIVB)
- Most recent champion: Italy (3rd title)
- Most titles: Brazil (6 titles)

The FIVB Volleyball Women's U21 World Championship is the world championship of volleyball for female players under the age of 21 organized by Fédération Internationale de Volleyball (FIVB).

The first tournament was staged in 1977 in Brazil. The second and third tournaments were played at intervals of four years, in 1981 and 1985; with the fourth tournament in 1987 the interval became, and remains, two years. The most recent tournament was jointly hosted by Indonesia and won by Italy.

In March 2022, FIVB decides to change the age category of the tournament by moving it from U20 to U21 in order to equate it with the Men's U21 World Championship. In July 2023, FIVB announced the increase of teams from 16 to 24 and that the tournament would be staged in even-numbered years starting in 2026 in combination with the U17 World Championships, to ensure progressive participation of athletes in their respective age group categories. Subsequently, FIVB decided to discard the 2026 edition, so that after 2025 the next tournament would be in 2028 in order not to congest the calendar of the age group championships.

Brazil is the most successful nation in the tournament's history, with six titles and five runners-up. China is the second most successful with four titles and three runners-up.

A corresponding tournament for male players is the FIVB Volleyball Men's U21 World Championship.

== Results summary ==
#	Year	Host	Final			3rd place match			Teams
#	Year	Host	Champions	Score	Runners-up	3rd place	Score	4th place	Teams
1	1977; Details	(Brazil); São Paulo / Rio de Janeiro / Belo Horizonte / Brasília	South Korea	Round-robin	China	Japan	Round-robin	Brazil	14
2	1981; Details	Mexico City	South Korea	3–1	Peru	Japan	3–0	Mexico	15
3	1985; Details	(Italy); Brescia / Ancona / Reggio Calabria / Fabriano / Perugia	Cuba	3–1	Japan	China	3–1	Brazil	15
4	1987; Details	(South Korea); Busan / Seoul	Brazil	3–0	South Korea	China	3–2	Japan	13
5	1989; Details	(Peru); Lima / Trujillo / Arequipa	Brazil	3–2	Cuba	Japan	3–0	Peru	16
6	1991; Details	(Czechoslovakia); Brno	Soviet Union	3–0	Brazil	Japan	3–1	China	16
7	1993; Details	(Brazil); Brasília / Campinas	Cuba	3–0	Ukraine	South Korea	3–0	Peru	16
8	1995; Details	(Thailand); Bangkok	China	3–0	Brazil	Russia	3–0	Japan	16
9	1997; Details	(Poland); Gdańsk	Russia	3–2	Italy	China	3–0	Japan	16
10	1999; Details	(Canada); Edmonton / Saskatoon	Russia	3–0	Brazil	South Korea	3–2	China	16
11	2001; Details	(Dominican Republic); Santo Domingo	Brazil	3–0	South Korea	China	3–0	Italy	16
12	2003; Details	(Thailand); Suphan Buri	Brazil	3–2	China	Poland	3–0	Netherlands	16
13	2005; Details	(Turkey); Ankara / Istanbul	Brazil	3–1	Serbia and Montenegro	China	3–2	Italy	12
14	2007; Details	(Thailand); Nakhon Ratchasima	Brazil	3–1	China	Japan	3–2	United States	12
15	2009; Details	(Mexico); Mexicali / Tijuana	Germany	3–0	Dominican Republic	Brazil	3–2	Bulgaria	16
16	2011; Details	(Peru); Lima / Trujillo	Italy	3–1	Brazil	China	3–1	United States	16
17	2013; Details	(Czech Republic); Brno	China	3–0	Japan	Brazil	3–0	Italy	20
18	2015; Details	(Puerto Rico); Caguas / Gurabo / Juncos / Maunabo	Dominican Republic	3–2	Brazil	Italy	3–0	Japan	16
19	2017; Details	(Mexico); Boca del Río / Córdoba	China	3–0	Russia	Japan	3–2	Turkey	16
20	2019; Details	(Mexico); Aguascalientes / León	Japan	3–2	Italy	Russia	3–1	Turkey	16
21	2021; Details	(Belgium) (Netherlands); Kortrijk / Rotterdam	Italy	3–0	Serbia	Russia	3–2	Netherlands	16
22	2023; Details	(Mexico); Aguascalientes / León	China	3–2	Italy	Brazil	3–0	Japan	16
23	2025; Details	(Indonesia); Surabaya	Italy	3–2	Japan	Brazil	3–1	Bulgaria	24
24	2028; Details								24

== Medal table ==
Rank	Nation	Gold	Silver	Bronze	Total
1	Brazil	6	5	4	15
2	China	4	3	6	13
3	Italy	3	3	1	7
4	South Korea	2	2	2	6
5	Russia	2	1	3	6
6	Cuba	2	1	0	3
7	Japan	1	3	6	10
8	Dominican Republic	1	1	0	2
9	Germany	1	0	0	1
9	Soviet Union	1	0	0	1
11	Peru	0	1	0	1
11	Serbia	0	1	0	1
11	Serbia and Montenegro	0	1	0	1
11	Ukraine	0	1	0	1
15	Poland	0	0	1	1
Totals (15 entries)		23	23	23	69

== Appearance ==
Team	(Brazil); 1977 (14)	(Mexico); 1981 (15)	(Italy); 1985 (15)	(South Korea); 1987 (13)	(Peru); 1989 (16)	(Czechoslovakia); 1991 (16)	(Brazil); 1993 (16)	(Thailand); 1995 (16)	(Poland); 1997 (16)	(Canada); 1999 (16)	(Dominican Republic); 2001 (16)	(Thailand); 2003 (16)	(Turkey); 2005 (12)	(Thailand); 2007 (12)	(Mexico); 2009 (16)	(Peru); 2011 (16)	(Czech Republic); 2013 (20)	(Puerto Rico); 2015 (16)	(Mexico); 2017 (16)	(Mexico); 2019 (16)	(Belgium) (Netherlands); 2021 (15)	(Mexico); 2023 (16)	(Indonesia); 2025 (24)	Total
Algeria	•	•	•	•	•	•	13th	•	•	•	9th	13th	•	•	•	•	16th	•	•	•	•	•	24th	5
Argentina	11th	8th	•	11th	10th	11th	11th	•	13th	13th	7th	•	•	•	•	•	•	•	12th	11th	11th	9th	7th	13
Australia	•	12th	12th	•	•	•	•	•	•	•	•	•	•	•	•	•	•	•	•	•	•	•	•	2
Austria	•	•	13th	•	•	•	•	•	•	•	•	•	•	•	•	•	•	•	•	•	•	•	•	1
Belarus	Part of Soviet Union						•	•	•	•	•	7th	•	•	•	•	•	•	•	•	9th	•	•	2
Belgium	•	•	•	•	•	•	•	•	•	•	•	•	•	•	•	8th	•	•	•	•	13th	•	•	2
Bolivia	12th	•	•	•	•	•	13th	•	•	•	•	•	•	•	•	•	•	•	•	•	•	•	•	2
Brazil	4th	6th	4th	1st	1st	2nd	7th	2nd	9th	2nd	1st	1st	1st	1st	3rd	2nd	3rd	2nd	5th	6th	7th	3rd	3rd	23
Bulgaria	•	•	9th	7th	•	10th	•	•	•	•	•	•	•	•	4th	•	9th	8th	8th	•	•	•	4th	8
Canada	7th	10th	•	8th	11th	•	•	•	•	9th	•	•	•	•	•	•	•	•	•	•	•	•	17th	6
Chile	•	•	•	•	•	•	•	•	•	•	•	•	•	•	•	•	•	•	•	•	•	•	18th	1
China	2nd	5th	3rd	3rd	5th	4th	9th	1st	3rd	4th	3rd	2nd	3rd	2nd	10th	3rd	1st	9th	1st	7th	•	1st	5th	22
Chinese Taipei	•	•	•	9th	8th	9th	11th	13th	•	•	6th	13th	•	•	5th	•	10th	11th	•	•	•	•	•	10
Colombia	•	•	•	•	12th	•	•	•	•	•	•	•	•	•	•	•	13th	•	•	•	•	•	•	2
Costa Rica	8th	15th	•	•	•	•	•	•	•	•	•	•	•	•	•	•	•	•	•	•	•	•	•	2
Croatia	See Yugoslavia						•	•	•	•	5th	•	9th	10th	•	•	•	•	•	•	•	•	11th	4
Cuba	•	7th	1st	•	2nd	13th	1st	9th	8th	•	13th	13th	•	•	9th	12th	•	13th	15th	14th	•	12th	•	15
Czech Republic	Part of Czechoslovakia							•	6th	7th	9th	•	•	•	11th	•	11th	12th	•	•	•	•	10th	7
Dominican Republic	•	•	•	•	•	•	•	9th	9th	•	9th	•	9th	11th	2nd	5th	8th	1st	11th	13th	8th	14th	20th	14
Egypt	•	•	•	•	•	•	•	•	•	•	•	•	11th	12th	•	15th	14th	16th	16th	15th	12th	13th	21st	10
Finland	•	•	14th	•	•	•	•	•	•	•	•	•	•	•	•	•	•	•	•	•	•	•	•	1
France	•	•	•	12th	•	•	•	•	•	•	•	•	•	•	•	•	•	•	•	•	•	•	•	1
Germany	•	•	•	•	•	8th	5th	8th	7th	•	9th	5th	•	7th	1st	•	•	•	•	•	•	•	•	8
Greece	•	•	•	10th	•	•	•	•	•	•	•	•	•	•	•	•	•	•	•	•	•	•	•	1
Hungary	•	•	•	•	•	•	9th	•	•	•	•	•	•	•	•	•	•	•	•	•	•	•	•	1
India	•	11th	•	•	•	•	•	•	•	•	•	•	•	•	•	•	•	•	•	•	•	•	•	1
Indonesia	•	•	•	•	•	•	•	•	•	•	•	•	•	•	•	•	•	•	•	•	•	•	16th	1
Italy	•	•	7th	•	7th	7th	5th	6th	2nd	9th	4th	•	4th	5th	•	1st	4th	3rd	9th	2nd	1st	2nd	1st	18
Japan	3rd	3rd	2nd	4th	3rd	3rd	7th	4th	4th	6th	•	•	5th	3rd	•	11th	2nd	4th	3rd	1st	•	4th	2nd	19
Kenya	•	•	•	•	•	•	•	•	13th	•	•	•	•	•	16th	•	•	•	•	•	•	•	•	2
Latvia	Part of Soviet Union						13th	•	•	•	•	•	•	•	•	•	•	•	•	•	•	•	•	1
Mauritius	•	•	•	•	•	•	•	•	13th	•	•	•	•	•	•	•	•	•	•	•	•	•	•	1
Mexico	6th	4th	11th	•	16th	•	13th	•	•	9th	•	•	•	•	8th	•	15th	15th	13th	10th	•	8th	23rd	13
Netherlands	•	•	•	•	•	•	•	5th	•	•	•	4th	•	•	6th	•	•	•	•	•	4th	10th	•	5
New Zealand	•	•	15th	•	•	•	•	•	•	•	•	•	•	•	•	•	•	•	•	•	•	•	•	1
Nigeria	•	•	•	•	•	•	•	•	•	13th	•	•	•	•	•	•	20th	•	•	•	•	•	•	2
Paraguay	13th	•	•	•	•	•	•	•	•	•	•	•	•	•	•	•	•	•	•	•	•	•	•	1
Peru	10th	2nd	8th	6th	4th	12th	4th	9th	•	•	•	•	•	•	•	6th	12th	6th	14th	12th	•	•	•	13
Poland	•	•	•	•	•	13th	•	9th	5th	5th	13th	3rd	•	•	13th	9th	•	•	6th	5th	6th	11th	6th	13
Puerto Rico	•	14th	•	13th	15th	•	•	•	•	•	•	13th	8th	9th	•	•	19th	14th	•	•	16th	•	15th	10
Romania	•	•	•	•	•	13th	•	13th	•	•	•	•	•	•	•	•	•	•	•	•	•	•	•	2
Russia	See Soviet Union						•	3rd	1st	1st	•	8th	7th	•	•	10th	6th	7th	2nd	3rd	3rd	•	•	11
Rwanda	•	•	•	•	•	•	•	•	•	•	•	•	•	•	•	•	•	•	•	16th	15th	•	•	2
Serbia	See Yugoslavia						See Serbia and Montenegro							•	•	13th	7th	5th	10th	9th	2nd	7th	14th	8
Slovakia	Part of Czechoslovakia							•	•	•	•	•	•	•	•	7th	•	•	•	•	•	•	•	1
South Korea	1st	1st	5th	2nd	6th	5th	3rd	7th	9th	3rd	2nd	9th	•	•	•	14th	•	•	•	•	•	•	13th	14
Spain	14th	13th	•	•	14th	•	•	•	•	•	•	•	•	•	•	•	•	•	•	•	•	•	•	3
Thailand	•	•	•	•	•	•	•	13th	•	•	•	9th	•	8th	14th	•	18th	•	•	•	14th	15th	12th	8
Tunisia	•	•	•	•	•	•	•	13th	•	•	•	•	•	•	•	16th	•	•	•	•	•	16th	22nd	4
Turkey	•	•	•	•	•	•	•	•	•	13th	8th	9th	6th	•	7th	•	5th	10th	4th	4th	10th	5th	8th	12
Ukraine	Part of Soviet Union						2nd	•	13th	•	•	6th	•	6th	•	•	•	•	•	•	•	•	•	4
United States	5th	•	•	•	•	•	•	•	•	8th	13th	•	11th	4th	12th	4th	17th	•	7th	8th	5th	6th	9th	13
Venezuela	•	•	•	•	13th	13th	•	•	•	13th	13th	9th	•	•	15th	•	•	•	•	•	•	•	•	6
Vietnam	•	•	•	•	•	•	•	•	•	•	•	•	•	•	•	•	•	•	•	•	•	•	19th	1
Discontinued nations
Czechoslovakia	•	•	10th	•	•	6th	•	See Czech Republic																2
Serbia and Montenegro	See Yugoslavia						•	•	9th	9th	•	•	2nd	See Serbia										3
Soviet Union	9th	9th	6th	5th	9th	1st	See Russia																	6

Legend

- 1st – Champions
- 2nd – Runners-up
- 3rd – Third place
- 4th – Fourth place
- • – Did not enter / Did not qualify
- – Hosts
- Q – Qualified for forthcoming tournament

== Most valuable player by edition ==
- 1977–81 – Not awarded
- 1985 – Mireya Luis (CUB)
- 1987 – Ana Moser (BRA)
- 1989–91 – Not awarded
- 1993 – Taismary Agüero (CUB)
- 1995 – Zhang Jinwen (CHN)
- 1997 – Not awarded
- 1999 – Érika Coimbra (BRA)
- 2001 – Jaqueline Carvalho (BRA)
- 2003 – Not awarded

- 2005 – Jovana Vesović (SCG)
- 2007 – Natália Pereira (BRA)
- 2009 – Brenda Castillo (DOM)
- 2011 – Caterina Bosetti (ITA)
- 2013 – Zhu Ting (CHN)
- 2015 – Brayelin Martínez (DOM)
- 2017 – Yang Hanyu (CHN)
- 2019 – Mayu Ishikawa (JPN)
- 2021 – Gaia Guiducci (ITA)
- 2023 – Zhuang Yushan (CHN)
- 2025 – Merit Adigwe (ITA)

== See also ==
- FIVB Volleyball Men's U21 World Championship
- FIVB Volleyball Women's World Championship
- FIVB Volleyball Women's U23 World Championship
- FIVB Volleyball Girls' U19 World Championship
- FIVB Volleyball Girls' U17 World Championship
