= Tunez =

Tunez is a surname. Notable people with the surname include:

- Andrés Túñez (born 1987), Venezuelan footballer
- DJ Tunez, Nigerian musician
- Mateo Túnez (born 1989), Spanish motorcycle rider
