= French Women's Volleyball 2 League =

Élite féminine de volleyball
- Current season, competition or edition: 2023–24 Élite Féminine
- Sport: Volleyball
- First season: 2010
- Administrator: French Volleyball Federation
- No. of teams: 20
- Country: France
- Continent: Europe
- Most recent champion: Terville FOC
- Level on pyramid: Level 2
- Promotion to: LNV Ligue A Féminine
- Domestic cup: French Cup
- Website: LNV.fr

The French Women's Elite Championship or in (French : Championnat de France d'Élite féminine ) (DEF) is the second women's division in French volleyball, it was created in 2010 between the Ligue A and the Nationale 1. At the end of the 2012/2013 season, the division merged with the National 1 to form the Women's Elite Championship.

== Last played season ==
In the 2018–19 season 20 teams has participated, of whom 3 teams promoted to the French Women's Volleyball League and 3 other teams was relegated to the French women's volleyball Third Division.

== Winners list ==
Years	Champion	Runners-up	Third place
2010–11	Terville FOC	Hainaut Volley	VB Tulle Naves
2011–12	Stade-Français-St-Cloud	Albi Volley-Ball - USSP	Quimper Volley 29
2012–13	Terville FOC	Quimper Volley 29	Vandœuvre NVB
2013–14	Vannes Volley-Ball	AS Saint-Raphaël	Vandœuvre NVB
2014–15	Vandœuvre NVB	VBC Chamalières	Quimper
2015–16	Quimper	Évreux Volley-ball	Amiens Longueau Métropole Volley-Ball
2016–17	VBC Chamalières	CSM Clamart	Stella Étoile sportive Calais
2017–18	VB Marcq en Baroeul	MO Mougins	Terville FOC
2018–19	Terville FOC	Istres Ouest Provence Volley-Ball	CSM Clamart
2019–20	competition stopped due to COVID-19		
2020–21			
