= 2005 FIVB Volleyball Women's U20 World Championship =

2005 FIVB Women's Junior World Championship
Tournament details
- Host country: Turkey
- Dates: July 23–31
- Teams: 12
- Venues: 2 (in Ankara / Istanbul host cities)

Final positions
- Champions: Brazil (5th title)

Tournament awards
- MVP: (Serbia and Montenegro) Jovana Vesović

The 2005 FIVB Women's Junior Volleyball World Championship was held in Ankara and Istanbul, Turkey from July 23 to 31, 2005. 12 teams participated in the tournament.

== Qualification process ==
Confederation	Method of Qualification	Date	Venue	Vacancies	Qualified
FIVB	Host			1	Turkey
NORCECA	2004 NORCECA Junior Championship	August 3 – 8, 2004	Winnipeg, Canada	3	United States; Dominican Republic; Puerto Rico
CEV	2004 European Junior Championship	September 3 – 11, 2004	Prešov, Slovakia	4	Italy; Serbia and Montenegro; Russia; Croatia
CAVB	2004 African Junior Championship	September 13 – 15, 2004	Abuja, Nigeria	1	Egypt
AVC	2004 Asian Junior Championship	September 19 – 26, 2004	Colombo, Sri Lanka	2	China; Japan
CSV	2004 South American Junior Championship	October 25 – 29, 2004	La Paz, Bolivia	1	Brazil
Total				12	

== Pools composition ==
Pool A	Pool B
Brazil; United States; Croatia; Turkey; Serbia and Montenegro; Japan	Russia; Egypt; Dominican Republic; Italy; China; Puerto Rico

== Preliminary round ==
=== Pool A ===
Pos	Team	Pld	W	L	Pts	SW	SL	SR	SPW	SPL	SPR	Qualification
1	Brazil	5	5	0	10	15	4	3.750	450	367	1.226	Semifinals
2	Serbia and Montenegro	5	4	1	9	13	8	1.625	470	448	1.049	Semifinals
3	Japan	5	2	3	7	11	11	1.000	482	477	1.010	5th–8th place
4	Turkey	5	2	3	7	9	10	0.900	418	427	0.979	5th–8th place
5	Croatia	5	1	4	6	6	14	0.429	419	451	0.929	
6	United States	5	1	4	6	7	14	0.500	414	483	0.857	

Date	Time		Score		Set 1	Set 2	Set 3	Set 4	Set 5	Total	Report
23 July	15:00	Brazil	3–1	Japan	23–25	25–16	25–18	25–13		98–72	
23 July	15:00	United States	1–3	Serbia and Montenegro	18–25	26–24	23–25	19–25		86–99	
23 July	15:00	Croatia	0–3	Turkey	21–25	16–25	21–25	–	–	58–75	
24 July	15:00	Brazil	3–0	United States	25–19	25–20	25–14	–	–	75–53	
24 July	15:00	Serbia and Montenegro	3–1	Croatia	25–21	25–18	18–25	25–22	–	93–86	
24 July	15:00	Turkey	1–3	Japan	20–25	25–21	20–25	24–26	–	89–97	
25 July	15:00	Japan	2–3	United States	25–15	20–25	25–27	25–19	13–15	108–101	
25 July	15:00	Croatia	1–3	Brazil	22–25	18–25	25–19	21–25	–	86–94	
25 July	15:00	Turkey	1–3	Serbia and Montenegro	18–25	20–25	25–22	15–25	–	78–97	
27 July	15:00	Japan	2–3	Serbia and Montenegro	23–25	25–21	21–25	25–21	13–15	107–107	
27 July	15:00	United States	2–3	Croatia	15–25	25–23	13–25	25–19	13–15	91–107	
27 July	15:00	Turkey	1–3	Brazil	25–17	18–25	19–25	20–25	–	82–92	
28 July	15:00	Croatia	1–3	Japan	23–25	25–23	14–25	20–25	–	82–98	
28 July	15:00	Serbia and Montenegro	1–3	Brazil	14–25	23–25	25–16	12–25	–	74–91	
28 July	15:00	United States	1–3	Turkey	14–25	25–19	22–25	22–25	–	83–94	

=== Pool B ===
Pos	Team	Pld	W	L	Pts	SW	SL	SR	SPW	SPL	SPR	Qualification
1	China	5	5	0	10	15	4	3.750	430	338	1.272	Semifinals
2	Italy	5	4	1	9	14	4	3.500	430	335	1.284	Semifinals
3	Russia	5	3	2	8	10	6	1.667	379	351	1.080	5th–8th place
4	Puerto Rico	5	2	3	7	6	10	0.600	339	362	0.936	5th–8th place
5	Dominican Republic	5	1	4	6	6	12	0.500	380	396	0.960	
6	Egypt	5	0	5	5	0	15	0.000	199	375	0.531	

Date	Time		Score		Set 1	Set 2	Set 3	Set 4	Set 5	Total	Report
23 July	15:00	Russia	3–0	Puerto Rico	25–23	25–23	25–18	–	–	75–64	
23 July	15:00	Egypt	0–3	China	10–25	12–25	15–25	–	–	37–75	
23 July	15:00	Dominican Republic	0–3	Italy	22–25	21–25	21–25	–	–	64–75	
24 July	15:00	Italy	3–0	Puerto Rico	25–18	25–21	25–10	–	–	75–49	
24 July	15:00	China	3–2	Dominican Republic	25–14	25–12	15–25	23–25	16–14	104–90	
24 July	15:00	Egypt	0–3	Russia	20–25	10–25	15–25	–	–	45–75	
25 July	15:00	Egypt	0–3	Puerto Rico	21–25	12–25	13–25	–	–	46–75	
25 July	15:00	Dominican Republic	0–3	Russia	22–25	20–25	18–25	–	–	60–75	
25 July	15:00	Italy	2–3	China	19–25	25–22	25–14	18–25	11–15	98–101	
27 July	15:00	Puerto Rico	0–3	China	22–25	18–25	12–25	–	–	52–75	
27 July	15:00	Russia	1–3	Italy	30–32	20–25	27–25	16–25	–	93–107	
27 July	15:00	Egypt	0–3	Dominican Republic	9–25	17–25	17–25	–	–	43–75	
28 July	15:00	Dominican Republic	1–3	Puerto Rico	18–25	25–22	23–25	25–27	–	91–99	
28 July	15:00	Egypt	0–3	Italy	12–25	11–25	5–25	–	–	28–75	
28 July	15:00	Russia	0–3	China	17–25	23–25	21–25	–	–	61–75	

== Final round ==
=== 5th–8th places ===
5th–8th places
Japan	3
Puerto Rico	1
Russia	1
Turkey	3

5th place
Japan	3
Turkey	1
7th place
Puerto Rico	1
Russia	3

=== Classification 5th and 8th ===
Date	Time		Score		Set 1	Set 2	Set 3	Set 4	Set 5	Total	Report
30 July	15:00	Japan	3–1	Puerto Rico	23–25	25–20	25–23	25–19	–	98–87	
30 July	15:00	Russia	1–3	Turkey	25–19	25–27	16–25	27–29	–	93–100	

=== Classification 7th ===
Date	Time		Score		Set 1	Set 2	Set 3	Set 4	Set 5	Total	Report
31 July	15:00	Russia	3–1	Puerto Rico	25–16	25–21	22–25	25–19	–	97–81	

=== Classification 5th ===
Date	Time		Score		Set 1	Set 2	Set 3	Set 4	Set 5	Total	Report
31 July	15:00	Turkey	1–3	Japan	15–25	25–19	17–25	21–25	–	78–94	

=== Championship round ===
Semifinals
Brazil	3
Italy	2
China	1
Serbia and Montenegro	3

Final
Brazil	3
Serbia and Montenegro	1
Third place
Italy	2
China	3

=== Semifinals ===
Date	Time		Score		Set 1	Set 2	Set 3	Set 4	Set 5	Total	Report
30 July	15:00	Brazil	3–2	Italy	28–26	31–33	21–25	25–19	15–13	120–116	
30 July	15:00	China	1–3	Serbia and Montenegro	23–25	25–17	9–25	20–25	–	77–92	

=== Bronze medal match ===
Date	Time		Score		Set 1	Set 2	Set 3	Set 4	Set 5	Total	Report
31 July	15:00	Italy	2–3	China	19–25	25–16	19–25	25–19	12–15	100–100	

=== Gold medal match ===
Date	Time		Score		Set 1	Set 2	Set 3	Set 4	Set 5	Total	Report
31 July	15:00	Brazil	3–1	Serbia and Montenegro	22–25	25–12	25–16	25–14	–	97–67	

== Final standing ==
Rank	Team
1st place, gold medalist(s)	Brazil
2nd place, silver medalist(s)	Serbia and Montenegro
3rd place, bronze medalist(s)	China
4	Italy
5	Japan
6	Turkey
7	Russia
8	Puerto Rico
9	Dominican Republic
10	Croatia
11	United States
12	Egypt

2005 FIVB Women's Junior World champions

Brazil
5th title

12–woman Roster
Regiane Bidias, Veronica Brito, Adenizia da Silva, Thaisa Menezes, Natalia Manfrin, Camila Torquette, Fernanda Rodrigues, Natasha Farinea, Michelle Pavao, Ana Tiemi Takagui (c), Suelen Pinto, Suelle Oliveira
Head coach
Antonio Neto Rizola

== Individual awards ==
- MVP: (Serbia and Montenegro) Jovana Vesović
- Best scorer: (Japan) Saori Kimura
- Best spiker: (China) Yin Meng
- Best blocker: (Brazil) Adenizia da Silva
- Best server: (Puerto Rico) Barbara Flores
- Best digger: (Italy) Monica De Gennaro
- Best setter: (China) Wei Qiuyue
- Best receiver: (Serbia and Montenegro) Silvija Radovic
