= French Women's Volleyball Cup =

Volleyball in France

- Sport: Volleyball
- Founded: 1986
- Administrator: FFVB
- Country: France
- Continent: Europe
- Most recent champion: Volley Mulhouse Alsace (3rd title)
- Most titles: RC Cannes (20 titles)
- Website: https://www.ffvb.org/

The French Women's Volleyball Cup in (French: Coupe de France de Volleyball Féminin) is a French women's Volleyball competition contested every year since the year 1986 organized and ruled by the French Volleyball Federation (FFVB).

== Competition history ==
=== Winners list ===
Years	Host	Winners	Score	Runners-up
1985/86	Colmar (Haut-Rhin)	CSM Clamart	3-1 (15-2, 15-8, 12-15, 15-13)	VGA Saint-Maur
1986/87	Poitiers (Vienne)	CSM Clamart	x-x	RC France
1987/88	Nîmes (Gard)	RC France	3-0 (15-8, 15-3, 15-12)	RC Cannes
1989	Competition Not Disputed			
1989/90	×××	RC France	x-x	Courrières Sport
1990/91	Paris	VBC Riom	3-2 (12-15, 15-10, 15-8, 11-15, 15-7)	RC France
1991/92	xxx	RC France	3-2 (11-15, 15-7, 6-15, 16-14, 17-15)	VBC Riom
1992/93	xxx	RC France	x-x	VBC Riom
1993/94	Villebon-sur-Yvette (Essonne)	SES Calais	3-1 (15-17, 15-12, 15-5, 15-1)	RC Cannes
1994/95	xxx	VBC Riom	x-x	RC Cannes
1995/96	Paris	RC Cannes	3-2	VBC Riom
1996/97	Paris	RC Cannes	3-2 (16-14, 7-15, 15-6, 12-15, 15-8)	VBC Riom
1997/98	Limoges (Haute-Vienne)	RC Cannes	3-0 (15-4, 15-12, 15-12)	VBC Riom
1998/99	Paris	RC Cannes	3-2	CSM Clamart
1999/20	Paris	RC Cannes	3-0 (25-15, 25-21, 25-15)	ASPTT Mulhouse
2000/01	Paris	RC Cannes	3-0 (25-17, 25-17, 25-18)	USSP Albi
2001/02	Poitiers (Vienne)	RC Villebon 91	3-1 (25-18, 25-18, 19-25, 25-18)	RC Cannes
2002/03	Paris	RC Cannes	3-0 (25-20, 25-21, 25-19)	USSP Albi
2003/04	Riom (Puy-de-Dôme)	RC Cannes	3-0 (25-20, 25-14, 25-19)	RC Villebon 91
2004/05	Cannes (Alpes-Maritimes)	RC Cannes	3-0 (25-14, 25-22, 25-12)	Melun La Rochette
2005/06	Vandœuvre-lès-Nancy (Meurthe-et-Moselle)	RC Cannes	3-0 (25-13, 25-12, 25-14)	USSP Albi
2006/07	Auxerre (Yonne)	RC Cannes	3-1 (25-19, 25-15, 23-25, 25-15)	Melun La Rochette
2007/08	Cannes (Alpes-Maritimes)	RC Cannes	3-1 (25-12, 18-25, 25-15, 31-29)	ES Le Cannet-Rocheville
2008/09	Vandœuvre-lès-Nancy (Meurthe-et-Moselle)	RC Cannes	3-0 (25-14, 25-12, 25-17)	ASPTT Mulhouse
2009/10	Paris	RC Cannes	3-1 (20-25, 25-20, 25-15, 25-16)	ASPTT Mulhouse
2010/11	Paris	RC Cannes	3-0 (25-19, 25-15, 25-21)	ES Le Cannet-Rocheville
2011/12	Paris	RC Cannes	3-0 (25-20, 25-16, 25-18)	ASPTT Mulhouse
2012/13	Paris	RC Cannes	3-1 (24-26, 25-15, 25-20, 25-21)	SES Calais
2013/14	Paris	RC Cannes	3-0 (25-14, 25-16, 25-15)	Volleyball Nantes
2014/15	Paris	ES Le Cannet-Rocheville	3-1 (25-21, 25-22, 19-25, 25-12)	RC Cannes
2015/16	Paris	RC Cannes	3-1 (25-17, 23-25, 25-17, 26-24)	Volleyball Nantes
2016/17	Clermont-Ferrand (Puy-de-Dôme)	Pays d'Aix Venelles	3-2 (12-25, 25-17, 22-25, 25-22, 17-15)	Béziers Volley
2017/18	Paris	RC Cannes	3-1 (16-25, 25-20, 25-20, 27-25)	Béziers Volley
2018/19	Mulhouse (Haut-Rhin)	AS Saint-Raphaël VB	3-1 (20-25, 25-22, 27-25, 25-10)	Volleyball Nantes
2019/20	Cannes	Pays d'Aix Venelles	3-0 (25-22, 25-18, 25-20)	Volero Le Cannet
2020/21	Mulhouse (Haut-Rhin)	ASPTT Mulhouse	3-0 (25-20, 25-19, 25-17)	Istres OPV
2021/22	Paris	Volero Le Cannet	3-1 (25-12, 25-19, 19-25, 25-23)	RC Cannes
2022/23	Paris	Béziers Volley	3-2 (25-22, 21-25, 25-17, 15-25, 15-10)	RC Cannes
2023/24	Paris	Neptunes de Nantes	3-0 (25-19, 25-18, 25-20)	Volley Mulhouse Alsace
2024/25	Chartres	Volley Mulhouse Alsace	3-1 (28-26, 22-25, 25-19, 25-22)	Neptunes de Nantes
2025/26	Paris	Volley Mulhouse Alsace	3-1 (25-20, 25-22, 25-27, 25-15)	Vandœuvre Nancy

=== Honours by club ===
Rk	Club	Finals won First-Last	Finals Lost First-Last
1	RC Cannes	20; 1996-2018	5; 1988-2023
2	Racing Club de France	4; 1988-1993	2; 1987-1991
3	Volley Mulhouse Alsace	3; 2021-2026	5; 2000-2024
4	VBC Riom	2; 1991-1995	5; 1992-1998
5	CSM Clamart	2; 1986-1987	1; 1999
6	Pays d'Aix Venelles	2; 2017-2020	—
7	Neptunes de Nantes	1; 2024	4; 2014-2025
8	ES Le Cannet-Rocheville	1; 2015	2; 2008-2011
8	Béziers Volley	1; 2023	2; 2017-2018
10	SES Calais	1; 1994	1; 2013
10	RC Villebon 91	1; 2002	1; 2004
10	Volero Le Cannet	1; 2022	1; 2020
13	AS Saint-Raphaël VB	1; 2019	—
