= 2013 Women's Junior African Volleyball Championship =

2013 African Junior Women's Championship
Tournament details
- Host country: Nigeria
- Dates: March 14–16
- Teams: 3
- Venue: 1 (in 1 host city)

Final positions
- Champions: Egypt (5th title)

The 2013 Women's Junior African Volleyball Championship was held in Nigeria from 14 to 16 March 2013.

== Teams ==
Originally Tunisia, Sierra Leone, Madagascar, Algeria, Egypt and the hosts Nigeria decided to take part. But later the first three teams withdrew and Algeria, Egypt and Nigeria were the only three teams participating. It was played as a round-robin tournament between the three teams, with the winning team being the champions.

== Round-Robin ==
=== Pool ===
Pos	Team	Pld	W	L	Pts	SW	SL	SR	SPW	SPL	SPR
1	Egypt	2	2	0	6	6	0	MAX	150	110	1.364
2	Algeria	2	1	1	3	3	4	0.750	154	162	0.951
3	Nigeria	2	0	2	0	1	6	0.167	143	175	0.817

Date	Time		Score		Set 1	Set 2	Set 3	Set 4	Set 5	Total	Report
14 Mar	16:00	Algeria	3–1	Nigeria	25–23	25–27	25–16	25–21		100–87	
15 Mar	16:00	Egypt	3–0	Nigeria	25–16	25–21	25–19			75–56	
16 Mar	18:00	Algeria	0–3	Egypt	22–25	21–25	11–25			54–75	

== Final standing ==
Rank	Team
1st place, gold medalist(s)	Egypt
2nd place, silver medalist(s)	Algeria
3rd place, bronze medalist(s)	Nigeria

Qualified for the 2013 World Junior Championship
