= 2015 Women's Junior African Volleyball Championship =

2015 African Junior Women's Championship
Tournament details
- Host country: Egypt
- Dates: February 27 – 01 March
- Teams: 3
- Venue: 1 (in 1 host city)

Final positions
- Champions: Egypt (6th title)

The 2015 Women's Junior African Volleyball Championship was held in Egypt from 27 February – 1 March 2015.

== Round-Robin ==
=== Pool ===
Pos	Team	Pld	W	L	Pts	SW	SL	SR	SPW	SPL	SPR
1	Egypt	2	2	0	6	6	0	MAX	150	68	2.206
2	Algeria	2	1	1	2	3	5	0.600	142	171	0.830
3	Kenya	2	0	2	1	2	6	0.333	141	176	0.801

Date	Time		Score		Set 1	Set 2	Set 3	Set 4	Set 5	Total
27 Feb	16:00	Algeria	0–3	Egypt	17–25	13–25	11–25			41–75
28 Feb	16:00	Kenya	2–3	Algeria	25–19	15–25	21–25	25–17	10–15	96–101
01 Mar	18:00	Kenya	0–3	Egypt	16–25	12–25	17–25			45–75

== Final standing ==
Rank	Team
1st place, gold medalist(s)	Egypt
2nd place, silver medalist(s)	Algeria
3rd place, bronze medalist(s)	Kenya

Qualified for the 2015 World Junior Championship

== Individual awards ==
- Most valuable player
  - Sarah Hanafy (EGY)
- Best spiker
  - Yasmine Abdelrahim (ALG)
- Best blocker
  - Aya Kalid (EGY)
- Best server
  - Carolyne Sirengo (KEN)
- Best setter
  - Doaa Mohamed (EGY)
- Best receiver
  - Zineb Benhamed (ALG)
- Best libero
  - Icel Nadim (EGY)
