= 2013 FIVB Volleyball Women's U20 World Championship =

2013 FIVB Women's Junior World Championship
Tournament details
- Host country: Czech Republic
- Dates: 21 to 30 June 2013
- Teams: 20
- Venues: 2 (in 1 host city)

Final positions
- Champions: China (2nd title)

Tournament awards
- MVP: (China) Zhu Ting

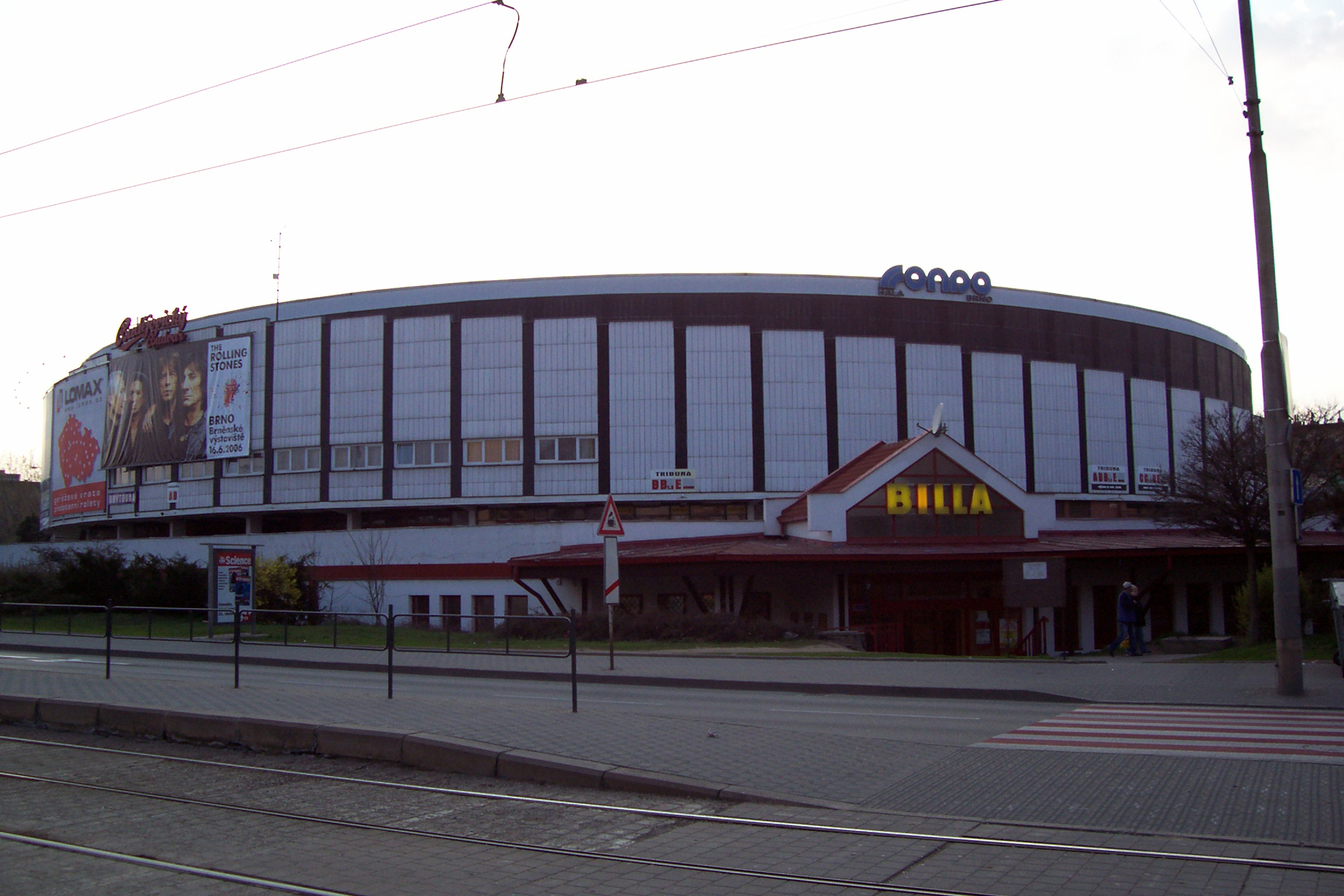

The 2013 Women's Junior Volleyball World Championship was held in Czech Republic, for ten days between from 21 to 30 June 2013. This was the first edition of the tournament that features 20 teams.

== Qualification process ==
Confederation	Method of Qualification	Date	Venue	Vacancies	Qualified
FIVB	Host	March 18, 2012		1	Czech Republic
NORCECA	2012 NORCECA Junior Championship	August 22 – 26, 2012	Managua, Nicaragua	3	Dominican Republic; Mexico; United States
CEV	2012 European Junior Championship	August 18 – 26, 2012	Ankara, Turkey	1	Turkey
AVC	2012 Asian Junior Championship	October 1 – 9, 2012	Nakhon Pathom/Ratchaburi, Thailand	4	China; Chinese Taipei; Japan; Thailand
CSV	2012 South American Junior Championship	October 17 – 23, 2012	Lima, Peru	3	Brazil; Peru; Colombia
CAVB	2013 African Junior Championship	January 11 – 13, 2013	Nigeria	3	Egypt; Algeria; Nigeria
UPV	2013 Junior Pan-American Cup	March 18 – 23, 2013	Havana, Cuba	1	Puerto Rico
CEV	2013 Women's Junior European Volleyball Championship Qualification	May 9 – 12, 2013	Subotica, Serbia	4	Serbia
CEV	2013 Women's Junior European Volleyball Championship Qualification	May 9 – 12, 2013	Samokov, Bulgaria	4	Bulgaria
CEV	2013 Women's Junior European Volleyball Championship Qualification	May 9 – 12, 2013	Cividale del Friuli, Italy	4	Italy
CEV	2013 Women's Junior European Volleyball Championship Qualification	May 9 – 12, 2013	Ramenskoye, Russia	4	Russia
Total				20	

== Competition Formula ==
The 20 teams will be divided into four pools of five teams each and will play a round-robin tournament. The bottom-ranked team of each pool will play classification matches for 17th-20th place in a round-robin system.

The other 16 teams progress to the Eight Finals which consists of a playoff (1st of Pool A against 4th of Pool B etc.). The winners of the playoff matches will advance to the quarterfinals, semifinals and finals to be classified from 1st to 8th while the losers of playoff match will play classification matches, with a similar quarterfinals, semifinals and finals system, to be classified from 9th to 16th.

Pool A	Pool B	Pool C	Pool D
Czech Republic	China	Brazil	Italy
Dominican Republic	Serbia	United States	Turkey
Peru	Japan	Mexico	Egypt
Puerto Rico	Thailand	Russia	Algeria
Chinese Taipei	Colombia	Bulgaria	Nigeria

== Venues ==
Kajot Arena and Mestska Hala Micovych Sportu, Brno, Czech Republic.

== Preliminary round ==
=== Pool A ===
Pos	Team	Pld	W	L	Pts	SPW	SPL	SPR	SW	SL	SR	Qualification
1	Dominican Republic	4	4	0	10	391	335	1.167	12	5	2.400	Final round
2	Peru	4	2	2	8	384	361	1.064	10	7	1.429	Final round
3	Chinese Taipei	4	2	2	6	368	380	0.968	8	9	0.889	Final round
4	Czech Republic	4	2	2	6	279	281	0.993	6	7	0.857	Final round
5	Puerto Rico	4	0	4	0	331	396	0.836	4	12	0.333	

Date	Time		Score		Set 1	Set 2	Set 3	Set 4	Set 5	Total	Report
21 June	12:30	Peru	2–3	Chinese Taipei	25–22	25–22	20–25	24–26	16–18	110–113	P2P3
21 June	17:30	Czech Republic	3–1	Puerto Rico	25–23	22–25	25–14	25–17		97–79	P2P3
22 June	12:30	Puerto Rico	1–3	Peru	26–24	20–25	20–25	20–25		86–99	P2P3
22 June	17:30	Dominican Republic	3–0	Czech Republic	25–13	25–22	25–20			75–55	P2P3
23 June	12:30	Chinese Taipei	3–1	Puerto Rico	25–23	25–16	27–29	25–19		102–87	P2P3
23 June	17:30	Peru	2–3	Dominican Republic	25–18	28–30	25–22	14–25	8–15	100–110	P2P3
24 June	12:30	Dominican Republic	3–2	Chinese Taipei	19–25	25–23	25–19	24–26	15–8	108–101	P2P3
24 June	17:30	Czech Republic	0–3	Peru	19–25	18–25	15–25			52–75	P2P3
25 June	12:30	Puerto Rico	1–3	Dominican Republic	17–25	17–25	25–23	20–25		79–98	P2P3
25 June	17:30	Chinese Taipei	0–3	Czech Republic	17–25	13–25	22–25			52–75	P2P3

=== Pool B ===
Pos	Team	Pld	W	L	Pts	SPW	SPL	SPR	SW	SL	SR	Qualification
1	China	4	4	0	12	300	212	1.415	12	0	MAX	Final round
2	Serbia	4	3	1	8	308	284	1.085	9	5	1.800	Final round
3	Japan	4	2	2	7	330	308	1.071	8	7	1.143	Final round
4	Colombia	4	1	3	3	234	277	0.845	3	9	0.333	Final round
5	Thailand	4	0	4	0	227	318	0.714	1	12	0.083	

Date	Time		Score		Set 1	Set 2	Set 3	Set 4	Set 5	Total	Report
21 June	15:00	Serbia	3–0	Colombia	25–16	25–17	25–20			75–53	P2P3
21 June	20:00	Japan	3–1	Thailand	18–25	25–18	25–16	25–21		93–80	P2P3
22 June	15:00	Colombia	0–3	Japan	18–25	16–25	17–25			51–75	P2P3
22 June	20:00	China	3–0	Serbia	25–20	25–20	25–16			75–56	P2P3
23 June	15:00	Japan	0–3	China	20–25	18–25	22–25			60–75	P2P3
23 June	20:00	Thailand	0–3	Colombia	14–25	17–25	21–25			52–75	P2P3
24 June	15:00	China	3–0	Thailand	25–15	25–10	25–16			75–41	P2P3
24 June	20:00	Serbia	3–2	Japan	25–21	25–21	16–25	21–25	15–10	102–102	P2P3
25 June	15:00	Thailand	0–3	Serbia	18–25	15–25	21–25			54–75	P2P3
25 June	20:00	Colombia	0–3	China	22–25	16–25	17–25			55–75	P2P3

=== Pool C ===
Pos	Team	Pld	W	L	Pts	SPW	SPL	SPR	SW	SL	SR	Qualification
1	Brazil	4	4	0	12	321	240	1.338	12	1	12.000	Final round
2	Russia	4	3	1	8	368	336	1.095	10	6	1.667	Final round
3	Bulgaria	4	1	3	4	307	326	0.942	6	9	0.667	Final round
4	Mexico	4	1	3	3	358	387	0.925	6	11	0.545	Final round
5	United States	4	1	3	3	259	324	0.799	3	10	0.300	

Date	Time		Score		Set 1	Set 2	Set 3	Set 4	Set 5	Total	Report
21 June	12:45	Mexico	2–3	Russia	26–24	22–25	26–24	19–25	9–15	102–113	P2P3
21 June	17:15	United States	0–3	Bulgaria	12–25	21–25	17–25			50–75	P2P3
22 June	12:45	Bulgaria	2–3	Mexico	25–22	18–25	25–16	20–25	11–15	99–103	P2P3
22 June	17:15	Brazil	3–0	United States	25–17	25–18	25–22			75–57	P2P3
23 June	12:45	Mexico	0–3	Brazil	23–25	16–25	15–25			54–75	P2P3
23 June	17:15	Russia	3–1	Bulgaria	25–20	25–19	22–25	25–23		97–87	P2P3
24 June	12:45	United States	3–1	Mexico	29–27	19–25	27–25	25–22		100–99	P2P3
24 June	17:15	Brazil	3–1	Russia	25–16	25–23	20–25	25–19		95–83	P2P3
25 June	12:45	Bulgaria	0–3	Brazil	11–25	11–25	24–26			46–76	P2P3
25 June	17:15	Russia	3–0	United States	25–18	25–14	25–20			75–52	P2P3

=== Pool D ===
Pos	Team	Pld	W	L	Pts	SPW	SPL	SPR	SW	SL	SR	Qualification
1	Turkey	4	4	0	11	335	221	1.516	12	2	6.000	Final round
2	Italy	4	3	1	10	329	222	1.482	11	3	3.667	Final round
3	Egypt	4	2	2	6	243	245	0.992	6	6	1.000	Final round
4	Algeria	4	1	3	2	242	317	0.763	3	11	0.273	Final round
5	Nigeria	4	0	4	1	189	333	0.568	2	12	0.167	

Date	Time		Score		Set 1	Set 2	Set 3	Set 4	Set 5	Total	Report
21 June	15:00	Turkey	3–0	Nigeria	25–15	25–10	25–8			75–33	P2P3
21 June	19:30	Egypt	3–0	Algeria	25–21	25–16	25–20			75–57	P2P3
22 June	15:00	Italy	2–3	Turkey	25–21	23–25	21–25	26–24	9–15	104–110	P2P3
22 June	19:30	Nigeria	0–3	Egypt	9–25	18–25	11–25			38–75	P2P3
23 June	15:00	Algeria	3–2	Nigeria	24–26	19–25	25–16	25–18	15–7	108–92	P2P3
23 June	19:30	Egypt	0–3	Italy	17–25	23–25	16–25			56–75	P2P3
24 June	15:00	Italy	3–0	Algeria	25–12	25–9	25–9			75–30	P2P3
24 June	19:30	Turkey	3–0	Egypt	25–12	25–12	25–13			75–37	P2P3
25 June	15:00	Algeria	0–3	Turkey	18–25	14–25	15–25			47–75	P2P3
25 June	19:30	Nigeria	0–3	Italy	6–25	13–25	7–25			26–75	P2P3

== Final round ==
=== Championship Bracket ===
Round of 16
B1	China	3
A4	Czech Republic	0
C2	Russia	3
D3	Egypt	0
B2	Serbia	3
A3	Chinese Taipei	0
C1	Brazil	3
D4	Algeria	0
D1	Turkey	3
C4	Mexico	0
A2	Peru	0
B3	Japan	3
D2	Italy	3
C3	Bulgaria	1
A1	Dominican Republic	3
B4	Colombia	1

Quarterfinals
B1	China	3
C2	Russia	0
B2	Serbia	0
C1	Brazil	3
D1	Turkey	0
B3	Japan	3
D2	Italy	3
A1	Dominican Republic	0

Semifinals
B1	China	3
C1	Brazil	0
B3	Japan	3
D2	Italy	1

Final
B1	China	3
B3	Japan	0
Third place
C1	Brazil	3
D2	Italy	0

=== Round of 16 ===
Date	Time		Score		Set 1	Set 2	Set 3	Set 4	Set 5	Total	Report
26 June	12:30	Serbia	3–0	Chinese Taipei	25–15	25–18	25–20			75–53	P2P3
26 June	12:45	Turkey	3–0	Mexico	25–14	25–20	25–23			75–57	P2P3
26 June	15:00	Peru	0–3	Japan	20–25	25–27	19–25			64–77	P2P3
26 June	15:00	Russia	3–0	Egypt	25–14	26–24	25–13			76–51	P2P3
26 June	17:15	Italy	3–1	Bulgaria	23–25	25–18	25–14	25–16		98–73	P2P3
26 June	17:30	China	3–0	Czech Republic	25–22	25–13	25–17			75–52	P2P3
26 June	19:30	Brazil	3–0	Algeria	25–10	25–11	25–13			75–34	P2P3
26 June	20:00	Dominican Republic	3–1	Colombia	20–25	25–19	25–20	25–17		95–81	P2P3

=== Quarterfinals ===
Date	Time		Score		Set 1	Set 2	Set 3	Set 4	Set 5	Total	Report
28 June	12:30	Turkey	0–3	Japan	19–25	23–25	21–25			63–75	P2P3
28 June	15:00	Serbia	0–3	Brazil	23–25	20–25	24–26			67–76	P2P3
28 June	17:30	China	3–0	Russia	25–21	25–22	26–24			76–67	P2P3
28 June	20:00	Italy	3–0	Dominican Republic	25–18	25–20	25–22			75–60	P2P3

=== Semifinals ===
Date	Time		Score		Set 1	Set 2	Set 3	Set 4	Set 5	Total	Report
29 June	17:30	China	3–0	Brazil	25–16	25–16	25–22			75–54	P2P3
29 June	20:00	Japan	3–1	Italy	25–19	25–15	21–25	25–17		96–76	P2P3

=== Bronze medal match ===
Date	Time		Score		Set 1	Set 2	Set 3	Set 4	Set 5	Total	Report
30 June	17:30	Brazil	3–0	Italy	28–26	25–21	25–18			78–65	P2P3

=== Gold medal match ===
Date	Time		Score		Set 1	Set 2	Set 3	Set 4	Set 5	Total	Report
30 June	20:00	China	3–0	Japan	25–13	25–17	25–15			75–45	P2P3

=== 5th–8th places bracket ===
Classification 5–8
C2	Russia	3
B2	Serbia	1
D1	Turkey	3
A1	Dominican Republic	2

Classification 5–6
C2	Russia	1
D1	Turkey	3
Classification 7–8
B2	Serbia	3
A1	Dominican Republic	0

=== Classification 5th and 8th ===
Date	Time		Score		Set 1	Set 2	Set 3	Set 4	Set 5	Total	Report
29 June	10:00	Russia	3–1	Serbia	19–25	25–19	25–18	29–27		98–89	P2P3
29 June	12:30	Turkey	3–2	Dominican Republic	26–24	21–25	25–19	19–25	15–13	106–106	P2P3

=== Classification 7th ===
Date	Time		Score		Set 1	Set 2	Set 3	Set 4	Set 5	Total	Report
30 June	12:30	Serbia	3–0	Dominican Republic	25–22	25–10	25–21			75–53	P2P3

=== Classification 5th ===
Date	Time		Score		Set 1	Set 2	Set 3	Set 4	Set 5	Total	Report
30 June	15:00	Russia	1–3	Turkey	23–25	25–10	17–25	16–25		81–85	P2P3

=== 9th and 16th places bracket ===
Classification 9–16
A4	Czech Republic	3
D3	Egypt	2
A3	Chinese Taipei	3
D4	Algeria	0
C4	Mexico	2
A2	Peru	3
C3	Bulgaria	3
B4	Colombia	2

Classification 9–12
A4	Czech Republic	0
A3	Chinese Taipei	3
A2	Peru	0
C3	Bulgaria	3

Classification 9–10
A3	Chinese Taipei	0
C3	Bulgaria	3
Classification 11–12
A4	Czech Republic	3
A2	Peru	2

=== 13th and 16th places bracket ===
Classification 13–16
D3	Egypt	3
D4	Algeria	0
C4	Mexico	1
B4	Colombia	3

Classification 13–14
D3	Egypt	0
B4	Colombia	3
Classification 15–16
D4	Algeria	0
C4	Mexico	3

=== Classification 9th and 16th ===
Date	Time		Score		Set 1	Set 2	Set 3	Set 4	Set 5	Total	Report
28 June	12:45	Chinese Taipei	3–0	Algeria	25–7	25–10	25–13			75–30	P2P3
28 June	15:00	Mexico	2–3	Peru	16–25	15–25	25–17	25–15	12–15	93–97	P2P3
28 June	17:15	Czech Republic	3–2	Egypt	25–13	25–23	24–26	19–25	15–12	108–99	P2P3
28 June	19:30	Bulgaria	3–2	Colombia	7–25	25–23	11–25	27–25	15–11	85–109	P2P3

=== Classification 13th and 16th ===
Date	Time		Score		Set 1	Set 2	Set 3	Set 4	Set 5	Total	Report
29 June	15:00	Egypt	3–0	Algeria	25–14	25–21	25–17			75–52	P2P3
29 June	17:15	Mexico	1–3	Colombia	25–20	19–25	14–25	16–25		74–95	P2P3

=== Classification 9th and 12th ===
Date	Time		Score		Set 1	Set 2	Set 3	Set 4	Set 5	Total	Report
29 June	15:00	Czech Republic	0–3	Chinese Taipei	20–25	20–25	21–25			61–75	P2P3
29 June	19:30	Peru	0–3	Bulgaria	25–27	17–25	21–25			63–77	P2P3

=== Classification 15th ===
Date	Time		Score		Set 1	Set 2	Set 3	Set 4	Set 5	Total	Report
30 June	11:15	Algeria	0–3	Mexico	11–25	17–25	15–25			43–75	P2P3

=== Classification 13th ===
Date	Time		Score		Set 1	Set 2	Set 3	Set 4	Set 5	Total	Report
30 June	13:30	Egypt	0–3	Colombia	13–25	18–25	22–25			53–75	P2P3

=== Classification 11th ===
Date	Time		Score		Set 1	Set 2	Set 3	Set 4	Set 5	Total	Report
30 June	15:00	Czech Republic	3–2	Peru	19–25	22–25	25–20	25–23	17–15	108–108	P2P3

=== Classification 9th ===
Date	Time		Score		Set 1	Set 2	Set 3	Set 4	Set 5	Total	Report
30 June	18:00	Chinese Taipei	0–3	Bulgaria	22–25	13–25	20–25			55–75	P2P3

=== Classification 17th and 20th ===
Pos	Team	Pld	W	L	Pts	SPW	SPL	SPR	SW	SL	SR
1	United States	3	3	0	9	248	177	1.401	9	1	9.000
2	Thailand	3	2	1	6	239	201	1.189	7	3	2.333
3	Puerto Rico	3	1	2	3	197	204	0.966	3	6	0.500
4	Nigeria	3	0	3	0	123	225	0.547	0	9	0.000

Date	Time		Score		Set 1	Set 2	Set 3	Set 4	Set 5	Total	Report
28 June	10:00	Puerto Rico	3–0	Nigeria	25–21	25–18	25–13			75–52	P2P3
28 June	10:30	Thailand	1–3	United States	23–25	25–23	17–25	22–25		87–98	P2P3
29 June	10:30	Nigeria	0–3	United States	8–25	12–25	15–25			35–75	P2P3
29 June	12:45	Puerto Rico	0–3	Thailand	22–25	20–25	25–27			67–77	P2P3
30 June	09:00	United States	3–0	Puerto Rico	25–15	25–22	25–18			75–55	P2P3
30 June	10:00	Thailand	3–0	Nigeria	25–16	25–9	25–11			75–36	P2P3

== Final standing ==
Rank	Team
Gold medal	China
Silver medal	Japan
Bronze medal	Brazil
4	Italy
5	Turkey
6	Russia
7	Serbia
8	Dominican Republic
9	Bulgaria
10	Chinese Taipei
11	Czech Republic
12	Peru
13	Colombia
14	Egypt
15	Mexico
16	Algeria
17	United States
18	Thailand
19	Puerto Rico
20	Nigeria

2013 FIVB Women's Junior World champions

China
2nd title

12–woman Roster
Wang Ning, Li Weiwei, Zheng Yixin, Wang Fengjiao, Qin Siyu, Yang Fangxu, Song Meili, Zhu Ting, Wu Bei, Chen Xintong, Wang Mengjie, Huang Liuyan
Head coach
Xu Jiande

== All-Star Team ==
- Most valuable player
  - Zhu Ting (CHN)
- Best Opposite
  - Ceyda Aktaş (TUR)
- Best Outside Hitters
  - Zhu Ting (CHN)
  - Gabriela Guimarães (BRA)
- Best Middle Blockers
  - Valquíria Carboni Dullius (BRA)
  - Irina Fetisova (RUS)
- Best setter
  - Sladjana Mirkovic (SRB)
- Best libero
  - Manami Kojima (JPN)

== See also ==
- 2013 FIVB Men's Junior World Championship.
