= Dominican Republic women's national under-21 volleyball team =

Dominican Republic
- Association: Dominican Volleyball Federation
- Confederation: NORCECA

Uniforms
Home	Away

FIVB U21 World Championship
- Appearances: 10 (First in 1995)
- Best result: (gold) Gold : (2015)

NORCECA U20 Championship
- Appearances: 10 (First in 1998)
- Best result: (gold) Gold : (2012, 2016)
- www.fedovoli.org (in Spanish)

The Dominic Republic women's national under-20 volleyball team represents the Dominican Republic in international women's volleyball competitions and friendly matches under the age 20 and it is ruled by the Dominican Volleyball Federation That Follow the North, Central America and Caribbean Volleyball Confederation NORCECA and also is a part of The Federation of International Volleyball FIVB

== Results ==
=== FIVB U20 World Championship ===
Champions Runners up Third place Fourth place

FIVB U20 World Championship
Year	Round	Position	Pld	W	L	SW	SL	Squad
(Brazil) 1977	Didn't Qualify							
(Mexico) 1981	Didn't Qualify							
(Italy) 1985	Didn't Qualify							
(South Korea) 1987	Didn't Qualify							
(Peru) 1989	Didn't Qualify							
(Czechoslovakia) 1991	Didn't Qualify							
(Brazil) 1993	Didn't Qualify							
(Thailand) 1995		9th place						Squad
(Poland) 1997		9th place						Squad
(Canada) 1999	Didn't Qualify							
(Dominican Republic) 2001		9th place						Squad
(Thailand) 2003	Didn't Qualify							
(Turkey) 2005		9th place						Squad
(Thailand) 2007		11th place						Squad
(Mexico) 2009		2nd place						Squad
(Peru) 2011		5th place						Squad
(Czech Republic) 2013		8th place						Squad
(Puerto Rico) 2015		1st place						Squad
(Mexico) 2017		11th place						Squad
(Mexico) 2019		13th place						Squad
(Belgium) (Netherlands) 2021		8th place						Squad
Total	1 Title	12/21						----

=== NORCECA U20 Championship ===
Champions Runners up Third place Fourth place

NORCECA U20 Championship
Year	Round	Position	Pld	W	L	SW	SL	Squad
(Mexico) 1998	Group Stages	5th place						Squad
(Cuba) 2000	Quarterfinal	5/6th place						Squad
(Puerto Rico) 2002	Semifinal	4th place						Squad
(Canada) 2004	Final	2nd place						Squad
(Mexico) 2006	Final	2nd place						Squad
(Mexico) 2008	Final	2nd place						Squad
(Mexico) 2010	Final	2nd place						Squad
(Nicaragua) 2012	Final	1st place						Squad
(Guatemala) 2014	Semifinal	Third place						Squad
(United States) 2016	Final	1st place						Squad
Total	2 Titles	10/10						----

=== Pan-American U20 Cup ===
Champions Runners up Third place Fourth place

Pan-American U20 Cup
Year	Round	Position	Pld	W	L	SW	SL	Squad
(Peru) 2011	Final	2nd place						Squad
(Cuba) 2013	Final	2nd place						Squad
(Dominican Republic) 2015	Final	1st place						Squad
(Costa Rica) 2017	Group Stages	7th place						Squad
Total	1 Title	4/4						

== Team ==
=== Current squad ===
The following is the Dominican roster in the 2015 FIVB Volleyball Women's U20 World Championship.

Head Coach: Wagner Pacheco

No.	Name	Date of birth	Height	Weight	Spike	Block	2015 club
1	Jineiry Martínez	3 December 1997	1.90 m (6 ft 3 in)	68 kg (150 lb)	305 cm (120 in)	280 cm (110 in)	(Dominican Republic) Mirador
3	Gaila González	25 June 1997	1.88 m (6 ft 2 in)	73 kg (161 lb)	304 cm (120 in)	276 cm (109 in)	(Dominican Republic) Mirador
4	Vielka Peralta	13 April 1999	1.76 m (5 ft 9 in)	56 kg (123 lb)	275 cm (108 in)	242 cm (95 in)	(Dominican Republic) Deportivo Nacional
7	María García	4 July 1996	1.84 m (6 ft 0 in)	71 kg (157 lb)	296 cm (117 in)	265 cm (104 in)	(Dominican Republic) Mirador
8	Natalia Martínez	25 November 2000	1.86 m (6 ft 1 in)	71 kg (157 lb)	300 cm (120 in)	275 cm (108 in)	(Dominican Republic) Mirador
9	Angelica Hinojosa	19 January 1997	1.86 m (6 ft 1 in)	72 kg (159 lb)	305 cm (120 in)	279 cm (110 in)	(Dominican Republic) Cien Fuego
12	Ayleen Rivero	19 May 1997	1.80 m (5 ft 11 in)	67 kg (148 lb)	240 cm (94 in)	231 cm (91 in)	(Dominican Republic) Deportivo Nacional
13	Massiel Matos	16 April 1998	1.84 m (6 ft 0 in)	66 kg (146 lb)	300 cm (120 in)	292 cm (115 in)	(Dominican Republic) Higuey
14	Yokaty Pérez	6 August 1998	1.78 m (5 ft 10 in)	79 kg (174 lb)	291 cm (115 in)	257 cm (101 in)	(Dominican Republic) Los Cachorros
17	Larysmer Martínez	18 October 1996	1.74 m (5 ft 9 in)	68 kg (150 lb)	288 cm (113 in)	253 cm (100 in)	(Dominican Republic) Deportivo Nacional
19	Lisbeth Rosario	26 May 1999	1.80 m (5 ft 11 in)	73 kg (161 lb)	273 cm (107 in)	265 cm (104 in)	(Dominican Republic) Deportivo Nacional
20	Brayelin Martínez (C)	11 September 1996	2.01 m (6 ft 7 in)	83 kg (183 lb)	330 cm (130 in)	320 cm (130 in)	(Dominican Republic) Deportivo Nacional
