= 2017 FIVB Volleyball Women's U20 World Championship squads =

This article shows the rosters of all participating teams at the 2017 FIVB Volleyball Women's U20 World Championship in Mexico.

== Pool A ==
=== Russia ===
The following is the Russian roster in the 2017 FIVB Volleyball Women's U20 World Championship.

Head coach: Vadim Pankov

No.	Name	Date of birth	Height	Weight	Spike	Block	2017 club
1	Angelina Lazarenko	13 April 1998	1.93 m (6 ft 4 in)	80 kg (180 lb)	320 cm (130 in)	305 cm (120 in)	(Russia) Zarechie Odintsovo
2	Ksenia Smirnova	24 April 1998	1.89 m (6 ft 2 in)	76 kg (168 lb)	305 cm (120 in)	300 cm (120 in)	(Russia) Luch
4	Anna Kotikova	13 October 1999	1.86 m (6 ft 1 in)	75 kg (165 lb)	306 cm (120 in)	300 cm (120 in)	(Russia) Dinamo Kazan
5	Anastasia Stalnaya	6 January 1998	1.90 m (6 ft 3 in)	72 kg (159 lb)	306 cm (120 in)	298 cm (117 in)	(Russia) Severyanka Cherepovets
6	Olga Zubareva	8 November 1998	1.90 m (6 ft 3 in)	74 kg (163 lb)	305 cm (120 in)	272 cm (107 in)	(Russia) Dinamo Krasnodar
7	Alina Podskalnaya	9 June 1998	1.79 m (5 ft 10 in)	65 kg (143 lb)	282 cm (111 in)	272 cm (107 in)	(Russia) Severyanka Cherepovets
8	Aleksandra Oganezova	12 May 1998	1.73 m (5 ft 8 in)	65 kg (143 lb)	287 cm (113 in)	266 cm (105 in)	(Russia) Zarechie Odintsovo
10	Anastasiia Stankevichute	2 May 1998	1.66 m (5 ft 5 in)	63 kg (139 lb)	275 cm (108 in)	235 cm (93 in)	(Russia) Sparta Nizhniy Novgorod
11	Victoria Russu	16 February 1999	1.94 m (6 ft 4 in)	70 kg (150 lb)	311 cm (122 in)	305 cm (120 in)	(Russia) Zarechie Odintsovo
12	Daria Ryseva	5 March 1998	1.75 m (5 ft 9 in)	69 kg (152 lb)	282 cm (111 in)	266 cm (105 in)	(Russia) Zarechie Odintsovo
13	Elizaveta Kotova	31 May 1998	1.87 m (6 ft 2 in)	81 kg (179 lb)	303 cm (119 in)	289 cm (114 in)	(Russia) Zarechie Odintsovo
16	Maria Vorobyeva (C)	24 February 1998	1.86 m (6 ft 1 in)	77 kg (170 lb)	306 cm (120 in)	296 cm (117 in)	(Russia) Ufimochka

=== Mexico ===
The following is the Mexican roster in the 2017 FIVB Volleyball Women's U20 World Championship.

Head coach: Luis Alberto León Lopez

No.	Name	Date of birth	Height	Weight	Spike	Block	2017 club
1	Uxue Guereca	12 February 2001	1.76 m (5 ft 9 in)	64 kg (141 lb)	270 cm (110 in)	259 cm (102 in)	(Mexico) Jalisco
2	Alejandra Tapia	8 March 1998	1.58 m (5 ft 2 in)	57 kg (126 lb)	0 cm (0 in)	0 cm (0 in)	(Mexico) Veracruz
3	Alejandra Salinas	4 April 1998	1.69 m (5 ft 7 in)	63 kg (139 lb)	245 cm (96 in)	240 cm (94 in)	(Mexico) Nuevo Leon
4	Yerania Gutierrez	13 January 1998	1.82 m (6 ft 0 in)	75 kg (165 lb)	275 cm (108 in)	260 cm (100 in)	(Mexico) Colima
7	Karla Mireles	25 January 2000	1.76 m (5 ft 9 in)	73 kg (161 lb)	270 cm (110 in)	250 cm (98 in)	(Mexico) Nuevo Leon
9	Kathya Garcia (C)	6 March 1998	1.78 m (5 ft 10 in)	69 kg (152 lb)	285 cm (112 in)	250 cm (98 in)	(Mexico) Chihuahua
11	Francia Sanchez	28 August 1998	1.82 m (6 ft 0 in)	78 kg (172 lb)	310 cm (120 in)	300 cm (120 in)	(Mexico) Baja California
12	Joseline Landeros	20 December 2000	1.69 m (5 ft 7 in)	60 kg (130 lb)	265 cm (104 in)	249 cm (98 in)	(Mexico) Nuevo Leon
13	Samantha Villegas	8 September 1998	1.78 m (5 ft 10 in)	69 kg (152 lb)	285 cm (112 in)	280 cm (110 in)	(Mexico) UDLA
15	Karen Rivera	22 May 1999	1.74 m (5 ft 9 in)	62 kg (137 lb)	265 cm (104 in)	260 cm (100 in)	(Mexico) Chihuahua
17	Karina Flores	16 August 1998	1.92 m (6 ft 4 in)	80 kg (180 lb)	299 cm (118 in)	285 cm (112 in)	(Mexico) Tigres UANL
20	Alondra Amaro	9 June 1998	1.88 m (6 ft 2 in)	69 kg (152 lb)	275 cm (108 in)	250 cm (98 in)	(Mexico) Durango

== Pool B ==
=== China ===
The following is the Chinese roster in the 2017 FIVB Volleyball Women's U20 World Championship.

Head Coach: Shen Mang

No.	Name	Date of birth	Height	Weight	Spike	Block	2017 club
2	Yang Hanyu	12 October 1999	1.92 m (6 ft 4 in)	72 kg (159 lb)	317 cm (125 in)	311 cm (122 in)	(China) Shandong
3	Chen Peiyan	16 September 1999	1.93 m (6 ft 4 in)	79 kg (174 lb)	318 cm (125 in)	309 cm (122 in)	(China) Guangdong
5	Cai Yaqian (C)	29 June 1998	1.79 m (5 ft 10 in)	69 kg (152 lb)	315 cm (124 in)	308 cm (121 in)	(China) Shandong
6	Zhang Yuqian	18 August 1998	1.85 m (6 ft 1 in)	72 kg (159 lb)	302 cm (119 in)	294 cm (116 in)	(China) Shanghai
7	Xie Xing	28 November 1998	1.84 m (6 ft 0 in)	68 kg (150 lb)	271 cm (107 in)	265 cm (104 in)	(China) Jiangsu
9	Guan Ruige	25 October 1998	1.88 m (6 ft 2 in)	71 kg (157 lb)	311 cm (122 in)	303 cm (119 in)	(China) Beijing
10	Zang Qianqian	14 August 1998	1.74 m (5 ft 9 in)	60 kg (130 lb)	271 cm (107 in)	265 cm (104 in)	(China) Jiangsu
11	Cai Xiaoqing	5 April 1998	1.79 m (5 ft 10 in)	71 kg (157 lb)	305 cm (120 in)	295 cm (116 in)	(China) Henan
12	Wu Han	23 April 1998	1.83 m (6 ft 0 in)	64 kg (141 lb)	294 cm (116 in)	284 cm (112 in)	(China) Jiangsu
14	Fang Jing	27 July 1999	1.77 m (5 ft 10 in)	67 kg (148 lb)	297 cm (117 in)	291 cm (115 in)	(China) Zhejiang
16	Xu Xiaoting	21 January 1998	1.83 m (6 ft 0 in)	72 kg (159 lb)	308 cm (121 in)	300 cm (120 in)	(China) Shanghai
17	Liu Jiayuan	9 May 1998	1.81 m (5 ft 11 in)	80 kg (180 lb)	281 cm (111 in)	276 cm (109 in)	(China) Shandong

=== Peru ===
The following is the Peruvian roster in the 2017 FIVB Volleyball Women's U20 World Championship.

Head Coach: Marco Queiroga

No.	Name	Date of birth	Height	Weight	Spike	Block	2017 club
2	Flavia Montes	22 November 2000	1.87 m (6 ft 2 in)	60 kg (130 lb)	295 cm (116 in)	290 cm (110 in)	(Peru) CV Universidad de San Martín de Porres
5	Nayeli Vilchez	27 June 2000	1.79 m (5 ft 10 in)	65 kg (143 lb)	290 cm (110 in)	287 cm (113 in)	(Peru) CV Deportivo Géminis
6	Maricarmen Guerrero	17 January 1999	1.81 m (5 ft 11 in)	70 kg (150 lb)	290 cm (110 in)	280 cm (110 in)	(Peru) CV Universidad de San Martín de Porres
7	Nicole Abreu	27 March 1999	1.80 m (5 ft 11 in)	63 kg (139 lb)	285 cm (112 in)	270 cm (110 in)	(Peru) CV Universidad César Vallejo
8	Ysabella Sanchez	2 July 1999	1.77 m (5 ft 10 in)	59 kg (130 lb)	279 cm (110 in)	296 cm (117 in)	(Peru) CV Deportivo Géminis
9	Katherine Regalado	11 March 1998	1.90 m (6 ft 3 in)	66 kg (146 lb)	296 cm (117 in)	287 cm (113 in)	(Peru) CV Deportivo Géminis
10	Thaisa McLeod	1 January 2002	1.89 m (6 ft 2 in)	75 kg (165 lb)	301 cm (119 in)	305 cm (120 in)	(Peru) CV Sporting Cristal
11	Kiara Montes	13 January 2001	1.76 m (5 ft 9 in)	68 kg (150 lb)	282 cm (111 in)	293 cm (115 in)	(Peru) CV Sporting Cristal
12	Leslie Leyva (C)	6 December 1998	1.75 m (5 ft 9 in)	72 kg (159 lb)	280 cm (110 in)	300 cm (120 in)	(Peru) CV Universidad de San Martín de Porres
15	Besna Villegas	30 October 1999	1.70 m (5 ft 7 in)	68 kg (150 lb)	270 cm (110 in)	275 cm (108 in)	(Peru) CV Deportivo Géminis
16	Aixa Vigil	23 September 2001	1.80 m (5 ft 11 in)	65 kg (143 lb)	284 cm (112 in)	295 cm (116 in)	(Peru) CV Universidad César Vallejo
17	Yadhira Anchante	19 November 2002	1.78 m (5 ft 10 in)	59 kg (130 lb)	286 cm (113 in)	290 cm (110 in)	(Peru) CV Tupac Amaru

== Pool C ==
=== Brazil ===
The following is the Brazilian roster in the 2017 FIVB Volleyball Women's U20 World Championship.

Head coach: Cabral de Oliveira

No.	Name	Date of birth	Height	Weight	Spike	Block	2017 club
2	Diana Alecrim	22 February 1999	1.94 m (6 ft 4 in)	69 kg (152 lb)	297 cm (117 in)	287 cm (113 in)	(Brazil) Bradesco
3	Lorena Viezel	21 July 1999	1.90 m (6 ft 3 in)	76 kg (168 lb)	309 cm (122 in)	290 cm (110 in)	(Brazil) E.C. Pinheiros
5	Glayce Vasconcelos	28 January 1998	1.89 m (6 ft 2 in)	73 kg (161 lb)	291 cm (115 in)	286 cm (113 in)	(Brazil) SESI São Paulo
6	Nyeme Costa	11 October 1998	1.75 m (5 ft 9 in)	79 kg (174 lb)	297 cm (117 in)	286 cm (113 in)	(Brazil) Bradesco
8	Amanda Sehn	16 July 1998	1.80 m (5 ft 11 in)	64 kg (141 lb)	280 cm (110 in)	270 cm (110 in)	(Brazil) E.C. Pinheiros
11	Karyna Malachias	26 October 1999	1.94 m (6 ft 4 in)	84 kg (185 lb)	305 cm (120 in)	294 cm (116 in)	(Brazil) Bradesco
12	Karina Souza	30 November 1998	1.82 m (6 ft 0 in)	65 kg (143 lb)	294 cm (116 in)	276 cm (109 in)	(Brazil) E.C. Pinheiros
13	Jackeline Santos (C)	30 December 1999	1.74 m (5 ft 9 in)	67 kg (148 lb)	286 cm (113 in)	271 cm (107 in)	(Brazil) Bradesco
16	Julia Bergmann	21 February 2001	1.96 m (6 ft 5 in)	78 kg (172 lb)	301 cm (119 in)	289 cm (114 in)	(Brazil) Abel Brusque
17	Tainara Santos	9 March 2000	1.90 m (6 ft 3 in)	81 kg (179 lb)	306 cm (120 in)	289 cm (114 in)	(Brazil) Hinode Barueri
19	Lorrayna da Silva	19 June 1999	1.85 m (6 ft 1 in)	62 kg (137 lb)	306 cm (120 in)	286 cm (113 in)	(Brazil) E.C. Pinheiros
20	Juliana Moura	21 January 1998	1.81 m (5 ft 11 in)	68 kg (150 lb)	286 cm (113 in)	276 cm (109 in)	(Brazil) Fluminense Vôlei

=== United States ===
The following is the American roster in the 2017 FIVB Volleyball Women's U20 World Championship.

Head coach: Laurie Corbelli

No.	Name	Date of birth	Height	Weight	Spike	Block	2017 club
1	Brionne Butler	29 January 1999	1.95 m (6 ft 5 in)	77 kg (170 lb)	329 cm (130 in)	324 cm (128 in)	(United States) University of Texas
2	Tiffany Clark	18 February 1998	1.80 m (5 ft 11 in)	66 kg (146 lb)	295 cm (116 in)	286 cm (113 in)	(United States) University of Michigan
3	Elizabeth Thayer Hall	28 December 1999	1.91 m (6 ft 3 in)	77 kg (170 lb)	312 cm (123 in)	300 cm (120 in)	(United States) Upward Stars Upstate
4	Paige Hammons	21 October 1998	1.90 m (6 ft 3 in)	61 kg (134 lb)	310 cm (120 in)	298 cm (117 in)	(United States) KIVA Volleyball Club
5	Regan Pittman	18 March 1998	1.95 m (6 ft 5 in)	85 kg (187 lb)	315 cm (124 in)	308 cm (121 in)	(United States) University of Minnesota
6	Holly Carlton	14 May 1998	2.03 m (6 ft 8 in)	80 kg (180 lb)	311 cm (122 in)	301 cm (119 in)	(United States) University of North Carolina
8	Ronika Stone	7 June 1998	1.93 m (6 ft 4 in)	78 kg (172 lb)	315 cm (124 in)	300 cm (120 in)	(United States) University of Oregon
11	Norene Iosia	27 May 1998	1.82 m (6 ft 0 in)	77 kg (170 lb)	304 cm (120 in)	292 cm (115 in)	(United States) University of Hawaii
12	Mackenzi Welsh (C)	19 February 1998	1.85 m (6 ft 1 in)	70 kg (150 lb)	316 cm (124 in)	314 cm (124 in)	(United States) University of Michigan
14	Gabrielle Curry	12 September 1998	1.75 m (5 ft 9 in)	70 kg (150 lb)	271 cm (107 in)	270 cm (110 in)	(United States) University of Kentucky
15	Rachael Kramer	15 March 1998	2.08 m (6 ft 10 in)	78 kg (172 lb)	325 cm (128 in)	313 cm (123 in)	(United States) University of Florida
17	Leah Edmond	13 February 1998	1.93 m (6 ft 4 in)	75 kg (165 lb)	320 cm (130 in)	305 cm (120 in)	(United States) University of Kentucky

== Pool D ==
=== Argentina ===
The following is the Argentinean roster in the 2017 FIVB Volleyball Women's U20 World Championship.

Head Coach: Guillermo Caceres

No.	Name	Date of birth	Height	Weight	Spike	Block	2017 club
1	Valentina Gonzalez	23 February 1998	1.63 m (5 ft 4 in)	56 kg (123 lb)	271 cm (107 in)	260 cm (100 in)	(Argentina) 9 De Julio - Freyre
3	Greta Martinelli	29 April 1998	1.79 m (5 ft 10 in)	67 kg (148 lb)	280 cm (110 in)	269 cm (106 in)	(Argentina) Vélez Sársfield
4	Agustina Oliva	24 September 1998	1.84 m (6 ft 0 in)	72 kg (159 lb)	295 cm (116 in)	284 cm (112 in)	(Argentina) River Plate
7	Azul Benítez (C)	5 February 1998	1.69 m (5 ft 7 in)	57 kg (126 lb)	272 cm (107 in)	263 cm (104 in)	(Argentina) Mar Chiquita
8	Daniela Nielson	7 November 1998	1.70 m (5 ft 7 in)	57 kg (126 lb)	278 cm (109 in)	266 cm (105 in)	(Argentina) Universidad de San Juan
9	Anahi Tosi	19 February 1998	1.83 m (6 ft 0 in)	60 kg (130 lb)	290 cm (110 in)	272 cm (107 in)	(Argentina) 9 De Julio - Freyre
10	Candela Nota	1 March 1999	1.82 m (6 ft 0 in)	60 kg (130 lb)	280 cm (110 in)	271 cm (107 in)	(Argentina) Union San Guillermo
12	Agostina Soria	9 October 1998	1.80 m (5 ft 11 in)	65 kg (143 lb)	279 cm (110 in)	273 cm (107 in)	(Argentina) Vélez Sársfield
13	Julieta Cervini	13 March 1999	1.82 m (6 ft 0 in)	69 kg (152 lb)	283 cm (111 in)	269 cm (106 in)	(Argentina) Vélez Sársfield
14	Agostina Beltramino	25 April 1999	1.81 m (5 ft 11 in)	65 kg (143 lb)	283 cm (111 in)	283 cm (111 in)	(Argentina) Provincial - Rosario
16	Maria Pelozo	19 November 1999	1.80 m (5 ft 11 in)	56 kg (123 lb)	277 cm (109 in)	263 cm (104 in)	(Argentina) Fisherton
18	Fiamma Biain	31 January 1998	1.73 m (5 ft 8 in)	67 kg (148 lb)	279 cm (110 in)	266 cm (105 in)	(Argentina) Union San Guillermo

=== Italy ===
The following is the Italian roster in the 2017 FIVB Volleyball Women's U20 World Championship.

Head Coach: Luca Cristofani

No.	Name	Date of birth	Height	Weight	Spike	Block	2017 club
1	Terry Enweonwu	12 May 2000	1.87 m (6 ft 2 in)	86 kg (190 lb)	339 cm (133 in)	309 cm (122 in)	(Italy) Club Italia
2	Jenninfer Boldini	6 April 1999	1.87 m (6 ft 2 in)	68 kg (150 lb)	297 cm (117 in)	277 cm (109 in)	(Italy) Foppapedretti Bergamo
3	Martina Ferrara	28 January 1999	1.68 m (5 ft 6 in)	70 kg (150 lb)	276 cm (109 in)	260 cm (100 in)	(Italy) Club Italia
4	Rachele Morello	7 November 2000	1.82 m (6 ft 0 in)	77 kg (170 lb)	302 cm (119 in)	296 cm (117 in)	(Italy) Club Italia
5	Marina Lubian	11 April 2000	1.87 m (6 ft 2 in)	67 kg (148 lb)	304 cm (120 in)	288 cm (113 in)	(Italy) Club Italia
6	Giorgia Zannoni	11 February 1998	1.75 m (5 ft 9 in)	68 kg (150 lb)	284 cm (112 in)	270 cm (110 in)	(Italy) Club Italia
7	Elena Pietrini	17 March 2000	1.88 m (6 ft 2 in)	66 kg (146 lb)	315 cm (124 in)	305 cm (120 in)	(Italy) Volleyro' Roma
9	Vittoria Piani (C)	12 February 1998	1.87 m (6 ft 2 in)	76 kg (168 lb)	316 cm (124 in)	296 cm (117 in)	(Italy) Club Italia
10	Alice Pamio	15 January 1998	1.79 m (5 ft 10 in)	66 kg (146 lb)	302 cm (119 in)	278 cm (109 in)	(Italy) Volley Pesaro
11	Giulia Mancini	23 May 1998	1.83 m (6 ft 0 in)	68 kg (150 lb)	302 cm (119 in)	282 cm (111 in)	(Italy) Club Italia
13	Giulia Melli	8 January 1998	1.84 m (6 ft 0 in)	70 kg (150 lb)	304 cm (120 in)	282 cm (111 in)	(Italy) Club Italia
14	Alexandra Botezat	3 August 1998	1.97 m (6 ft 6 in)	75 kg (165 lb)	316 cm (124 in)	304 cm (120 in)	(Italy) Club Italia

=== Turkey ===
The following is the Turkish roster in the 2017 FIVB Volleyball Women's U20 World Championship.

Head Coach: Suphi Doganci

No.	Name	Date of birth	Height	Weight	Spike	Block	2017 club
2	Tuğba Şenoğlu	2 February 1998	1.84 m (6 ft 0 in)	64 kg (141 lb)	275 cm (108 in)	270 cm (110 in)	(Turkey) Beşiktaş
4	Sinem Bayazıt	14 January 1999	1.64 m (5 ft 5 in)	54 kg (119 lb)	270 cm (110 in)	250 cm (98 in)	(Turkey) Sarıyer
5	Ceren Nur Domaç	16 July 1999	1.84 m (6 ft 0 in)	64 kg (141 lb)	296 cm (117 in)	286 cm (113 in)	(Turkey) Eczacıbaşı
6	Saliha Şahin	2 February 1998	1.85 m (6 ft 1 in)	62 kg (137 lb)	282 cm (111 in)	275 cm (108 in)	(Turkey) Karayollari
8	Yasemin Güveli	5 January 1999	1.87 m (6 ft 2 in)	68 kg (150 lb)	300 cm (120 in)	285 cm (112 in)	(Turkey) Beşiktaş
11	Aslihan Kilic (C)	21 April 1998	1.78 m (5 ft 10 in)	71 kg (157 lb)	278 cm (109 in)	277 cm (109 in)	(Turkey) Halkbank
13	Buket Gülübay	28 February 1999	1.83 m (6 ft 0 in)	68 kg (150 lb)	298 cm (117 in)	281 cm (111 in)	(Turkey) Vakıfbank
14	Çağla Erdem	18 June 1998	1.86 m (6 ft 1 in)	74 kg (163 lb)	298 cm (117 in)	285 cm (112 in)	(Turkey) Sarıyer
17	Tutku Burcu Yüzgenç	15 January 1999	1.88 m (6 ft 2 in)	61 kg (134 lb)	298 cm (117 in)	295 cm (116 in)	(Turkey) Halkbank
18	Zehra Güneş	7 July 1999	1.94 m (6 ft 4 in)	82 kg (181 lb)	309 cm (122 in)	292 cm (115 in)	(Turkey) Beşiktaş
22	Eylül Akarcesme	1 October 1999	1.70 m (5 ft 7 in)	53 kg (117 lb)	285 cm (112 in)	270 cm (110 in)	(Turkey) Halkbank
24	Derya Cebecioğlu	24 October 2000	1.85 m (6 ft 1 in)	65 kg (143 lb)	290 cm (110 in)	280 cm (110 in)	(Turkey) Vakıfbank
