= 2016 Asian Women's U19 Volleyball Championship =

2016 Asian Women's U20 Championship

Tournament details
- Host country: Thailand
- Dates: 23–31 July
- Teams: 15
- Venues: 2 (in 1 host city)

Final positions
- Champions: China (12th title)
- Runners-up: Japan

Tournament awards
- MVP: (China) Wu Han

The 2016 Asian Junior Women's Volleyball Championship was held in Nakhon Ratchasima, Thailand from 23 July to 31 July 2016. It acted as the Asian qualifying tournament for the 2017 FIVB Volleyball Women's U20 World Championship.

== Pools composition ==
Teams were seeded in the first two positions of each pool following the Serpentine system according to their final standing of the 2014 edition. AVC reserved the right to seed the hosts as head of Pool A regardless of the final standing of the 2014 edition. All teams not seeded were drawn. Final standing of the 2014 edition are shown in brackets except Hosts who ranked 4th.

Pool A	Pool B	Pool C	Pool D
Thailand (Hosts)	China (1)	Japan (2)	South Korea (3)
Sri Lanka (8)	Kazakhstan (7)	India (6)	Chinese Taipei (5)
Vietnam (10)	Hong Kong (11)	Macau (14)	Australia (13)
	New Zealand (9)	Iran (12)	Philippines (–)

== Venues ==
Final Round Pool A,B,D,E,F	Classification 9th–15th Pool A,C,D,G,H
Nakhon Ratchasima, Thailand
MCC Hall	Rajabhat University Gymnasium
Capacity: 5,000	Capacity: 5,000

== Pool standing procedure ==
1. Number of matches won
2. Match points
3. Sets ratio
4. Points ratio
5. Result of the last match between the tied teams

Match won 3–0 or 3–1: 3 match points for the winner, 0 match points for the loser
Match won 3–2: 2 match points for the winner, 1 match point for the loser

== Preliminary round ==
- All times are Indochina Time (UTC+07:00).

=== Pool A ===
Pos	Team	Pld	W	L	Pts	SW	SL	SR	SPW	SPL	SPR	Qualification
1	Thailand	2	2	0	6	6	0	MAX	150	71	2.113	Pool E
2	Vietnam	2	1	1	3	3	3	1.000	119	99	1.202	Pool E
3	Sri Lanka	2	0	2	0	0	6	0.000	51	150	0.340	Pool G

Date	Time		Score		Set 1	Set 2	Set 3	Set 4	Set 5	Total	Report
23 Jul	18:30	Vietnam	0–3	Thailand	13–25	15–25	16–25			44–75	Report
24 Jul	16:00	Sri Lanka	0–3	Vietnam	8–25	6–25	10–25			24–75	Report
25 Jul	18:00	Thailand	3–0	Sri Lanka	25–8	25–12	25–7			75–27	Report

=== Pool B ===
Pos	Team	Pld	W	L	Pts	SW	SL	SR	SPW	SPL	SPR	Qualification
1	China	3	3	0	9	9	0	MAX	225	104	2.163	Pool F
2	Kazakhstan	3	2	1	6	6	4	1.500	214	205	1.044	Pool F
3	Hong Kong	3	1	2	3	4	6	0.667	185	213	0.869	Pool H
4	New Zealand	3	0	3	0	0	9	0.000	123	225	0.547	Pool H

Date	Time		Score		Set 1	Set 2	Set 3	Set 4	Set 5	Total	Report
23 Jul	14:00	New Zealand	0–3	China	13–25	3–25	12–25			28–75	Report
23 Jul	16:00	Hong Kong	1–3	Kazakhstan	22–25	25–18	20–25	13–25		80–93	Report
24 Jul	14:00	Hong Kong	3–0	New Zealand	25–13	25–9	25–23			75–45	Report
24 Jul	16:00	Kazakhstan	0–3	China	18–25	12–25	16–25			46–75	Report
25 Jul	14:00	China	3–0	Hong Kong	25–7	25–11	25–12			75–30	Report
25 Jul	16:00	New Zealand	0–3	Kazakhstan	17–25	17–25	16–25			50–75	Report

=== Pool C ===
Pos	Team	Pld	W	L	Pts	SW	SL	SR	SPW	SPL	SPR	Qualification
1	Japan	3	3	0	9	9	0	MAX	225	78	2.885	Pool E
2	India	3	2	1	6	6	3	2.000	186	165	1.127	Pool E
3	Iran	3	1	2	3	3	6	0.500	163	190	0.858	Pool G
4	Macau	3	0	3	0	0	9	0.000	84	225	0.373	Pool G

Date	Time		Score		Set 1	Set 2	Set 3	Set 4	Set 5	Total	Report
23 Jul	12:00	Macau	0–3	India	5–25	18–25	7–25			30–75	Report
23 Jul	14:00	Iran	0–3	Japan	7–25	10–25	11–25			28–75	Report
24 Jul	12:00	India	0–3	Japan	12–25	12–25	12–25			36–75	Report
24 Jul	14:00	Macau	0–3	Iran	14–25	10–25	16–25			40–75	Report
25 Jul	12:00	Iran	0–3	India	20–25	19–25	21–25			60–75	Report
25 Jul	14:00	Japan	3–0	Macau	25–5	25–5	25–4			75–14	Report

=== Pool D ===
Pos	Team	Pld	W	L	Pts	SW	SL	SR	SPW	SPL	SPR	Qualification
1	South Korea	3	3	0	9	9	0	MAX	225	139	1.619	Pool F
2	Chinese Taipei	3	2	1	6	6	3	2.000	212	144	1.472	Pool F
3	Philippines	3	1	2	2	3	8	0.375	182	252	0.722	Pool H
4	Australia	3	0	3	1	2	9	0.222	169	253	0.668	Pool H

Date	Time		Score		Set 1	Set 2	Set 3	Set 4	Set 5	Total	Report
23 Jul	16:00	Chinese Taipei	3–0	Australia	25–14	25–12	25–12			75–38	Report
23 Jul	18:30	South Korea	3–0	Philippines	25–17	25–14	25–17			75–48	Report
24 Jul	18:30	South Korea	3–0	Chinese Taipei	25–20	25–20	25–22			75–62	Report
24 Jul	18:30	Philippines	3–2	Australia	15–25	25–21	25–20	23–25	15–11	103–102	Report
25 Jul	16:00	Chinese Taipei	3–0	Philippines	25–13	25–8	25–10			75–31	Report
25 Jul	18:00	Australia	0–3	South Korea	6–25	8–25	15–25			29–75	Report

== Classification round ==
- All times are Indochina Time (UTC+07:00).
- The results and the points of the matches between the same teams that were already played during the preliminary round shall be taken into account for the classification round.

=== Pool E ===
Pos	Team	Pld	W	L	Pts	SW	SL	SR	SPW	SPL	SPR	Qualification
1	Japan	3	3	0	8	9	2	4.500	257	161	1.596	Quarterfinals
2	Thailand	3	2	1	7	8	3	2.667	240	201	1.194	Quarterfinals
3	Vietnam	3	1	2	3	3	7	0.429	177	233	0.760	Quarterfinals
4	India	3	0	3	0	1	9	0.111	169	248	0.681	Quarterfinals

Date	Time		Score		Set 1	Set 2	Set 3	Set 4	Set 5	Total	Report
27 Jul	11:30	Japan	3–0	Vietnam	25–11	25–13	25–11			75–35	Report
27 Jul	16:00	Thailand	3–0	India	25–23	25–15	25–12			75–50	Report
28 Jul	11:30	Vietnam	3–1	India	25–22	23–25	25–21	25–15		98–83	Report
28 Jul	16:00	Thailand	2–3	Japan	25–23	16–25	25–19	13–25	11–15	90–107	Report

=== Pool F ===
Pos	Team	Pld	W	L	Pts	SW	SL	SR	SPW	SPL	SPR	Qualification
1	China	3	3	0	8	9	2	4.500	258	183	1.410	Quarterfinals
2	South Korea	3	2	1	7	8	4	2.000	268	228	1.175	Quarterfinals
3	Chinese Taipei	3	1	2	3	3	6	0.500	180	212	0.849	Quarterfinals
4	Kazakhstan	3	0	3	0	1	9	0.111	166	249	0.667	Quarterfinals

Date	Time		Score		Set 1	Set 2	Set 3	Set 4	Set 5	Total	Report
27 Jul	14:00	China	3–0	Chinese Taipei	25–14	25–18	25–9			75–41	Report
27 Jul	18:00	South Korea	3–1	Kazakhstan	22–25	25–15	25–10	25–8		97–58	Report
28 Jul	14:00	Kazakhstan	0–3	Chinese Taipei	22–25	15–25	25–27			62–77	Report
28 Jul	18:00	China	3–2	South Korea	20–25	25–17	23–25	25–19	15–10	108–96	Report

=== Pool G ===
Pos	Team	Pld	W	L	Pts	SW	SL	SR	SPW	SPL	SPR	Qualification
1	Iran	2	2	0	6	6	0	MAX	150	77	1.948	9th–12th classification
2	Macau	2	1	1	3	3	3	1.000	115	129	0.891	9th–12th classification
3	Sri Lanka	2	0	2	0	0	6	0.000	91	150	0.607	13th–15th classification

Date	Time		Score		Set 1	Set 2	Set 3	Set 4	Set 5	Total	Report
27 Jul	14:00	Sri Lanka	0–3	Macau	21–25	20–25	13–25			54–75	Report
28 Jul	14:00	Sri Lanka	0–3	Iran	13–25	6–25	18–25			37–75	Report

=== Pool H ===
Pos	Team	Pld	W	L	Pts	SW	SL	SR	SPW	SPL	SPR	Qualification
1	Philippines	3	3	0	8	9	3	3.000	276	222	1.243	9th–12th classification
2	Australia	3	2	1	7	8	4	2.000	274	241	1.137	9th–12th classification
3	Hong Kong	3	1	2	3	4	6	0.667	205	218	0.940	13th–15th classification
4	New Zealand	3	0	3	0	1	9	0.111	173	247	0.700	13th–15th classification

Date	Time		Score		Set 1	Set 2	Set 3	Set 4	Set 5	Total	Report
27 Jul	16:00	Hong Kong	0–3	Australia	19–25	21–25	18–25			58–75	Report
27 Jul	18:00	Philippines	3–0	New Zealand	25–15	25–14	25–19			75–48	Report
28 Jul	16:00	New Zealand	1–3	Australia	17–25	25–22	20–25	18–25		80–97	Report
28 Jul	18:00	Hong Kong	1–3	Philippines	25–23	22–25	14–25	11–25		72–98	Report

== Final round ==
- All times are Indochina Time (UTC+07:00).

=== Classification 13th–15th ===
13th–15th places
29 July
Sri Lanka	1
New Zealand	3
29 July
Hong Kong
Bye

13th place
30 July
New Zealand	0
Hong Kong	3

==== 13th–15th semifinal ====
Date	Time		Score		Set 1	Set 2	Set 3	Set 4	Set 5	Total	Report
29 Jul	14:00	Sri Lanka	1–3	New Zealand	25–22	14–25	19–25	24–26		82–98	Report

==== 13th place ====
Date	Time		Score		Set 1	Set 2	Set 3	Set 4	Set 5	Total	Report
30 Jul	14:00	Hong Kong	3–0	New Zealand	25–16	25–19	25–17			75–52	Report

=== Classification 9th–12th ===
9th–12th places
29 July
Iran	3
Australia	2
29 July
Philippines	3
Macau	0

9th place
30 July
Iran	3
Philippines	2
11th place
30 July
Australia	3
Macau	1

==== 9th–12th semifinals ====
Date	Time		Score		Set 1	Set 2	Set 3	Set 4	Set 5	Total	Report
29 Jul	16:00	Iran	3–2	Australia	25–17	21–25	16–25	25–16	19–17	106–100	Report
29 Jul	18:00	Philippines	3–0	Macau	25–21	25–14	25–22			75–57	Report

==== 11th place ====
Date	Time		Score		Set 1	Set 2	Set 3	Set 4	Set 5	Total	Report
30 Jul	16:00	Australia	3–1	Macau	25–18	25–8	23–25	25–21		98–72	Report

==== 9th place ====
Date	Time		Score		Set 1	Set 2	Set 3	Set 4	Set 5	Total	Report
30 Jul	18:00	Iran	3–2	Philippines	25–16	25–19	15–25	14–25	15–10	94–95	Report

=== Final eight ===
Quarterfinals
29 July
Japan	3
Kazakhstan	0
29 July
South Korea	1
Vietnam	3
29 July
China	3
India	0
29 July
Thailand	3
Chinese Taipei	1

Semifinals
30 July
Japan	3
Vietnam	0
30 July
China	3
Thailand	0

Final
31 July
Japan	2
China	3
3rd place
31 July
Vietnam	1
Thailand	3

5th–8th places
30 July
Kazakhstan	0
South Korea	3
30 July
India	0
Chinese Taipei	3

5th place
31 July
South Korea	3
Chinese Taipei	2
7th place
31 July
Kazakhstan	3
India	1

==== Quarterfinals ====
Date	Time		Score		Set 1	Set 2	Set 3	Set 4	Set 5	Total	Report
29 Jul	11:30	Japan	3–0	Kazakhstan	25–10	25–10	25–19			75–39	Report
29 Jul	14:00	China	3–0	India	25–8	25–10	25–11			75–29	Report
29 Jul	16:00	South Korea	1–3	Vietnam	28–30	25–13	20–25	17–25		90–93	Report
29 Jul	18:00	Thailand	3–1	Chinese Taipei	25–23	22–25	25–19	25–18		97–85	Report

==== 5th–8th semifinals ====
Date	Time		Score		Set 1	Set 2	Set 3	Set 4	Set 5	Total	Report
30 Jul	12:00	India	0–3	Chinese Taipei	23–25	17–25	18–25			58–75	Report
30 Jul	14:00	Kazakhstan	0–3	South Korea	17–25	20–25	18–25			55–75	Report

==== Semifinals ====
Date	Time		Score		Set 1	Set 2	Set 3	Set 4	Set 5	Total	Report
30 Jul	16:00	Japan	3–0	Vietnam	25–9	25–11	25–20			75–40	Report
30 Jul	18:00	China	3–0	Thailand	25–17	25–13	25–19			75–49	Report

==== 7th place ====
Date	Time		Score		Set 1	Set 2	Set 3	Set 4	Set 5	Total	Report
31 Jul	12:00	India	1–3	Kazakhstan	25–22	22–25	14–25	10–25		71–97	Report

==== 5th place ====
Date	Time		Score		Set 1	Set 2	Set 3	Set 4	Set 5	Total	Report
31 Jul	14:00	Chinese Taipei	2–3	South Korea	28–26	15–25	25–16	22–25	8–15	98–107	Report

==== 3rd place ====
Date	Time		Score		Set 1	Set 2	Set 3	Set 4	Set 5	Total	Report
31 Jul	16:00	Thailand	3–1	Vietnam	25–11	22–25	25–19	25–8		97–63	Report

==== Final ====
Date	Time		Score		Set 1	Set 2	Set 3	Set 4	Set 5	Total	Report
31 Jul	18:00	Japan	2–3	China	20–25	25–21	22–25	25–14	14–16	106–101	Report

== Final standing ==
Rank	Team
1st place, gold medalist(s)	China
2nd place, silver medalist(s)	Japan
3rd place, bronze medalist(s)	Thailand
4	Vietnam
5	South Korea
6	Chinese Taipei
7	Kazakhstan
8	India
9	Iran
10	Philippines
11	Australia
12	Macau
13	Hong Kong
14	New Zealand
15	Sri Lanka

Qualified for the 2017 U20 World Championship

2016 Asian Junior Women's champions

China
12th title

Team roster

Yang Hanyu, Qian Jingwen, Jiang Jing, Zhang Yuqian, Xie Xing, Cai Yaqian, Ouyang Qianqian, Zang Qianqian, Cai Xiaoqing, Wu Han, Gao Yi, Xu Jianan

Head Coach: Shen Mang

== Awards ==
- MVP:
  (China) Wu Han
- Best setter:
  (Japan) Tamaki Matsui
- Best outside spikers:
  (China) Cai Xiaoqing
  (Japan) Reina Tokoku
- Best middle blockers:
  (China) Xie Xing
  (China) Yang Hanyu
- Best opposite spiker:
  (Thailand) Pimpichaya Kokram
- Best libero:
  (Japan) Yukako Yasui

== See also ==
- 2016 Asian Junior Men's Volleyball Championship
