= 2016 Girls' Youth NORCECA Volleyball Championship =

Tournament details
- Host country: Puerto Rico
- Dates: 2–7 September
- Teams: 8
- Venue: 1 (in 1 host city)

Final positions
- Champions: Dominican Republic (2nd title)
- Runners-up: United States
- Third place: Mexico

Tournament awards
- MVP: Natalia Martínez (DOM)

The 2016 Girls' Youth NORCECA Volleyball Championship was the tenth edition of the bi-annual volleyball tournament. It was held in San Juan, Puerto Rico from 2 to 7 September among eight countries. The Dominican Republic won the tournament and qualified for the 2017 FIVB Girls' World Championship along with the United States. Dominican Republic player Natalia Martínez won the Most Valuable Player award.

== Pool composition ==
Group A	Group B
Puerto Rico	United States
Mexico	Dominican Republic
Costa Rica	Guatemala
Saint Martin	Barbados

== Pool standing procedure ==
1. Number of matches won
2. Match points
3. Points ratio
4. Sets ratio
5. Result of the last match between the tied teams

Match won 3–0: 5 match points for the winner, 0 match points for the loser
Match won 3–1: 4 match points for the winner, 1 match point for the loser
Match won 3–2: 3 match points for the winner, 2 match points for the loser

== Preliminary round ==
- All times are in Eastern Daylight Time

=== Group A ===
Pos	Team	Pld	W	L	Pts	SPW	SPL	SPR	SW	SL	SR	Qualification
1	Mexico	3	3	0	15	226	120	1.883	9	0	MAX	Semifinals
2	Puerto Rico	3	2	1	10	211	127	1.661	6	3	2.000	Quarterfinals
3	Costa Rica	3	1	2	5	165	175	0.943	3	6	0.500	Quarterfinals
4	Saint Martin	3	0	3	0	45	225	0.200	0	9	0.000	5th–8th classification

Date	Time		Score		Set 1	Set 2	Set 3	Set 4	Set 5	Total	Report
2 Sep	14:00	Mexico	3–0	Costa Rica	25–20	25–16	25–16			75–52	P2 P3
2 Sep	20:00	Puerto Rico	3–0	Saint Martin	25–5	25–4	25–4			75–13	P2 P3
3 Sep	16:20	Saint Martin	0–3	Mexico	1–25	6–25	2–25			9–75	P2 P3
3 Sep	20:00	Puerto Rico	3–0	Costa Rica	25–10	25–3	27–25			77–38	P2 P3
4 Sep	14:00	Costa Rica	3–0	Saint Martin	25–8	25–7	25–8			75–23	P2 P3
4 Sep	20:00	Puerto Rico	0–3	Mexico	18–25	17–25	24–26			59–76	P2 P3

=== Group B ===
Pos	Team	Pld	W	L	Pts	SPW	SPL	SPR	SW	SL	SR	Qualification
1	United States	3	3	0	13	253	176	1.438	9	2	4.500	Semifinals
2	Dominican Republic	3	2	1	12	260	166	1.566	8	3	2.667	Quarterfinals
3	Guatemala	3	1	2	4	153	240	0.638	3	7	0.429	Quarterfinals
4	Barbados	3	0	3	1	158	242	0.653	1	9	0.111	5th–8th classification

Date	Time		Score		Set 1	Set 2	Set 3	Set 4	Set 5	Total	Report
2 Sep	16:00	United States	3–0	Guatemala	25–12	25–12	25–10			75–34	P2 P3
2 Sep	18:00	Dominican Republic	3–0	Barbados	25–10	25–13	25–13			75–36	P2 P3
3 Sep	14:00	Barbados	0–3	United States	13–25	8–25	11–25			32–75	P2 P3
3 Sep	18:00	Guatemala	0–3	Dominican Republic	7–25	9–25	11–25			27–75	P2 P3
4 Sep	16:00	Barbados	1–3	Guatemala	25–16	24–26	23–25	18–25		90–92	P2 P3
4 Sep	18:00	United States	3–2	Dominican Republic	25–23	14–25	23–25	25–23	16–14	103–110	P2 P3

== Final round ==
=== Bracket ===
Quarterfinals
Dominican Republic	3
Costa Rica	0
Puerto Rico	3
Guatemala	0

Semifinals
Mexico	0
Dominican Republic	3
United States	3
Puerto Rico	2

Finals
Dominican Republic	3
United States	2
Third place
Mexico	3
Puerto Rico	0

Consolation semifinals
Barbados	0
Costa Rica	3
Saint Martin	0
Guatemala	3

7th place
Barbados	3
Saint Martin	0
5th place
Costa Rica	3
Guatemala	1

=== Quarterfinals ===
Date	Time		Score		Set 1	Set 2	Set 3	Set 4	Set 5	Total	Report
5 Sep	18:00	Dominican Republic	3–0	Costa Rica	25–15	25–11	25–17			75–43	P2 P3
5 Sep	20:00	Puerto Rico	3–0	Guatemala	25–10	25–21	25–15			75–46	P2 P3

=== 5th–8th Classification ===
Date	Time		Score		Set 1	Set 2	Set 3	Set 4	Set 5	Total	Report
6 Sep	14:00	Barbados	0–3	Costa Rica	10–25	9–25	12–25			31–75	P2 P3
6 Sep	16:00	Saint Martin	0–3	Guatemala	10–25	7–25	7–25			24–75	P2 P3

=== Semifinals ===
Date	Time		Score		Set 1	Set 2	Set 3	Set 4	Set 5	Total	Report
6 Sep	20:00	United States	3–2	Puerto Rico	19–25	25–21	25–20	20–25	15–10	104–101	P2 P3
6 Sep	18:00	Mexico	0–3	Dominican Republic	18–25	16–25	21–25			55–75	P2 P3

=== 7th place ===
Date	Time		Score		Set 1	Set 2	Set 3	Set 4	Set 5	Total	Report
7 Sep	14:00	Barbados	3–0	Saint Martin	25–12	25–4	25–8			75–24	P2 P3

=== 5th place ===
Date	Time		Score		Set 1	Set 2	Set 3	Set 4	Set 5	Total	Report
7 Sep	16:00	Costa Rica	3–1	Guatemala	21–25	25–15	25–22	25–23		96–85	P2 P3

=== 3rd place ===
Date	Time		Score		Set 1	Set 2	Set 3	Set 4	Set 5	Total	Report
7 Sep	18:00	Puerto Rico	0–3	Mexico	20–25	18–25	19–25			57–75	P2 P3

=== Final ===
Date	Time		Score		Set 1	Set 2	Set 3	Set 4	Set 5	Total	Report
7 Sep	20:00	United States	2–3	Dominican Republic	25–18	25–17	22–25	20–25	13–15	105–100	P2 P3

== Finals standing ==
Qualified to 2017 FIVB Girls' World Championship.

Rank	Team
1st place, gold medalist(s)	Dominican Republic
2nd place, silver medalist(s)	United States
3rd place, bronze medalist(s)	Mexico
4	Puerto Rico
5	Costa Rica
6	Guatemala
7	Barbados
8	Saint Martin

== Individual awards ==
- Most valuable player
  - Natalia Martínez (DOM)
- Best setter
  - Camila de la Rosa (DOM)
- Best Opposite
  - Yanlis Féliz (DOM)
- Best Outside Hitters
  - Madeline Guillén (DOM)
  - Haley Warner (USA)
- Best Middle Blockers
  - Geraldine González (DOM)
  - Loraine López (PUR)
- Best libero
  - Joseline Landeros (MEX)
- Best digger
  - María José Castro (CRC)
- Best receiver
  - Joseline Landeros (MEX)
- Best server
  - Sofía Castro (PUR)
- Best scorer
  - Natalia Martínez (DOM)
