= Alejandra Isiordia =

Mexican volleyball player (born 1994)

Personal information
- Nationality: Mexican
- Born: 17 April 1994 (age 32)
- Height: 184 cm (6 ft 0 in)
- Weight: 72 kg (159 lb)
- Spike: 283 cm (111 in)
- Block: 274 cm (108 in)

Career
Years	Teams
2014	Baja California

National team
2014	Mexico
Honours
Junior Pan American Cup
Gold medal – first place	2013 Havana	Team
U18 Pan American Cup
Silver medal – second place	2011 Tijuana	Team

Alejandra Isiordia (born 17 April 1994) is a Mexican female volleyball player. She is part of the Mexico women's national volleyball team.

She participated in the 2014 FIVB Volleyball World Grand Prix. On club level she played for Baja California in 2014.
