= Natalia Martínez =

Dominican volleyball player

Personal information
- Nationality: Dominican
- Born: November 25, 2000 (age 25); Santo Domingo, Dominican Republic
- Hometown: Santo Domingo
- Height: 1.86 m (6 ft 1 in)
- Weight: 71 kg (157 lb)
- Spike: 300 cm (118 in)
- Block: 275 cm (108 in)

Volleyball information
- Position: Outside hitter
Honours
Women's volleyball
Representing the Dominican Republic
FIVB U20 World Championship
Gold medal – first place	2015 Puerto Rico	Team
FIVB U18 World Championship
Silver medal – second place	2017 Argentina	Team
Junior NORCECA Championship
Gold medal – first place	2016 Fort Lauderdale	Team
Bolivarian Games
Gold medal – first place	2017 Santa Marta	Team
Silver medal – second place	2022 Valledupar	Team

Natalia Martínez (born November 25, 2000) is a Dominican Republic female volleyball player. With her club Mirador she competed at the 2015 FIVB Club World Championship.

She won the 2015 FIVB U20 World Championship gold medal and silver in the 2017 FIVB U18 World Championship.

== Career ==
=== 2014 ===
Martínez helped her home country to win for the first time Youth NORCECA Championship defeating the United States and qualifying for the 2015 FIVB Girls' World Championship at the time she was decorated with the Most Valuable Player award. She later won the U23 Pan-American Cup, defeating 3-1 Colombia in the final match.

=== 2015 ===
Martínez played with the Dominican club Mirador the FIVB Club World Championship, and her club lost its two matches 1–3 to the Swiss Voléro Zürich and 0–3 to the Brazilian Rexona Ades Rio and finally ranking tied-fifth with the Japanese Hisamitsu Springs. With her U18 national team, she played the FIVB U18 World Championship in Peru in July, helping his nation to reach the 17th place in the tournament. She later won the FIVB U20 World Championship gold medal, the first ever volleyball title for the Dominican Republic, after performing 6–0 after the pool play.

=== 2016 ===
The Dominican Republic won the NORCECA Junior Championship and qualified to the 2017 FIVB Women's Junior World Championship led by Martínez who won the Most Valuable Player. She later guided her U18 national team to qualify for the 2017 FIVB Girls' World Championship and the gold medal in the NORCECA Youth Championship being awarded Most Valuable Player and Best Scorer.

=== 2017 ===
Martínez played the 2017 FIVB U20 World Championship were her team could only rank 11th, and the 2017 FIVB U23 World Championship in Ljubljana, Slovenia, losing 2-4 the bronze medal to Bulgaria. She won the 2017 FIVB U18 World Championship silver medal when her team lost 1–3 to Italy in the final match. She won the U23 tournament gold medal played in the 2017 Bolivarian Games.

== Clubs ==
- (Dominican Republic) Mirador (2015)
- (Indonesia) Jakarta Elektrik PLN (2022)

== Awards ==
=== Individuals ===
- 2014 NORCECA Youth Championship "Most Valuable Player"
- 2015 Youth Pan American Cup "Best Server"
- 2016 NORCECA Junior Championship "Most Valuable Player"
- 2016 NORCECA Youth Championship "Most Valuable Player"
- 2016 NORCECA Youth Championship "Best Scorer"
