= 2013 Women's Junior Pan-American Volleyball Cup =

Tournament details
- Host country: Cuba
- Dates: March 18 – 23, 2013
- Teams: 8
- Venue: 1 (in Havana host cities)

Final positions
- Champions: Mexico (1st title)

Tournament awards
- MVP: (Mexico) Alejandra Isiordia

The 2013 Women's Junior Pan-American Volleyball Cup was the second edition of the bi-annual women's volleyball tournament, played by eight countries from March 18 – 23, 2013 in Havana, Cuba.

This was the last qualifier to the 2013 FIVB Women's Junior World Championship for American teams, Puerto Rico earned the last berth winning Pool B over hosts Cuba

== Competing nations ==
Teams who were able to participate in this tournament are those who took part at their respective continental junior championships, South America and NORCECA. Puerto Rico entered after Argentina declined to participate and Guatemala and Nicaragua failed to apply.

Pool A (Already Qualified Teams)	Pool B (Non-Qualified Teams)
Peru; Dominican Republic; Mexico; Colombia	Cuba; Chile; Costa Rica; Puerto Rico

== Competition format ==
The competition format for the 2013 Junior Pan American Volleyball Cup divides the 8 participating teams in 2 groups of 4, a seeded group consisting of countries already qualified to the 2013 FIVB Women's Junior World Championship, and another group of non-qualified countries. Both groups will play a Round-Robyn round after which the best team from Group B will earn the last berth to the World Championship.

The best two teams from Group A will advance to the semifinals, the best two teams from Group B will play the quarterfinals against the worst two teams from Pool A. The worst two from Group B will play the classification matches from 5th to 8th.

=== Pool standing procedure ===
Match won 3–0: 5 points for the winner, 0 point for the loser
Match won 3–1: 4 points for the winner, 1 points for the loser
Match won 3–2: 3 points for the winner, 2 points for the loser
In case of tie, the teams were classified according to the following criteria:
points ratio and sets ratio

== Preliminary round ==
=== Group A ===
Pos	Team	Pld	W	L	Pts	SPW	SPL	SPR	SW	SL	SR	Qualification
1	Mexico	3	3	0	14	252	208	1.212	9	1	9.000	Semifinals
2	Dominican Republic	3	2	1	10	252	218	1.156	7	4	1.750	Semifinals
3	Colombia	3	1	2	5	242	265	0.913	4	7	0.571	Quarterfinals
4	Peru	3	0	3	1	195	250	0.780	1	9	0.111	Quarterfinals

Date	Time		Score		Set 1	Set 2	Set 3	Set 4	Set 5	Total	Report
18 Mar	16:00	Mexico	3–0	Colombia	25–22	25–20	30–28			80–70	P2 P3
18 Mar	18:00	Peru	0–3	Dominican Republic	20–25	16–25	13–25			49–75	P2 P3
19 Mar	14:00	Peru	1–3	Colombia	22–25	22–25	25–22	21–25		90–97	P2 P3
19 Mar	16:00	Dominican Republic	1–3	Mexico	25–19	21–25	21–25	19–25		86–94	P2 P3
20 Mar	14:00	Dominican Republic	3–1	Colombia	25–10	20–25	25–17	25–23		95–75	P2 P3
20 Mar	16:00	Mexico	3–0	Peru	25–18	25–12	28–26			78–56	P2 P3

=== Group B ===
Pos	Team	Pld	W	L	Pts	SPW	SPL	SPR	SW	SL	SR	Qualification
1	Puerto Rico	3	3	0	13	261	186	1.403	9	2	4.500	Quarterfinals
2	Cuba	3	2	1	10	210	183	1.148	6	3	2.000	Quarterfinals
3	Chile	3	1	2	7	238	229	1.039	5	6	0.833	
4	Costa Rica	3	0	3	0	114	225	0.507	0	9	0.000	

Date	Time		Score		Set 1	Set 2	Set 3	Set 4	Set 5	Total	Report
18 Mar	14:00	Chile	2–3	Puerto Rico	25–22	26–24	21–25	16–25	13–15	101–111	P2 P3
18 Mar	20:00	Cuba	3–0	Costa Rica	25–14	25–13	25–19			75–46	P2 P3
19 Mar	18:00	Puerto Rico	3–0	Costa Rica	25–9	25–5	25–11			75–25	P2 P3
19 Mar	20:00	Cuba	3–0	Chile	25–20	25–20	25–22			75–62	P2 P3
20 Mar	18:00	Costa Rica	0–3	Chile	15–25	16–25	12–25			43–75	P2 P3
20 Mar	20:00	Cuba	0–3	Puerto Rico	23–25	19–25	18–25			60–75	P2 P3

== Final round ==
=== Championship bracket ===
Quarterfinals
B1	Puerto Rico	2
A4	Peru	3
B2	Cuba	1
A3	Colombia	3

Semifinals
A1	Mexico	3
A4	Peru	1
A2	Dominican Republic	3
A3	Colombia	1

Finals
A1	Mexico	3
A2	Dominican Republic	1
Third place
A4	Peru	0
A3	Colombia	3

=== Quarterfinals ===
Date	Time		Score		Set 1	Set 2	Set 3	Set 4	Set 5	Total	Report
21 Mar	16:00	Colombia	3–1	Cuba	25–16	25–21	27–29	25–13		102–79	P2P3
21 Mar	18:00	Puerto Rico	2–3	Peru	25–22	21–25	15–25	25–19	13–15	99–106	P2P3

=== Classification 5/8 ===
Date	Time		Score		Set 1	Set 2	Set 3	Set 4	Set 5	Total	Report
22 Mar	14:00	Chile	0–3	Cuba	18–25	19–25	13–25			50–75	P2P3
22 Mar	16:00	Costa Rica	0–3	Puerto Rico	10–25	4–25	18–25			32–75	P2P3

=== Semifinals ===
Date	Time		Score		Set 1	Set 2	Set 3	Set 4	Set 5	Total	Report
22 Mar	18:00	Dominican Republic	3–1	Colombia	25–22	25–21	20–25	25–16		95–84	P2P3
22 Mar	20:00	Mexico	3–1	Peru	23–25	25–21	25–22	25–19		98–87	P2P3

=== Seventh place match ===
Date	Time		Score		Set 1	Set 2	Set 3	Set 4	Set 5	Total	Report
23 Mar	14:00	Chile	3–0	Costa Rica	25–20	26–24	25–10			76–54	P2P3

=== Fifth place match ===
Date	Time		Score		Set 1	Set 2	Set 3	Set 4	Set 5	Total	Report
23 Mar	16:00	Cuba	0–3	Puerto Rico	24–26	21–25	23–25			68–76	P2P3

=== Bronze medal match ===
Date	Time		Score		Set 1	Set 2	Set 3	Set 4	Set 5	Total	Report
23 Mar	18:00	Peru	0–3	Colombia	22–25	16–25	21–25			59–75	P2P3

=== Final ===
Date	Time		Score		Set 1	Set 2	Set 3	Set 4	Set 5	Total	Report
23 Mar	20:00	Mexico	3–1	Dominican Republic	25–23	25–23	14–25	25–15		89–86	P2P3

== Final standing ==
Rank	Team
1st place, gold medalist(s)	Mexico
2nd place, silver medalist(s)	Dominican Republic
3rd place, bronze medalist(s)	Colombia
4	Peru
5	Puerto Rico
6	Cuba
7	Chile
8	Costa Rica

== Individual awards ==
- Most valuable player
  - Alejandra Isiordia (MEX)
- Best scorer
  - Alejandra Isiordia (MEX)
- Best spiker
  - Melissa Vargas (CUB)
- Best blocker
  - Melissa Rangel (COL)
- Best server
  - Daly Santana (PUR)
- Best digger
  - Winifer Fernández (DOM)
- Best setter
  - Shiamara Almeida (PER)
- Best receiver
  - Camila Gomez (COL)
- Best libero
  - Winifer Fernández (DOM)
