= Winifer Fernández =

Dominican Republic female volleyball player who went viral in 2016

Personal information
- Full name: Winifer María Fernández Pérez
- Nationality: Dominican
- Born: 6 January 1995 (age 31); Santiago de los Caballeros, Santiago Province, Dominican Republic
- Hometown: Cienfuegos, Santiago de los Caballeros
- Height: 1.69 m (5 ft 7 in)
- Weight: 62 kg (137 lb)
- Spike: 270 cm (106 in)
- Block: 265 cm (104 in)

Volleyball information
- Position: Libero

Career
Years	Teams
2008	Santiago
2010–2011	Cienfuegos
2012	Santiago
2013–2014	Telekom Baku
2014–2015	Rabita Baku
2015-	Mirador
2015–2017	Cienfuegos

National team
2012 -	Dominican Republic
Honours
Women's volleyball
Representing the Dominican Republic
Pan-American Cup
Gold medal – first place	2016 Santo Domingo	Team
Silver medal – second place	2015 Lima/Callao	Team
NORCECA Championship
Silver medal – second place	2015 Michoacan	Team
Junior Pan American Cup
Silver medal – second place	2013 Havana	Team
Bolivarian Games
Gold medal – first place	2017 Santa Marta	Team
- Last updated: September 2017

Winifer María Fernández Pérez (born 6 January 1995) is a Dominican female volleyball player. With her club Mirador she competed at the 2015 FIVB Club World Championship. She became well known after a video and later some photos of her playing and training, and personal photos of her—some of them fake—went viral in July 2016.

In 2010 she won the NORCECA U18 continental championship Best Libero, Digger and Receiver awards, repeating this awards in the 2012 NORCECA U20 Championship, this time with the gold medal and the Most Valuable Player award. She also won the 2012 U23 Pan-American Cup gold medal just before debuting with the senior national team in the 2012 FIVB World Grand Prix. Fernández won the World Grand Prix Group 2, 2016 Pan-American Cup and the 2017 Bolivarian Games gold medals with her senior team. She won the 2008 Dominican Republic League bronze medal and played with the Azerbaijani clubs Telekom Baku and Rabita Baku before playing, with Mirador, in the 2015 Club World Championship.

== Personal and early life ==
Fernández is 169 cm (5 ft 7 in) tall, 62 kilograms (137 lb), was born on 6 January 1995 and hails from Cienfuegos in Santiago, Dominican Republic. She started playing volleyball at the age of ten, under the guidance of coach Miguel Durán, and relocated in 2009 to Santo Domingo to join the junior national team. As of 2013 she was planning to pursue a degree in business administration. She has been described as slick, fast and smart.

== Career ==
=== 2008-2010 ===
Fernández won the 2008 Dominican Republic Volleyball League bronze medal with the Dominican club Santiago. She won the 2009 Santiago province championship and the Best Libero award with her club, Cienfuegos. As a 15-year-old she won the Best Digger, Best Receiver and Best Libero awards in the 2010 NORCECA Youth Championship, finishing with her team in fourth place.

=== 2011-2014 ===
Fernández played in the 2011 Girls' Youth Pan-American Cup, winning the bronze medal and the Best Libero award. She won the Best Digger, Best Receiver and Best Libero awards when she helped the Dominican club Cienfuegos win the 2011 provincial tournament gold medal.

Fernández helped Santiago to the 2012 Northern Region Cup gold medal in her home country; she contributed by topping the spikers with 15 points. Fernández shared with Ana Binet the libero position in the 2012 FIVB World Grand Prix, debuting with the senior national team, for which she received mixed reviews. Her national team reached the 12th position.

At the 2012 Junior NORCECA Championship she led her under-20 national team to win the gold medal, qualifying them for the 2013 Junior World Championship winning also the Most Valuable Player, Best Digger, Best Receiver and Best Libero awards, expressing how happy she was helping the Dominican Republic to win its first category gold medal. She later helped her national team capture the gold medal in the 2012 U23 Pan-American Cup.

She started 2013 by winning the "Most Valuable Player" and gold medal during the Baja California International Cup, held in Mexico. Together with fellow libero player Brenda Castillo, she was awarded 2012 Volleyball Player of the Year by the Santo Domingo Guild of Sports Writers. She later won the silver medal with her junior team in the 2013 Pan-American Cup held in La Havana, Cuba, where they lost 1–3 to Mexico, but winning the Best Digger and Best Libero awards. Together with Brayelin Martínez and Larysmer Martínez, Fernández won the 7th Cabarete Beach Volleyball Tournament, with a RD$30,000 (approximately US$713 in April 2013) bonus. She traveled in June to the FIVB U20 World Championship, ranking eighth with her national junior team.

She took part in the 2013 FIVB World Grand Prix, finishing with her team in the 10th position.

In early 2014 Fernández was selected by the Santiago Province Guild of Sports Writers as Volleyball Player of the Year. She also played with the Azerbaijani professional club Telekom Baku as the second Libero, sharing playing time with compatriot Brenda Castillo. She was selected in June to play the 2014 FIVB World Grand Prix, but the team went 1-8 and ranked last in the Group 1 of the FIVB World Grand Prix defeating only Turkey 3–2.

=== 2015 ===
After being selected by the Santiago Province Guild of Sports Writers as Volleyball Player of the Year, she played with the Dominican club Mirador, Her club lost its two matches 1–3 to the Swiss Voléro Zürich and 0–3 to the Brazilian Rexona Ades Rio and finally ranking, tying for fifth with the Japanese Hisamitsu Springs. Fernández played in the 2015 Montreux Volley Masters, and her national team lost the fifth-place match 1–3 to Germany. She later played the NORCECA Champions Cup, winning the gold medal and the qualification for the 2015 FIVB World Cup. At the Pan-American Cup in Peru, she won the silver medal when her team lost 0–3 to the United States the gold medal match. She then played the 2015 FIVB World Grand Prix, ranking with her national team 12th, after finishing 0–9 in the Group 1. She played in Turkey the U23 World Championship having won the bronze medal when her team lost 2–3 to Brazil but defeated Japan 3–2 to claim the bronze medal. Fernández won the silver medal when her national team lost 1-3 the NORCECA Championship to the United States. She then played with the local club Cienfuegos, winning the XLI version of the Intermunicipal Volleyball tournament in Santiago and winning the Best Libero award.

=== 2016 ===
Fernández was invited to play with her national team which won the gold in the World Grand Prix Group 2. Again during the Pan-American Cup played in home soil. Her team was perfect with 5–0 in the pool play defeating Cuba 3–0 in the semifinals and Puerto Rico 3–2 to win the gold medal and a berth for the 2017 FIVB World Grand Prix.

Selected playing scenes with Fernández as the protagonist of a YouTube video became a viral phenomenon in July 2016 erroneously posting that she was an Olympic player, but her national team did not qualify for the 2016 Summer Olympics after finishing in sixth place in the World Olympic qualification tournament. After the video success, some fake Instagram and Twitter accounts started posting fake photos of her, which were denounced by her National Federation. She commented that she did not like the video with scenes taken from her participation in the 2015 U23 World Championship, and the unexpected fame resulting from that was difficult to handle.

With her U23 national team, she won the U23 Pan-American Cup and the 2017 FIVB U23 World Championship qualification, being named the tournament's best digger.

=== 2017 ===
In September she was ranked by the Salvadoran newspaper El Mundo #7 among the 10 most beautiful and coveted athletes in the world. She replied that it was an honor and a compliment for Dominican women, but that she would like to be remembered for her playing skills. She was invited to participate in the 2017 FIVB U23 World Championship, warming up with the team in Italy against Savino Del Bene Scandicci. Fernández played the 2017 FIVB U23 World Championship in Ljubljana, Slovenia, losing by a score of 2-4 the bronze medal to Bulgaria. She played with Cienfuegos in the XLIII Intermunicipal volleyball tournament in her home province of Santiago, winning the championship and Best Libero award. She won the U23 tournament gold medal in the 2017 Bolivarian Games.

== Clubs ==
- (Dominican Republic) Santiago (2008)
- (Dominican Republic) Cienfuegos (2010–2011)
- (Dominican Republic) Santiago (2012)
- (Azerbaijan) Telekom Baku (2013–2014)
- (Azerbaijan) Rabita Baku (2014–2015)
- (Dominican Republic) Mirador (2015)
- (Dominican Republic) Cienfuegos (2015–2017)

== Awards ==
=== Individuals ===
- 2010 NORCECA Youth Championship "Best Digger"
- 2010 NORCECA Youth Championship "Best Receiver"
- 2010 NORCECA Youth Championship "Best Libero"
- 2011 Girls' Youth Pan-American Cup "Best Libero"
- 2012 NORCECA Junior Championship "Most Valuable Player"
- 2012 NORCECA Junior Championship "Best Digger"
- 2012 NORCECA Junior Championship "Best Receiver"
- 2012 NORCECA Junior Championship "Best Libero"
- 2013 Junior Pan-American Cup "Best Digger"
- 2013 Junior Pan-American Cup "Best Libero"
- 2013 Baja California International Cup "Most Valuable Player"
- 2016 U23 Pan-American Cup "Best Digger"

=== Clubs ===
- 2008 Dominican Republic Volleyball League – Bronze medal, with Santiago
