= 2016 Women's Junior NORCECA Volleyball Championship =

Tournament details
- Host country: United States
- Dates: 26–31 July
- Teams: 9
- Venue: Don Taft University Center (in 1 host city)

Final positions
- Champions: Dominican Republic (2nd title)
- Runners-up: United States
- Third place: Cuba

Tournament awards
- MVP: Natalia Martínez (DOM)

The 2016 Women's Junior NORCECA Volleyball Championship was the tenth edition of the bi-annual tournament. It was held in Fort Lauderdale, Florida from 26 July to 31 July, and featured eight teams. The Dominican Republic won the tournament and qualified to the 2017 FIVB Women's Junior World Championship. Dominican Natalia Martínez was awarded Most Valuable Player.

== Teams ==
2015 NORCECA Ranking in parentheses.

Group A	Group B
Dominican Republic (1)	United States (Host - 4)
Cuba (3)	Mexico (2)
Costa Rica (5)	Puerto Rico (6)
Haiti (12)	Saint Martin (11)

== Pool standing procedure ==
Match won 3–0: 5 points for the winner, 0 point for the loser
Match won 3–1: 4 points for the winner, 1 points for the loser
Match won 3–2: 3 points for the winner, 2 points for the loser
In case of equality in the number of matches won and lost, the tie will be broken according to the following criteria in order of importance:

1. Match points
2. Point Ratio
3. Set Ratio
4. Head-to-head result

== Preliminary round ==
- All times are in Eastern Daylight Time–(UTC-4:00)

=== Group A ===
Pos	Team	Pld	W	L	Pts	SPW	SPL	SPR	SW	SL	SR	Qualification
1	Dominican Republic	3	3	0	15	226	110	2.055	9	0	MAX	Semifinals
2	Cuba	3	2	1	10	213	135	1.578	6	3	2.000	Quarterfinals
3	Costa Rica	3	1	2	5	119	213	0.559	3	6	0.500	Quarterfinals
4	Haiti	3	0	3	0	125	225	0.556	0	9	0.000	

Date	Time		Score		Set 1	Set 2	Set 3	Set 4	Set 5	Total	Report
26 Jul	13:00	Cuba	3–0	Haiti	25–8	25–9	25–14			75–31	P2 P3
26 Jul	15:00	Dominican Republic	3–0	Costa Rica	25–7	25–6	25–3			75–16	P2 P3
27 Jul	15:00	Haiti	0–3	Dominican Republic	15–25	6–25	10–25			31–75	P2 P3
27 Jul	17:00	Costa Rica	0–3	Cuba	9–25	9–25	10–25			28–75	P2 P3
28 Jul	13:00	Haiti	0–3	Costa Rica	23–25	23–25	17–25			63–75	P2 P3
28 Jul	17:00	Cuba	0–3	Dominican Republic	21–25	18–25	24–26			63–76	P2 P3

=== Group B ===
Pos	Team	Pld	W	L	Pts	SPW	SPL	SPR	SW	SL	SR	Qualification
1	United States	3	3	0	14	256	134	1.910	9	1	9.000	Semifinals
2	Puerto Rico	3	2	1	9	257	214	1.201	7	5	1.400	Quarterfinals
3	Mexico	3	1	2	7	223	208	1.072	5	6	0.833	Quarterfinals
4	Saint Martin	3	0	3	0	45	225	0.200	0	9	0.000	

Date	Time		Score		Set 1	Set 2	Set 3	Set 4	Set 5	Total	Report
26 Jul	17:00	Mexico	2–3	Puerto Rico	23–25	25–23	20–25	25–19	7–15	100–107	P2 P3
26 Jul	19:00	United States	3–0	Saint Martin	25–2	25–4	25–5			75–11	P2 P3
27 Jul	13:00	Saint Martin	0–3	Mexico	7–25	3–25	8–25			18–75	P2 P3
27 Jul	19:00	United States	3–1	Puerto Rico	25–15	23–25	25–15	25–20		98–75	P2 P3
28 Jul	15:00	Puerto Rico	3–0	Saint Martin	25–5	25–4	25–7			75–16	P2 P3
28 Jul	19:00	United States	3–0	Mexico	33–31	25–12	25–5			83–48	P2 P3

== Final round ==
=== Bracket ===
Quarterfinals
B2	Puerto Rico	3
A3	Costa Rica	0
A2	Cuba	3
B3	Mexico	0

Semifinals
A1	Dominican Republic	3
B2	Puerto Rico	0
B1	United States	3
A2	Cuba	0

Finals
A1	Dominican Republic	3
B1	United States	1
Third place
B2	Puerto Rico	1
A2	Cuba	3

Consolation semifinals
B3	Mexico	3
A4	Haiti	0
A3	Costa Rica	3
B4	Saint Martin	0

7th place
A4	Haiti	3
B4	Saint Martin	0
5th place
B3	Mexico	3
A3	Costa Rica	0

=== Quarterfinals ===
Date	Time		Score		Set 1	Set 2	Set 3	Set 4	Set 5	Total	Report
29 July	17:00	Cuba	3–0	Mexico	25–21	25–19	25–20			75–60	P2 P3
29 July	19:00	Puerto Rico	3–0	Costa Rica	25–18	25–15	25–10			75–43	P2 P3

=== 5th-8th Classification ===
Date	Time		Score		Set 1	Set 2	Set 3	Set 4	Set 5	Total	Report
30 July	13:00	Haiti	0–3	Mexico	11–25	14–25	17–25			42–75	P2 P3
30 July	15:00	Saint Martin	0–3	Costa Rica	5–25	14–25	8–25			27–75	P2 P3

=== Semifinals ===
Date	Time		Score		Set 1	Set 2	Set 3	Set 4	Set 5	Total	Report
30 July	17:00	Dominican Republic	3–0	Puerto Rico	25–17	25–19	25–19			75–55	P2 P3
30 July	19:00	United States	3–0	Cuba	25–13	25–14	25–22			75–49	P2 P3

=== 7th place ===
Date	Time		Score		Set 1	Set 2	Set 3	Set 4	Set 5	Total	Report
31 July	13:00	Haiti	3–0	Saint Martin	25–15	25–17	25–11			75–43	P2 P3

=== 5th place ===
Date	Time		Score		Set 1	Set 2	Set 3	Set 4	Set 5	Total	Report
31 July	15:00	Mexico	3–0	Costa Rica	25–20	25–14	25–13			75–47	P2 P3

=== 3rd place ===
Date	Time		Score		Set 1	Set 2	Set 3	Set 4	Set 5	Total	Report
31 July	17:00	Puerto Rico	1–3	Cuba	25–18	20–25	20–25	16–25		81–93	P2 P3

=== Final ===
Date	Time		Score		Set 1	Set 2	Set 3	Set 4	Set 5	Total	Report
31 July	19:00	Dominican Republic	3–1	United States	25–22	25–14	23–25	25–17		98–78	P2 P3

== Final standing ==
Qualified to 2017 U-20 World Championship

Rank	Team
1st place, gold medalist(s)	Dominican Republic
2nd place, silver medalist(s)	United States
3rd place, bronze medalist(s)	Cuba
4	Puerto Rico
5	Mexico
6	Costa Rica
7	Haiti
8	Saint Martin

== Individual awards ==
- Most valuable player
  - Natalia Martinez (DOM)
- Best setter
  - Andrea Fuentes (PUR)
- Best Opposite
  - Massiel Matos (DOM)
- Best Outside Hitters
  - Alexis Sun (USA)
  - Diaris Pérez (CUB)
- Best Middle Blockers
  - Geraldine González (DOM)
  - Brionne Butler (USA)
- Best libero
  - Jeshimarie Suarez (PUR)
- Best digger
  - Jeshimarie Suarez (PUR)
- Best receiver
  - Diaris Pérez (CUB)
- Best server
  - Massiel Matos (DOM)
- Best scorer
  - Dariana Hollingsworth (PUR)
