= 2012 Women's Junior NORCECA Volleyball Championship =

Tournament details
- Host country: Nicaragua
- Dates: August 21–26, 2012
- Teams: 9
- Venue: 1 (in Managua host cities)

Final positions
- Champions: Dominican Republic (1st title)
- Runners-up: Mexico
- Third place: United States

Tournament awards
- MVP: Winifer Fernández (DOM)

The 2012 Girls' Youth NORCECA Volleyball Championship was the eighth edition of the bi-annual women's volleyball tournament, played by nine countries from August 21–26, 2012 in Managua, Nicaragua. The event served as qualifier to the 2013 Women's Junior World Championship

== Competing nations ==
Group A	Group B	Group C
Antigua and Barbuda; Costa Rica; Nicaragua	Dominican Republic; Guatemala; Mexico	Cuba; Trinidad and Tobago; United States

== Pool standing procedure ==
Match won 3–0: 5 points for the winner, 0 point for the loser
Match won 3–1: 4 points for the winner, 1 points for the loser
Match won 3–2: 3 points for the winner, 2 points for the loser
In case of tie, the teams were classified according to the following criteria:
points ratio and sets ratio

== First round ==
All times are CST, Nicaragua Standard Time (UTC -06)

=== Group A ===
Pos	Team	Pld	W	L	Pts	SPW	SPL	SPR	SW	SL	SR	Qualification
1	Costa Rica	2	2	0	10	150	72	2.083	6	0	MAX	Semifinals
2	Nicaragua	2	1	1	5	122	112	1.089	3	3	1.000	Quarterfinals
3	Antigua and Barbuda	2	0	2	0	62	150	0.413	0	6	0.000	7th to 9th qualification

Date	Time		Score		Set 1	Set 2	Set 3	Set 4	Set 5	Total	Report
21 Aug	16:00	Costa Rica	3–0	Antigua and Barbuda	25–9	25–9	25–9			75–27	P2 P3
22 Aug	20:00	Nicaragua	3–0	Antigua and Barbuda	25–12	25–13	25–12			75–37	P2 P3
23 Aug	20:00	Nicaragua	0–3	Costa Rica	10–25	23–25	14–25			47–75	P2 P3

=== Group B ===
Pos	Team	Pld	W	L	Pts	SPW	SPL	SPR	SW	SL	SR	Qualification
1	Dominican Republic	2	2	0	9	173	109	1.587	6	1	6.000	Semifinals
2	Mexico	2	1	1	6	161	123	1.309	4	3	1.333	Quarterfinals
3	Guatemala	2	0	2	0	48	150	0.320	0	6	0.000	7th to 9th qualification

Date	Time		Score		Set 1	Set 2	Set 3	Set 4	Set 5	Total	Report
21 Aug	20:00	Mexico	3–0	Guatemala	25–11	25–11	25–3			75–25	P2 P3
22 Aug	16:00	Dominican Republic	3–0	Guatemala	25–7	25–3	25–13			75–23	P2 P3
23 Aug	16:00	Dominican Republic	3–1	Mexico	25–20	21–25	25–16	27–25		98–86	P2 P3

=== Group C ===
Pos	Team	Pld	W	L	Pts	SPW	SPL	SPR	SW	SL	SR	Qualification
1	United States	2	2	0	9	169	115	1.470	6	1	6.000	Quarterfinals
2	Cuba	2	1	1	6	162	129	1.256	4	3	1.333	Quarterfinals
3	Trinidad and Tobago	2	0	2	0	63	150	0.420	0	6	0.000	7th to 9th qualification

Date	Time		Score		Set 1	Set 2	Set 3	Set 4	Set 5	Total	Report
21 Aug	16:00	United States	3–0	Trinidad and Tobago	25–10	25–10	25–8			75–28	P2 P3
22 Aug	16:00	Cuba	3–0	Trinidad and Tobago	25–13	25–8	25–14			75–35	P2 P3
23 Aug	16:00	United States	3–1	Cuba	19–25	25–23	25–23	25–16		94–87	P2 P3

== Final round ==
=== Championship bracket ===
Quarterfinals
C1	United States	3
A2	Nicaragua	0
B2	Mexico	3
C2	Cuba	2

Semifinals
B1	Dominican Republic	3
C1	United States	2
A1	Costa Rica	0
B2	Mexico	3

Finals
B1	Dominican Republic	3
B2	Mexico	1
Third place
C1	United States	3
A1	Costa Rica	0

=== Classification 7th to 9th places ===
Date	Time		Score		Set 1	Set 2	Set 3	Set 4	Set 5	Total	Report
24 Aug	16:00	Antigua and Barbuda	0–3	Guatemala	8–25	8–25	13–25			29–75	P2 P3

=== Quarterfinals ===
Date	Time		Score		Set 1	Set 2	Set 3	Set 4	Set 5	Total	Report
24 Aug	18:00	Mexico	3–2	Cuba	25–15	25–19	21–25	14–25	15–12	100–96	P2 P3
24 Aug	20:00	United States	3–0	Nicaragua	25–10	25–7	25–7			75–24	P2 P3

=== 7th place match ===
Date	Time		Score		Set 1	Set 2	Set 3	Set 4	Set 5	Total	Report
25 Aug	16:00	Trinidad and Tobago	0–3	Guatemala	7–25	16–25	7–25			30–75	P2 P3

=== Semifinals ===
Date	Time		Score		Set 1	Set 2	Set 3	Set 4	Set 5	Total	Report
25 Aug	18:00	Dominican Republic	3–2	United States	22–25	13–25	25–21	25–22	15–10	100–103	P2 P3
25 Aug	20:00	Costa Rica	0–3	Mexico	16–25	19–25	19–25			54–75	P2 P3

=== 5th place match ===
Date	Time		Score		Set 1	Set 2	Set 3	Set 4	Set 5	Total	Report
26 Aug	15:00	Cuba	3–0	Nicaragua	25–4	25–8	25–10			75–22	P2 P3

=== 3rd place match ===
Date	Time		Score		Set 1	Set 2	Set 3	Set 4	Set 5	Total	Report
26 Aug	17:00	United States	3–0	Costa Rica	25–18	25–14	25–22			75–54	P2 P3

=== Final ===
Date	Time		Score		Set 1	Set 2	Set 3	Set 4	Set 5	Total	Report
26 Aug	19:00	Dominican Republic	3–1	Mexico	25–19	25–21	24–26	25–11		99–77	P2 P3

== Final standing ==
Rank	Team
1st place, gold medalist(s)	Dominican Republic
2nd place, silver medalist(s)	Mexico
3rd place, bronze medalist(s)	United States
4	Costa Rica
5	Cuba
6	Nicaragua
7	Guatemala
8	Trinidad and Tobago
9	Antigua and Barbuda

Qualified for the 2013 World Junior Championship

2012 Women's Junior NORCECA Volleyball Championship

Dominican Republic
1st title

== Individual awards ==
- Most valuable player
  - Winifer Fernández (DOM)
- Best scorer
  - Brayelin Martínez (DOM)
- Best spiker
  - Sulian Matienzo (CUB)
- Best blocker
  - Angélica Hinojosa (DOM)
- Best server
  - María Alvarez (GUA)
- Best digger
  - Winifer Fernández (DOM)
- Best setter
  - Marilyn Pages (CUB)
- Best receiver
  - Winifer Fernández (DOM)
- Best libero
  - Winifer Fernández (DOM)
