= 2015 Women's Junior Pan-American Volleyball Cup squads =

This article show all participating team squads at the 2015 Women's Junior Pan-American Volleyball Cup, played by sixteen countries with the final round held in Dominican Republic

== Teams ==
=== Argentina ===
The following is the Argentinean roster in the 2015 Women's Junior Pan-American Volleyball Cup.

Head Coach: (Argentina) Mauro Silvestre

No.	Name	Date of birth	Height	Weight	Spike	Block	2015 club
1	Valentina Gonzalez	23 February 1998	1.63 m (5 ft 4 in)	56 kg (123 lb)	271 cm (107 in)	260 cm (100 in)	(Argentina) 9 De Julio - Freyre
2	Candelaria Herrera	28 January 1999	1.82 m (6 ft 0 in)	71 kg (157 lb)	290 cm (110 in)	275 cm (108 in)	(Argentina) Universidad De San Juan
5	Fiamma Biain	30 January 1998	1.71 m (5 ft 7 in)	67 kg (148 lb)	279 cm (110 in)	266 cm (105 in)	(Argentina) Union San Guillermo
7	Azul Benítez (C)	5 February 1998	1.67 m (5 ft 6 in)	57 kg (126 lb)	272 cm (107 in)	263 cm (104 in)	(Argentina) Mar Chiquita
9	Anahi Tosi	10 July 1998	1.81 m (5 ft 11 in)	60 kg (130 lb)	290 cm (110 in)	272 cm (107 in)	(Argentina) 9 De Julio - Freyre
10	Candela Nota	1 March 1999	1.82 m (6 ft 0 in)	60 kg (130 lb)	280 cm (110 in)	271 cm (107 in)	(Argentina) Union San Guillermo
11	Maria Corbalan	7 November 1998	1.75 m (5 ft 9 in)	60 kg (130 lb)	283 cm (111 in)	275 cm (108 in)	(Argentina) Fundarte
13	Sabrina Germanier	7 June 1999	1.75 m (5 ft 9 in)	65 kg (143 lb)	276 cm (109 in)	269 cm (106 in)	(Argentina) Social Y Dep. San Jose
14	Agostina Beltramino	25 April 1999	1.80 m (5 ft 11 in)	65 kg (143 lb)	283 cm (111 in)	283 cm (111 in)	(Argentina) Provincial - Rosario
16	Victoria Michel Tosi	1 July 1999	1.82 m (6 ft 0 in)	69 kg (152 lb)	283 cm (111 in)	273 cm (107 in)	(Argentina) Echague-Parana
17	Luciana Porcel	20 January 1999	1.69 m (5 ft 7 in)	57 kg (126 lb)	278 cm (109 in)	266 cm (105 in)	(Argentina) Universidad De San Juan
18	Ariana Macies	12 March 1998	1.80 m (5 ft 11 in)	56 kg (123 lb)	277 cm (109 in)	263 cm (104 in)	(Argentina) Monte Buey
