= Yang Hanyu =

Chinese volleyball player (born 1999)

Personal information
- Full name: 杨涵玉
- Nationality: Chinese
- Born: 12 October 1999 (age 27) Shandong
- Home town: Shandong
- Height: 1.98 m (6 ft 6 in)
- Weight: 72 kg (159 lb)
- Spike: 317 cm (125 in)
- Block: 311 cm (122 in)

Volleyball information
- Position: Middle Blocker
- Current club: Shandong women's volleyball team
- Number: 10 (Club) 4 (NT)

Career
- Years: Team
- 2016 - present 2018 2018: Shandong; Beijing (loaned); Zhejiang (loaned)

National team
- Years: Team
- 2016 - 2017 2018 - present: China U20; China
Honours
Women's volleyball
Representing China
World Championship
Bronze medal – third place	2018 Japan	Team
World Cup
Gold medal – first place	2019 Japan	Team
FIVB Nations League
Silver medal – second place	2023 Arlington	Team
Bronze medal – third place	2019 Nanjing	Team
U20 World Championship
Gold medal – first place	2017 Mexico
- Updated on October 29, 2019

Yang Hanyu (Chinese: 杨涵玉; born October 12, 1999, in Shandong) is a Chinese volleyball player. Her former full name is Yang Liu (Chinese: 杨柳). She participated at the 2018 Montreux Volley Masters, 2018 FIVB Volleyball Women's Nations League, and 2018 FIVB Volleyball Women's World Championship.

She was the best blocker of 2018 FIVB Volleyball Women's Club World Championship in fact as the member of Zhejiang Xitang.

== Awards ==
=== National team ===
==== Junior team ====
- 2016 Asian Junior Women's Volleyball Championship - Gold Medal
- 2017 FIVB Volleyball Women's U20 World Championship - Gold Medal

==== Senior team ====
- 2018 World Championship - Bronze Medal

=== Clubs ===
- 2017 National Games of China - Bronze medal, with Shandong Junior

=== Individuals ===
- 2016 Asian Junior Women's Volleyball Championship "Best Middle Blocker"
- 2017 FIVB Volleyball Women's U20 World Championship "Best Middle Blocker"
- 2017 FIVB Volleyball Women's U20 World Championship "Most Valuable Player"
- 2023 Asian Championship – "Best Middle Blocker"
