= Anna Kotikova =

Russian volleyball player

Anna Kotikova Анна Котикова
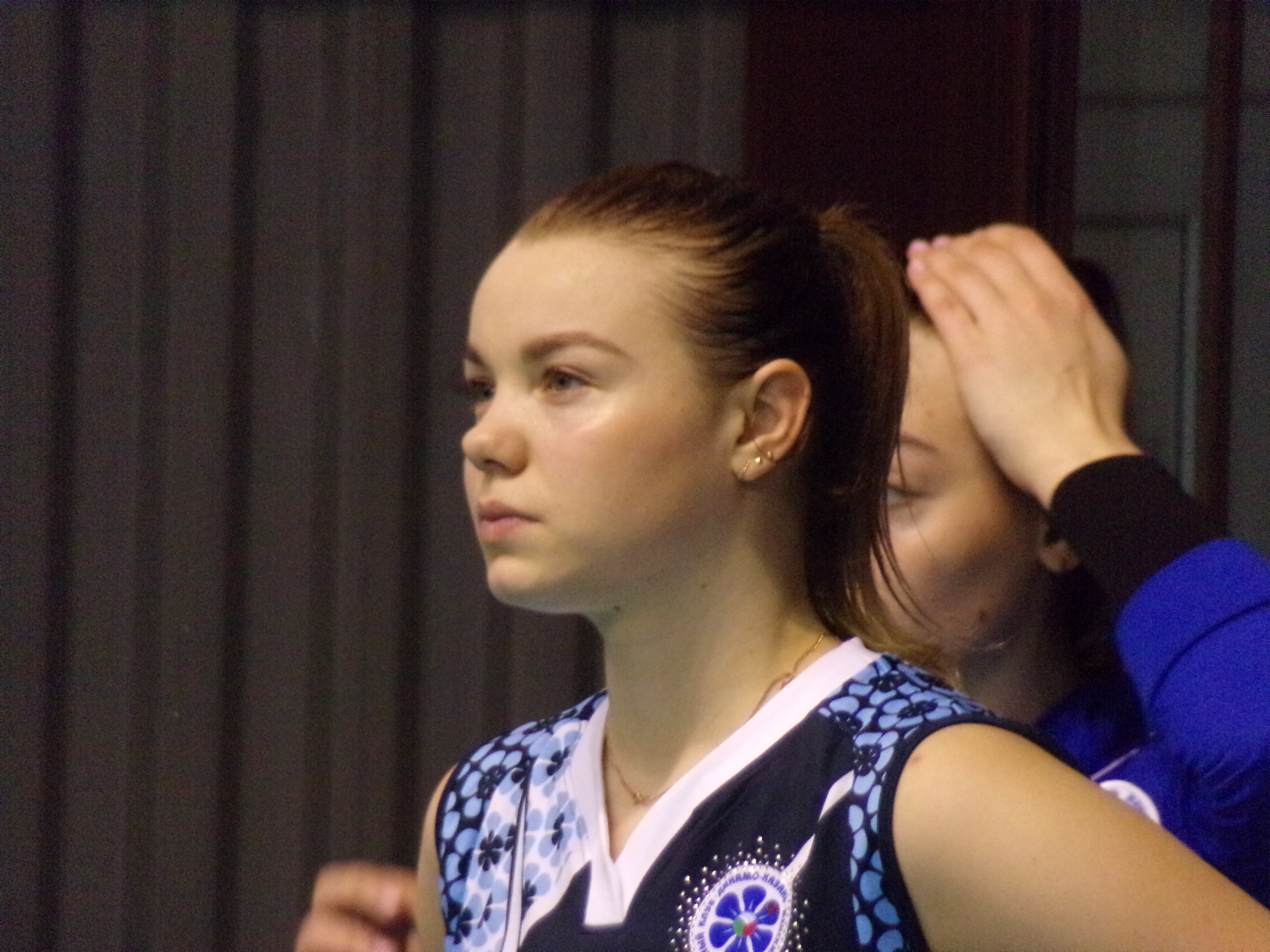
- Kotikova in 2019

Personal information
- Full name: Anna Mikhailovna Kotikova
- Nationality: Russia
- Born: 13 October 1999 (age 27); Shuya, Russia
- Height: 1.87 m (6 ft 2 in)
- Weight: 71 kg (157 lb)
- Spike: 306 cm (120 in)
- Block: 300 cm (118 in)

Volleyball information
- Position: Outside/Opposite hitter
- Current club: Dinamo Kazan
- Number: 7

Career
| Years | Teams |
|---|---|
| 2014– | Dinamo Kazan |

National team
| 2018– | Russia |
Honours
Women's volleyball
Representing Russia
Universiade
| Gold medal – first place | 2017 Taipei | Team |

Anna Mikhailovna Kotikova (Russian: Анна Михайловна Котикова; born 13 October 1999) is a Russian volleyball player, who plays as an outside hitter for the Russian club Dinamo Kazan and the Russian women's national volleyball team. She has won gold medal at the 2016 Women's U19 Volleyball European Championship and silver medal at the 2017 FIVB Volleyball Women's U20 World Championship with the youth teams of Russia while being selected as the "most valuable player" at the former. In both tournaments, she played in the opposite position and was named the "best opposite spiker" of the tournament. She has won the Russian Cup with her club in 2017.

== Awards ==
=== Individuals ===
- 2016 Women's U19 Volleyball European Championship "Most valuable player"
- 2016 Women's U19 Volleyball European Championship "Best opposite spiker"
- 2017 FIVB Volleyball Women's U20 World Championship "Best opposite spiker"

=== Clubs ===
- 2016–17 Russian Women's Volleyball Super League - Runner-Up, with Dinamo Kazan
- 2017 Russian Cup - Champion, with Dinamo Kazan
- 2017–18 Russian Women's Volleyball Super League - Runner-Up, with Dinamo Kazan
- 2018 Russian Cup - Bronze Medal, with Dinamo Kazan
- 2019 Russian Cup - Champion, with Dinamo Kazan
- 2019–20 Russian Super League - Champion, with Dinamo Kazan

=== National team ===
==== Junior team ====
- 2016 Women's U19 Volleyball European Championship - Gold Medal
- 2017 FIVB Volleyball Women's U20 World Championship - Silver Medal
- 2017 Summer Universiade - Gold Medal
