= 2017 FIVB Volleyball Women's U20 World Championship =

2017 Women's U20 World Championship
Tournament details
- Host country: Mexico
- Dates: 14–23 July
- Teams: 16
- Venues: 2 (in 2 host cities)

Final positions
- Champions: China (3rd title)

Tournament awards
- MVP: (China) Yang Hanyu

The 2017 FIVB Volleyball Women's U20 World Championship was the nineteenth edition of the international volleyball tournament and the world championship for women's national teams under the age of 20, organized by the sport's world governing body, FIVB. The tournament was hosted by Mexico in the cities of Boca del Río and Córdoba from 14 to 23 July 2017.

China defeated Russia in the final to capture their third title in the competition. Japan won the bronze medal after defeating Turkey in the third place match. Yang Hanyu from China was elected the Most Valuable Player.

== Qualification ==
The FIVB Sports Events Council revealed a proposal to streamline the number of teams participating in the Age Group World Championships.

Means of Qualification		Date	Venues	Vacancies	Qualifiers
Host Nation		2 February 2016	(Switzerland) Lausanne	1	Mexico
2016 Asian Championship		23–31 July 2016	(Thailand) Nakhon Ratchasima	2	China
2016 Asian Championship		23–31 July 2016	(Thailand) Nakhon Ratchasima	2	Japan
2016 NORCECA Championship		26–31 July 2016	(United States) Fort Lauderdale	1	Dominican Republic
2016 South American Championship		26–30 October 2016	(Brazil) Uberaba	1	Brazil
2017 African Championship		28–29 January 2017	(Egypt) Cairo	1	Egypt
2017 Pan-American Cup	For CSV	6–14 May 2017	(Costa Rica) San José	1	Argentina
2017 Pan-American Cup	For NORCECA	6–14 May 2017	(Costa Rica) San José	1	United States
2017 European Qualifiers		5 January – 21 May 2017	Various	2	Poland
2017 European Qualifiers		5 January – 21 May 2017	Various	2	Russia
World Ranking		As per 1 January 2017	(Switzerland) Lausanne	6	Italy
World Ranking		As per 1 January 2017	(Switzerland) Lausanne	6	Serbia
World Ranking		As per 1 January 2017	(Switzerland) Lausanne	6	Peru
World Ranking		As per 1 January 2017	(Switzerland) Lausanne	6	Turkey
World Ranking		As per 1 January 2017	(Switzerland) Lausanne	6	Cuba
World Ranking		As per 1 January 2017	(Switzerland) Lausanne	6	Bulgaria
Total				16	

== Pools composition ==
The drawing of lots was held in Boca del Rio, Mexico on 8 June 2017. Mexico as a host country team were seeded in the top position of pool A, And the top seven teams from World ranking as per January 2017 were seed in serpentine system in first two rows. the eight remaining teams were drawn in next two rows. Numbers in brackets denote the World ranking.

Pool A	Pool B	Pool C	Pool D
Mexico (18)	Dominican Rep. (1)	Brazil (2)	Japan (3)
Russia (7)	Peru (6)	Serbia (5)	Italy (4)
Egypt (10)	China (8)	Cuba (11)	Turkey (9)
Bulgaria (11)	Poland (42)	United States (15)	Argentina (15)

== Pool standing procedure ==
1. Number of matches won
2. Match points
3. Sets ratio
4. Points ratio
5. If the tie continues as per the point ratio between two teams, the priority will be given to the team which won the last match between them. When the tie in points ratio is between three or more teams, a new classification of these teams in the terms of points 1, 2 and 3 will be made taking into consideration only the matches in which they were opposed to each other.

Match won 3–0 or 3–1: 3 match points for the winner, 0 match points for the loser
Match won 3–2: 2 match points for the winner, 1 match point for the loser

== First round ==
- All times are Central Daylight Time Zone (UTC−05:00).

=== Pool A ===
Pos	Team	Pld	W	L	Pts	SW	SL	SR	SPW	SPL	SPR	Qualification
1	Russia	3	3	0	9	9	2	4.500	272	189	1.439	Second round Pool E
2	Bulgaria	3	2	1	5	7	5	1.400	252	257	0.981	Second round Pool F
3	Mexico	3	1	2	3	6	8	0.750	278	316	0.880	Second round Pool G
4	Egypt	3	0	3	1	2	9	0.222	220	260	0.846	Second round Pool H

Date	Time		Score		Set 1	Set 2	Set 3	Set 4	Set 5	Total	Report
14 Jul	18:00	Russia	3–1	Bulgaria	25–15	25–13	24–26	25–13		99–67	P2 P3
14 Jul	21:00	Mexico	3–2	Egypt	16–25	29–31	25–20	25–19	15–13	110–108	P2 P3
15 Jul	15:00	Egypt	0–3	Bulgaria	17–25	21–25	23–25			61–75	P2 P3
15 Jul	20:00	Russia	3–1	Mexico	25–15	23–25	25–17	25–14		98–71	P2 P3
16 Jul	15:00	Russia	3–0	Egypt	25–18	25–16	25–17			75–51	P2 P3
16 Jul	20:00	Mexico	2–3	Bulgaria	25–27	26–24	12–25	25–19	9–15	97–110	P2 P3

=== Pool B ===
Pos	Team	Pld	W	L	Pts	SW	SL	SR	SPW	SPL	SPR	Qualification
1	China	3	2	1	7	8	3	2.667	252	217	1.161	Second round Pool F
2	Poland	3	2	1	6	8	6	1.333	290	284	1.021	Second round Pool E
3	Dominican Republic	3	2	1	5	6	5	1.200	237	226	1.049	Second round Pool H
4	Peru	3	0	3	0	1	9	0.111	188	240	0.783	Second round Pool G

Date	Time		Score		Set 1	Set 2	Set 3	Set 4	Set 5	Total	Report
14 Jul	13:00	Peru	0–3	China	21–25	24–26	19–25			64–76	P2 P3
14 Jul	15:00	Dominican Republic	3–2	Poland	20–25	25–23	20–25	25–17	16–14	106–104	P2 P3
15 Jul	13:00	Dominican Republic	3–0	Peru	25–20	25–8	25–19			75–47	P2 P3
15 Jul	18:00	China	2–3	Poland	25–16	24–26	25–15	15–25	12–15	101–97	P2 P3
16 Jul	13:00	Peru	1–3	Poland	18–25	22–25	25–14	12–25		77–89	P2 P3
16 Jul	18:00	Dominican Republic	0–3	China	19–25	20–25	17–25			56–75	P2 P3

=== Pool C ===
Pos	Team	Pld	W	L	Pts	SW	SL	SR	SPW	SPL	SPR	Qualification
1	Brazil	3	3	0	8	9	4	2.250	307	243	1.263	Second round Pool E
2	United States	3	2	1	5	7	5	1.400	251	282	0.890	Second round Pool F
3	Serbia	3	1	2	3	6	8	0.750	300	291	1.031	Second round Pool G
4	Cuba	3	0	3	2	4	9	0.444	256	298	0.859	Second round Pool H

Date	Time		Score		Set 1	Set 2	Set 3	Set 4	Set 5	Total	Report
14 Jul	18:00	Serbia	3–2	Cuba	25–13	25–17	25–27	17–25	15–11	107–93	P2 P3
14 Jul	21:00	Brazil	3–1	United States	25–10	25–12	24–26	25–22		99–70	P2 P3
15 Jul	18:00	Brazil	3–1	Serbia	25–13	25–21	23–25	25–22		98–81	P2 P3
15 Jul	20:00	Cuba	0–3	United States	29–31	19–25	23–25			71–81	P2 P3
16 Jul	18:00	Serbia	2–3	United States	25–22	25–10	24–26	23–25	15–17	112–100	P2 P3
16 Jul	20:00	Brazil	3–2	Cuba	23–25	22–25	25–9	25–20	15–13	110–92	P2 P3

=== Pool D ===
Pos	Team	Pld	W	L	Pts	SW	SL	SR	SPW	SPL	SPR	Qualification
1	Japan	3	3	0	8	9	2	4.500	258	208	1.240	Second round Pool F
2	Turkey	3	2	1	5	8	7	1.143	322	314	1.025	Second round Pool E
3	Italy	3	1	2	4	5	6	0.833	233	247	0.943	Second round Pool H
4	Argentina	3	0	3	1	2	9	0.222	220	264	0.833	Second round Pool G

Date	Time		Score		Set 1	Set 2	Set 3	Set 4	Set 5	Total	Report
14 Jul	13:00	Japan	3–0	Argentina	25–11	25–13	25–22			75–46	P2 P3
14 Jul	15:00	Italy	2–3	Turkey	25–20	21–25	25–20	16–25	12–15	99–105	P2 P3
15 Jul	13:00	Turkey	3–2	Argentina	23–25	28–26	25–19	20–25	15–13	111–108	P2 P3
15 Jul	15:00	Japan	3–0	Italy	25–17	25–15	26–24			76–56	P2 P3
16 Jul	13:00	Japan	3–2	Turkey	22–25	20–25	25–21	25–23	15–12	107–106	P2 P3
16 Jul	15:00	Italy	3–0	Argentina	28–26	25–21	25–19			78–66	P2 P3

== Second round ==
- All times are Central Daylight Time Zone (UTC−05:00).

=== Pool E ===
Pos	Team	Pld	W	L	Pts	SW	SL	SR	SPW	SPL	SPR	Qualification
1	Russia	3	3	0	9	9	1	9.000	238	185	1.286	Semifinals
2	Turkey	3	2	1	6	7	5	1.400	275	256	1.074	Semifinals
3	Poland	3	1	2	3	4	6	0.667	211	219	0.963	5th–8th semifinals
4	Brazil	3	0	3	0	1	9	0.111	184	248	0.742	5th–8th semifinals

Date	Time		Score		Set 1	Set 2	Set 3	Set 4	Set 5	Total	Report
18 Jul	18:00	Russia	3–1	Turkey	25–21	25–22	13–25	25–20		88–88	P2 P3
18 Jul	20:00	Poland	3–0	Brazil	25–14	25–18	25–23			75–55	P2 P3
19 Jul	18:00	Russia	3–0	Poland	25–20	25–15	25–14			75–49	P2 P3
19 Jul	20:00	Brazil	1–3	Turkey	19–25	25–23	19–25	18–25		81–98	P2 P3
20 Jul	18:00	Poland	1–3	Turkey	25–13	20–25	24–26	18–25		87–89	P2 P3
20 Jul	20:00	Russia	3–0	Brazil	25–19	25–18	25–11			75–48	P2 P3

=== Pool F ===
Pos	Team	Pld	W	L	Pts	SW	SL	SR	SPW	SPL	SPR	Qualification
1	China	3	3	0	8	9	3	3.000	281	258	1.089	Semifinals
2	Japan	3	2	1	6	7	3	2.333	245	206	1.189	Semifinals
3	Bulgaria	3	1	2	2	3	8	0.375	203	259	0.784	5th–8th semifinals
4	United States	3	0	3	2	4	9	0.444	273	279	0.978	5th–8th semifinals

Date	Time		Score		Set 1	Set 2	Set 3	Set 4	Set 5	Total	Report
18 Jul	13:00	China	3–2	United States	23–25	30–28	25–16	10–25	15–13	103–107	P2 P3
18 Jul	15:00	Bulgaria	0–3	Japan	16–25	12–25	18–25			46–75	P2 P3
19 Jul	13:00	Japan	3–0	United States	25–18	25–22	25–17			75–57	P2 P3
19 Jul	15:00	China	3–0	Bulgaria	25–18	25–17	25–21			75–56	P2 P3
20 Jul	13:00	Bulgaria	3–2	United States	16–25	26–24	19–25	25–23	15–12	101–109	P2 P3
20 Jul	15:00	China	3–1	Japan	25–19	30–28	23–25	25–23		103–95	P2 P3

=== Pool G ===
Pos	Team	Pld	W	L	Pts	SW	SL	SR	SPW	SPL	SPR	Qualification
1	Serbia	3	3	0	8	9	2	4.500	254	214	1.187	9th–12th semifinals
2	Argentina	3	2	1	7	8	4	2.000	259	224	1.156	9th–12th semifinals
3	Peru	3	1	2	3	4	7	0.571	212	227	0.934	13th–16th semifinals
4	Mexico	3	0	3	0	1	9	0.111	187	247	0.757	13th–16th semifinals

Date	Time		Score		Set 1	Set 2	Set 3	Set 4	Set 5	Total	Report
18 Jul	18:00	Peru	0–3	Serbia	13–25	15–25	19–25			47–75	P2 P3
18 Jul	20:00	Mexico	0–3	Argentina	19–25	18–25	15–25			52–75	P2 P3
19 Jul	18:00	Serbia	3–2	Argentina	20–25	16–25	25–20	26–24	17–15	104–109	P2 P3
19 Jul	20:00	Mexico	1–3	Peru	21–25	25–22	17–25	14–25		77–97	P2 P3
20 Jul	18:00	Peru	1–3	Argentina	25–19	22–25	15–25	23–25		85–94	P2 P3
20 Jul	20:00	Mexico	0–3	Serbia	21–25	20–25	17–25			58–75	P2 P3

=== Pool H ===
Pos	Team	Pld	W	L	Pts	SW	SL	SR	SPW	SPL	SPR	Qualification
1	Italy	3	3	0	9	9	0	MAX	225	149	1.510	9th–12th semifinals
2	Dominican Republic	3	2	1	6	6	3	2.000	218	172	1.267	9th–12th semifinals
3	Cuba	3	1	2	3	3	6	0.500	167	206	0.811	13th–16th semifinals
4	Egypt	3	0	3	0	0	9	0.000	142	225	0.631	13th–16th semifinals

Date	Time		Score		Set 1	Set 2	Set 3	Set 4	Set 5	Total	Report
18 Jul	13:00	Dominican Republic	3–0	Cuba	25–18	25–17	25–16			75–51	P2 P3
18 Jul	15:00	Egypt	0–3	Italy	17–25	17–25	6–25			40–75	P2 P3
19 Jul	13:00	Italy	3–0	Cuba	25–15	25–11	25–15			75–41	P2 P3
19 Jul	15:00	Dominican Republic	3–0	Egypt	25–13	25–14	25–19			75–46	P2 P3
20 Jul	13:00	Egypt	0–3	Cuba	19–25	22–25	15–25			56–75	P2 P3
20 Jul	15:00	Dominican Republic	0–3	Italy	23–25	23–25	22–25			68–75	P2 P3

== Final round ==
- All times are Central Daylight Time Zone (UTC−05:00).

=== Classification 13th–16th ===
13th–16th semifinals
22 Jul
Peru	3
Egypt	0
22 Jul
Cuba	1
Mexico	3

13th place match
23 Jul
Peru	2
Mexico	3
15th place match
23 Jul
Egypt	0
Cuba	3

==== 13th–16th semifinals ====
Date	Time		Score		Set 1	Set 2	Set 3	Set 4	Set 5	Total	Report
22 Jul	13:00	Peru	3–0	Egypt	25–19	25–13	25–14			75–46	P2 P3
22 Jul	15:00	Cuba	1–3	Mexico	21–25	19–25	25–21	16–25		81–96	P2 P3

==== 15th place match ====
Date	Time		Score		Set 1	Set 2	Set 3	Set 4	Set 5	Total	Report
23 Jul	11:00	Egypt	0–3	Cuba	23–25	22–25	21–25			66–75	P2 P3

==== 13th place match ====
Date	Time		Score		Set 1	Set 2	Set 3	Set 4	Set 5	Total	Report
23 Jul	13:00	Peru	2–3	Mexico	17–25	25–22	25–17	23–25	10–15	100–104	P2 P3

=== Classification 9th–12th ===
9th–12th semifinals
22 Jul
Italy	3
Argentina	0
22 Jul
Serbia	3
Dominican Republic	0

9th place match
23 Jul
Italy	3
Serbia	0
11th place match
23 Jul
Argentina	0
Dominican Republic	3

==== 9th–12th semifinals ====
Date	Time		Score		Set 1	Set 2	Set 3	Set 4	Set 5	Total	Report
22 Jul	18:00	Italy	3–0	Argentina	25–21	25–17	25–20			75–58	P2 P3
22 Jul	20:00	Serbia	3–0	Dominican Republic	25–18	25–20	25–23			75–61	P2 P3

==== 11th place match ====
Date	Time		Score		Set 1	Set 2	Set 3	Set 4	Set 5	Total	Report
23 Jul	15:00	Argentina	0–3	Dominican Republic	20–25	17–25	19–25			56–75	P2 P3

==== 9th place match ====
Date	Time		Score		Set 1	Set 2	Set 3	Set 4	Set 5	Total	Report
23 Jul	17:00	Italy	3–0	Serbia	25–20	25–19	25–15			75–54	P2 P3

=== Classification 5th–8th ===
5th–8th semifinals
22 Jul
Poland	3
United States	1
22 Jul
Bulgaria	1
Brazil	3

5th place match
23 Jul
Poland	1
Brazil	3
7th place match
23 Jul
United States	3
Bulgaria	2

==== 5th–8th semifinals ====
Date	Time		Score		Set 1	Set 2	Set 3	Set 4	Set 5	Total	Report
22 Jul	13:00	Poland	3–1	United States	25–14	25–16	20–25	25–20		95–75	P2 P3
22 Jul	15:00	Bulgaria	1–3	Brazil	25–22	10–25	17–25	14–25		66–97	P2 P3

==== 7th place match ====
Date	Time		Score		Set 1	Set 2	Set 3	Set 4	Set 5	Total	Report
23 Jul	13:00	United States	3–2	Bulgaria	25–16	19–25	19–25	25–16	15–9	103–91	P2 P3

==== 5th place match ====
Date	Time		Score		Set 1	Set 2	Set 3	Set 4	Set 5	Total	Report
23 Jul	15:00	Poland	1–3	Brazil	17–25	21–25	29–27	21–25		88–102	P2 P3

=== Final four ===
Semifinals
22 Jul
China	3
Turkey	0
22 Jul
Russia	3
Japan	2

Final
23 Jul
China	3
Russia	0
3rd place match
23 Jul
Turkey	2
Japan	3

==== Semifinals ====
Date	Time		Score		Set 1	Set 2	Set 3	Set 4	Set 5	Total	Report
22 Jul	18:00	China	3–0	Turkey	25–20	25–21	25–17			75–58	P2 P3
22 Jul	20:00	Russia	3–2	Japan	32–30	25–19	23–25	23–25	15–12	118–111	P2 P3

==== 3rd place match ====
Date	Time		Score		Set 1	Set 2	Set 3	Set 4	Set 5	Total	Report
23 Jul	18:00	Turkey	2–3	Japan	25–19	20–25	25–18	20–25	12–15	102–102	P2 P3

==== Final ====
Date	Time		Score		Set 1	Set 2	Set 3	Set 4	Set 5	Total	Report
23 Jul	20:30	China	3–0	Russia	25–22	25–22	25–16			75–60	P2 P3

== Final standing ==
Rank	Team
1st place, gold medalist(s)	China
2nd place, silver medalist(s)	Russia
3rd place, bronze medalist(s)	Japan
4	Turkey
5	Brazil
6	Poland
7	United States
8	Bulgaria
9	Italy
10	Serbia
11	Dominican Republic
12	Argentina
13	Mexico
14	Peru
15	Cuba
16	Egypt

2017 Women's U20 World champions

China
3rd title

12–man roster
Yang Hanyu, Chen Peiyan, Cai Yaqian (c), Zhang Yuqian, Xie Xing, Guan Ruige, Zang Qianqian, Cai Xiaoqing, Wu Han, Fang Jing, Xu Xiaoting, Liu Jiayuan
Head coach
Mang Shen

== Awards ==
- Most Valuable Player
  (China) Yang Hanyu
- Best setter
  (Japan) Tamaki Matsui
- Best outside spikers
  (China) Wu Han
  (Turkey) Tuğba Şenoğlu
- Best middle blockers
  (Turkey) Zehra Güneş
  (China) Yang Hanyu
- Best opposite spiker
  (Russia) Anna Kotikova
- Best libero
  (Brazil) Nyeme Costa

== See also ==
- 2017 FIVB Volleyball Men's U21 World Championship
