= Cai Xiaoqing =

Chinese film director

Cai Xiaoqing (born 1942, Chinese: 蔡晓晴), born in Yan'an City, Shaanxi Province, is a director from the People's Republic of China. She is the daughter of Cai Ruohong (Chinese: 蔡若虹).

== Biography ==
Cai Xiaoqing spent her childhood in the Shaan-Gan-Ning and Jin-Cha-Ji Border Region. In 1961, she studied at the Directing Department of the Beijing Film Academy. In 1973, she became a choreographer and director in the Literature Department of the China Central Television (CCTV). In 1978, she directed her debut television series Three Families' Kindred Spirits. In 1979, she directed the inspirational love drama There is a Young Man (Chinese: 有一个青年), which won the first prize at the 1st Chinese TV Drama Flying Apsaras Awards. In 1980, she directed the TV series "Smile".

In 1981, she directed the TV drama The Deep Love of the Earth (Chinese: 大地的深情), which won the Second Prize of the 2nd Chinese TV Drama Flying Apsaras Award. 1982, she directed the emotional drama The Wasted Years (Chinese: 蹉跎岁月) starring Guo Xuxin and Xiao Xiong, which won the Outstanding Serial Drama Award of the 1st Popular TV Golden Eagle Award, the First Prize of the Long TV Drama Award of the 3rd Chinese TV Drama Flying Apsaras Award, and she was awarded the Outstanding Director Award of the 3rd Chinese TV Drama Flying Apsaras Award for this drama.

In 1983, she directed the TV drama Red Leaves, Over the Mountain (Chinese: 红叶，在山那边), and in 1985, she directed the sports drama Chinese Girl, which starred Zhu Zhaolong, Pu Cunxin, and Ren Mei, and in 1987, she directed the TV drama Prelude to the Great Competition, and in 1988, she directed the TV drama Tutoring, which was awarded the Second Prize of Serial Drama in the 9th Flying Apex Award of Chinese TV Drama. In 1989, Cai Xiaoqing was awarded the title of "March 8th Red Banner Bearer" by the All-China Women's Federation.

In 1994, she co-directed the costume TV series Romance of the Three Kingdoms with Zhang Shaolin, Sun Guangming, Zhang Zhongyi and Shen Haofang, which won the First Prize of the 15th Chinese TV Drama Flying Sky Award for long-running dramas, and the 13th Golden Eagle Award for the best long-running serials in the Popular TV Awards. In 1996, she co-directed the TV drama The Man in the Black Face (Chinese: 黑脸汉子), which starred Chang Xiaoyang.

In 2001, she directed the costume drama Princess Wencheng (Chinese: 文成公主), and in 2004, she directed the drama Brothers, Brothers, and in 2006, he directed the war drama Storm in the Yang City (Chinese: 羊城风暴), co-starring Cui Yi and Pan Juan, and in February 2007, she directed the drama The Sons and Daughters of the Red Flag Canal (Chinese: 红旗渠的儿女们), which starred Chen Sicheng, Li Xinyi, and Duan Yihong.
