= 2002 FIVB World Grand Prix squads =

This article show all participating team squads at the 2002 FIVB Women's Volleyball World Grand Prix, played by eight countries from 12 July to 4 August 2002 with the final round held in Hong Kong Coliseum, Hong Kong.

== Brazil ==
The following is the Brazil roster in the 2002 FIVB World Grand Prix.

#	Name	Shirt name	Date of birth	Height (cm)	Weight (kg)	Spike (cm)	Block (cm)	Club
1	Ângela Moraes	Angela	15 October 1972	180	69	311	298	Minas T.C., BRA
2	Elisângela Oliveira	Elisângela	30 October 1978	184	81	302	282	Rexona, BRA
3	Sheilla Castro	Sheilla	1 July 1983	186	64	302	284	Minas T.C., BRA
4	Luciana Nascimento	Luciana	7 June 1980	189	75	310	291	E.C.Pinheiros, São Paulo, BRA
5	Fabiana de Oliveira	Fabiana	7 March 1980	166	54	276	266	A.C. Fluminense, BRA
6	Jaqueline Carvalho	Jaqueline	31 December 1983	186	73	302	286	ADC BCN, BRA
7	Cecília Menezes	Ciça	1 February 1982	181	68	305	288	E. C. Pinheiros, BRA
8	Valeska Menezes	Valeskinha	23 April 1976	180	62	302	290	ADC BCN, BRA
9	Gisele Cristina Florentino	Gisele	1 August 1973	180	71	282	278	A.C.Fluminense, BRA
10	Wélissa Gonzaga	Sassá	9 September 1982	180	73	300	287	Parana Volei Clube, BRA
11	Karin Rodrigues	Karin	8 November 1971	187	77	309	285	A.C. Fluminense, BRA
12	Alessandra Fratoni	Alessandra	30 December 1981	181	73	305	299	Sao Caetano E.C., BRA
13	Katia Rodrigues	Kátia	17 May 1979	182	64	304	290	E.C. Pinheiros, BRA
14	Fabiana Berto	F. Berto	23 January 1976	178	63	286	274	Parana Volei Clube, BRA
15	Marina Daloca	Marina	8 September 1979	185	75	305	299	Minas T.C., BRA
16	Marcelle Rodrigues	Marcelle	17 October 1976	181	69	303	289	ADC BCN, BRA
17	Paula Pequeno	Paula	22 January 1982	184	74	302	285	ADC BCN, BRA
18	Arlene Xavier	Arlene	20 December 1969	177	74	299	290	ADC BCN, BRA

== China ==
The following is the China roster in the 2002 FIVB World Grand Prix.

#	Name	Shirt name	Date of birth	Height (cm)	Weight (kg)	Spike (cm)	Block (cm)	Club
1	Zhang Jing	J. Zhang	14 October 1979	190	75	324	314	Shanghai, CHN
2	Feng Kun	K. Feng	28 December 1978	183	75	319	310	Beijing, Beijing
3	Yang Hao	H. Yang	21 March 1980	183	75	319	314	Liaoning, CHN
4	Liu Yanan	Y.N. Liu	29 September 1980	186	73	320	313	Liaoning, CHN
5	Wu Yongmei	Y.M. Wu	1 January 1975	186	75	310	300	Army, CHN
6	Li Shan	S. Li	21 May 1980	185	72	317	300	Tianjin, CHN
7	Zhou Suhong	S.H. Zhou	23 April 1979	182	75	313	305	Zhejiang, Hangzhou CHN
8	Zhao Ruirui	R.R. Zhao	2 November 1981	196	75	326	315	Army, CHN
9	Zhang Yuehong	Y.H. Zhang	9 November 1975	182	73	324	322	Liaoning, CHN
10	Chen Jing	J. Chen	3 September 1975	182	75	312	306	Sichuan, CHN
11	He Qing	Q.He	2 May 1982	185	70	308	298	Shanghai, CHN
12	Song Nina	N. N.Song	7 April 1980	179	65	303	293	Army, CHN
13	Li Ying	Y.LI	22 June 1979	180	65	315	306	Liaoning, CHN
14	Lin Hanying	H.Y. Lin	20 July 1978	184	71	312	308	Fujian, CHN
15	Xiong Zi	Z. Xiong	8 November 1976	181	65	310	300	Sichuan, CHN
16	Dong Lingou	L.O. Dong	27 October 1981	186	77	315	301	Army, CHN
17	Li Juan	J.Li	10 April 1982	187	72	315	305	Tianjin, CHN
18	Zhang Ping	Zhang	23 March 1982	187	73	312	301	Tianjin, CHN

== Cuba ==
The following is the Cuba roster in the 2002 FIVB World Grand Prix.

#	Name	Shirt name	Date of birth	Height (cm)	Weight (kg)	Spike (cm)	Block (cm)	Club
1	Yumilka Ruiz	Ruiz	8 May 1978	179	62	329	315	Camaguey, CUB
2	Yanelis Santos	Santos A.	30 March 1986	183	71	315	312	Ciego de Avilas, CUB
3	Nancy Carrillo	Carrilo de la Paz	11 January 1986	190	74	318	315	Ciudad Habana, CUB
4	Misleidis Martínez	Martinez Adlum	3 September 1983	176	70	320	318	Ciudad Habana, CUB
5	Maybelis Martínez	Martinez	13 June 1977	182	79	322	306	Ciudad Habana, CUB
6	Yilian Olivera Yut	Olivera Yut	27 July 1983	187	73	310	307	Pinar del Rio, CUB
7	Yoslan Muñoz	Munoz Garcia	19 February 1980	183	72	326	312	Ciudad Habana
8	Yaima Ortíz	Ortiz Charro	9 November 1981	179	70	325	313	C. Habana, CUB
9	Indira Mestre	Mestre	21 April 1979	183	73	322	311	Ciudad Habana, CUB
10	Regla Torres	Torres	12 February 1975	191	75	331	315	Ciudad Habana, CUB
11	Liana Mesa	Mesa	26 December 1977	179	70	318	307	Camaguey, CUB
12	Rosir Calderón	Calderon Diaz	28 December 1984	191	66	330	325	Ciuda Habana, CUB
13	Anniara Muñoz	Munoz	24 January 1980	180	69	320	312	Cienfuegos, CUB
14	Marlenis Costa	Costa	30 July 1973	179	78	315	310	Pinar Del Rio
15	Marhta Zamora	Zamora Gil	15 October 1983	187	67	319	318	Las Tunas, CUB
16	Dulce Téllez	Tellez Palacio	12 September 1983	186	69	320	316	Santiago, CUB
17	Marta Sánchez	Sanchez	17 May 1973	182	75	324	310	Holguin, CUB
18	Zoila Barros	Barros	6 August 1976	188	76	325	312	Ciudad Habana, CUB

== Germany ==
The following is the Germany roster in the 2002 FIVB World Grand Prix.

#	Name	Shirt name	Date of birth	Height (cm)	Weight (kg)	Spike (cm)	Block (cm)	Club
1	Hanka Pachale	Pachale	12 September 1976	190	74	316	299	Romanelli Firenze, ITA
2	Béatrice Dömeland	Doemeland	4 August 1973	178	63	300	287	Dresdner SC, GER
3	Tanja Hart	Hart	24 January 1974	176	70	291	275	DJK Karbach, GER
4	Kerstin Tzscherlich	Tzscherlich	15 February 1978	179	75	295	282	Dresdner SC, GER
5	Sylvia Roll	Roll	29 May 1973	180	72	308	286	Vini Monte Schiavo Jesi, ITA
6	Julia Schlecht	Schlecht	16 March 1980	182	67	298	277	Bayer Leverkusen, GER
7	Ulrike Jurk	Jurk	4 March 1979	175	68	293	281	Schweriner SC, GER
8	Adina Hinze	Hinze	4 July 1983	182	68	313	292	Volley Cats Berlin, GER
9	Christina Benecke	Benecke	14 October 1974	190	80	314	291	Romanelli Firenze, ITA
10	Jana Müller	Mueller	24 May 1978	184	68	314	293	Schweriner SC, GER
11	Christina Schultz	Schultz	10 November 1969	190	78	314	293	Schweriner SC, GER
12	Olessya Kulakova	Kulakova	31 January 1977	190	70	315	298	Schweriner SC, GER
13	Atika Bouagaa	Bouagaa	22 May 1982	182	69	306	289	USC Münster, GER
14	Kathy Radzuweit	Radzuweit	2 March 1982	196	72	319	300	Volley Cats Berlin, GER
15	Angelina Grün	Gruen	2 December 1979	185	67	309	287	Volley Modena, ITA
16	Judith Sylvester	Sylvester	13 October 1977	193	85	312	296	USC Münster, GER
17	Birgit Thumm	Thumm	3 July 1980	184	70	310	289	DJK Karbach, GER
18	Verena Veh	Veh	4 November 1977	190	95	319	298	SSV Blautal Center Ulm, GER

== Japan ==
The following is the Japan roster in the 2002 FIVB World Grand Prix.

#	Name	Shirt name	Date of birth	Height (cm)	Weight (kg)	Spike (cm)	Block (cm)	Club
1	Minako Onuki	Onuki	15 October 1972	173	66	300	289	NEC Red Rockets, JPN
2	Chikako Kumamae	Kimamae	11 April 1974	180	65	304	295	Toray Arrows, JPN
3	Yuka Sakurai	Sakurai	2 September 1974	167	56	285	270	Denso Airybees, JPN
4	Keiko Tsuruta	Tsuruta	12 July 1975	168	60	293	283	Hisamitsu Spring Attackers, JP
5	Shinako Tanaka	Tanaka	28 July 1975	172	62	294	284	NEC Red Rockets, JPN
6	Kumiko Sakino	Sakino	23 September 1975	180	63	313	300	Hisamitsu Spring Attackers
7	Kanako Omura	Omura	15 December 1976	184	70	319	290	Hisamitsu Spring Attackers, JP
8	Hisako Mukai	Mukai	1 March 1978	177	67	307	295	Toray Arrows, Shiga, JPN
9	Sachiko Kodama	Kodama	15 September 1978	171	59	277	268	Toray Arrows, Shiga, JPN
10	Junko Tsubone	Tsubone	10 May 1978	174	63	287	277	NEC Red Rockets, Kanagawa, JPN
11	Miyuki Takahashi	Takahashi	25 December 1978	170	67	290	276	NEC Red Rockets, Kanagawa, JPN
12	Makiko Horai	Horai	6 January 1979	187	62	308	290	JT Marvelous, Nishinomiya, JPN
13	Yūko Sano	Sano	26 July 1979	158	53	260	254	Toray Arrows, Shiga, JPN
14	Sachiko Sugiyama	Sugiyama	19 October 1979	183	63	305	292	NEC Red Rockets, Kanagawa, JPN
15	Ai Ōtomo	Otomo	24 March 1982	183	70	312	305	NEC Red Rockets, Kanagawa, JPN
16	Sayoko Matsusaki	Matsuzaki	23 August 1982	181	69	300	283	NEC Red Rockets, Kanagawa, JPN
17	Nene Tomita	Tomita	30 September 1982	183	70	291	280	Toray Arrows, Shiga, JPN
18	Megumi Kawamura	Kawamura	12 July 1983	193	67	303	293	NEC Red Rockets, Kanagawa, JPN

== Russia ==
The following is the Russia roster in the 2002 FIVB World Grand Prix.

#	Name	Shirt name	Date of birth	Height (cm)	Weight (kg)	Spike (cm)	Block (cm)	Club
1	Tatiana Gorchkova	Gorchkova	8 March 1981	198	75	314	305	Uralochka, RUS
2	Natalya Morozova	Morozova	28 January 1973	188	74	305	291	Uralochka, RUS
3	Anastasiya Belikova	Belikova	22 July 1979	192	78	310	300	Uralochka, RUS
4	Aleksandra Korukovets	Korukovets	1 October 1976	182	72	303	298	Universitet, Belgorod, RUS
5	Lyubov Chachkova	Chachkova	4 December 1977	192	73	310	304	Uralochka, RUS
6	Yelena Godina	Godina	17 September 1977	196	72	317	310	Uralochka, RUS
7	Natalya Safronova	Safronova	6 August 1979	188	74	317	305	Uralochka, RUS
8	Yevgeniya Artamonova	Artamonova	17 July 1975	191	74	312	306	Uralochka, RUS
9	Elizaveta Tichtchenko	Tichtchenko	7 February 1975	190	74	309	302	Uralochka, RUS
10	Yelena Vasilevskaya	Vassilevskaia	27 February 1978	176	77	296	290	Uralochka, RUS
11	Yekaterina Gamova	Gamova	17 October 1980	204	82	321	310	Uralochka, RUS
12	Tatyana Gratcheva	Gratcheva	23 February 1973	180	74	300	290	Uralochka, RUS
13	Ielena Konstantinova	Konstantinova	25 August 1981	190	74	310	304	CSKA, RUS
14	Yelena Plotnikova	Plotnikova	26 July 1978	185	73	306	298	Uralochka, RUS
15	Anjela Gourieva	Gourieva	2 September 1980	195	73	310	303	Uralochka, RUS
16	Kira Iakimova	Iakimova	22 March 1983	182	74	302	297	Uralochka, Russia
17	Olga Chukanova	Tchoukanova	9 June 1980	181	69	302	294	Uralochka, RUS
18	Anna Artamonova	Artamonova	27 September 1980	188	70	306	296	Uralochka, RUS

== Thailand ==
The following is the Thailand roster in the 2002 FIVB World Grand Prix.

#	Name	Shirt name	Date of birth	Height (cm)	Weight (kg)	Spike (cm)	Block (cm)	Club
1	Wanna Buakaew	B.Wanna	2 January 1981	176	51	287	269	Pepsi, Bangkok, Thailand
2	Sommai Niyompon	N.Sommai	28 September 1984	173	66	300	293	Pepsi, Bangkok, Thailand
3	Anna Paijinda	P.Anna	3 April 1974	176	65	295	285	Rerothai, Bangkok
4	Nurak Nokputta	N.Nurak	30 January 1982	179	63	295	280	Pepsi, Bangkok, Thailand
5	Pleumjit Thinkaow	T.Pleumjit	9 November 1983	183	63	289	279	Pepsi, Bangkok, Thailand
6	Saranya Srisakorn	S.Saranya	11 May 1975	178	62	293	278	Aerothai, Bangkok, Thailand
7	Narumon Khanan	K.Narumol	26 January 1983	180	64	286	278	Pepsi, Bangkok, Thailand
8	Suphap Phongthong	P.Suphap	16 May 1981	178	61	290	276	Pepsi, Bangkok, Thailand
9	Piyamas Koijapo	K.Piyamas	23 October 1978	183	67	295	282	Pepsi, Bangkok, Thailand
10	Nantakan Petchplay	P.Nantakan	21 March 1977	176	62	278	271	Aerothai, Bkk, Thailand
11	Amporn Hyapha	Y.Aumporn	19 May 1985	182	65	290	285	Ptt, Bkk, Thailand
12	Warapan Thinprabat	T.Warapan	6 November 1982	180	70	288	273	Bangkok Bank, Bkk, Thailand
13	Wanlapa Jid-ong	J.Wanlapa	2 June 1977	170	60	274	268	Pepsi, Bkk, Thailand
14	Patcharee Sangmuang	S.Patcharee	20 March 1978	181	66	294	279	Ptt, Bkk, Thailand
15	Ladda Duanchai	D. Ladda	3 October 1980	170	61	272	264	Rbac, Bkk, Thailand
16	Wisuta Heebkaew	H. Wisuta	1 February 1980	176	61	288	278	Rbac, Kk, Thailand
17	Junjira Wongchalee	W. Junjira	18 February 1984	178	63	293	275	Pepsi, Bkk, Thailand
18	Bouard Lithawat	L. Bu-Ard	20 July 1984	180	68	293	278	Pepsi, Bangkok, Thailand

== United States ==
The following is the United States roster in the 2002 FIVB World Grand Prix.

#	Name	Shirt name	Date of birth	Height (cm)	Weight (kg)	Spike (cm)	Block (cm)	Club
1	Prikeba Phipps	Phipps	30 June 1969	191	77	319	303	Volley Bergamo, ITA
2	Danielle Scott	Scott	1 October 1972	188	84	325	302	Pioneer Red Wings, JPN
3	Tayyiba Haneef	Haneef	23 March 1979	200	80	318	299	USA National Team, USA
4	Nina Puikkonen	Puikkonen	3 August 1979	191	78	306	298	Brigham Young University, USA
5	Stacy Sykora	Sykora	24 June 1977	176	61	305	295	Olympia Teodora, ITA
6	Elisabeth Bachman	Bachman	7 November 1978	192	82	318	295	Minnesota Chill, USA
7	Heather Bown	Bown	29 November 1978	188	90	301	290	Olympia Teodora, ITA
8	Elisabeth Fitzgerald	Fitzgerald	15 July 1980	180	66	301	291	USA National Team, USA
9	Therese Crawford	Crawford	26 August 1976	178	64	312	304	Volley Modena, ITA
10	Stephanie Hagen	Hagen	26 August 1979	190	79	308	301	USA National Team, USA
11	Robyn Ah Mow-Santos	Ah Mow-Santos	15 September 1975	170	66	291	281	Vicenza Volley, ITA
12	Candace McNamee	McNamee	13 June 1980	180	66	300	296	USA National Team, USA
13	Tara Cross-Battle	Cross-Battle	16 September 1968	180	71	302	301	Volley Bergamo, ITA
14	Cheryl Weaver	Weaver	22 March 1980	187	84	310	302	USA National Team, USA
15	Logan Tom	Tom	25 May 1981	184	80	306	297	Stanford University, USA
16	Sarah Noriega	Noriega	24 April 1976	189	70	302	301	A.S. Pallovolo Firenze, ITA
17	Kristee Porter	Porter	7 May 1980	183	71	303	299	Chicago Thunder, USA
18	Nancy Metcalf	Metcalf	12 November 1978	184	73	314	292	Indias De Mayaguez, PUR
