= Russia women's national under-21 volleyball team =

Youth volleyball team representing Russia

Russia U20
- Association: Volleyball Federation Of Russia

Uniforms
Home	Away	Third

FIVB U21 World Championship
- Appearances: 11 (First in 1995)
- Best result: (gold) Champions : (1997, 1999)

CEV Europe U19 Championship
- Appearances: 13 (First in 1994)
- Best result: (gold) Champions : (1994. 2016)
- www.volley.ru (in Russian)

The Russia women's national under-20 volleyball team represents Russia in international women's volleyball competitions and friendly matches under the age 20 and it is ruled by the Russian Volleyball Federation that is a member of the Federation of International Volleyball (FIVB) and also a part of the European Volleyball Confederation (CEV).

In response to the 2022 Russian invasion of Ukraine, the International Volleyball Federation suspended all Russian national teams, clubs, and officials, as well as beach and snow volleyball athletes, from all events. The European Volleyball Confederation (CEV) also banned all Russian national teams, clubs, and officials from participating in European competition, and suspended all members of Russia from their respective functions in CEV organs.

== Results ==
=== FIVB U20 World Championship ===
Champions Runners up Third place Fourth place

FIVB U20 World Championship
Year	Round	Position	Pld	W	L	SW	SL	Squad
(Brazil) 1977	See Soviet Union							
(Mexico) 1981	See Soviet Union							
(Italy) 1985	See Soviet Union							
(South Korea) 1987	See Soviet Union							
(Peru) 1989	See Soviet Union							
(Czechoslovakia) 1991	See Soviet Union							
(Brazil) 1993	Didn't Qualify							
(Thailand) 1995	Semifinals	Third place	7	6	1	20	5	Squad
(Poland) 1997	Final	1st place	7	7	0	21	4	Squad
(Canada) 1999	Final	1st place	7	7	0	21	4	Squad
(Dominican Republic) 2001	Didn't Qualify							
(Thailand) 2003	5th–8th places	8th place	7	2	5	16	16	Squad
(Turkey) 2005	5th–8th places	7th place	7	4	3	14	10	Squad
(Thailand) 2007	Didn't Qualify							
(Mexico) 2009	Didn't Qualify							
(Peru) 2011	9th–12th places	10th place	8	5	3	17	13	Squad
(Czech Republic) 2013	5th–8th places	6th place	8	5	3	17	13	Squad
(Puerto Rico) 2015	5th–8th places	7th place	8	4	4	16	14	Squad
(Mexico) 2017	Final	2nd place	8	7	1	21	8	Squad
(Mexico) 2019	Semifinals	3rd place	8	6	2	20	12	Squad
(Belgium) (Netherlands) 2021	Semifinals	3rd place	8	5	3	17	13	Squad
(Mexico) 2023	Banned							
(Indonesia) 2025	Banned							
Total	2 Titles	11/21	83	58	25	200	112	—

=== Europe U19 Championship ===
Champions Runners up Third place Fourth place

Europe U19 Championship
Year	Round	Position	Pld	W	L	SW	SL	Squad
(Hungary) 1966	See Soviet Union							
(Soviet Union) 1969	See Soviet Union							
(Italy) 1971	See Soviet Union							
(Netherlands) 1973	See Soviet Union							
(West Germany) 1975	See Soviet Union							
(Socialist Federal Republic of Yugoslavia) 1977	See Soviet Union							
(Spain) 1979	See Soviet Union							
(West Germany) 1982	See Soviet Union							
(France) 1984	See Soviet Union							
(Bulgaria) 1986	See Soviet Union							
(Italy) 1988	See Soviet Union							
(Austria) 1990	See Soviet Union							
(Greece) 1992	Competed as CIS							
(Hungary) 1994		1st place						Squad
(Turkey) 1996		2nd place						Squad
(Belgium) 1998		2nd place						Squad

Europe U19 Championship
Year	Round	Position	Pld	W	L	SW	SL	Squad
(Switzerland) 2000		4th place						Squad
(Croatia) 2002		6th place						Squad
(Slovakia) 2004		Third place						Squad
(France) 2006		4th place						Squad
(Italy) 2008		2nd place						Squad
(Serbia) 2010		7th place						Squad
(Turkey) 2012		4th place						Squad
(Finland) / (Estonia) 2014		7th place						Squad
(Hungary) / (Slovakia) 2016		1st place						Squad
(Albania) 2018		2nd place						Squad
(Bosnia and Herzegovina) (Croatia) 2020	Withdrew due to travel restrictions imposed by COVID-19 pandemic							Squad
(North Macedonia) 2022	Disqualified for invading Ukraine							Squad
Total	2 Titles	13/28						

== Team ==
=== Recent squad ===
The following was the Russian roster in the 2019 FIVB Volleyball Women's U20 World Championship.

Head coach: Igor Kurnosov

No.	Name	Date of birth	Height	Weight	Spike	Block	2019 club
1	Varvara Shepeleva	7 August 2001	1.81 m (5 ft 11 in)	68 kg (150 lb)	295 cm (116 in)	280 cm (110 in)	(Russia) Severyanka
3	Alexandra Borisova	20 June 2001	1.88 m (6 ft 2 in)	84 kg (185 lb)	305 cm (120 in)	297 cm (117 in)	(Russia) Severyanka
4	Eseniia Mishagina	12 January 2001	1.78 m (5 ft 10 in)	64 kg (141 lb)	290 cm (110 in)	280 cm (110 in)	(Russia) Dinamo Krasnodar
5	Viktoriia Pushina	9 March 2000	1.97 m (6 ft 6 in)	88 kg (194 lb)	310 cm (120 in)	302 cm (119 in)	(Russia) Severyanka
7	Olga Zvereva	5 March 2000	1.86 m (6 ft 1 in)	74 kg (163 lb)	290 cm (110 in)	281 cm (111 in)	(Russia) Dinamo Krasnodar
8	Ekaterina Pipunyrova	10 February 2000	1.88 m (6 ft 2 in)	69 kg (152 lb)	305 cm (120 in)	297 cm (117 in)	(Russia) Dinamo Krasnodar
10	Veronika Rasputnaia	29 August 2001	1.77 m (5 ft 10 in)	71 kg (157 lb)	295 cm (116 in)	285 cm (112 in)	(Russia) UZGU Atom
11	Yulia Brovkina	31 May 2001	1.96 m (6 ft 5 in)	70 kg (150 lb)	305 cm (120 in)	297 cm (117 in)	(Russia) Lokomotiv Kaliningrad
14	Polina Shemanova	21 January 2001	1.82 m (6 ft 0 in)	55 kg (121 lb)	296 cm (117 in)	290 cm (110 in)	(Russia) Nevskiye Zvezdy
15	Valeriya Shevchuk (C)	19 February 2001	1.82 m (6 ft 0 in)	60 kg (130 lb)	302 cm (119 in)	297 cm (117 in)	(Russia) Lokomotiv Kaliningrad
17	Elizaveta Fitisova	21 September 2001	1.87 m (6 ft 2 in)	66 kg (146 lb)	305 cm (120 in)	295 cm (116 in)	(Russia) Uralochka-NTMK
18	Oxana Yakushina	24 January 2001	1.91 m (6 ft 3 in)	73 kg (161 lb)	305 cm (120 in)	297 cm (117 in)	(Russia) Lipetsk

== Former squads ==
=== U20 World Championship ===
- 1997 — Gold medal
  Elena Vassilevskaya, Irina Tebenikhina, Anna Artamonova, Olga Chukanova, Anastasia Belikova, Natalia Safronova, Ekaterina Gamova, Anjela Gourieva, Marina Ivanova, Tatiana Gorchkova, Elena Plotnikova and Ekaterina Shitselova
- 1999 — Gold medal
  Anna Artamonova, Olga Chukanova, Anjela Gourieva, Ekaterina Gamova, Elena Konstantinova, Valeria Pouchnenkova, Tatiana Gorchkova, Olga Konovalova, Olessia Makarova, Anna Velikanova, Ekaterina Shitselova and Evguenia Kuzianina
- 2003 — 8th place
  Natalia Korobkova, Anna Moisseenko, Ekaterina Margatskaya, Viktoria Podkopaeva, Yulia Merkulova, Anna Gouryanova (c), Maria Borodakova, Irina Sukhova, Anna Zayko, Svetlana Akulova, Natalia Gladysheva and Zhanna Novikova
- 2005 — 7th place
  Tatiana Alizarova, Tatiana Soldatova, Anna Beskova, Anastasia Prisyagina, Ekaterina Kabeshova, Ekaterina Orlova, Anna Kosnyreva (c), Anastasia Markova, Ekaterina Gromova, Vera Ulyakina, Elena Irisova and Anna Arbuzova
- 2011 — 10th place
  Maria Ivonkina, Yana Manzyuk, Ekaterina Petrova, Ekaterina Lavrova, Alina Yaroshik (c), Valeria Safonova, Anastasia Lyapushkina, Anastasia Anufrienko, Anastasia Bavykina, Alla Galeeva, Alena Golosnova and Natalia Malykh
- 2013 — 6th place
  Ekaterina Makarchuk, Irina Voronkova, Tatiana Romanova, Olga Biryukova, Olesya Nikolaeva, Irina Fetisova, Anna Luneva, Valeriya Zaytseva, Elena Novik (c), Ksenia Ilchenko, Natalia Reshetnikova and Ekaterina Voronova
- 2015 — 7th place
  Angelina Lazarenko, Svetlana Serbina, Ekaterina Shkurikhina, Kristina Kurnosova, Ekaterina Novikova, Victoria Zhurbenko, Angelina Sperskaite (c), Anastasiia Barchuk, Anastasiia Cheremisina, Anna Lazareva, Tatiana Iurinskaia and Sabina Gilfanova
- 2017 — Silver medal
  Angelina Lazarenko, Ksenia Smirnova, Anna Kotikova, Anastasia Stalnaya, Olga Zubareva, Alina Podskalnaya, Aleksandra Oganezova, Anastasiia Stankevichute, Victoria Russu, Daria Ryseva, Elizaveta Kotova and Maria Vorobyeva (c)
- 2019 — Bronze medal
  Varvara Shepeleva, Alexandra Borisova, Eseniia Mishagina, Viktoriia Pushina, Olga Zvereva, Ekaterina Pipunyrova, Veronika Rasputnaia, Yulia Brovkina, Polina Shemanova, Valeriya Shevchuk (c), Elizaveta Fitisova and Oxana Yakushina

=== Europe U19 Championship ===
- 2006 — 4th place
  Elena Boyarkina, Evgeniya Startseva, Lidiya Romanova, Lyudmila Malofeeva, Elena Kovalenko, Irina Kuznetsova, Tatiana Kosheleva, Viktoria Rusakova, Natalia Dianskaya, Olga Fedorchenko, Yuliya Podskalnaya and Alexandra Vinogradova
- 2008 — Silver medal
  Ekaterina Bogacheva, Olga Efimova, Anna Kiseleva, Anastasia Konovalova, Ksenia Naumova, Daria Pisarenko, Irina Smirnova, Ekaterina Pankova, Irina Uraleva, Viktoria Chervova, Olga Shukaylo and Tatiana Shchukina
- 2010 — 7th place
  Maria Ivonkina, Yana Manzyuk, Ekaterina Petrova, Alina Yaroshik (c), Natalia Krotkova, Anastasia Kornienko, Valeria Safonova, Anastasia Lyapushkina, Anastasia Bavykina, Anastasia Komogorova, Alla Galkina and Natalia Malykh
- 2012 — 4th place
  Irina Voronkova, Tatiana Romanova, Maria Bibina, Olesya Nikolaeva, Irina Fetisova, Anna Luneva, Eli Uatarra, Elena Novik (c), Anastasiia Barchuk, Ksenia Ilchenko, Ekaterina Voronova and Rimma Goncharova
- 2014 — 7th place
  Svetlana Serbina, Ekaterina Shkurikhina, Kristina Kurnosova, Ekaterina Novikova, Anastasia Grechanaia, Victoria Zhurbenko, Angelina Sperskaite (c), Anastasiia Barchuk, Anna Lazareva, Tatiana Iurinskaia, Natalia Guskova and Angelina Lazarenko
- 2016 — Gold medal
  Angelina Lazarenko, Inna Balyko, Anna Kotikova, Anastasia Stalnaya, Alina Podskalnaya, Aleksandra Oganezova, Ksenia Pligunova, Anastasiia Stankevichute, Victoria Russu, Elizaveta Kotova, Marina Tushova and Maria Vorobyeva (c)
- 2018 — Silver medal
  Varvara Shepeleva, Tatiana Kadochkina, Alexandra Borisova, Polina Matveeva, Viktoriia Pushina, Olga Zvereva, Ekaterina Pipunyrova, Veronika Rasputnaia, Yulia Brovkina, Irina Soboleva, Valeriya Shevchuk (c) and Oxana Yakushina
