= 1999 FIVB Volleyball Women's U20 World Championship =

1999 FIVB Women's U20 World Championship
Tournament details
- Host country: Canada
- Dates: August 28–September 4, 1999
- Teams: 16
- Venues: 2 (in Edmonton and Saskatoon host cities)

Final positions
- Champions: Russia (3rd title)

Tournament awards
- MVP: (Brazil) Erika Coimbra

The 1999 FIVB Women's U20 World Championship was held in Edmonton, Canada from August 28 to September 4, 1999. 16 teams participated in the tournament. This tournament had to be played at Santo Domingo, Dominican Republic. Due to hurricane was transferred to Canada.

== Qualification process ==
Confederation	Method of Qualification	Date	Venue	Vacancies	Qualified
FIVB	Host			1	Canada *
NORCECA	1998 NORCECA Junior Championship	July 22 – 27, 1998	Cuernavaca, Mexico	2	United States; Mexico
CEV	1998 European Junior Championship	August 22 – 30, 1998	Vilvoorde, Belgium	6	Italy; Russia; Czech Republic; Poland; Yugoslavia; Turkey**
AVC	1998 Asian Junior Championship	September 22 – 29, 1998	Trang, Thailand	3	China; South Korea; Japan
CSV	1998 South American Junior Championship	September 23 – 28, 1998	Santa Fe, Argentina	3	Brazil; Argentina; Venezuela***
CAVB	1998 African Junior Championship			1	Nigeria
Total				16	

- * Canada replaced Dominican Republic due to hurricane's effects.
- ** Turkey replaced Belgium.
- *** Venezuela replaced Peru.

== Pools composition ==
Pool A	Pool B	Pool C	Pool D
United States; Czech Republic; Canada; Turkey	Russia; South Korea; Mexico; Nigeria	China; Japan; Poland; Venezuela	Brazil; Italy; Yugoslavia; Argentina

== Preliminary round ==
=== Pool A ===
Pos	Team	Pld	W	L	Pts	SW	SL	SR	SPW	SPL	SPR	Qualification
1	United States	3	3	0	6	9	0	MAX	225	155	1.452	Seeding group
2	Czech Republic	3	2	1	5	6	3	2.000	208	177	1.175	Elimination group
3	Canada	3	1	2	4	3	8	0.375	213	254	0.839	Elimination group
4	Turkey	3	0	3	3	2	9	0.222	207	267	0.775	Eliminated

Date		Score		Set 1	Set 2	Set 3	Set 4	Set 5	Total
28 Aug	United States	3–0	Canada	25–20	25–14	25–13			75–47
28 Aug	Czech Republic	3–0	Turkey	25–17	25–22	25–14			75–53
29 Aug	Czech Republic	3–0	Canada	25–18	25–19	25–12			75–49
29 Aug	United States	3–0	Turkey	25–23	25–17	25–10			75–50
30 Aug	Canada	3–2	Turkey	28–30	24–26	25–23	25–16	15–9	117–104
30 Aug	United States	3–0	Czech Republic	25–18	25–19	25–21			75–58

=== Pool B ===
Pos	Team	Pld	W	L	Pts	SW	SL	SR	SPW	SPL	SPR	Qualification
1	Russia	3	3	0	6	9	1	9.000	245	149	1.644	Seeding group
2	South Korea	3	2	1	5	7	3	2.333	237	174	1.362	Elimination group
3	Mexico	3	1	2	4	3	6	0.500	162	203	0.798	Elimination group
4	Nigeria	3	0	3	3	0	9	0.000	107	225	0.476	Eliminated

Date		Score		Set 1	Set 2	Set 3	Set 4	Set 5	Total
28 Aug	South Korea	3–0	Mexico	25–13	25–17	25–15			75–45
28 Aug	Russia	3–0	Nigeria	25–9	25–3	25–8			75–20
29 Aug	Mexico	3–0	Nigeria	25–12	25–19	25–22			75–53
29 Aug	Russia	3–1	South Korea	19–25	25–21	25–17	26–24		95–87
30 Aug	South Korea	3–0	Nigeria	25–12	25–13	25–9			75–34
30 Aug	Russia	3–0	Mexico	25–13	25–16	25–13			75–42

=== Pool C ===
Pos	Team	Pld	W	L	Pts	SW	SL	SR	SPW	SPL	SPR	Qualification
1	China	3	3	0	6	9	1	9.000	239	168	1.423	Seeding group
2	Japan	3	2	1	5	6	4	1.500	230	204	1.127	Elimination group
3	Poland	3	1	2	4	5	6	0.833	228	227	1.004	Elimination group
4	Venezuela	3	0	3	3	0	9	0.000	127	225	0.564	Eliminated

Date		Score		Set 1	Set 2	Set 3	Set 4	Set 5	Total
28 Aug	Poland	3–0	Venezuela	25–20	25–11	25–9			75–40
28 Aug	China	3–0	Japan	25–23	25–14	25–20			75–57
29 Aug	Japan	3–0	Venezuela	25–15	25–13	25–19			75–47
29 Aug	China	3–1	Poland	14–25	25–15	25–18	25–13		89–71
30 Aug	China	3–0	Venezuela	25–11	25–11	25–18			75–40
30 Aug	Japan	3–1	Poland	23–25	25–23	25–22	25–12		98–82

=== Pool D ===
Pos	Team	Pld	W	L	Pts	SW	SL	SR	SPW	SPL	SPR	Qualification
1	Brazil	3	3	0	6	9	0	MAX	228	170	1.341	Seeding group
2	Italy	3	2	1	5	6	3	2.000	209	182	1.148	Elimination group
3	Yugoslavia	3	1	2	4	3	8	0.375	212	257	0.825	Elimination group
4	Argentina	3	0	3	3	2	9	0.222	213	253	0.842	Eliminated

Date		Score		Set 1	Set 2	Set 3	Set 4	Set 5	Total
28 Aug	Italy	3–0	Yugoslavia	25–23	25–16	25–18			75–57
28 Aug	Brazil	3–0	Argentina	25–15	25–23	25–21			75–59
29 Aug	Yugoslavia	3–2	Argentina	25–17	13–25	23–25	25–22	17–15	103–104
29 Aug	Brazil	3–0	Italy	25–17	25–19	25–23			75–59
30 Aug	Brazil	3–0	Yugoslavia	25–20	25–17	25–15			78–52
30 Aug	Italy	3–0	Argentina	25–16	25–19	25–15			75–50

== Second round ==
=== Play off – elimination group ===
Date		Score		Set 1	Set 2	Set 3	Set 4	Set 5	Total
31 Aug	Czech Republic	3–0	Mexico	25–22	25–20	25–22			75–64
31 Aug	Poland	3–1	Italy	22–25	27–25	26–24	25–22		100–96
31 Aug	Japan	3–1	Yugoslavia	25–19	25–19	21–25	25–19		96–82
31 Aug	South Korea	3–0	Canada	25–12	25–11	25–11			75–34

=== Play off – seeding group ===
Date		Score		Set 1	Set 2	Set 3	Set 4	Set 5	Total
31 Aug	China	3–0	United States	25–15	25–19	25–19			75–53
31 Aug	Russia	3–2	Brazil	27–25	24–26	15–25	25–20	15–13	106–109

== Final round ==
Quarterfinals
September 2 – Edmonton
Russia	3
Japan	0
September 2 – Edmonton
South Korea	3
United States	1
September 2 – Edmonton
Brazil	3
Poland	0
September 2 – Edmonton
China	3
Czech Republic	0

Semifinals
September 3 – Edmonton
Russia	3
South Korea	1
September 3 – Edmonton
Brazil	3
China	1

Final
September 4 – Edmonton
Russia	3
Brazil	0
3rd place
September 4 – Edmonton
South Korea	3
China	2

5th–8th places
September 3 – Edmonton
Poland	3
Czech Republic	0
September 3 – Edmonton
Japan	3
United States	1

5th place
September 4 – Edmonton
Poland	3
Japan	2
7th place
September 4 – Edmonton
Czech Republic	3
United States	1

=== Quarterfinals ===
Date		Score		Set 1	Set 2	Set 3	Set 4	Set 5	Total
Sep 2	China	3–0	Czech Republic	25–23	25–16	25–15			75–54
Sep 2	South Korea	3–1	United States	25–20	25–21	19–25	28–26		97–92
Sep 2	Brazil	3–0	Poland	25–19	26–24	25–17			76–60
Sep 2	Russia	3–0	Japan	25–18	25–14	25–21			75–53

=== 5th–8th semifinals ===
Date		Score		Set 1	Set 2	Set 3	Set 4	Set 5	Total
Sep 3	Poland	3–0	Czech Republic	25–17	25–23	25–21			75–61
Sep 3	Japan	3–1	United States	25–21	22–25	25–22	25–17		97–85

=== Semifinals ===
Date		Score		Set 1	Set 2	Set 3	Set 4	Set 5	Total
Sep 3	Brazil	3–1	China	25–23	25–13	20–25	25–20		95–81
Sep 3	South Korea	3–1	United States	29–27	20–25	25–19	27–25		101–96

=== 7th place ===
Date		Score		Set 1	Set 2	Set 3	Set 4	Set 5	Total
Sep 4	Czech Republic	3–1	United States	16–25	25–21	25–17	27–25		93–88

=== 5th place ===
Date		Score		Set 1	Set 2	Set 3	Set 4	Set 5	Total
Sep 4	Poland	3–2	Japan	26–24	18–25	25–19	17–25	15–13	101–106

=== 3rd place ===
Date		Score		Set 1	Set 2	Set 3	Set 4	Set 5	Total
Sep 4	South Korea	3–2	China	18–25	25–21	25–16	17–25	15–10	100–97

=== Final ===
Date		Score		Set 1	Set 2	Set 3	Set 4	Set 5	Total
Sep 4	Russia	3–0	Brazil	32–30	25–12	25–20			82–62

== Final standing ==
Rank	Team
1st place, gold medalist(s)	Russia
2nd place, silver medalist(s)	Brazil
3rd place, bronze medalist(s)	South Korea
4	China
5	Poland
6	Japan
7	Czech Republic
8	United States
9	Canada
9	Italy
9	Mexico
9	Yugoslavia
13	Argentina
13	Nigeria
13	Turkey
13	Venezuela

1999 FIVB Women's Junior World champions

Russia
3rd title

12–woman Roster
Anna Artamonova, Olga Chukanova, Anjela Gourieva, Ekaterina Gamova, Elena Konstantinova, Valeria Pouchnenkova, Tatiana Gorchkova, Olga Konovalova, Olessia Makarova, Anna Velikanova, Ekaterina Shitselova and Evguenia Kuzianina

== Individual awards ==
- MVP: (Brazil) Erika Coimbra
- Best scorer: (Russia) Ekaterina Gamova
- Best spiker: (Russia) Valeria Pouchnenkova
- Best blocker: (United States) Sherisa Livingston
- Best server: (Czech Republic) Barbora Novakova
- Best setter: (China) Song Nina
- Best receiver: (South Korea) Eun-Young An
- Best libero: (South Korea) Sun-Ja Son
