= Anna Catharina Wedderkopf =

German businesswoman, consultant and feminist

Anna Catharina Wedderkopf (20 December 1715 – 14 March 1786) was a German businesswoman, consultant, and feminist.

== Life ==
Wedderkopf was born in Lienzingen (today a district of Mühlacker) as the third daughter of Simon Sidler and Jacobina Sidler (born Geissler). After the death of her father, her mother married Johann Jakob Schmidgall. She operated with both the still-existing Gasthaus Hirsch (Inn Deer), in which Anna Catharina was also active.

Anna Catharina Sidler married the 18-years-older jurist Heinrich Johann Wedderkopf on 15 May 1736. Both lived temporarily at Schloss Mühlhausen an der Enz, a castle in Mühlacker. After 28 years of marriage, she moved to Dürrmenz after the divorce. Anna Catharina Wedderkopf had considerable money at this time. Due to a breach of the law, she claimed the right to apply for the tenancy lease from the supreme ducal authorities in Stuttgart. The auction of the Maulbronn concessions to the monastery office was connected to the tenancy lease. These were awarded annually by bid. She was the only woman in Württemberg who did this. The process was also described as a women's revolution at Enz (Weiberrevolte an der Enz). Wedderkopf died at the age of 70 from wound and burn fever in Dürrmenz (today also a district of Mühlacker). Before her death, she set up a foundation for undamaged house arms.

== Literature ==
- Marlis Lippik: Catharina Wedderkopf (1715 - 1786) : Weiberrevolte an der Enz. In: Diana Finkele (Hrsg.): Schwäbinnen und Badenerinnen - Frauenleben in Baden und Württemberg. Stieglitz Verlag, Mühlacker 2004, 3-7987-0375-2, S. 111–113.
- Detlev Kraack, Peter Wulf, Klaus-Joachim Lorenzen-Schmidt: Brückenschläge aus der Vergangenheit: Festschrift für Peter Wulf zu seinem 70. Geburtstag. Wachholtz Verlag, Kiel 2008, 3-5290-2944-0.
