= Tijana Milojević =

Serbian volleyball player

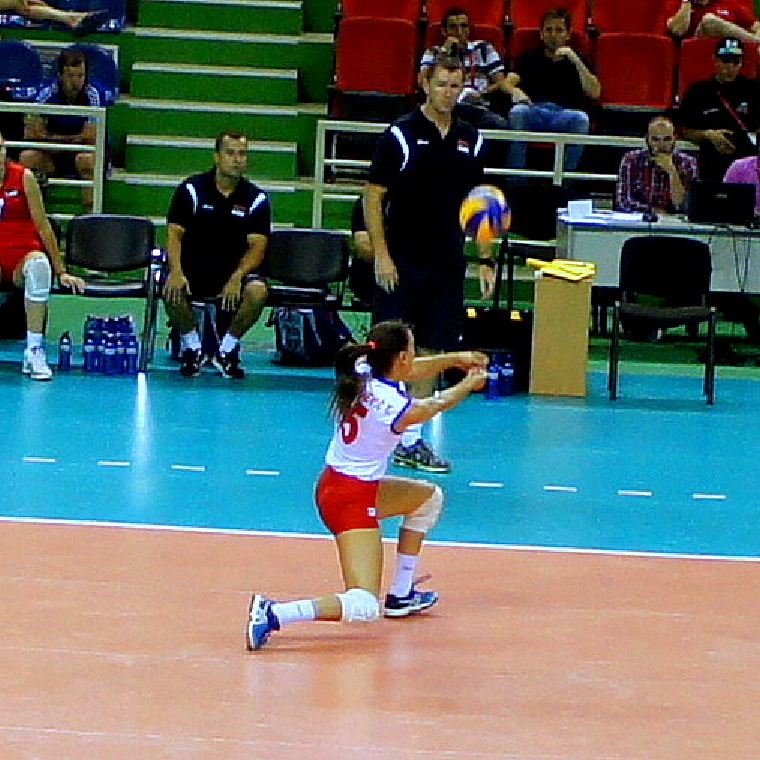
- Milojević in action during the 2015 European Youth Summer Olympic Festival final.

Personal information
- Full name: Tijana Milojević
- Nationality: Serbian
- Born: September 10, 1998 (age 28) Asse, Belgium
- Height: 1.71 m (5 ft 7 in)
- Weight: 53 kg (117 lb)
- Spike: 270 cm (110 in)
- Block: 265 cm (104 in)

Volleyball information
- Position: Libero
- Current club: Radnički Beograd
- Number: 17

Career
- Years: Team
- 2014–2016: (Serbia) Crvena zvezda
- 2017–2021: (United States) Seattle Redhawks
- 2021–2022: (Serbia) Crvena zvezda
- 2022–: (China) Shenzhen Phoenix
- 2022-2023: (Serbia) GŽOK Srem
- 2023-2024: (Serbia) ŽOK Spartak
- 2024-: (Serbia) OK Radnički Beograd

National team
- Years: Team
- 2015–2016: Serbia U18
- 2016–2017: Serbia U19
Honours
U18 European Championship
Silver medal – second place	2015 Samokov/Plovdiv
- Updated on 9 September 2016

Tijana Milojević (Serbian Cyrillic: Тијана Милојевић; born 10 September 1998) is a Belgian-born Serbian volleyball player. She plays for the Radnički Beograd. She was a member of Serbia U18 national volleyball team who earned silver medal in both Girls' Youth European Volleyball Championship and European Youth Olympic Festival in 2015.

== Career ==
Tijana grew up in Crvena zvezda, where she passed all the younger categories. After five years spent studying in the USA and playing for Seattle University, Tijana returned to her home club, Crvena zvezda.

=== National team ===
==== Youth U18 ====
In 2015, Milojević represented Serbia U18 national volleyball team completing the 2015 Girls' Youth European Volleyball Championship which held from 28 March to 5 April. The team reached final beating the likes of Italy and Germany, but lost to Russia in five sets. Despite the lost, she was awarded the best libero in the competition. Three months later, Serbia U18 entered the final again in 2015 European Youth Summer Olympic Festival, but once more fell short in five sets. The match took place on 1 August. Their opponent Turkey led the game by 2–0. Milojević's team won the next two sets, but eventually lost the last set by 8–15.

After qualified through Girls' Youth European Volleyball Championship, Milojević participated with the team in the 2015 FIVB Volleyball Girls' U18 World Championship from 7 August to 16 August. Unfortunately, they lost to eventual winner Italy in the quarterfinals and gained a 5th place overall.

==== Junior U19 ====
In 2016, Milojević was selected in Serbia U19 squad at the 2016 Women's U19 Volleyball European Championship. Serbia earned Silver medal after lost to Russia 0–3 in the final.

== Awards ==
=== Individual ===
- 2015 Girls' Youth European Volleyball Championship Best Libero
- 2016 Junior Women Balkan Volleyball Championship Best Libero

=== National team ===
==== Youth U18 ====
- 2015 Youth Girls Balkan Volleyball Championship
- 2015 Girls' Youth European Volleyball Championship
- 2015 European Youth Summer Olympic Festival

==== Junior U19 ====
- 2016 Junior Women Balkan Volleyball Championship
- 2016 Women's U19 Volleyball European Championship
