= 2015 Girls' Youth European Volleyball Championship =

Tournament details
- Host country: Bulgaria
- Dates: March 28 – April 5
- Teams: 12
- Venues: 2 (in 2 host cities)

Final positions
- Champions: Russia (2nd title)

Tournament awards
- MVP: Angelina Lazarenko (RUS)

The 2015 Girls' Youth European Volleyball Championship was played in Samokov and Plovdiv, Bulgaria from March 28 to April 5, 2015. The top six teams qualified for the 2015 Youth World Championship.

== Participating teams ==
- Host
  - Bulgaria
- Qualified through 2015 Girls' Youth European Volleyball Championship Qualification
  - Belgium
  - Czech Republic
  - Germany
  - Greece
  - Italy
  - Netherlands
  - Poland
  - Russia
  - Serbia
  - Slovenia
  - Turkey

== Pool composition ==
| Pool I | Pool II |
|---|---|
| Serbia | Bulgaria |
| Russia | Belgium |
| Germany | Turkey |
| Italy | Netherlands |
| Slovenia | Poland |
| Greece | Czech Republic |

== Pool standing procedure ==
1. Match points
2. Numbers of matches won
3. Sets ratio
4. Points ratio
5. Result of the last match between the tied teams

Match won 3–0 or 3–1: 3 match points for the winner, 0 match points for the loser
Match won 3–2: 2 match points for the winner, 1 match point for the loser

== Preliminary round ==
- All times are Eastern European Summer Time (UTC+03:00) except 28 March is Eastern European Time (UTC+02:00).

=== Pool I ===
- venue: Arena Samokov, Samokov, Bulgaria

| Pos | Team | Pld | W | L | Pts | SW | SL | SR | SPW | SPL | SPR | Qualification |
|---|---|---|---|---|---|---|---|---|---|---|---|---|
| 1 | Serbia | 5 | 5 | 0 | 15 | 15 | 2 | 7.500 | 426 | 346 | 1.231 | Semifinals |
| 2 | Russia | 5 | 4 | 1 | 11 | 13 | 5 | 2.600 | 418 | 373 | 1.121 | Semifinals |
| 3 | Italy | 5 | 3 | 2 | 10 | 11 | 6 | 1.833 | 377 | 332 | 1.136 | 5th–8th classification |
| 4 | Germany | 5 | 2 | 3 | 6 | 6 | 10 | 0.600 | 346 | 363 | 0.953 | 5th–8th classification |
| 5 | Greece | 5 | 1 | 4 | 3 | 4 | 12 | 0.333 | 335 | 375 | 0.893 | |
| 6 | Slovenia | 5 | 0 | 5 | 0 | 1 | 15 | 0.067 | 285 | 398 | 0.716 | |

| Date | Time | | Score | | Set 1 | Set 2 | Set 3 | Set 4 | Set 5 | Total | Report |
|---|---|---|---|---|---|---|---|---|---|---|---|
| 28 Mar | 15:30 | Italy | 3–0 | Slovenia | 25–18 | 25–12 | 25–13 | | | 75–43 | Report |
| 28 Mar | 18:00 | Russia | 3–0 | Germany | 28–26 | 25–23 | 25–19 | | | 78–68 | Report |
| 28 Mar | 20:30 | Serbia | 3–0 | Greece | 25–21 | 29–27 | 25–19 | | | 79–67 | Report |
| 29 Mar | 15:30 | Germany | 3–0 | Slovenia | 25–17 | 25–18 | 25–21 | | | 75–56 | Report |
| 29 Mar | 18:00 | Russia | 1–3 | Serbia | 22–25 | 18–25 | 26–24 | 21–25 | | 87–99 | Report |
| 29 Mar | 20:30 | Greece | 0–3 | Italy | 16–25 | 22–25 | 19–25 | | | 57–75 | Report |
| 30 Mar | 15:30 | Serbia | 3–0 | Germany | 25–18 | 25–19 | 25–23 | | | 75–60 | Report |
| 30 Mar | 18:00 | Italy | 2–3 | Russia | 25–17 | 21–25 | 25–21 | 20–25 | 10–15 | 101–103 | Report |
| 30 Mar | 20:30 | Slovenia | 0–3 | Greece | 16–25 | 18–25 | 23–25 | | | 57–75 | Report |
| 1 Apr | 15:30 | Serbia | 3–0 | Italy | 25–18 | 25–17 | 25–16 | | | 75–51 | Report |
| 1 Apr | 18:00 | Russia | 3–0 | Slovenia | 25–14 | 25–16 | 25–18 | | | 75–48 | Report |
| 1 Apr | 20:30 | Germany | 3–1 | Greece | 14–25 | 25–19 | 25–23 | 25–12 | | 89–79 | Report |
| 2 Apr | 15:30 | Slovenia | 1–3 | Serbia | 25–23 | 18–25 | 18–25 | 20–25 | | 81–98 | Report |
| 2 Apr | 18:00 | Italy | 3–0 | Germany | 25–21 | 25–18 | 25–15 | | | 75–54 | Report |
| 2 Apr | 20:30 | Greece | 0–3 | Russia | 19–25 | 22–25 | 16–25 | | | 57–75 | Report |

=== Pool II ===
- venue: University Sport Hall Plovdiv, Plovdiv, Bulgaria

| Pos | Team | Pld | W | L | Pts | SW | SL | SR | SPW | SPL | SPR | Qualification |
|---|---|---|---|---|---|---|---|---|---|---|---|---|
| 1 | Turkey | 5 | 5 | 0 | 14 | 15 | 4 | 3.750 | 451 | 386 | 1.168 | Semifinals |
| 2 | Belgium | 5 | 4 | 1 | 11 | 13 | 7 | 1.857 | 462 | 395 | 1.170 | Semifinals |
| 3 | Poland | 5 | 3 | 2 | 10 | 12 | 8 | 1.500 | 456 | 438 | 1.041 | 5th–8th classification |
| 4 | Czech Republic | 5 | 2 | 3 | 6 | 9 | 11 | 0.818 | 412 | 403 | 1.022 | 5th–8th classification |
| 5 | Netherlands | 5 | 1 | 4 | 3 | 6 | 14 | 0.429 | 402 | 458 | 0.878 | |
| 6 | Bulgaria | 4 | 0 | 4 | 1 | 4 | 15 | 0.267 | 363 | 466 | 0.779 | |

| Date | Time | | Score | | Set 1 | Set 2 | Set 3 | Set 4 | Set 5 | Total | Report |
|---|---|---|---|---|---|---|---|---|---|---|---|
| 28 Mar | 15:00 | Poland | 2–3 | Turkey | 22–25 | 25–23 | 17–25 | 25–17 | 10–15 | 99–105 | Report |
| 28 Mar | 17:30 | Bulgaria | 0–3 | Czech Republic | 12–25 | 12–25 | 21–25 | | | 45–75 | Report |
| 28 Mar | 20:00 | Netherlands | 0–3 | Belgium | 22–25 | 12–25 | 23–25 | | | 57–75 | Report |
| 29 Mar | 15:00 | Czech Republic | 1–3 | Turkey | 25–16 | 15–25 | 22–25 | 15–25 | | 77–91 | Report |
| 29 Mar | 17:30 | Bulgaria | 2–3 | Netherlands | 23–25 | 25–21 | 27–25 | 18–25 | 12–15 | 105–111 | Repost |
| 29 Mar | 20:00 | Belgium | 3–1 | Poland | 22–25 | 25–18 | 25–16 | 25–22 | | 97–81 | Report |
| 30 Mar | 15:00 | Netherlands | 2–3 | Czech Republic | 12–25 | 25–20 | 25–15 | 12–25 | 11–15 | 85–100 | Report |
| 30 Mar | 17:30 | Poland | 3–1 | Bulgaria | 27–25 | 27–25 | 23–25 | 25–16 | | 102–91 | Report |
| 30 Mar | 20:00 | Turkey | 3–1 | Belgium | 25–21 | 21–25 | 25–18 | 25–21 | | 96–85 | Report |
| 1 Apr | 15:00 | Netherlands | 1–3 | Poland | 24–26 | 25–23 | 17–25 | 19–25 | | 85–99 | Report |
| 1 Apr | 17:30 | Bulgaria | 0–3 | Turkey | 14–25 | 19–25 | 28–30 | | | 61–80 | Report |
| 1 Apr | 20:00 | Czech Republic | 2–3 | Belgium | 25–19 | 25–23 | 23–25 | 19–25 | 8–15 | 100–107 | Report |
| 2 Apr | 15:00 | Turkey | 3–0 | Netherlands | 29–27 | 25–18 | 25–19 | | | 79–64 | Report |
| 2 Apr | 17:30 | Poland | 3–0 | Czech Republic | 25–23 | 25–22 | 25–15 | | | 75–60 | Report |
| 2 Apr | 20:00 | Belgium | 3–1 | Bulgaria | 25–17 | 25–12 | 23–25 | 25–7 | | 98–61 | Report |

== Final round ==
- All times are Eastern European Summer Time (UTC+03:00).
- venue: University Sport Hall Plovdiv, Plovdiv, Bulgaria

=== 5th–8th place ===
5th–8th semifinals
4 April
Italy | 3
Czech Republic | 1
4 April
Poland | 0
Germany | 3

5th place match
5 April
Italy | 3
Germany | 1
7th place match
5 April
Czech Republic | 3
Poland | 0

==== 5th–8th place playoff ====
| Date | Time | | Score | | Set 1 | Set 2 | Set 3 | Set 4 | Set 5 | Total | Report |
|---|---|---|---|---|---|---|---|---|---|---|---|
| 4 Apr | 11:00 | Italy | 3–1 | Czech Republic | 20–25 | 25–23 | 25–16 | 25–18 | | 95–82 | Report |
| 4 Apr | 13:30 | Poland | 0–3 | Germany | 17–25 | 12–25 | 15–25 | | | 44–75 | Report |

==== 7th place ====
| Date | Time | | Score | | Set 1 | Set 2 | Set 3 | Set 4 | Set 5 | Total | Report |
|---|---|---|---|---|---|---|---|---|---|---|---|
| 5 Apr | 11:00 | Czech Republic | 3–0 | Poland | 25–18 | 25–17 | 25–22 | | | 75–57 | Report |

==== 5th place ====
| Date | Time | | Score | | Set 1 | Set 2 | Set 3 | Set 4 | Set 5 | Total | Report |
|---|---|---|---|---|---|---|---|---|---|---|---|
| 5 Apr | 13:30 | Italy | 3–1 | Germany | 25–12 | 21–25 | 25–21 | 25–14 | | 96–72 | Report |

=== Championship round ===
Semifinals
4 April
Serbia | 3
Belgium | 1
4 April
Turkey | 1
Russia | 3

Final
5 April
Serbia | 2
Russia | 3
3rd place
5 April
Belgium | 3
Turkey | 0

==== Semifinal ====
| Date | Time | | Score | | Set 1 | Set 2 | Set 3 | Set 4 | Set 5 | Total | Report |
|---|---|---|---|---|---|---|---|---|---|---|---|
| 4 Apr | 16:00 | Serbia | 3–1 | Belgium | 25–22 | 17–25 | 25–17 | 25–22 | | 92–86 | Report |
| 4 Apr | 19:00 | Turkey | 1–3 | Russia | 23–25 | 24–26 | 25–16 | 24–26 | | 96–93 | Report |

==== 3rd place ====
| Date | Time | | Score | | Set 1 | Set 2 | Set 3 | Set 4 | Set 5 | Total | Report |
|---|---|---|---|---|---|---|---|---|---|---|---|
| 5 Apr | 16:00 | Belgium | 3–0 | Turkey | 25–16 | 25–16 | 25–23 | | | 75–55 | Report |

==== Final ====
| Date | Time | | Score | | Set 1 | Set 2 | Set 3 | Set 4 | Set 5 | Total | Report |
|---|---|---|---|---|---|---|---|---|---|---|---|
| 5 Apr | 19:00 | Serbia | 2–3 | Russia | 25–16 | 21–25 | 22–25 | 25–23 | 7–15 | 100–104 | Report |

== Final standing ==
| Rank | Team |
|---|---|
| 1st place, gold medalist(s) | Russia |
| 2nd place, silver medalist(s) | Serbia |
| 3rd place, bronze medalist(s) | Belgium |
| 4 | Turkey |
| 5 | Italy |
| 6 | Germany |
| 7 | Czech Republic |
| 8 | Poland |
| 9 | Netherlands |
| 10 | Greece |
| 11 | Bulgaria |
| 12 | Slovenia |

| Qualified for the 2015 Youth World Championship |

2015 Youth European champions

Russia
2nd title

12–woman roster
Angelina Lazarenko, Ksenia Smirnova, Inna Balyko, Anastasia Stalnaya, Elizaveta Kotova, Anastasia Maksimova, Ksenia Pligunova, Angelina Emelina, Daria Ryseva, Olesya Ivanova, Maria Vorobyeva, Aleksandra Oganezova
Head coach
Svetlana Safronova

== Awards ==
- Most valuable player
  (Russia) Angelina Lazarenko (RUS)
- Best setter
  (Italy) Alessia Orro (ITA)
- Best outside spikers
  (Turkey) Tutku Burcu Yüzgenç (TUR)
  (Serbia) Katarina Lazovic (SER)
- Best middle blockers
  (Russia) Angelina Lazarenko (RUS)
  (Russia) Elizaveta Kotova (RUS)
- Best opposite spiker
  (Belgium) Britt Herbots (BEL)
- Best libero
  (Serbia) Tijana Milojevic (SER)

== See also ==
- 2015 Boys' Youth European Volleyball Championship
