= Mühlacker =

Town in Baden-Württemberg, Germany

- Town
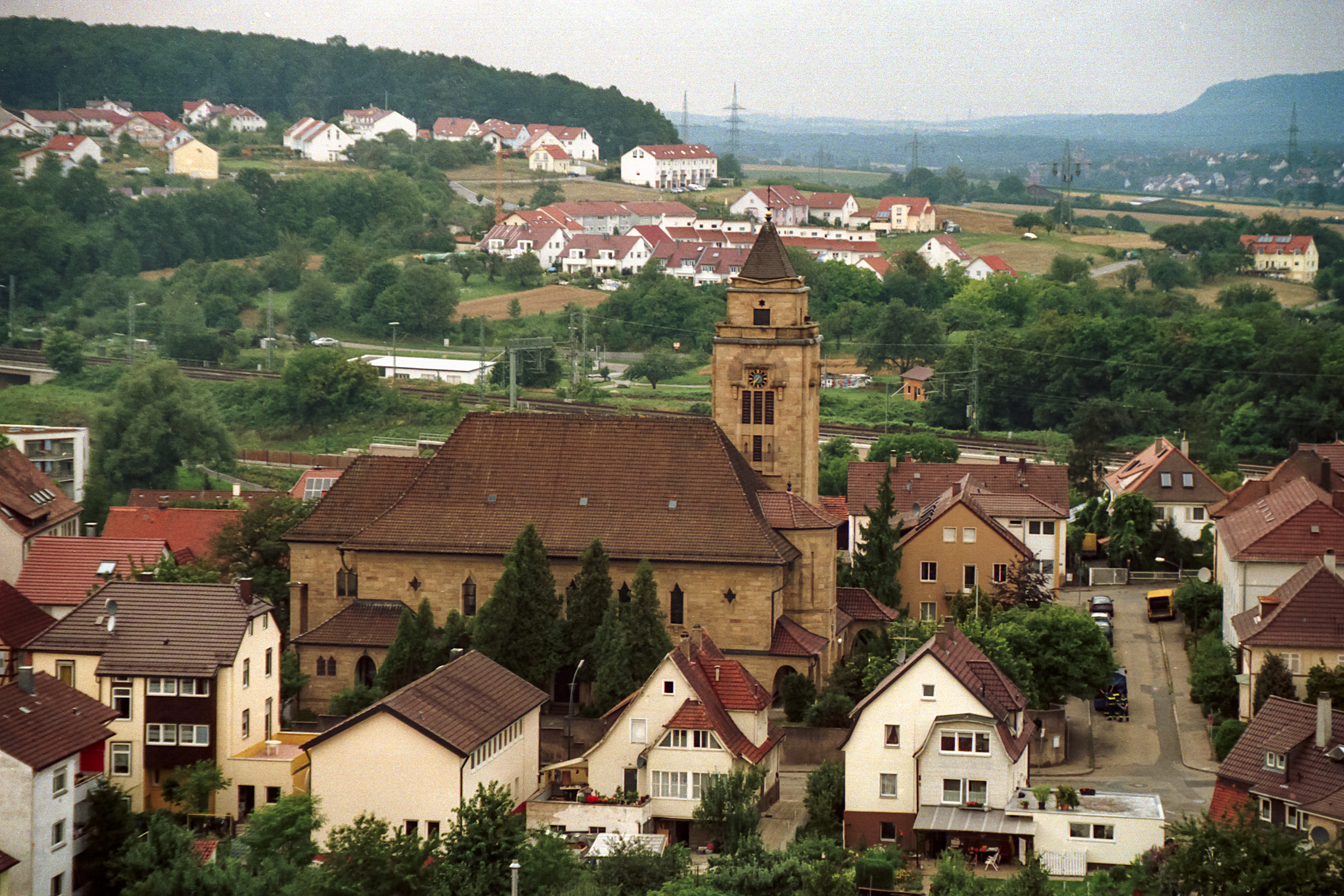

- Coat of arms

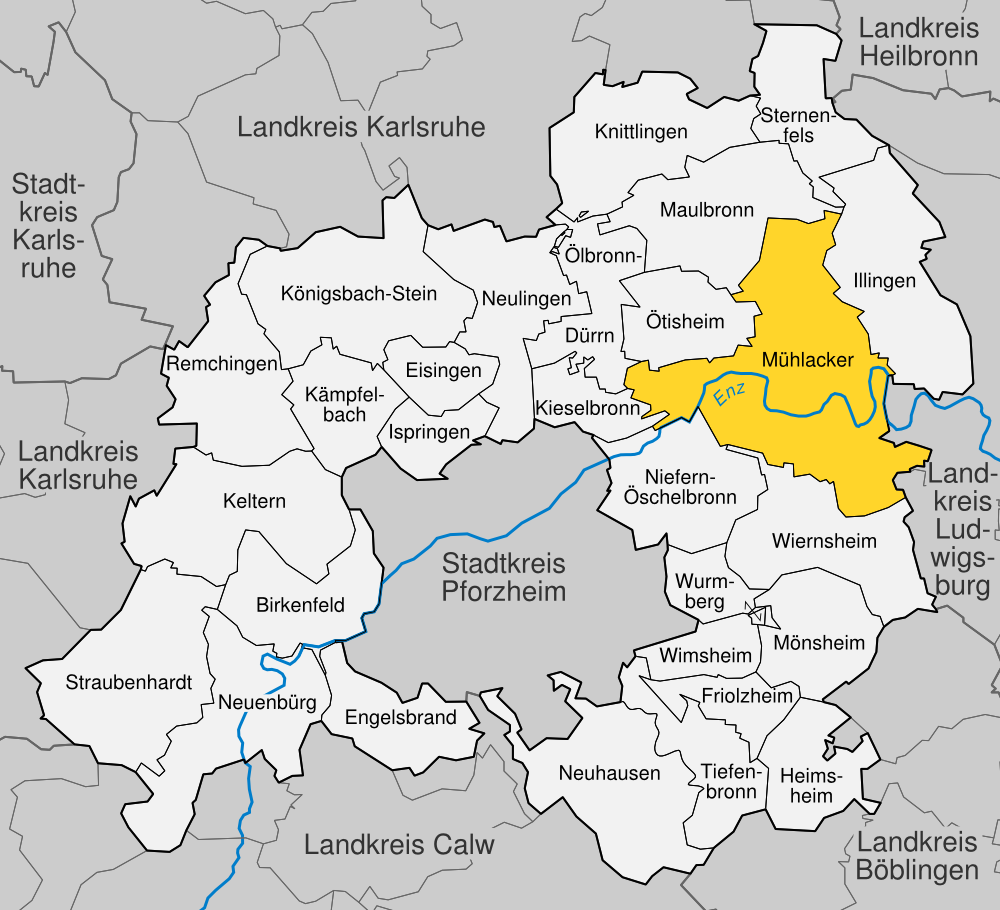
- Location of Mühlacker within Enzkreis district
- Interactive map of Mühlacker
- Location within Germany Location within Baden-Württemberg
- Coordinates: 48°57′0″N 8°50′22″E
- Country: Germany
- State: Baden-Württemberg
- Admin. region: Karlsruhe
- District: Enzkreis
- Subdivisions: 6

Government
  - Mayor (2025–2033): Stephan Retter (Ind.)

Area
  - Total: 54.32 km^{2} (20.97 sq mi)
- Elevation: 240 m (790 ft)

Population (2025-12-31)
  - Total: 26,793
  - Density: 493.2/km^{2} (1,277/sq mi)
- Time zone: UTC+01:00 (CET)
  - Summer (DST): UTC+02:00 (CEST)
- Postal codes: 75401–75417
- Dialling codes: 07041
- Vehicle registration: PF
- Website: www.muehlacker.de

Mühlacker (German pronunciation: [ˈmyːlˌʔakɐ]) is a town in the eastern part of the Enz district of Baden-Württemberg, Germany. Mühlacker station has direct rail connections with Stuttgart, Karlsruhe, Heidelberg, and Pforzheim.

== Geography ==
Located in the northern Black Forest, the river Enz runs through Mühlacker. Both the northern and southern areas are characterised by mountain slopes, which are steeper in the northside.

Mühlacker is made up of six subdivisions: Mühlacker, Enzberg, Großglattbach, Lienzingen, Lomersheim and Mühlhausen an der Enz. The core city Mühlacker, consisting of the quarters of Mühlacker and Dürrmenz, is the most populous, with around 15,000 people. The least populated area is Mühlhausen, which maintains under 1,000 residents.

== History ==
The area of Mühlacker was inhabited by agricultural settlers since the Neolithic era. These included the Celts during the Bronze and Iron Age, as well as the Romans and Alemanni during ancient Rome.

The first named settlement in the area was Dürrmenz, spelled as Turmenz and dated to 779 in the Lorsch codex. Mühlacker was recorded as a hamlet in 1292.

By 1482, the ruling, impoverished Lords of Dürrmenz had sold all of their property to the Maulbronn Monastery. When the monastery went to Ulrich, Duke of Württemberg in 1504, Dürrmenz and its hamlets, including Mühlacker, were made part of the Duchy of Württemberg.

=== Thirty Years' War ===
The Thirty Years' War brought hardship and misery. In 1648, only 11 inhabitants remained from originally 1242 inhabitants (1622). In the Nine Years' War (1688–1697), after the Battle of Ötisheim, Dürrmenz was looted in 1692 by French troops. To defend against future attacks, the Eppingen lines were erected. To make up for the population loss, the duke of Württemberg allowed French Huguenot refugees to settle in the duchy, including 500 in the Welschdorf of Dürrmenz. Eckenweiher was incorporated to Dürrmenz in 1832.

=== Industrialisation ===
With the opening of the Württemberg Western Railway Stuttgart - Bruchsal in 1853 the industrial age began in the Dürrmenz-Mühlacker area. As the Karlsruhe-Mühlacker railway was built in 1863, Mühlacker was at the same railway junction and border station. As a curiosity, until 1930 it had two stations side by side, the larger Württemberg station and the Baden railway station. Favored by the dismantling of custom barriers 1819-1851 and the abolition of the compulsory guild (1862), industrial enterprises settled near the train station.

=== 20th century ===
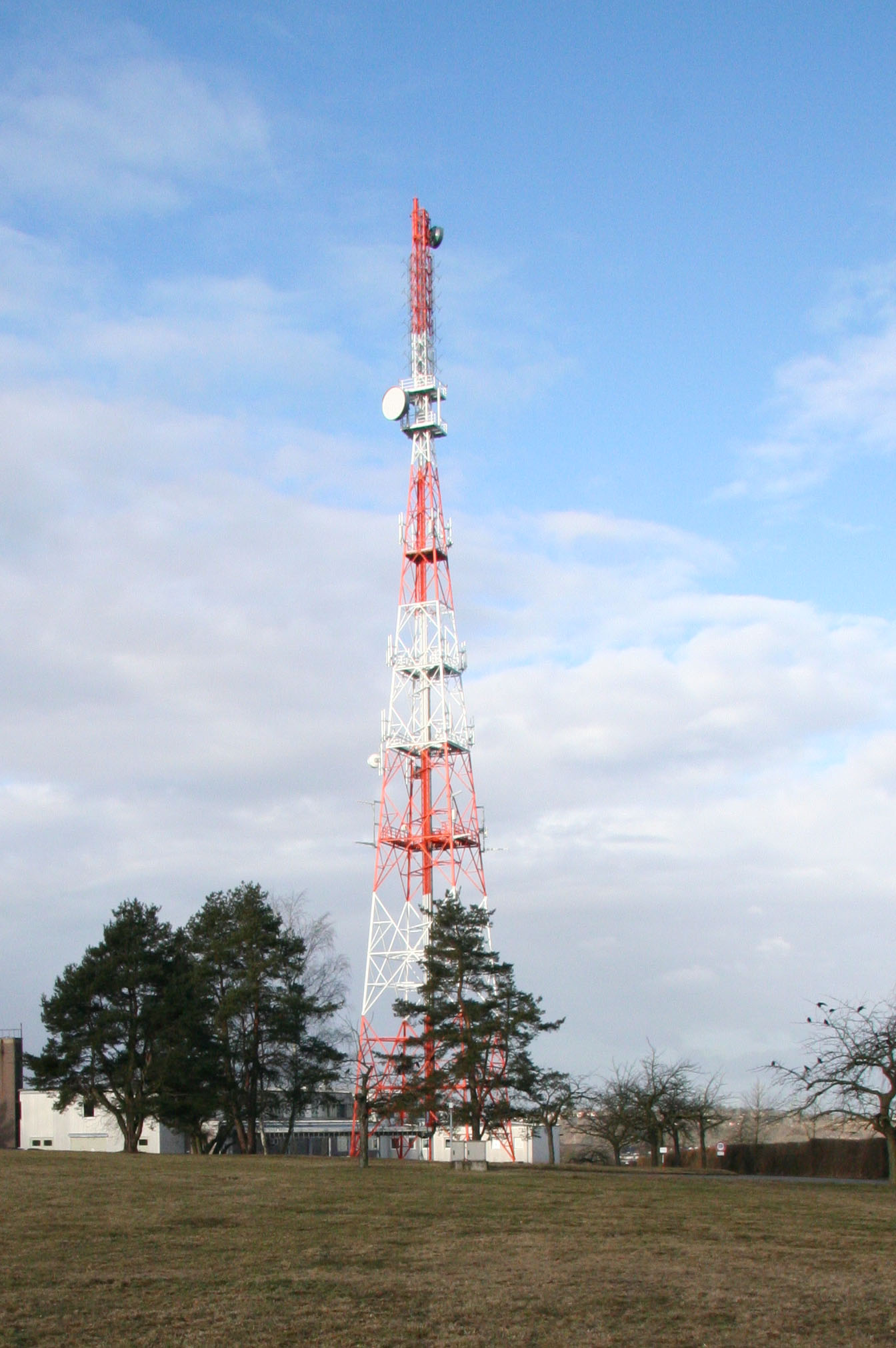
Radio transmitter

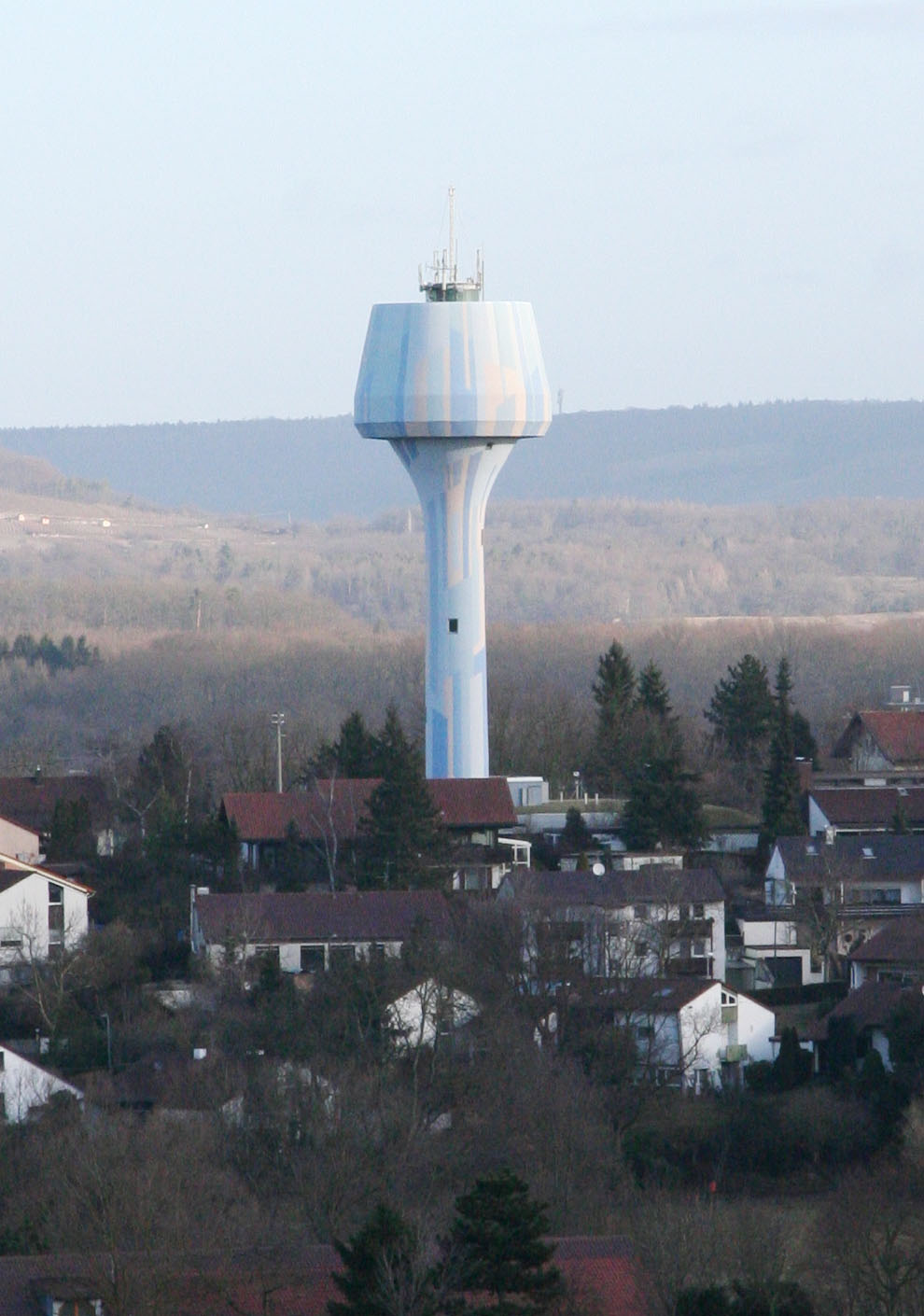
Water tower

After World War I, inflation, Great Depression and high unemployment interrupted the further development. In 1930, the municipality of Dürrmenz-Mühlacker became the city of Mühlacker. That same year, the large Mühlacker radio transmitter was put into operation, earning Mühlacker the byname "Senderstadt" ("Transmission City"). Upon request by city officials in 2022, the name became an official title in September 2023. Lienzingen's historical inner town also became recognised as Etterdorf.

With the dissolution of Oberamt Maulbronn, young city Mühlacker in 1938 was incorporated into district Vaihingen. During the Nazi period, eight Jewish citizens of Mühlacker were deported to Auschwitz, including three who had fled to Le Mans in France. Seven were murdered at the camp while the eighth, Theodor Slepoj, survived to see the liberation of Auschwitz, but died days later of his previous mistreatment. Commemorative Stolpersteine for the Holocaust victims were paved into Mühlacker's streets in 2009.

The World War II ended in Mühlacker with destruction by air raids and artillery shelling. After 1945, 3000 refugees and displaced persons found settled in Mühlacker.

Enzberg and Mühlhausen an der Enz became part of Mühlacker in 1972. As part of the district reform on 1 January 1973, the district Vaihingen was dissolved. The western region, with the town of Mühlacker became part of the newly formed Enzkreis. The eastern part of the district Vaihingen was incorporated into the district of Ludwigsburg. The community of Ötisheim joined onto the city as a Vereinbarte Verwaltungsgemeinschaft so as to act as a single municipality for certain tasks. Mühlacker also acts as a Mittelzentrum to Ötisheim, Maulbronn, Illingen, Knittlingen und Sternenfels.

== Culture ==
Mühlacker is regarded as a winemaking area, which was cultivated in the 16th-century as part of crop contributions to the Maulbronn Monastery as tithe. However, wine-growing was disrupted by the Year without a Summer following the 1815 eruption of Mount Tambora in the Dutch East Indies, forcing farmers to switch to growing hops for beer. The annual Mühlacker wine festival takes place to celebrate the wine culture since the 1980s.

== Climate ==
Climate data for Mühlacker (1991–2020 normals)
| Month | Jan | Feb | Mar | Apr | May | Jun | Jul | Aug | Sep | Oct | Nov | Dec | Year |
|---|---|---|---|---|---|---|---|---|---|---|---|---|---|
| Mean daily maximum °C (°F) | 5.1 (41.2) | 6.7 (44.1) | 11.6 (52.9) | 16.8 (62.2) | 20.3 (68.5) | 24.2 (75.6) | 26.3 (79.3) | 25.5 (77.9) | 21.2 (70.2) | 15.9 (60.6) | 9.7 (49.5) | 6.0 (42.8) | 15.8 (60.4) |
| Daily mean °C (°F) | 1.3 (34.3) | 2.1 (35.8) | 5.6 (42.1) | 9.7 (49.5) | 13.6 (56.5) | 17.4 (63.3) | 19.2 (66.6) | 18.4 (65.1) | 14.2 (57.6) | 9.9 (49.8) | 5.4 (41.7) | 2.2 (36.0) | 10.0 (50.0) |
| Mean daily minimum °C (°F) | −2.6 (27.3) | −2.8 (27.0) | −0.3 (31.5) | 2.2 (36.0) | 6.5 (43.7) | 10.5 (50.9) | 12.1 (53.8) | 11.8 (53.2) | 8.0 (46.4) | 4.8 (40.6) | 1.2 (34.2) | −1.3 (29.7) | 4.3 (39.7) |
| Average precipitation mm (inches) | 55.0 (2.17) | 45.3 (1.78) | 46.3 (1.82) | 38.1 (1.50) | 78.9 (3.11) | 56.9 (2.24) | 77.1 (3.04) | 79.9 (3.15) | 51.6 (2.03) | 66.4 (2.61) | 55.6 (2.19) | 61.6 (2.43) | 699.8 (27.55) |
| Average precipitation days (≥ 1.0 mm) | 17.6 | 14.8 | 14.1 | 11.3 | 15.3 | 13.5 | 14.2 | 14.1 | 11.2 | 13.9 | 14.5 | 18.8 | 172.9 |
| Average relative humidity (%) | 86.4 | 82.1 | 76.2 | 71.7 | 74.2 | 74.8 | 71.5 | 76.9 | 80.2 | 86.8 | 88.3 | 88.7 | 79.8 |
| Mean monthly sunshine hours | 64.0 | 87.5 | 146.8 | 204.7 | 217.7 | 243.1 | 254.6 | 228.2 | 182.8 | 118.5 | 71.5 | 53.6 | 1,867.5 |
Source: World Meteorological Organization

== Sights ==
Since 1930, Mühlacker has been transmitter site, at which between 1934 and 1945 the tallest tower ever built of wood stood (height: 190 metres). The water tower, built in 1972, stands at 42 metres and is traditionally lit up as a decorative light during Christmas season.

Burg Dürrmenz, a hill castle, was constructed in the 13th century by the Lords of Dürrmenz. Following repeated destructions and reconstructions, the castle was left as what are now known as the Löffelstelz ruins.

== Twin towns – sister cities ==
Mühlacker is twinned with:

- Bassano del Grappa, Italy
- Schmölln, Germany

== Notable people ==
- Ulrich I of Dürrmenz, (died 1163), Reich Chancellor under Holy Roman Emperor Barbarossa and Bishop of Speyer
- Anna Catharina Wedderkopf (1715–1786), businesswoman, consultant and feminist
- Hellmut G. Haasis (born 1942), writer and historian
- Verena Veh (born 1977), volleyball player
- Florian Naroska (born 1982), water polo player
- Kim Kurniawan (born 1990), Indonesian footballer
