= Stephanie Hagen =

American volleyball player

Personal information
- Full name: Stephanie Hagen Chapek
- Nationality: American
- Born: August 26, 1979 (age 47)
- Hometown: Minnetonka, Minnesota
- Height: 1.91 m (6 ft 3 in)
- Weight: 78 kg (172 lb)
- Spike: 308 cm (121 in)
- Block: 301 cm (119 in)
- Education: University of Minnesota

Volleyball information
- Position: Middle Blocker

National team
2002	United States

Stephanie Hagen (born August 26, 1979) is a retired American indoor volleyball player.

She played for the United States women's national volleyball team, at the 2002 FIVB World Grand Prix.

== Background ==
She was an All-American for University of Minnesota.

In 2008, she played beach volleyball with Erin Byrd.
