= Alessandra Fratoni =

Brazilian volleyball player (born 1981)

Personal information
- Full name: Alessandra Teixeira Lima Fratoni
- Nationality: Brazilian
- Born: 30 December 1981 (age 44)
- Hometown: Rio de Janeiro, Brazil
- Height: 1.81 m (5 ft 11 in)
- Weight: 73 kg (161 lb)
- Spike: 305 cm (120 in)
- Block: 299 cm (118 in)

Volleyball information
- Position: Middle-blocker
- Current club: Sao Caetano E.C.
- Number: 12 (national team)

National team
1999-2002	Brazil

Alessandra Fratoni (born 30 December 1981) is a Brazilian volleyball player, who played as a middle blocker.

She was part of the Brazil women's national volleyball team at the 2002 FIVB Volleyball Women's World Championship in Germany.

On club level she played with Sao Caetano E.C. and VK Baku at the 2012 CEV Women's Challenge Cup.

== Clubs ==
Club	From	To
Brazil Esporte Clube Pinheiros	1998-1999	1999-2000
Brazil São Caetano	2000-2001	2001-2002
Brazil Sociedade Esportiva Bandeirante	2002-2003	2002-2003
Italy Volley Airone Tortolì	2003-2004	2003-2004
Italy Volley Club Padova	2004-2005	2004-2005
Italy Pallavolo Civitanova Marche	2005-2006	2005-2006
Italy New Team Volley Castelfidardo	2006-2007	2006-2007
Italy Volley Club Milano	2007-2008	2007-2008
Italy Pallavolo Volta	2008-2009	2008-2009
Italy Verona Volley	2009-2010	2009-2010
Italy Crema Volley	2010-2011	2010-2011
Azerbaijan VC Baku	2011-2012	2011-2012
