= Ekaterina Yosifova =

Bulgarian journalist and poet (1941–2022)

Ekaterina Petrova Yosifova
- Екатерина Петрова Йосифова
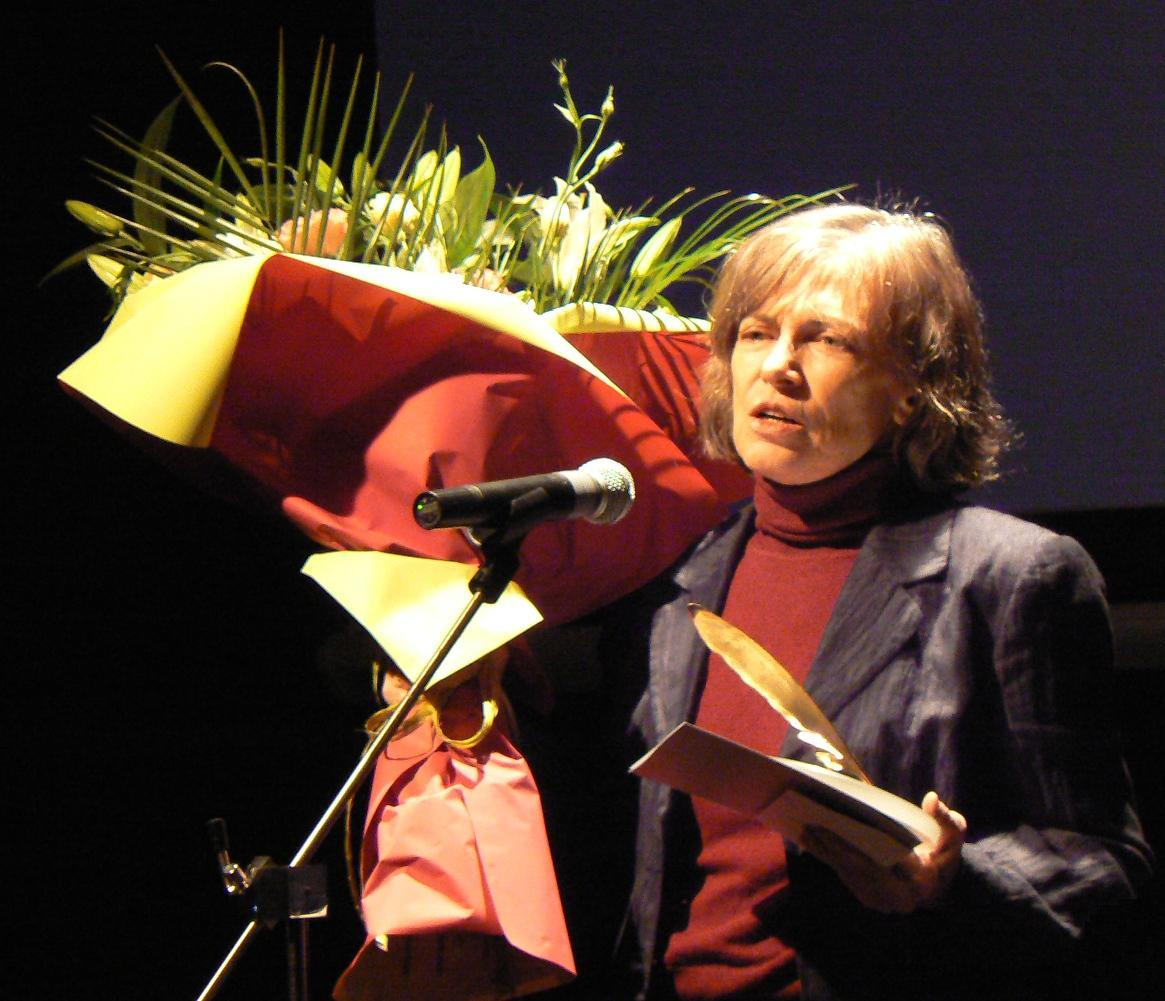
- Yosifova receives the Ivan Nikolov award in 2010
- Born: 4 June 1941; Kyustendil, Kingdom of Bulgaria
- Died: 13 August 2022 (aged 81)
- Education: University of Sofia
- Writing career
- Genres: Poetry, journalism

Ekaterina Petrova Yosifova (Bulgarian: Екатерина Петрова Йосифова; 4 June 1941 – 13 August 2022) was a Bulgarian educator, journalist and poet.

== Life ==
Yosifova was born in Kyustendil and studied Russian language at the University of Sofia. Yosifova was employed as a high school teacher in Kyustendil and then later as a newspaper editor.

She published Kuso putuvane ('Brief Journey') in 1969 and Noshtem ide vyatur ('The Wind Comes at Night') in 1972. Yosifova became editor-in-chief for Struma, a literary magazine.

== Awards ==
Yosifova received the Ivan Nikolov Award.

== Works ==
- 1969 – Kuso patuvane ('Short Travel')
- 1972 – Noshtem ide vyatar (The Wind Comes at Night')
- 1978 – Posveshtenie ('Dedication')
- 1983 – Kushta v poleto ('House in the Field')
- 1987 – Imena ('Names')
- 1993 – Podozrenia ('Suspicions')
- 1994 – Nenuzhno povedenie ('Useless Conduct')
- 1998 – Malko stihotvorenia ('Few Poems')
- 2001 – Nishto novo (100 stihotvorenia) ('Nothing New: 100 Poems')
- 2004 – Nagore nadolu ('Up and Down')
- 2006 – Ratse ('Hands')
- 2010 – Tazi zmiya ('This Snake')
- 2014 – Tunka knizhka ('Slim Booklet')

=== Works translated to English ===
Her work, translated into English, has appeared in the anthologies:

- Windows on the Black Sea (1992)
- Clay and Star (1992)
- The Manyvoiced Wave: Contemporary Women Poets of Bulgaria, Translators Tsvetelina Ganeva; Richard Scorza, Samkaleen Prakashan, 1999, ISBN 9788170831532
- An Anthology of Contemporary Poetry (1994)
