= Candace McNamee =

American volleyball player (born 1980)

Candace Novoselnik

Personal information
- Nationality: American
- Born: Candace McNamee; June 13, 1980 (age 46); Washington, D.C.
- Height: 1.80 m (5 ft 11 in)
- Weight: 66 kg (146 lb)
- Spike: 300 cm (118 in)
- Block: 296 cm (117 in)
- Education: University of California

Career
| Years | Teams |
|---|---|
| 1998-2001 | University of California, Berkeley |

National team
| 2002 | United States |

Candace Novoselnik (née McNamee; born June 13, 1980) is an American former indoor volleyball player.

She played for the United States women's national volleyball team, at the 2002 FIVB World Grand Prix.

== Life ==
She played for Sidwell Friends. She played for University of California, Berkeley. In 2013, she was assistant coach at University of Ljubljana.

== Clubs ==
| Club | Country | From | To |
|---|---|---|---|
| Voley Murcia | Spain | 2003–2004 | 2004–2005 |
| Las Palmas | Spain | 2005-2006 | 2005-2006 |
| Schweriner SC | Germany | 2006-2007 | 2006-2007 |
| ES Le Cannet-Rocheville | France | 2009-2010 | 2009-2010 |
| Istres OPVB | France | 2010-2011 | 2010-2011 |
| Tiboni Urbino | Italy | 2011-2012 | ... |
