= Cheryl Weaver =

Indoor volleyball player (born 1980)

Personal information
- Nationality: American
- Born: March 22, 1980 (age 46)
- Hometown: Washington, D.C.
- Height: 1.88 m (6 ft 2 in)
- Weight: 84 kg (185 lb)
- Spike: 310 cm (122 in)
- Block: 302 cm (119 in)
- Education: Long Beach State University

Career
Years	Teams
1998-2001	Long Beach State University

National team
2002-2010	United States

Cheryl Weaver (born March 22, 1980) is an American former indoor volleyball player.

She played for the United States women's national volleyball team, at the 2002 FIVB World Grand Prix.

== Life ==
She played for Long Beach State University.

== Clubs ==
Club	Years
Voléro Zürich	2006/2007
Azerrail Baku	2011
