= Angelina Lazareva =

Russian volleyball player

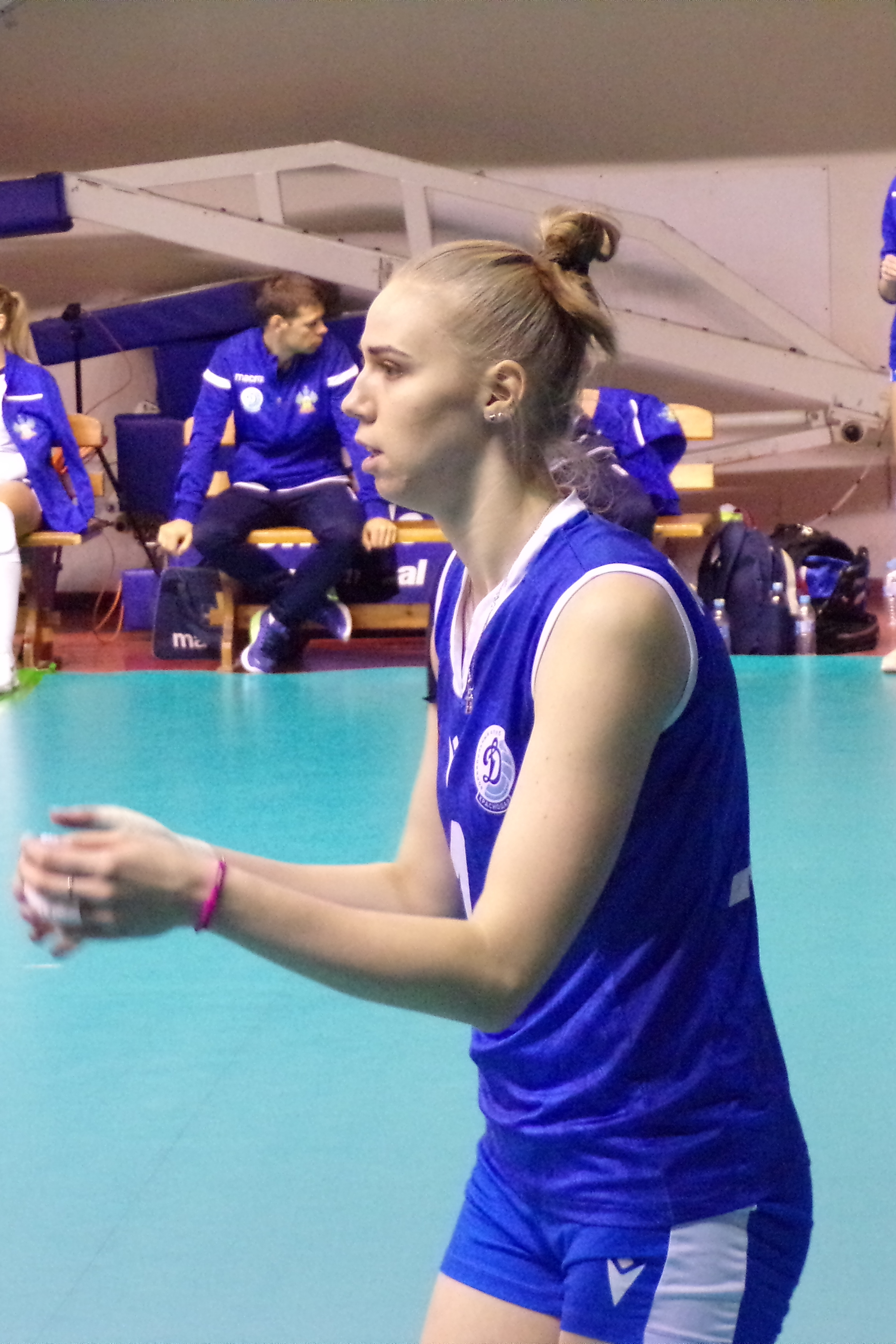

Personal information
- Nationality: Russian
- Born: April 13, 1998 (age 28); Saratov, Russia
- Height: 193 cm (6 ft 4 in)
- Weight: 80 kg (176 lb)
- Spike: 320 cm (126 in)
- Block: 305 cm (120 in)

Volleyball information
- Position: Middle blocker
- Current club: (Russia) Dinamo Krasnodar

Career
Years	Teams
2015 - 2017; 2017 - 2018; 2018 - 2019; 2019 -	(Russia) Zarechye Odintsovo (Switzerland) Volero Zürich (France) Volero Le Cannet (Russia) Dinamo Krasnodar

National team
Russia

Angelina Vadimovna Lazareva (Lazarenko) (Russian: Ангели́на Вади́мовна Лазарева (Лазаре́нко), IPA: [ɐnɡʲɪˈlʲinə vɐˈdʲiməvnə ləzɐˈrʲenkə]; born 13 April 1998) is a Russian volleyball player, a member of the Russia women's national volleyball team. Since the 2019/2020 season, she has played for Dinamo Krasnodar.

== Sporting achievements ==
=== Clubs ===
Swiss SuperCup:

- 2017

Swiss Cup:

- 2018

Swiss Championship:

- 2018

=== National team ===
Youth European Championship:

- 2015

Junior European Championship:

- 2016

U20 World Championship:

- 2017

Summer Universiade:

- 2017

=== Individual ===
- 2015: MVP and the best middle blocker Youth European Championship
- 2016: The best middle blocker Junior European Championship
