= Nina Puikkonen =

American volleyball player

Personal information
- Full name: Nina Puikkonen Mortensen
- Nationality: American
- Born: August 3, 1979 (age 47)
- Hometown: Murray, Utah
- Height: 1.91 m (6 ft 3 in)
- Weight: 78 kg (172 lb)
- Spike: 306 cm (120 in)
- Block: 298 cm (117 in)
- Education: Brigham Young University

Volleyball information
- Position: middle blocker

Career
Years	Teams
1997–2000; 2002	Brigham Young University; Chicago Thunder, Tarmo-Volley

National team
2002	United States

Nina Puikkonen Mortensen (born August 3, 1979) is a former American indoor volleyball player.

She played for the United States women's national volleyball team, at the 2002 FIVB World Grand Prix.

== Life ==
Puikkonen is a three-time All-American for Brigham Young University. She played for the Chicago Thunder, and Tarmo-Volley. In 2013, she was an assistant coach at Utah Valley State College.
