= Verena Veh =

German volleyball player (born 1977)

Personal information
- Nationality: German
- Born: 4 November 1977 (age 48) Mühlacker, West Germany
Honours
Women's volleyball
Representing Germany
European Championship
Bronze medal – third place	2003 Ankara	Team competition

Verena Veh (born 4 November 1977) is a retired German volleyball player.

She played at the 2002 FIVB Volleyball Women's World Championship in Germany. On club level she played with SSV Blautal Center Ulm.
