= Elena Konstantinova =

Russian volleyball player (born 1981)

Personal information
- Full name: Elena Konstantinova Murtazaeva
- Nationality: Russian
- Born: Elena Konstantinova; 25 August 1981 (age 45)
- Height: 1.90 m (6 ft 3 in)
- Weight: 74 kg (163 lb)
- Spike: 310 cm (122 in)
- Block: 304 cm (120 in)

Volleyball information
- Current club: CSKA
- Number: 13 (national team)

National team
| 2002 | Russia |

Elena Konstantinova Murtazaeva (born 25 August 1981) is a Russian volleyball player.

She was part of the Russia women's national volleyball team at the 2002 FIVB Volleyball Women's World Championship in Germany.

On club level she played with CSKA.

== Clubs ==
| Club | From | To |
|---|---|---|
| Russia CSKA Moscow | 1995-1996 | 2003-2004 |
| Russia Dinamo Moscow | 2005-2006 | 2005-2006 |
| Russia CSKA Moscow | 2006-2007 | 2007-2008 |
| Russia Dynamo-Yantar | 2008-2009 | 2009-2010 |
| Russia Dinamo Krasnodar | 2010-2011 | 2011-2012 |
| Russia Zaretchie Odintsovo | 2012-2013 | 2013-2014 |
