= Anjela Gourieva =

Russian volleyball player

Personal information
- Nationality: Russian
- Born: 2 September 1980 (age 46)
- Height: 1.95 m (6 ft 5 in)

Volleyball information
- Position: Middle blocker
- Current club: VK Uralotschka-NTMK
- Number: 15 (national team)

National team
2001–2002	Russia
Honours
Women's volleyball
Representing Russia
World Championship
Bronze medal – third place	2002 Germany	Team

Anschela Gurijeva or Anjela Gourieva (born 2 September 1980) is a retired Russian female volleyball player, who played as a middle blocker.

Gourieva was part of the Russia women's national volleyball team at the 2002 FIVB Volleyball Women's World Championship that won the bronze medal in Germany. On club level she played with VK Uralotschka-NTMK.

== Clubs ==
- VK Uralotschka-NTMK (2002)
