= Anna Artamonova =

Russian volleyball player (born 1980)

Personal information
- Nationality: Russian
- Born: 27 September 1980 (age 46)
- Height: 188 cm (74 in)
- Weight: 70 kg (154 lb)
- Spike: 306 cm (120 in)
- Block: 296 cm (117 in)

Volleyball information
- Number: 8 (national team)

Career
Years	Teams
2006	Zareche

National team
1997-2006	Russia

Anna Artamonova (born 27 September 1980) is a Russian female volleyball player. She was part of the Russia women's national volleyball team.

She participated in the 2006 FIVB Volleyball World Grand Prix. On club level she played for Zareche in 2006.
