= Tatiana Gorchkova =

Russian volleyball player

Personal information
- Nationality: Russian
- Born: 8 March 1981 (age 45)
- Height: 1.98 m (6 ft 6 in)

Volleyball information
- Position: Outside hitter
- Number: 1 (national team)

National team
2002-2004	Russia
Honours
Women's volleyball
Representing Russia
World Championship
Bronze medal – third place	2002 Germany	Team

Tatjana Gorschkova (born 8 March 1981) is a retired Russian female volleyball player, who played as an outside hitter.

Gorschkova was part of the Russia women's national volleyball team at the 2002 FIVB Volleyball Women's World Championship in Germany, and at the 2004 FIVB World Grand Prix. On club level she played with VK Uralotschka-NTMK.

== Clubs ==
- VK Uralotschka-NTMK (2002)
