= 2026 AVC Girls' U18 Volleyball Championship =

Youth volleyball championship in Thailand

Tournament details
- Host country: Thailand
- City: Nakhon Ratchasima
- Dates: 1–7 July
- Teams: 16 (from 1 confederation)
- Venue: 2 (in 1 host city)

Final positions
- Champions: China (6th title)
- Runners-up: South Korea
- Third place: Thailand
- Fourth place: Japan

Tournament awards
- MVP: (China) Xuan Yachen
- Best Setter: (China) Xuan Yachen
- Best OH: (China) Ren Sichen; (Thailand) Natchaya Ta-Hae
- Best MB: (China) Si Jingyu; (South Korea) Park Seo-yoon
- Best OPP: (China) Zhang Yijia
- Best Libero: (South Korea) Cho Li-bin

Tournament statistics
- Matches played: 48

The 2026 AVC Girls' U18 Volleyball Championship was the 16th edition of the Asian Women's U18 Volleyball Championship, a biennial international volleyball tournament organised by the Asian Volleyball Confederation (AVC) with Thailand Volleyball Association (TVA). The tournament is currently taking place in Nakhon Ratchasima, Thailand from 1 to 7 July.

Thailand was given the hosting rights, with Nakhon Ratchasima as the host city. This will be Thailand's ninth time hosting and second time the city hosts the event.

This tournament served as the qualification tournament for the FIVB Volleyball Girls' U19 World Championship. The top four teams of the tournament qualified for the 2027 FIVB Volleyball Girls' U19 World Championship as the AVC representatives.

Players must be born on or after January 1, 2009. Asia U18 players who have already played once in the FIVB U19 Championship cannot play in AVC U18 Championship as it is a qualification event for the following year of FIVB U19 event. In principle, the players can participate in Asian U18 and FIVB U19 only once.

China are the defending champions after beating Japan 3–0 at the final in Nakhon Pathom.

== Host selection ==
AVC awarded Thailand the hosting rights of the 16th edition of Asian Women's U18 Volleyball Championship. This will be Thailand's ninth time hosting after 1997, 2001, 2003, 2007, 2014, 2018, 2022 and 2024. This will be the second time Nakhon Ratchasima hosts the event after 2014.

== Pools composition ==
The draw of lots was released on 23 May 2026 on Asian Volleyball Confederation YouTube channel. Teams were split into four pools with four teams each.

Pool A	Pool B	Pool C	Pool D
Thailand	China	Japan	Chinese Taipei
Uzbekistan	Kazakhstan	Iran	South Korea
Australia	Hong Kong	Philippines	India
Mongolia	Kyrgyzstan	Indonesia	Vietnam

== Pool standing procedure ==
1. Total number of victories (matches won, matches lost)
2. In the event of a tie, the following first tiebreaker will apply: The teams will be ranked by the most point gained per match as follows:
  - Match won 3–0 or 3–1: 3 points for the winner, 0 points for the loser
  - Match won 3–2: 2 points for the winner, 1 point for the loser
  - Match forfeited: 3 points for the winner, 0 points (0–25, 0–25, 0–25) for the loser
3. If teams are still tied after examining the number of victories and points gained, then the FIVB will examine the results in order to break the tie in the following order:
  - Set quotient: if two or more teams are tied on the number of points gained, they will be ranked by the quotient resulting from the division of the number of all set won by the number of all sets lost.
  - Points quotient: if the tie persists based on the set quotient, the teams will be ranked by the quotient resulting from the division of all points scored by the total of points lost during all sets.
  - If the tie persists based on the point quotient, the tie will be broken based on the team that won the match of the Round Robin Phase between the tied teams. When the tie in point quotient is between three or more teams, these teams ranked taking into consideration only the matches involving the teams in question.

== Preliminary round ==
- All times are Thailand Standard Time (UTC+07:00).

=== Pool A ===
Pos	Team	Pld	W	L	Pts	SW	SL	SR	SPW	SPL	SPR	Qualification
1	Thailand (H)	3	3	0	9	9	0	MAX	225	134	1.679	Quarterfinals
2	Mongolia	3	2	1	6	6	5	1.200	229	210	1.090	Quarterfinals
3	Australia	3	1	2	3	4	6	0.667	189	221	0.855	9th–16th places
4	Uzbekistan	3	0	3	0	1	9	0.111	166	244	0.680	9th–16th places

Source: asian volleyball site
(H) Host

Date	Time	Venue		Score		Set 1	Set 2	Set 3	Set 4	Set 5	Total	Report
1 July	13:00	T21	Uzbekistan	0–3	Australia	17–25	22–25	19–25			58–75	Report
1 July	19:00	T21	Thailand	3–0	Mongolia	25–15	25–13	25–19			75–47	Report
2 July	13:00	T21	Uzbekistan	1–3	Mongolia	25–19	10–25	13–25	16–25		64–94	Report
2 July	19:00	T21	Thailand	3–0	Australia	25–18	25–14	25–11			75–43	Report
3 July	13:00	T21	Australia	1–3	Mongolia	17–25	11–25	25–13	18–25		71–88	Report
3 July	19:00	T21	Thailand	3–0	Uzbekistan	25–14	25–17	25–13			75–44	Report

=== Pool B ===
Pos	Team	Pld	W	L	Pts	SW	SL	SR	SPW	SPL	SPR	Qualification
1	China	3	3	0	9	9	0	MAX	225	91	2.473	Quarterfinals
2	Kazakhstan	3	2	1	6	6	3	2.000	181	162	1.117	Quarterfinals
3	Hong Kong	3	1	2	2	3	8	0.375	186	241	0.772	9th–16th places
4	Kyrgyzstan	3	0	3	1	2	9	0.222	165	263	0.627	9th–16th places

Source: asian volleyball site

Date	Time	Venue		Score		Set 1	Set 2	Set 3	Set 4	Set 5	Total	Report
1 July	10:00	NRRU	Kazakhstan	3–0	Hong Kong	25–3	25–23	25–15			75–41	Report
1 July	16:00	NRRU	China	3–0	Kyrgyzstan	25–12	25–9	25–7			75–28	Report
2 July	10:00	NRRU	Kazakhstan	3–0	Kyrgyzstan	25–15	25–16	25–15			75–46	Report
2 July	16:00	NRRU	China	3–0	Hong Kong	25–10	25–12	25–10			75–32	Report
3 July	10:00	NRRU	Hong Kong	3–2	Kyrgyzstan	25–27	23–25	25–16	25–11	15–12	113–91	Report
3 July	16:00	NRRU	China	3–0	Kazakhstan	25–15	25–6	25–10			75–31	Report

=== Pool C ===
Pos	Team	Pld	W	L	Pts	SW	SL	SR	SPW	SPL	SPR	Qualification
1	Japan	3	3	0	9	9	0	MAX	232	193	1.202	Quarterfinals
2	Indonesia	3	2	1	6	6	3	2.000	220	193	1.140	Quarterfinals
3	Philippines	3	1	2	3	3	7	0.429	216	239	0.904	9th–16th places
4	Iran	3	0	3	0	1	9	0.111	204	247	0.826	9th–16th places

Source: asian volleyball site

Date	Time	Venue		Score		Set 1	Set 2	Set 3	Set 4	Set 5	Total	Report
1 July	10:00	T21	Iran	1–3	Philippines	19–25	25–19	23–25	18–25		85–94	Report
1 July	16:00	T21	Japan	3–0	Indonesia	25–21	28–26	25–20			78–67	Report
2 July	10:00	T21	Japan	3–0	Philippines	25–20	25–17	26–24			76–61	Report
2 July	16:00	T21	Iran	0–3	Indonesia	15–25	17–25	22–25			54–75	Report
3 July	10:00	T21	Japan	3–0	Iran	27–25	26–24	25–16			78–65	Report
3 July	16:00	T21	Philippines	0–3	Indonesia	22–25	13–25	26–28			61–78	Report

=== Pool D ===
Pos	Team	Pld	W	L	Pts	SW	SL	SR	SPW	SPL	SPR	Qualification
1	South Korea	3	3	0	9	9	1	9.000	252	177	1.424	Quarterfinals
2	Vietnam	3	2	1	6	6	3	2.000	201	157	1.280	Quarterfinals
3	Chinese Taipei	3	1	2	3	4	6	0.667	199	216	0.921	9th–16th places
4	India	3	0	3	0	0	9	0.000	123	225	0.547	9th–16th places

Source: asian volleyball site

Date	Time	Venue		Score		Set 1	Set 2	Set 3	Set 4	Set 5	Total	Report
1 July	13:00	NRRU	South Korea	3–0	India	25–14	25–18	25–16			75–48	Report
1 July	19:00	NRRU	Chinese Taipei	0–3	Vietnam	11–25	20–25	15–25			46–75	Report
2 July	13:00	NRRU	South Korea	3–0	Vietnam	25–18	25–13	25–20			75–51	Report
2 July	19:00	NRRU	Chinese Taipei	3–0	India	25–19	25–16	25–4			75–39	Report
3 July	13:00	NRRU	India	0–3	Vietnam	6–25	11–25	19–25			36–75	Report
3 July	19:00	NRRU	Chinese Taipei	1–3	South Korea	17–25	29–27	17–25	15–25		78–102	Report

== Final round ==
- All times are Thailand Standard Time (UTC+07:00).

=== 9th–16th places ===
13th place match
7 July
Australia	3
Uzbekistan	0
15th place match
7 July
Kyrgyzstan	3
India	0

13th–16th semifinals
6 July
Australia	3
Kyrgyzstan	0
6 July
India	0
Uzbekistan	3

9th–16th quarterfinals
5 July
Australia	1
Iran	3
5 July
Chinese Taipei	3
Kyrgyzstan	0
5 July
Hong Kong	3
India	0
5 July
Philippines	3
Uzbekistan	0

9th–12th semifinals
6 July
Iran	0
Chinese Taipei	3
6 July
Hong Kong	0
Philippines	3

9th place match
7 July
Chinese Taipei	0
Philippines	3
11th place match
7 July
Iran	2
Hong Kong	3

==== 9th–16th quarterfinals ====
Date	Time	Venue		Score		Set 1	Set 2	Set 3	Set 4	Set 5	Total	Report
5 Jul	10:00	NRRU	Australia	1–3	Iran	22–25	25–22	21–25	19–25		87–97	Report
5 Jul	13:00	NRRU	Chinese Taipei	3–0	Kyrgyzstan	25–18	25–13	27–25			77–56	Report
5 Jul	16:00	NRRU	Hong Kong	3–0	India	25–23	25–9	27–25			77–57	Report
5 Jul	19:00	NRRU	Philippines	3–0	Uzbekistan	25–11	25–7	25–9			75–27	Report

==== 13th–16th semifinals ====
Date	Time	Venue		Score		Set 1	Set 2	Set 3	Set 4	Set 5	Total	Report
6 Jul	10:00	NRRU	Australia	3–0	Kyrgyzstan	25–17	26–24	25–16			76–57	Report
6 Jul	13:00	NRRU	India	0–3	Uzbekistan	21–25	20–25	19–25			60–75	Report

==== 9th–12th semifinals ====
Date	Time	Venue		Score		Set 1	Set 2	Set 3	Set 4	Set 5	Total	Report
6 Jul	16:00	NRRU	Iran	0–3	Chinese Taipei	18–25	22–25	16–25			56–75	Report
6 Jul	19:00	NRRU	Hong Kong	0–3	Philippines	20–25	19–25	19–25			58–75	Report

==== 15th place match ====
Date	Time	Venue		Score		Set 1	Set 2	Set 3	Set 4	Set 5	Total	Report
7 Jul	10:00	NRRU	Kyrgyzstan	3–0	India	32–30	25–13	25–17			82–60	Report

==== 13th place match ====
Date	Time	Venue		Score		Set 1	Set 2	Set 3	Set 4	Set 5	Total	Report
7 Jul	13:00	NRRU	Australia	3–0	Uzbekistan	25–19	25–22	27–25			77–66	Report

==== 11th place match ====
Date	Time	Venue		Score		Set 1	Set 2	Set 3	Set 4	Set 5	Total	Report
7 Jul	16:00	NRRU	Iran	2–3	Hong Kong	25–23	19–25	18–25	25–16	12–15	99–104	Report

==== 9th place match ====
Date	Time	Venue		Score		Set 1	Set 2	Set 3	Set 4	Set 5	Total	Report
7 Jul	19:00	NRRU	Chinese Taipei	0–3	Philippines	20–25	20–25	21–25			61–75	Report

=== Final Eight ===
5th place match
7 July
Kazakhstan	0
Vietnam	3
7th place match
7 July
Indonesia	3
Mongolia	1

5th–8th semifinals
6 July
Indonesia	2
Kazakhstan	3
6 July
Vietnam	3
Mongolia	0

Quarterfinals
5 July
Thailand	3
Indonesia	0
5 July
South Korea	3
Kazakhstan	1
5 July
China	3
Vietnam	1
5 July
Japan	3
Mongolia	0

Semifinals
6 July
Thailand	1
South Korea	3
6 July
China	3
Japan	0

Final
7 July
South Korea	0
China	3
3rd place match
7 July
Thailand	3
Japan	2

==== Quarterfinals ====
Date	Time	Venue		Score		Set 1	Set 2	Set 3	Set 4	Set 5	Total	Report
5 Jul	10:00	T21	Japan	3–0	Mongolia	25–23	25–11	25–18			75–52	Report
5 Jul	13:00	T21	China	3–1	Vietnam	25–20	25–19	20–25	25–13		95–77	Report
5 Jul	16:00	T21	South Korea	3–1	Kazakhstan	26–24	25–19	21–25	25–16		97–84	Report
5 Jul	19:00	T21	Thailand	3–0	Indonesia	25–18	25–12	25–19			75–49	Report

==== 5th–8th semifinals ====
Date	Time	Venue		Score		Set 1	Set 2	Set 3	Set 4	Set 5	Total	Report
6 Jul	10:00	T21	Vietnam	3–0	Mongolia	25–12	25–18	25–22			75–52	Report
6 Jul	13:00	T21	Indonesia	2–3	Kazakhstan	25–17	23–25	17–25	25–21	13–15	103–103	Report

==== Semifinals ====
Date	Time	Venue		Score		Set 1	Set 2	Set 3	Set 4	Set 5	Total	Report
6 Jul	16:00	T21	China	3–0	Japan	25–19	25–23	25–22			75–64	Report
6 Jul	19:00	T21	Thailand	1–3	South Korea	25–17	25–27	12–25	14–25		76–94	Report

==== 7th place match ====
Date	Time	Venue		Score		Set 1	Set 2	Set 3	Set 4	Set 5	Total	Report
7 Jul	10:00	T21	Indonesia	3–1	Mongolia	22–25	25–20	25–12	25–17		97–74	Report

==== 5th place match ====
Date	Time	Venue		Score		Set 1	Set 2	Set 3	Set 4	Set 5	Total	Report
7 Jul	13:00	T21	Kazakhstan	0–3	Vietnam	21–25	15–25	23–25			59–75	Report

==== 3rd place match ====
Date	Time	Venue		Score		Set 1	Set 2	Set 3	Set 4	Set 5	Total	Report
7 Jul	16:00	T21	Thailand	3–2	Japan	14–25	25–21	25–19	23–25	15–12	102–102	Report

==== Final ====
Date	Time	Venue		Score		Set 1	Set 2	Set 3	Set 4	Set 5	Total	Report
7 Jul	19:00	T21	South Korea	0–3	China	23–25	16–25	16–25			55–75	Report

== Final standing ==
Rank	Team
1st place, gold medalist(s)	China
2nd place, silver medalist(s)	South Korea
3rd place, bronze medalist(s)	Thailand
4	Japan
5	Vietnam
6	Kazakhstan
7	Indonesia
8	Mongolia
9	Philippines
10	Chinese Taipei
11	Hong Kong
12	Iran
13	Australia
14	Uzbekistan
15	Kyrgyzstan
16	India

Qualified for the 2027 U19 World Championship
Qualified for the 2027 U19 World Championship as host

2026 AVC Girls' U18 champions

China
Sixth title

14–woman roster
Chen Xiaohui, Xu Ruilin, Zhao Yuhan, Si Jingyu, Chen Ruihan, Chen Xinyi, Zhang Yijia, Ren Sichen, Xuan Yachen, Li Mingjing, Chen Yulin, Wang Xinyu, Chen Qien, Niu Sidi
Head coach
Yuan Zhi

== Awards ==
- Most valuable player
  Xuan Yachen (CHN)
- Best setter
  Xuan Yachen (CHN)
- Best outside spikers
  Ren Sichen (CHN)
  Natchaya Ta-Hae (THA)
- Best middle blockers
  Si Jingyu (CHN)
  Park Seo-yoon (KOR)
- Best opposite spiker
  Zhang Yijia (CHN)
- Best libero
  Cho Li-bin (KOR)

== Qualified teams for FIVB U19 World Championship ==
The following teams from AVC qualified for the 2027 FIVB Girls' U19 World Championship.

Team	Qualified on	Previous appearances in the FIVB U19 World Championship^{1}
Japan	5 July 2026	16 (1989, 1991, 1993, **1995**, 1997, **1999**, 2001, 2007, 2009, 2011, 2013, 2015, 2017, 2019, 2023, 2025)
China	5 July 2026	14 (1995, 1999, **2001**, **2003**, 2005, **2007**, 2009, 2011, **2013**, 2015, 2017, 2019, 2023, 2025)
South Korea	5 July 2026	13 (1989, **1991**, 1993, 1995, 1997, 1999, 2001, 2005, 2007, 2015, 2017, 2019, 2023)
Thailand	5 July 2026	11 (1997, 2003, 2009, 2011, 2013, 2015, 2017, 2019, 2021, 2023, 2025)

^{1} Bold indicates champions for that year.

== See also ==
- 2026 AVC Women's Volleyball Cup
