= 2022 Asian Women's U18 Volleyball Championship =

2022 Women's U18 Volleyball Championship

Tournament details
- Host country: Thailand
- City: Nakhon Pathom
- Dates: 6–13 June
- Teams: 11 (from 1 confederation)
- Venue: 1 (in 1 host city)

Final positions
- Champions: Japan (9th title)
- Runners-up: China
- Third place: South Korea
- Fourth place: Thailand

Tournament statistics
- Matches played: 35
- Attendance: 13,570 (388 per match)

The 2022 Asian Women's U18 Volleyball Championship was the 14th edition of the Asian Women's U18 Volleyball Championship, a biennial international women's volleyball tournament organised by the Asian Volleyball Confederation (AVC), in 2022 with the Thailand Volleyball Association (TVA), for the under–18 women's national teams of Asia.

The tournament was held in Nakhon Pathom, Thailand, from 6 to 13 June 2022. The tournament was supposed to be hosted by Uzbekistan on the same dates, but due to unforeseen reasons Nakhon Pathom replaced Tashkent as the host city for the eight-day Championship. That year, the previously U17 tournament was adjusted to become an U18 championship as approved by the AVC Board of Administration.

Like the previous editions, the tournament acted as the AVC qualifiers for the FIVB Volleyball Girls' U19 World Championship. The top four teams qualified for the 2023 FIVB Volleyball Girls' U19 World Championship as the AVC's representatives.

A total of eleven teams played in the tournament, with players born on or after 1 January 2005 eligible to participate. It was originally a U-17 competition for players born on or after 2006, but as the change to a U-18 tournament proceeded, the age restriction was changed to 2005.

== Qualified teams ==
Following AVC regulations, the maximum of 16 teams in all AVC events were selected according to the following:

- 1 team for the host country
- 10 teams based on the final standing of the previous edition
- 5 teams from each of 5 zones (with a qualification tournament if needed)

=== Qualified associations ===
Country	Zone	Qualified as	Qualified on	Previous appearances			Previous best performance
Country	Zone	Qualified as	Qualified on	Total	First	Last	Previous best performance
Japan	EAZVA	2018 Asian Championship champions	27 May 2018	11	1997	2018	Champions (1997, 2007, 2008, 2010, 2012, 2014, 2017, 2018)
China	EAZVA	2018 Asian Championship runners-up	27 May 2018	12	1997	2018	Champions (1999, 2001, 2003, 2005)
Thailand	SEAZVA	2018 Asian Championship 3rd place and host country	27 May 2018	12	1997	2018	Runners-up (2014)
South Korea	EAZVA	2018 Asian Championship 4th place	27 May 2018	12	1997	2018	Runners-up (1997, 2005, 2007)
Chinese Taipei	EAZVA	2018 Asian Championship 5th place	27 May 2018	12	1997	2018	3rd place (1999, 2008, 2010)
Kazakhstan	CAZVA	2018 Asian Championship 6th place	27 May 2018	6	2003	2018	6th place (2003, 2010, 2014, 2018)
Iran	CAZVA	2018 Asian Championship 7th place	27 May 2018	6	2008	2018	7th place (2018)
India	CAZVA	2018 Asian Championship 8th place	27 May 2018	9	2001	2018	5th place (2003)
Australia	OZVA	2018 Asian Championship 9th place	27 May 2018	11	1999	2018	6th place (1999)
~~New Zealand~~	~~OZVA~~	~~2018 Asian Championship 10th place~~	~~27 May 2018~~	~~4~~	~~2010~~	~~2018~~	~~8th place (2014, 2017)~~
Uzbekistan	CAZVA	Automatically qualified as CAZVA wild card	15 January 2022	1	2017	2017	10th place (2017)
Philippines	SEAZVA	Automatically qualified as SEAZVA wild card	15 January 2022	6	1997	2014	7th place (2014)

== Format and Pools composition ==
According to the unveiled competition schedule, all participating teams would be split into Pool A and Pool B. Teams would compete in pool round-robin preliminaries, with the top two teams in each pool advancing to the cross semifinals. Teams finishing 3rd and 4th in each pool would next compete in the classification round for the 5th–8th places, while those finishing 5th and 6th in each pool will fight for the 9th, 10th and 11th places.

Pool A	Pool B
Thailand (Host)	Japan
South Korea	China
Iran	Chinese Taipei
Australia	Kazakhstan
Uzbekistan	India
—N/a	Philippines

== Venues ==
The tournament was hosted at the Nakhon Pathom Sports Center Gymnasium in Mueang Nakhon Pathom, Nakhon Pathom.

All rounds
Nakhon Pathom, Thailand
Nakhon Pathom Sports Center Gymnasium
Capacity: 4,000

== Pool standing procedure ==
1. Total number of victories (matches won, matches lost)
2. In the event of a tie, the following first tiebreaker will apply: The teams will be ranked by the most point gained per match as follows:
  - Match won 3–0 or 3–1: 3 points for the winner, 0 points for the loser
  - Match won 3–2: 2 points for the winner, 1 point for the loser
  - Match forfeited: 3 points for the winner, 0 points (0–25, 0–25, 0–25) for the loser
3. If teams are still tied after examining the number of victories and points gained, then the FIVB will examine the results in order to break the tie in the following order:
  - Set quotient: if two or more teams are tied on the number of points gained, they will be ranked by the quotient resulting from the division of the number of all set won by the number of all sets lost.
  - Points quotient: if the tie persists based on the set quotient, the teams will be ranked by the quotient resulting from the division of all points scored by the total of points lost during all sets.
  - If the tie persists based on the point quotient, the tie will be broken based on the team that won the match of the Round Robin Phase between the tied teams. When the tie in point quotient is between three or more teams, these teams ranked taking into consideration only the matches involving the teams in question.

== Preliminary round ==
- All times are Indochina Time (UTC+07:00)

=== Pool A ===
Pos	Team	Pld	W	L	Pts	SW	SL	SR	SPW	SPL	SPR	Qualification
1	South Korea	4	4	0	12	12	0	MAX	300	167	1.796	Semifinals
2	Thailand (H)	4	3	1	9	9	4	2.250	301	244	1.234	Semifinals
3	Iran	4	2	2	6	7	6	1.167	265	257	1.031	5th–8th semifinals
4	Uzbekistan	4	1	3	3	3	10	0.300	212	302	0.702	5th–8th semifinals
5	Australia	4	0	4	0	1	12	0.083	210	318	0.660	9th–11th semifinals

(H) Host

Date	Time		Score		Set 1	Set 2	Set 3	Set 4	Set 5	Total	Report
6 Jun	09:00	Australia	0–3	Iran	19–25	18–25	16–25			53–75	P2
6 Jun	16:30	Thailand	3–0	Uzbekistan	25–15	25–15	25–17			75–47	P2
7 Jun	09:00	South Korea	3–0	Uzbekistan	25–9	25–15	25–12			75–36	P2
7 Jun	16:30	Australia	0–3	Thailand	18–25	16–25	9–25			43–75	P2
8 Jun	11:30	South Korea	3–0	Australia	25–11	25–15	25–11			75–37	P2
8 Jun	16:30	Iran	1–3	Thailand	17–25	25–18	20–25	17–25		79–93	P2
9 Jun	09:00	Uzbekistan	3–1	Australia	25–13	25–15	17–25	26–24		93–77	P2
9 Jun	19:00	Iran	0–3	South Korea	8–25	12–25	16–25			36–75	P2
11 Jun	11:30	Uzbekistan	0–3	Iran	9–25	15–25	12–25			36–75	P2
11 Jun	16:30	Thailand	0–3	South Korea	20–25	19–25	19–25			58–75	P2

=== Pool B ===
Pos	Team	Pld	W	L	Pts	SW	SL	SR	SPW	SPL	SPR	Qualification
1	Japan	5	5	0	15	15	0	MAX	377	248	1.520	Semifinals
2	China	5	4	1	12	12	3	4.000	367	219	1.676	Semifinals
3	Chinese Taipei	5	3	2	9	9	7	1.286	341	326	1.046	5th–8th semifinals
4	Kazakhstan	5	2	3	6	7	10	0.700	339	374	0.906	5th–8th semifinals
5	India	5	1	4	3	4	13	0.308	279	408	0.684	9th place match
6	Philippines	5	0	5	0	1	15	0.067	262	390	0.672	9th–11th semifinals

Date	Time		Score		Set 1	Set 2	Set 3	Set 4	Set 5	Total	Report
6 Jun	11:30	Kazakhstan	1–3	Chinese Taipei	25–21	21–25	19–25	18–25		83–96	P2
6 Jun	14:00	Philippines	1–3	India	25–14	21–25	23–25	19–25		88–89	P2
6 Jun	19:00	China	0–3	Japan	20–25	25–27	22–25			67–77	P2
7 Jun	11:30	Philippines	0–3	Kazakhstan	24–26	19–25	15–25			58–76	P2
7 Jun	14:00	Japan	3–0	India	25–11	25–10	25–18			75–39	P2
7 Jun	19:00	China	3–0	Chinese Taipei	25–16	25–20	25–9			75–45	P2
8 Jun	09:00	India	1–3	Kazakhstan	25–20	20–25	11–25	14–25		70–95	P2
8 Jun	14:00	China	3–0	Philippines	25–7	25–7	25–13			75–27	P2
8 Jun	19:00	Chinese Taipei	0–3	Japan	22–25	12–25	16–25			50–75	P2
9 Jun	11:30	China	3–0	India	25–9	25–12	25–12			75–33	P2
9 Jun	14:00	Japan	3–0	Kazakhstan	25–9	25–17	25–22			75–48	P2
9 Jun	16:30	Chinese Taipei	3–0	Philippines	25–20	25–17	25–8			75–45	P2
11 Jun	09:00	Philippines	0–3	Japan	11–25	18–25	15–25			44–75	P2
11 Jun	14:00	Kazakhstan	0–3	China	12–25	10–25	15–25			37–75	P2
11 Jun	19:00	Chinese Taipei	3–0	India	25–19	25–18	25–11			75–48	P2

== Final round ==
- All times are Indochina Time (UTC+07:00)

=== 9th–11th Classification round ===
9th–11th semifinals
12 June – Nakhon Pathom
Australia	0
Philippines	3
India	3
bye	W

9th place match
13 June – Nakhon Pathom
Philippines	3
India	0
11th place match
Australia	3
bye	W

==== 9th–11th semifinals ====
Date	Time		Score		Set 1	Set 2	Set 3	Set 4	Set 5	Total	Report
12 Jun	09:00	Australia	0–3	Philippines	20–25	19–25	29–31			68–81	P2

==== 9th place match ====
Date	Time		Score		Set 1	Set 2	Set 3	Set 4	Set 5	Total	Report
13 Jun	09:00	Philippines	3–0	India	25–21	25–19	25–12			75–52	P2

=== 5th–8th Classification round ===
5th–8th semifinals
12 June – Nakhon Pathom
Iran	0
Kazakhstan	3
12 June – Nakhon Pathom
Chinese Taipei	3
Uzbekistan	1

5th place match
13 June – Nakhon Pathom
Kazakhstan	0
Chinese Taipei	3
7th place match
13 June – Nakhon Pathom
Iran	3
Uzbekistan	1

==== 5th–8th semifinals ====
Date	Time		Score		Set 1	Set 2	Set 3	Set 4	Set 5	Total	Report
12 Jun	11:30	Iran	0–3	Kazakhstan	23–25	18–25	21–25			62–75	P2
12 Jun	14:00	Chinese Taipei	3–1	Uzbekistan	25–19	25–23	18–25	25–15		93–82	P2

==== 7th place match ====
Date	Time		Score		Set 1	Set 2	Set 3	Set 4	Set 5	Total	Report
13 Jun	11:30	Iran	3–1	Uzbekistan	24–26	25–22	25–15	25–8		99–71	P2

==== 5th place match ====
Date	Time		Score		Set 1	Set 2	Set 3	Set 4	Set 5	Total	Report
13 Jun	14:00	Kazakhstan	0–3	Chinese Taipei	19–25	13–25	17–25			49–75	P2

=== Final Four ===
Semifinals
12 June – Nakhon Pathom
South Korea	1
China	3
12 June – Nakhon Pathom
Japan	3
Thailand	0

Final
13 June – Nakhon Pathom
China	2
Japan	3
3rd place match
13 June – Nakhon Pathom
South Korea	3
Thailand	2

==== Semifinals ====
Date	Time		Score		Set 1	Set 2	Set 3	Set 4	Set 5	Total	Report
12 Jun	16:30	South Korea	1–3	China	27–25	16–25	10–25	23–25		76–100	P2
12 Jun	19:00	Japan	3–0	Thailand	25–11	25–19	26–24			76–54	P2

==== 3rd place match ====
Date	Time		Score		Set 1	Set 2	Set 3	Set 4	Set 5	Total	Report
13 Jun	16:30	South Korea	3–2	Thailand	17–25	25–14	23–25	25–11	15–9	105–84	P2

==== Final ====
Date	Time		Score		Set 1	Set 2	Set 3	Set 4	Set 5	Total	Report
13 Jun	19:00	China	2–3	Japan	25–19	28–26	21–25	17–25	13–15	104–110	P2

== Final standing ==
Rank	Team
1st place, gold medalist(s)	Japan
2nd place, silver medalist(s)	China
3rd place, bronze medalist(s)	South Korea
4	Thailand
5	Chinese Taipei
6	Kazakhstan
7	Iran
8	Uzbekistan
9	Philippines
10	India
11	Australia

Qualified for the 2023 Girls' U19 World Championship

2022 Women's Asian U18 champions

Japan
9th title

12–woman roster
Kokomi Kawamata, Miuka Watanabe, Ciara Mie Athina Hirano, Riri Kasai (c), Sae Omori, Cindy Chisom Ndigwe, Miku Akimoto, Yuzuki Baba, Mio Kitagawa, Kokoro Hidaka, Sanae Yoshida, Rin Nishikawa
Head coach
Daichi Saegusa

== Awards ==
- Most valuable player
  (Japan) Omori Sae
- Best setter
  (Japan) Yoshida Sanae
- Best outside spikers
  (Japan) Omori Sae
  (China) Chen Xinyue
- Best middle blockers
  (China) Shan Linqian
  (South Korea) Kim Sebeen
- Best opposite spiker
  (China) Wang Yindi
- Best libero
  (Japan) Nishikawa Rin

== See also ==
- 2022 Asian Boys' U18 Volleyball Championship
