= 2024 Asian Women's U18 Volleyball Championship =

Volleyball tournament in Asia

Tournament details
- Host country: Thailand
- Cities: Nakhon Pathom; Ratchaburi
- Dates: 16–23 June
- Teams: 13 (from 1 confederation)
- Venue: 2 (in 2 host cities)

Final positions
- Champions: China (5th title)
- Runners-up: Japan
- Third place: Chinese Taipei
- Fourth place: Thailand

Tournament awards
- MVP: (China) Yang Shuming
- Best Setter: (Japan) Tanyama Tsubaki
- Best OH: (China) Zhai Yurui; (Chinese Taipei) Chen Pinyu
- Best MB: (China) Wang Aoqian; (Thailand) Sasitorn Jatta
- Best OPP: (Japan) Chugangi Rion
- Best Libero: (China) Song Jiayi

Tournament statistics
- Matches played: 38
- Attendance: 12,700 (334 per match)

The 2024 Asian Women's U18 Volleyball Championship was the 15th edition of the Asian Women's U18 Volleyball Championship, a biennial international women's volleyball tournament organized by the Asian Volleyball Confederation (AVC), in 2024 with the Thailand Volleyball Association (TVA), for the under–18 women's national teams of Asia. The tournament was held in Nakhon Pathom, Thailand, from 16 to 23 June 2024.

Same as previous editions, the tournament acted as the AVC qualifiers for the FIVB Volleyball Girls' U19 World Championship. The top four teams qualified for the 2025 FIVB Volleyball Girls' U19 World Championship as AVC's representatives.

A total of 13 teams played in the tournament, with players born on or after 1 January 2007 eligible to participate.

China won their fifth title of the tournament after sweeping Japan in the final. Chinese Taipei defeated Thailand in the third place match (3–0).

== Venues ==
- Nakhon Pathom Sports Center Gymnasium, located in Mueang Nakhon Pathom, Nakhon Pathom For Group A, D and Final Eight
- Ratchaburi Gymnasium, located in Mueang Ratchaburi, Ratchaburi For Group B, C and 9th–13th places

== Pool standing procedure ==
1. Total number of victories (matches won, matches lost)
2. In the event of a tie, the following first tiebreaker will apply: The teams will be ranked by the most point gained per match as follows:
  - Match won 3–0 or 3–1: 3 points for the winner, 0 points for the loser
  - Match won 3–2: 2 points for the winner, 1 point for the loser
  - Match forfeited: 3 points for the winner, 0 points (0–25, 0–25, 0–25) for the loser
3. If teams are still tied after examining the number of victories and points gained, then the FIVB will examine the results in order to break the tie in the following order:
  - Set quotient: if two or more teams are tied on the number of points gained, they will be ranked by the quotient resulting from the division of the number of all set won by the number of all sets lost.
  - Points quotient: if the tie persists based on the set quotient, the teams will be ranked by the quotient resulting from the division of all points scored by the total of points lost during all sets.
  - If the tie persists based on the point quotient, the tie will be broken based on the team that won the match of the Round Robin Phase between the tied teams. When the tie in point quotient is between three or more teams, these teams ranked taking into consideration only the matches involving the teams in question.

== Preliminary round ==
- All times are Thailand Standard Time (UTC+07:00).

=== Pool A ===
Pos	Team	Pld	W	L	Pts	SW	SL	SR	SPW	SPL	SPR	Qualification
1	Thailand (H)	2	2	0	6	6	0	MAX	150	65	2.308	Pool E
2	Uzbekistan	2	1	1	3	3	4	0.750	124	140	0.886	Pool E
3	Macau	2	0	2	0	1	6	0.167	96	165	0.582	Pool 9–13

Source: Daily Bulletin No.4
(H) Host

Date	Time	Venue		Score		Set 1	Set 2	Set 3	Set 4	Set 5	Total	Report
16 Jun	17:30	NPG	Uzbekistan	3–1	Macau	25–12	15–25	25–7	25–21		90–65	Report
17 Jun	17:30	NPG	Thailand	3–0	Macau	25–7	25–11	25–13			75–31	Report
18 Jun	17:30	NPG	Uzbekistan	0–3	Thailand	15–25	9–25	10–25			34–75	Report

=== Pool B ===
Pos	Team	Pld	W	L	Pts	SW	SL	SR	SPW	SPL	SPR	Qualification
1	Japan	2	2	0	6	6	0	MAX	150	88	1.705	Pool E
2	Iran	2	1	1	3	3	3	1.000	128	134	0.955	Pool E
3	Philippines	2	0	2	0	0	6	0.000	94	150	0.627	Pool 9–13

Source: Daily Bulletin No.4

Date	Time	Venue		Score		Set 1	Set 2	Set 3	Set 4	Set 5	Total	Report
16 Jun	16:30	RG	Iran	3–0	Philippines	25–20	25–19	25–20			75–59	Report
17 Jun	16:30	RG	Japan	3–0	Iran	25–17	25–19	25–17			75–53	Report
18 Jun	16:30	RG	Philippines	0–3	Japan	5–25	16–25	14–25			35–75	Report

=== Pool C ===
Pos	Team	Pld	W	L	Pts	SW	SL	SR	SPW	SPL	SPR	Qualification
1	China	2	2	0	6	6	0	MAX	150	71	2.113	Pool E
2	Kazakhstan	2	1	1	2	3	5	0.600	130	179	0.726	Pool E
3	Hong Kong	2	0	2	1	2	6	0.333	143	173	0.827	Pool 9–13

Source: Daily Bulletin No.4

Date	Time	Venue		Score		Set 1	Set 2	Set 3	Set 4	Set 5	Total	Report
16 Jun	14:00	RG	Kazakhstan	3–2	Hong Kong	25–21	25–21	14–25	19–25	15–12	98–104	Report
17 Jun	14:00	RG	China	3–0	Kazakhstan	25–9	25–7	25–16			75–32	Report
18 Jun	17:30	RG	Hong Kong	0–3	China	21–25	8–25	10–25			39–75	Report

=== Pool D ===
Pos	Team	Pld	W	L	Pts	SW	SL	SR	SPW	SPL	SPR	Qualification
1	Chinese Taipei	3	3	0	9	9	0	MAX	225	134	1.679	Pool E
2	South Korea	3	2	1	6	6	4	1.500	220	191	1.152	Pool E
3	Australia	3	1	2	3	4	7	0.571	221	256	0.863	Pool 9–13
4	India	3	0	3	0	1	9	0.111	162	247	0.656	Pool 9–13

Source: Daily Bulletin No.4

Date	Time	Venue		Score		Set 1	Set 2	Set 3	Set 4	Set 5	Total	Report
16 Jun	12:30	NPG	India	0–3	Chinese Taipei	14–25	12–25	9–25			35–75	Report
16 Jun	15:00	NPG	South Korea	3–1	Australia	25–18	21–25	25–13	25–18		96–74	Report
17 Jun	12:30	NPG	Australia	3–1	India	25–20	22–25	25–18	25–22		97–85	Report
17 Jun	15:00	NPG	South Korea	0–3	Chinese Taipei	21–25	12–25	16–25			49–75	Report
18 Jun	12:30	NPG	Chinese Taipei	3–0	Australia	25–20	25–10	25–20			75–50	Report
18 Jun	15:00	NPG	South Korea	3–0	India	25–11	25–15	25–16			75–42	Report

== Classification round ==
- All times are Thailand Standard Time (UTC+07:00).

=== Pool E ===
Pos	Team	Pld	W	L	Pts	SW	SL	SR	SPW	SPL	SPR	Qualification
1	China	3	3	0	9	9	0	MAX	225	118	1.907	Final four
2	Thailand (H)	3	2	1	6	6	4	1.500	223	184	1.212	Final four
3	Kazakhstan	3	1	2	3	4	7	0.571	202	250	0.808	5th–8th places
4	Uzbekistan	3	0	3	0	1	9	0.111	147	245	0.600	5th–8th places

Source: Daily Bulletin No.6
(H) Host

Date	Time	Venue		Score		Set 1	Set 2	Set 3	Set 4	Set 5	Total	Report
20 Jun	15:00	NPG	Uzbekistan	0–3	China	11–25	12–25	11–25			34–75	Report
20 Jun	17:30	NPG	Thailand	3–1	Kazakhstan	25–15	25–18	21–25	25–17		96–75	Report
21 Jun	15:00	NPG	Uzbekistan	1–3	Kazakhstan	25–27	25–18	12–25	17–25		79–95	Report
21 Jun	17:30	NPG	Thailand	0–3	China	21–25	22–25	9–25			52–75	Report

=== Pool F ===
Pos	Team	Pld	W	L	Pts	SW	SL	SR	SPW	SPL	SPR	Qualification
1	Japan	3	3	0	8	9	2	4.500	262	208	1.260	Final four
2	Chinese Taipei	3	2	1	6	6	3	2.000	206	174	1.184	Final four
3	South Korea	3	1	2	4	5	6	0.833	223	228	0.978	5th–8th places
4	Iran	3	0	3	0	0	9	0.000	144	225	0.640	5th–8th places

Source: Daily Bulletin No.6

Date	Time	Venue		Score		Set 1	Set 2	Set 3	Set 4	Set 5	Total	Report
20 Jun	10:00	NPG	Japan	3–2	South Korea	25–18	25–19	22–25	25–27	15–10	112–99	Report
20 Jun	12:30	NPG	Iran	0–3	Chinese Taipei	19–25	13–25	18–25			50–75	Report
21 Jun	10:00	NPG	Iran	0–3	South Korea	10–25	20–25	11–25			41–75	Report
21 Jun	12:30	NPG	Japan	3–0	Chinese Taipei	25–18	25–22	25–16			75–56	Report

=== Pool 9–13 ===
Pos	Team	Pld	W	L	Pts	SW	SL	SR	SPW	SPL	SPR	Qualification
1	Australia	1	1	0	3	3	1	3.000	102	89	1.146	9th place match
2	Philippines	1	1	0	3	3	1	3.000	91	90	1.011	9th place match
3	India	3	1	2	4	6	6	1.000	165	139	1.187	11th place match
4	Hong Kong	2	1	1	3	4	3	1.333	164	141	1.163	11th place match
5	Macau	2	0	2	0	0	6	0.000	87	150	0.580	

Source: Daily Bulletin No.6

Date	Time	Venue		Score		Set 1	Set 2	Set 3	Set 4	Set 5	Total	Report
20 Jun	14:00	RG	Macau	0–3	Hong Kong	16–25	9–25	14–25			39–75	Report
20 Jun	18:00	RG	Philippines	3–1	India	26–24	15–25	25–19	25–22		91–90	Report
21 Jun	14:00	RG	Hong Kong	1–3	Australia	28–26	24–26	17–25	20–25		89–102	Report
21 Jun	16:30	RG	Macau	0–3	India	21–25	10–25	17–25			48–75	Report

== Final round ==
- All times are Thailand Standard Time (UTC+07:00).

=== 11th place match ===
Date	Time	Venue		Score		Set 1	Set 2	Set 3	Set 4	Set 5	Total	Report
22 Jun	14:00	RG	India	0–3	Hong Kong	24–26	21–25	20–25			65–76	Report

=== 9th place match ===
Date	Time	Venue		Score		Set 1	Set 2	Set 3	Set 4	Set 5	Total	Report
22 Jun	16:30	RG	Australia	3–0	Philippines	25–22	25–18	25–20			75–60	Report

=== 5th–8th places ===
5th–8th semifinals
22 June
Iran	3
Kazakhstan	1
22 June
Uzbekistan	0
South Korea	3

5th place match
23 June
Iran	0
South Korea	3
7th place match
23 June
Kazakhstan	3
Uzbekistan	0

==== 5th–8th semifinals ====
Date	Time	Venue		Score		Set 1	Set 2	Set 3	Set 4	Set 5	Total	Report
22 Jun	10:00	NPG	Kazakhstan	1–3	Iran	13–25	25–23	16–25	13–25		67–98	Report
22 Jun	12:30	NPG	Uzbekistan	0–3	South Korea	7–25	7–25	12–25			26–75	Report

==== 7th place match ====
Date	Time	Venue		Score		Set 1	Set 2	Set 3	Set 4	Set 5	Total	Report
13 Jun	10:00	NPG	Kazakhstan	3–0	Uzbekistan	25–8	25–14	25–21			75–43	Report

==== 5th place match ====
Date	Time	Venue		Score		Set 1	Set 2	Set 3	Set 4	Set 5	Total	Report
23 Jun	12:30	NPG	Iran	0–3	South Korea	21–25	22–25	17–25			60–75	Report

=== Final Four ===
Semifinals
22 June
China	3
Chinese Taipei	0
22 June
Thailand	0
Japan	3

Final
23 June
China	3
Japan	0
3rd place match
23 June
Chinese Taipei	3
Thailand	0

==== Semifinals ====
Date	Time	Venue		Score		Set 1	Set 2	Set 3	Set 4	Set 5	Total	Report
22 Jun	15:00	NPG	China	3–0	Chinese Taipei	25–21	25–22	25–16			75–59	Report
22 Jun	17:30	NPG	Japan	3–0	Thailand	27–25	25–15	25–13			77–53	Report

==== 3rd place match ====
Date	Time	Venue		Score		Set 1	Set 2	Set 3	Set 4	Set 5	Total	Report
23 Jun	15:00	NPG	Chinese Taipei	3–0	Thailand	25–17	25–21	25–23			75–61	Report

==== Final ====
Date	Time	Venue		Score		Set 1	Set 2	Set 3	Set 4	Set 5	Total	Report
23 Jun	17:30	NPG	China	3–0	Japan	25–22	25–18	26–24			76–64	Report

== Final standing ==
Rank	Team
1st place, gold medalist(s)	China
2nd place, silver medalist(s)	Japan
3rd place, bronze medalist(s)	Chinese Taipei
4	Thailand
5	South Korea
6	Iran
7	Kazakhstan
8	Uzbekistan
9	Australia
10	Philippines
11	Hong Kong
12	India
13	Macau

Qualified for the 2025 Girls' U19 World Championship

2024 Women's Asian U18 champions

China
Fifth title

12–woman roster
Tang Jingxia, Song Jiayi, Sun Hongyun, Zhu Zhan, Zhai Yurui, Zhang Zixuan, Shen Jiayi, Wang Aoqian, Huang Yuexin, Yang Shuming, Li Yiyi, Chen Yufei
Head coach
Zhao Yong

== Awards ==
Yang Shuming was the 2024 Women's Asian U18 Most Valuable Player.

- Most valuable player
  Yang Shuming (CHN)
- Best setter
  Tanyama Tsubaki (JPN)
- Best outside spikers
  Zhai Yurui (CHN)
  Chen Pinyu (TPE)
- Best middle blockers
  Wang Aoqian (CHN)
  Sasitorn Jatta (THA)
- Best opposite spiker
  Chugangi Rion (JPN)
- Best libero
  Song Jiayi (CHN)

== See also ==
- 2024 Asian Men's U18 Volleyball Championship
- 2024 Asian Women's U20 Volleyball Championship
