= Samoa women's national under-19 volleyball team =

Youth volleyball team representing Samoa

Samoa Under-18
- Association: Samoa Volleyball Federation
- Confederation: AVC

Uniforms
Home

Youth Olympic Games
- Appearances: None

FIVB U19 World Championship
- Appearances: None

AVC U18 Asian Championship
- Appearances: 1 (First in 2017)
- Best result: 11th (2017)

The Samoa women's national under-18 volleyball team represents Samoa in women's under-18 volleyball events. It is controlled and managed by the Samoa Volleyball Federation (SVF) that is a member of Asian volleyball body Asian Volleyball Confederation (AVC) and the international volleyball body government the Fédération Internationale de Volleyball (FIVB).

== Competition history ==
=== Youth Olympic Games ===
- (Singapore) 2010 – Did not enter

=== World Championship ===
- (Brazil) 1989 – Did not qualify
- (Portugal) 1991 – Did not qualify
- (Czechoslovakia) 1993 – Did not qualify
- (France) 1995 – Did not qualify
- (Thailand) 1997 – Did not enter
- (Portugal) 1999 – Did not enter
- (Croatia) 2001 – Did not enter
- (Poland) 2003 – Did not enter
- (Macau) 2005 – Did not enter
- (Mexico) 2007 – Did not enter
- (Thailand) 2009 – Did not enter
- (Turkey) 2011 – Did not enter
- (Thailand) 2013 – Did not enter
- (Peru) 2015 – Did not enter
- (Argentina) 2017 – Did not qualify
- (Mexico) 2019 – Did not enter

=== Asian Championship ===
- (Thailand) 1997 – Did not enter
- (Singapore) 1999 – Did not enter
- (Thailand) 2001 – Did not enter
- (Thailand) 2003 – Did not enter
- (Philippines) 2005 – Did not enter
- (Thailand) 2007 – Did not enter
- (Philippines) 2008 – Did not enter
- (Malaysia) 2010 – Did not enter
- (China) 2012 – Did not enter
- (Thailand) 2014 – Did not enter
- (China) 2017 – 11th
- (Thailand) 2018 – Did not enter
