= Chinese Taipei women's national under-19 volleyball team =

Chinese Taipei Under-18
- Association: Chinese Taipei Volleyball Association
- Confederation: AVC
- Head coach: Mei-Ching Chen

Uniforms
| Home | Away | Third |

Youth Olympic Games
- Appearances: None

FIVB U19 World Championship
- Appearances: 6 (First in 1999)
- Best result: 7th (2001)

AVC U18 Asian Championship
- Appearances: 15 (First in 1997)
- Best result: (bronze) (1999, 2005, 2012, 2024)

The Chinese Taipei women's national under-18 volleyball team represents Taiwan in women's under-18 volleyball events, it is controlled and managed by the Chinese Taipei Volleyball Association (CTVA) that is a member of Asian volleyball body Asian Volleyball Confederation (AVC) and the international volleyball body government the Fédération Internationale de Volleyball (FIVB).

== Team ==
=== Coaching staff ===
| Position | Name |
|---|---|
| Head Coach | (Taiwan) Mei-Ching Chen |

=== Current squad ===
The following 18 players were called up for the 2018 Asian Girls' U17 Volleyball Championship in Nakhon Pathom, Thailand.

== Competition history ==
=== Youth Olympic Games ===
- (Singapore) 2010 – Did not qualify

=== World Championship ===
- (Brazil) 1989 – Did not qualify
- (Portugal) 1991 – Did not qualify
- (Czechoslovakia) 1993 – Did not qualify
- (France) 1995 – Did not qualify
- (Thailand) 1997 – Did not qualify
- (Portugal) 1999 – 13th
- (Croatia) 2001 – 7th
- (Poland) 2003 – 9th
- (Macau) 2005 – 9th
- (Mexico) 2007 – Did not qualify
- (Thailand) 2009 – Did not qualify
- (Turkey) 2011 – Did not qualify
- (Thailand) 2013 – 11th
- (Peru) 2015 – 19th
- (Argentina) 2017 – Did not qualify
- (Egypt) 2019 – Did not qualify
- (Mexico) 2021 – "Did not qualify"

=== Asian Championship ===
- (Thailand) 1997 – 5th
- (Singapore) 1999 – (bronze) Bronze medal
- (Thailand) 2001 – 4th
- (Thailand) 2003 – 4th
- (Philippines) 2005 – (bronze) Bronze medal
- (Thailand) 2007 – 4th
- (Philippines) 2008 – 5th
- (Malaysia) 2010 – 5th
- (China) 2012 – (bronze) Bronze medal
- (Thailand) 2014 – 5th
- (China) 2017 – 5th
- (Thailand) 2018 – 5th
- (Thailand) 2022 – 5th
- (Thailand) 2024 – (bronze) Bronze medal
- (Thailand) 2026 – TBD
