= Australia women's national under-19 volleyball team =

Australia Under-18
- Association: Volleyball Australia
- Confederation: AVC
- Head coach: Myles Roantree

Uniforms
Home

Youth Olympic Games
- Appearances: None

FIVB U19 World Championship
- Appearances: None

AVC U18 Asian Championship
- Appearances: 14 (First in 1999)
- Best result: 6th (1999,2005)

The Australia women's national under-19 volleyball team represents Australia in women's under-19 volleyball events. It is controlled and managed by the Volleyball Australia (VA) that is a member of Asian volleyball body Asian Volleyball Confederation (AVC) and the international volleyball body government the Fédération Internationale de Volleyball (FIVB).

== Team ==
=== Coaching staff ===
Position	Name
Head Coach	(Australia) Myles Roantree

== Competition history ==
=== Youth Olympic Games ===
- (Singapore) 2010 – Did not qualify

=== World Championship ===
- (Brazil) 1989 – Did not qualify
- (Portugal) 1991 – Did not qualify
- (Czechoslovakia) 1993 – Did not qualify
- (France) 1995 – Did not qualify
- (Thailand) 1997 – Did not enter
- (Portugal) 1999 – Did not qualify
- (Croatia) 2001 – Did not qualify
- (Poland) 2003 – Did not qualify
- (Macau) 2005 – Did not qualify
- (Mexico) 2007 – Did not qualify
- (Thailand) 2009 – Did not qualify
- (Turkey) 2011 – Did not qualify
- (Thailand) 2013 – Did not qualify
- (Peru) 2015 – Did not qualify
- (Argentina) 2017 – Did not qualify
- (Mexico) 2019 – Did not qualify

=== Asian Championship ===
- (Thailand) 1997 – Did not enter
- (Singapore) 1999 – 6th
- (Thailand) 2001 – 8th
- (Thailand) 2003 – 7th
- (Philippines) 2005 – 6th
- (Thailand) 2007 – 8th
- (Philippines) 2008 – 7th
- (Malaysia) 2010 – 7th
- (China) 2012 – 11th
- (Thailand) 2014 – 13th
- (China) 2017 – 7th
- (Thailand) 2018 – 9th
- (Thailand) 2022 – 11th
- (Thailand) 2024 – 9th
- (Thailand) 2026 – 13th
