= South Korea women's national under-19 volleyball team =

South Korea Under-18
- Association: Korea Volleyball Association
- Confederation: AVC
- Head coach: Chang Yoon-hee

Uniforms
Home	Away	Third

Youth Olympic Games
- Appearances: None

FIVB U19 World Championship
- Appearances: 12
- Best result: (gold) Champions (1991)

AVC U18 Asian Championship
- Appearances: 11 (First in 1997)
- Best result: (silver) Runner-up (1997, 2005, 2007)

The South Korea women's national under-18 volleyball team represents South Korea in women's under-18 volleyball events, it is controlled and managed by the Korea Volleyball Association (KVA) that is a member of Asian volleyball body Asian Volleyball Confederation (AVC) and the international volleyball body government the Fédération Internationale de Volleyball (FIVB).

== Team ==
=== Coaching staff ===
Position	Name
Head Coach	(South Korea) Chang Yoon-hee

== Competition history ==
=== Youth Olympic Games ===
- (Singapore) 2010 – Did not qualify

=== World Championship ===
- (Brazil) 1989 – 4th
- (Portugal) 1991 – (gold) Champion
- (Czechoslovakia) 1993 – (bronze) Bronze medal
- (France) 1995 – 5th
- (Thailand) 1997 – 4th
- (Portugal) 1999 – (bronze) Bronze medal
- (Croatia) 2001 – 9th
- (Poland) 2003 – Did not enter
- (Macau) 2005 – 5th
- (Mexico) 2007 – 9th
- (Thailand) 2009 – Did not qualify
- (Turkey) 2011 – Did not qualify
- (Thailand) 2013 – Did not qualify
- (Peru) 2015 – 13th
- (Argentina) 2017 – 11th
- (Egypt) 2019 – 13th
- (Mexico) 2021 – withdrew
- (Croatia) (Hungary) 2023 – 11th
- (Croatia) (Serbia) 2025 - Did not qualify

=== Asian Championship ===
- (Thailand) 1997 – (silver) Runner-up
- (Singapore) 1999 – 4th
- (Thailand) 2001 – (bronze) Bronze medal
- (Thailand) 2003 – Did not enter
- (Philippines) 2005 – (silver) Runner-up
- (Thailand) 2007 – (silver) Runner-up
- (Philippines) 2008 – 4th
- (Malaysia) 2010 – 4th
- (China) 2012 – 4th
- (Thailand) 2014 – 4th
- (China) 2017 – (bronze) Bronze medal
- (Thailand) 2018 – 4th
- (Thailand) 2020 – Cancelled
- (Thailand) 2022 – (bronze) Bronze medal
