= Australia national volleyball team =

Australia national volleyball team may refer to:

- Australia men's national volleyball team
- Australia women's national volleyball team
- Australia women's national under-18 volleyball team
