= Sarina Koga =

Japanese volleyball player (born 1996)

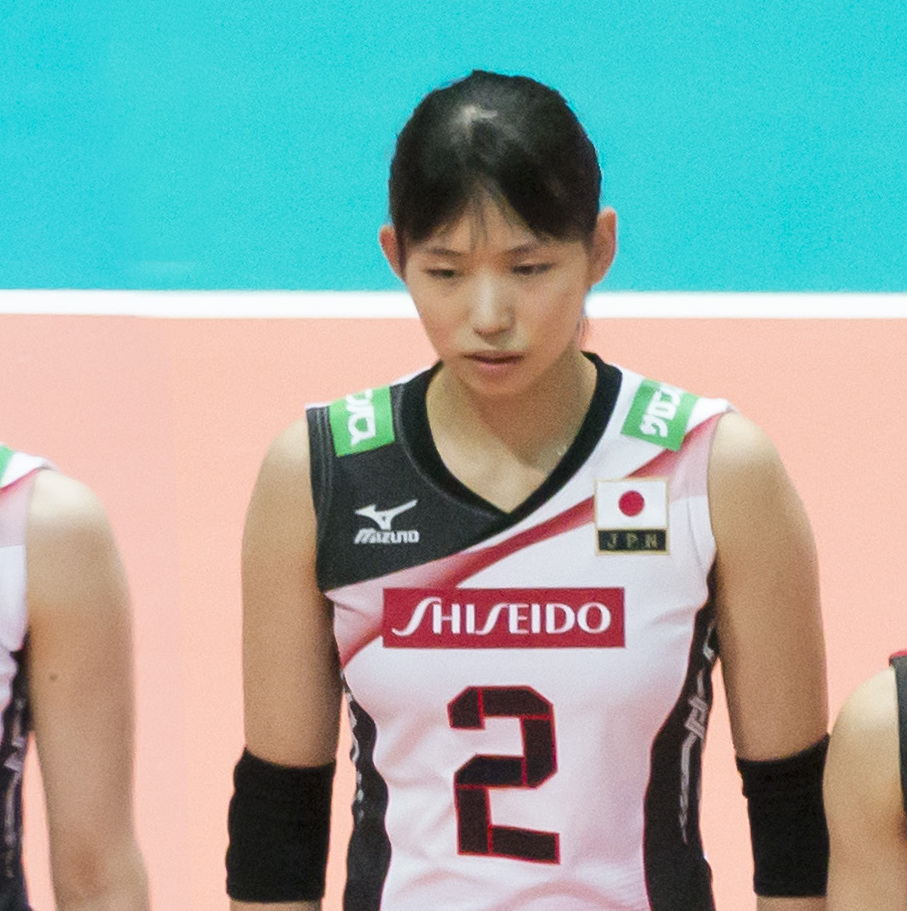
- Koga in 2017

Personal information
- Full name: Sarina Nishida
- Nationality: Japanese
- Born: May 21, 1996 (age 30) Saga, Japan
- Height: 1.80 m (5 ft 11 in)
- Weight: 68 kg (150 lb)
- Spike: 307 cm (121 in)
- Block: 290 cm (114 in)

Volleyball information
- Position: Outside hitter
- Current club: Retired

Career
- Years: Team
- 2015-2024: NEC Red Rockets

National team
- Years: Team
- 2012: U-17 national team
- 2013: U-23 national team
- 2013–2024: Senior national team
Honours
Women's volleyball
Representing Japan
FIVB Nations League
Silver medal – second place	2024 Bangkok	Team
Asian Championship
Gold medal – first place	2017 Biñan/Muntinlupa
FIVB U23 World Championship
Bronze medal – third place	2013 Tijuana
- Updated on August 2024

Sarina Koga (古賀 紗理那, Koga Sarina; born May 21, 1996) or Sarina Nishida (西田 紗理那, Nishida Sarina) is a Japanese retired volleyball player who used to be captain of the Japan women's national volleyball team.

Koga won the bronze medal at the 2013 U23 World Championship with Japan's U23 national team. She also competed at the 2020 Summer Olympics, in women's volleyball. Koga retired after the 2024 Summer Olympics.

== Career ==
Koga played with the Kumamoto Shin-ai Girls' High School team, winning the 2011 All-Japan Junior High School championship and receiving the Excellent Player award. She won the gold medal at the 2012 Asian Youth Girls Championship as part of the National Junior team; she also won the Most Valuable Player award at and Best Scorer of the tournament.

In October 2013, Koga competed in the 2013 FIVB Women's U23 Volleyball World Championship and won the bronze medal. Koga was named one of the best outside spikers, and selected for the competition's all star team, by the FIVB website.

On 23 January 2015, NEC Red Rockets announced her joining the team.

Koga won a silver medal in the 2024 VNL. She announced in July 2024 that the 2024 Paris Olympics would be her final tournament as her decision of retirement.

== Clubs ==
- Kumamoto Shin-ai Girls' High School
- NEC Red Rockets (2015–2024)

== Personal life ==
On 31 December 2022, Koga announced her marriage to the Japan Men's Volleyball Team Opposite Hitter, Yuji Nishida. On July 24, 2025, it was announced through a post in Nishida's official social media account that they are expecting their first child. Koga's husband announced that she has given birth to their first child on December 8, 2025.

== Awards ==
=== Individuals ===
- 2011 All-Japan Junior High School Championship - Excellent Player Award
- 2012 Asian Youth Girls U17 Volleyball Championship (AVC) in Chengdu, China - Best Scorer and MVP
- 2013 All-Japan High School Championship - Excellent Player Award
- 2013 FIVB Women's U23 Volleyball World Championship in Tijuana, Mexico - Best Outside Hitter
- 2015/16 Japan V.Premier League - Best Newcomer Award (Rookie of the Year)
- 2016 Asian Women's Club Volleyball Championship (AVC) in Biñan City, Philippines - MVP (Most Valuable Player)
- 2016/17 Japan V.Premier League - Best6 and MVP (Most Valuable Player)
- 2020/21 Japan V.League - Best6
- 2022 Japan Emperor's Cup and Empress' Cup All Japan Volleyball Championship - MVP (Most Valuable Player)
- 2022/23 Japan V.League - Best6, Best Server and MVP (Most Valuable Player)
- 2023 Japan Emperor's Cup and Empress' Cup All Japan Volleyball Championship - MVP (Most Valuable Player)
- 2023/24 Japan V.League - Best6 and MVP (Most Valuable Player)
- 2024 FIVB Volleyball Nations League in Bangkok, Thailand - Best Outside Hitter

=== Team ===
- 2014/15 Japan V.Premier League - Champion - NEC Red Rockets
- 2016 Asian Women's Club Volleyball Championship (AVC) in Biñan City, Philippines - Champion - NEC Red Rockets
- 2016/17 Japan V.Premier League - Champion - NEC Red Rockets
- 2020/21 Japan V.League - Bronze medal - NEC Red Rockets
- 2022 Japan Emperor's Cup and Empress' Cup All Japan Volleyball Championship - Champion - NEC Red Rockets
- 2022/23 Japan V.League - Champion - NEC Red Rockets
- 2023 Japan Emperor's Cup and Empress' Cup All Japan Volleyball Championship - Champion - NEC Red Rockets
- 2023/24 Japan V.League - Champion - NEC Red Rockets

=== National Team ===
- 2012 Asian Youth Girls U17 Volleyball Championship (AVC) in Chengdu, China - Champion
- 2013 FIVB Women's U23 World Championship in Tijuana, Mexico - Bronze medal
- 2014 Asian Junior Women's U19 Volleyball Championship (AVC) in Chinese Taipei - Silver medal
- 2015 Montreux Volley Masters in Switzerland - Silver medal
- 2017 Asian Senior Women's Volleyball Championship (AVC) in Biñan City, Philippines - Continental Champion
- 2024 FIVB Volleyball Nations League (VNL) in Bangkok, Thailand - Silver medal
