= Kazakhstan women's national under-19 volleyball team =

Kazakhstan
- Association: Volleyball Federation of Republic of Kazakhstan
- Confederation: AVC
- Head coach: Shuto Koichi

Uniforms
Home	Away	Third

Youth Olympic Games
- Appearances: None

FIVB U19 World Championship
- Appearances: None

AVC U18 Asian Championship
- Appearances: 6 (First in 2003)
- Best result: 6th (2003,2010,2014,2018)

The Kazakhstan women's national under-18 volleyball team represents Kazakhstan in women's under-18 volleyball events, it is controlled and managed by the Volleyball Federation of Republic of Kazakhstan (VFRK) that is a member of Asian volleyball body Asian Volleyball Confederation (AVC) and the international volleyball body government the Fédération Internationale de Volleyball (FIVB).

== Team ==
=== Coaching staff ===
Position	Name
Head Coach	(Japan) Shuto Koichi

=== Current squad ===
The following 18 players were called up for the 2018 Asian Girls' U17 Volleyball Championship in Nakhon Pathom, Thailand.

== Competition history ==
=== Youth Olympic Games ===
- (Singapore) 2010 – Did not qualify

=== World Championship ===
- (Brazil) 1989 – Did not qualify
- (Portugal) 1991 – Did not qualify
- (Czechoslovakia) 1993 – Did not qualify
- (France) 1995 – Did not qualify
- (Thailand) 1997 – Did not enter
- (Portugal) 1999 – Did not enter
- (Croatia) 2001 – Did not enter
- (Poland) 2003 – Did not qualify
- (Macau) 2005 – Did not enter
- (Mexico) 2007 – Did not enter
- (Thailand) 2009 – Did not qualify
- (Turkey) 2011 – Did not qualify
- (Thailand) 2013 – Did not qualify
- (Peru) 2015 – Did not qualify
- (Argentina) 2017 – Did not enter
- (Egypt) 2019 – Did not qualify
- (Mexico) 2021 – Did not qualify
- (Croatia) (Hungary) 2023 – Did not qualify
- (Croatia) (Serbia) 2025 – Did not qualify
- (Kazakhstan) 2027 – Qualified as host

=== Asian Championship ===
- (Thailand) 1997 – Did not enter
- (Singapore) 1999 – Did not enter
- (Thailand) 2001 – Did not enter
- (Thailand) 2003 – 6th
- (Philippines) 2005 – Did not enter
- (Thailand) 2007 – Did not enter
- (Philippines) 2008 – 8th
- (Malaysia) 2010 – 6th
- (China) 2012 – 7th
- (Thailand) 2014 – 6th
- (China) 2017 – Did not enter
- (Thailand) 2018 – 6th
- (Thailand) 2020 – "Cancelled"
