= 2018 Asian Women's U17 Volleyball Championship =

Tournament details
- Host country: Thailand
- City: Nakhon Pathom
- Dates: 20–27 May
- Teams: 12 (from 1 confederation)

Final positions
- Champions: Japan (8th title)
- Runners-up: China
- Third place: Thailand
- Fourth place: South Korea

Tournament awards
- MVP: (Japan) Nishikawa Yoshino

The 2018 Asian Women's U17 Volleyball Championship, also referred to as the 2018 SMM Est Cola Asian Girls' U17 Volleyball Championship for sponsorship reasons, was the twelfth edition of the Asian Youth Women Volleyball Championship, a biennial international volleyball tournament organised by the Asian Volleyball Confederation (AVC), that year with the Thailand Volleyball Association (TVA), for the under-17 women's national teams of Asia. The tournament was held in Nakhon Pathom, Thailand, from 20 to 27 May 2018.

A total of thirteen teams played in the tournament, with players born on or after 1 January 2001 eligible to participate.

Like the previous editions, the tournament acted as the AVC qualifiers for the FIVB Volleyball Girls' U18 World Championship. The top four teams qualified for the 2019 FIVB Volleyball Girls' U18 World Championship as the AVC representatives.

== Qualification ==
The thirteen AVC member associations (including the India volleyball team under the Indian Olympic Association, who was suspended by the FIVB, and whose suspension was lifted in May 2018) participated in the tournament, with Thailand already qualified as host country. Eight of the teams participated in the 2017 Asian Girls' U18 Volleyball Championship, while three did not participate in that previous edition. The thirteen AVC member associations were from four zonal associations, namely, Central Asia (3 teams), East Asia (5 teams), Oceania (2 team) and Southeast Asia (2 teams). No West Asian teams participated in this edition.

=== Qualified teams ===
The following teams qualified for the tournament.

Means of qualification	Births	Qualified
Host country	1	Thailand
Central Asian teams	3	India
Central Asian teams	3	Iran
Central Asian teams	3	Kazakhstan
Central Asian teams	3	Uzbekistan
East Asian teams	5	China
East Asian teams	5	Chinese Taipei
East Asian teams	5	Hong Kong
East Asian teams	5	Japan
East Asian teams	5	South Korea
Oceanian teams	2	New Zealand
Oceanian teams	2	Australia
Southeast Asian team	1	Malaysia
Total 12

== Pools composition ==
This was the first Asian Women's U17 Volleyball Championship to use the new competition format. Following the 2017 AVC Board of Administration’s unanimous decision, the new format saw teams being drawn into three or four pools up to the total amount of the participating teams. Each team, as well as the host side, were assigned into a pool according to their previous ranking (2017 Asian Girls' U18 Volleyball Championship). As the three best-ranked teams were drawn in the same Pool A, the next best three contested in Pool B, and the next best three contesting in Pool C. Pool D comprised teams that finished as the next best four teams.

Pool A	Pool B	Pool C	Pool D
Japan (1)	Thailand (4)	Australia (7)	Uzbekistan (10)
China (2)	Chinese Taipei (5)	New Zealand (8)	Kazakhstan (–)
South Korea (3)	Hong Kong (6)	Iran (9)	Malaysia (–)
—N/a	—N/a	—N/a	(International Olympic Committee) India (–)

== Venues ==
- Nakhon Pathom Gymnasium in Mueang Nakhon Pathom, Nakhon Pathom

== Squads ==
Players born on or after 1 January 2002 were eligible to compete in the tournament. Each team were made to register a squad of 12 players from 19 players of their preliminary squad, per Regulations Articles 4.5, 4.6, 5.4 and 5.5.

== Preliminary round ==
- All times are Indochina Time (UTC+07:00)

=== Pool standing procedure ===
1. Number of matches won
2. Match points
3. Sets ratio
4. Points ratio
5. Result of the last match between the tied teams

Match won 3–0 or 3–1: 3 match points for the winner, 0 match points for the loser
Match won 3–2: 2 match points for the winner, 1 match point for the loser
Match forfeited: 0 match points for each.

=== Pool A ===
Pos	Team	Pld	W	L	Pts	SW	SL	SR	SPW	SPL	SPR	Qualification
1	Japan	2	2	0	6	6	2	3.000	188	166	1.133	Quarterfinals
2	South Korea	2	1	1	3	4	4	1.000	170	181	0.939	Quarterfinals
3	China	2	0	2	0	2	6	0.333	179	190	0.942	Quarterfinals

Updated to match(es) played on unknown. Source:
Rules for classification: Pool standing procedure

Date	Time		Score		Set 1	Set 2	Set 3	Set 4	Set 5	Total	Report
20 May	19:00	Japan	3–1	South Korea	25–18	19–25	25–14	25–17		94–74	Report
21 May	14:00	China	1–3	Japan	25–17	25–27	21–25	21–25		92–94	Report
22 May	19:00	South Korea	3–1	China	25–17	21–25	25–23	25–22		96–87	Report

=== Pool B ===
Pos	Team	Pld	W	L	Pts	SW	SL	SR	SPW	SPL	SPR	Qualification
1	Thailand (H)	2	2	0	5	6	2	3.000	182	141	1.291	Quarterfinals
2	Chinese Taipei	2	1	1	4	5	3	1.667	179	135	1.326	Play-offs
3	Hong Kong	2	0	2	0	0	6	0.000	65	150	0.433	Play-offs

Updated to match(es) played on unknown. Source:
Rules for classification: Pool standing procedure
(H) Host

Date	Time		Score		Set 1	Set 2	Set 3	Set 4	Set 5	Total	Report
20 May	14:00	Thailand	3–0	Hong Kong	25–12	25–10	25–15			75–37	Report
21 May	11:30	Chinese Taipei	3–0	Hong Kong	25–10	25–14	25–4			75–28	Report
22 May	14:00	Thailand	3–2	Chinese Taipei	19–25	25–19	21–25	25–20	17–15	107–104	Report

=== Pool C ===
Pos	Team	Pld	W	L	Pts	SW	SL	SR	SPW	SPL	SPR	Qualification
1	Australia	2	2	0	5	6	3	2.000	202	196	1.031	Play-offs
2	Iran	2	1	1	4	5	3	1.667	174	156	1.115	Play-offs
3	New Zealand	2	0	2	0	1	6	0.167	146	170	0.859	Play-offs

Updated to match(es) played on unknown. Source:
Rules for classification: Pool standing procedure

Date	Time		Score		Set 1	Set 2	Set 3	Set 4	Set 5	Total	Report
20 May	16:30	New Zealand	1–3	Australia	23–25	23–25	25–17	26–28		97–95	Report
21 May	16:30	Iran	3–0	New Zealand	25–12	25–20	25–17			75–49	Report
22 May	11:30	Australia	3–2	Iran	22–25	20–25	25–19	25–21	15–9	107–99	Report

=== Pool D ===
Pos	Team	Pld	W	L	Pts	SW	SL	SR	SPW	SPL	SPR	Qualification
1	Kazakhstan	2	2	0	6	6	0	MAX	150	99	1.515	Play-offs
2	India	2	1	1	3	3	4	0.750	148	154	0.961	Play-offs
3	Malaysia	2	0	2	0	1	6	0.167	127	172	0.738	Play-offs
4	Uzbekistan	0	0	0	0	0	0	—	0	0	—	Withdrawn

Updated to match(es) played on unknown. Source:
Rules for classification: Pool standing procedure

Date	Time		Score		Set 1	Set 2	Set 3	Set 4	Set 5	Total	Report
20 May	11:30	Malaysia	0–3	Kazakhstan	11–25	23–25	14–25			48–75	Report
21 May	19:00	India	3–1	Malaysia	22–25	25–22	25–19	25–13		97–79	Report
22 May	16:30	Kazakhstan	3–0	India	25–16	25–22	25–13			75–51	Report

== Bracket composition ==
Pool A		Pool B		Pool C		Pool D	
1	Japan	4	Thailand	7	Australia	10	Kazakhstan
2	South Korea	5	Chinese Taipei	8	Iran	11	India
3	China	6	Hong Kong	9	New Zealand	12	Malaysia

== Final round ==
- All times are Indochina Time (UTC+07:00)

=== Classification round (R9–12) ===
9th–12th places
25 May
New Zealand	3
Malaysia	2
25 May
Hong Kong	1
Australia	3

9th place
27 May
New Zealand	2
Australia	3
11th place
26 May
Hong Kong	2
Malaysia	3

==== Ninth to Twelfth places ====
Date	Time		Score		Set 1	Set 2	Set 3	Set 4	Set 5	Total	Report
25 May	14:30	New Zealand	3–2	Malaysia	17–25	23–25	25–21	27–25	15–10	107–106	Report
25 May	17:00	Hong Kong	1–3	Australia	23–25	25–18	23–25	21–25		92–93	Report

==== Eleventh place ====
Date	Time		Score		Set 1	Set 2	Set 3	Set 4	Set 5	Total	Report
26 May	9:00	Hong Kong	2–3	Malaysia	25–16	21–25	18–25	25–17	13–15	102–98	Report

==== Ninth place ====
Date	Time		Score		Set 1	Set 2	Set 3	Set 4	Set 5	Total	Report
27 May	9:00	New Zealand	2–3	Australia	25–11	13–25	25–23	13–25	12–15	88–99	Report

=== Classification round (R5–8) ===
5th–8th places
26 May
Iran	0
Chinese Taipei	3
26 May
Kazakhstan	3
India	2

5th place
27 May
Chinese Taipei	3
Kazakhstan	0
7th place
27 May
Iran	3
India	1

==== Fifth to Eighth places ====
Date	Time		Score		Set 1	Set 2	Set 3	Set 4	Set 5	Total	Report
26 May	11:30	Iran	0–3	Chinese Taipei	13–25	13–25	15–25			41–75	Report
26 May	14:00	Kazakhstan	3–2	India	25–19	23–25	25–23	19–25	15–12	107–104	Report

==== Seventh place ====
Date	Time		Score		Set 1	Set 2	Set 3	Set 4	Set 5	Total	Report
27 May	11:30	Iran	3–1	India	25–23	20–25	25–16	25–15		95–79	Report

==== Fifth place ====
Date	Time		Score		Set 1	Set 2	Set 3	Set 4	Set 5	Total	Report
27 May	14:00	Kazakhstan	0–3	Chinese Taipei	6–25	12–25	8–25			26–75	Report

=== Championship round (R1–12) ===
Play-offs
23 May
Iran	3
Malaysia	1
23 May
Chinese Taipei	3
New Zealand	0
23 May
Hong Kong	0
Kazakhstan	3
23 May
Australia	0
India	3

Quarter-finals
24 May
Japan	3
Iran	0
24 May
Thailand	3
Chinese Taipei	2
24 May
China	3
Kazakhstan	0
24 May
South Korea	3
India	0

Semi-finals
26 May
Japan	3
Thailand	2
26 May
China	3
South Korea	2

Final
27 May
Japan	3
China	1
Third place
27 May
Thailand	3
South Korea	1

==== Play-offs ====
- Winners advanced to the Quarter-finals.
- Losers transferred to the Classification round (R9–12).

Date	Time		Score		Set 1	Set 2	Set 3	Set 4	Set 5	Total	Report
23 May	11:30	Chinese Taipei	3–0	New Zealand	25–9	25–8	25–13			75–30	Report
23 May	14:00	Hong Kong	0–3	Kazakhstan	21–25	22–25	12–25			55–75	Report
23 May	16:30	Australia	0–3	India	23–25	18–25	21–25			62–75	Report
23 May	19:00	Iran	3–1	Malaysia	25–27	25–20	25–22	25–21		100–90	Report

==== Quarter-finals ====
- Winners advanced to the Semi-finals and World Championship.
- Losers transferred to the Classification round (R5–8).

Date	Time		Score		Set 1	Set 2	Set 3	Set 4	Set 5	Total	Report
24 May	11:30	Japan	3–0	Iran	25–12	25–17	25–16			75–45	Report
24 May	14:00	Thailand	3–2	Chinese Taipei	15–25	25–23	20–25	25–23	15–10	100–106	Report
24 May	16:30	China	3–0	Kazakhstan	25–20	25–10	25–2			75–32	Report
24 May	19:00	South Korea	3–0	India	25–15	25–18	25–14			75–47	Report

==== Semi-finals ====
- Winners advanced to the Finals.
- Losers contested the tournament's Third Place.

Date	Time		Score		Set 1	Set 2	Set 3	Set 4	Set 5	Total	Report
26 May	16:30	Japan	3–2	Thailand	22–25	25–15	23–25	25–16	15–2	110–83	Report
26 May	19:00	China	3–2	South Korea	19–25	25–21	25–27	25–16	15–10	109–99	Report

==== Third place ====
Date	Time		Score		Set 1	Set 2	Set 3	Set 4	Set 5	Total	Report
27 May	16:30	Thailand	3–1	South Korea	25–19	25–17	8–25	25–16		83–77	Report

==== Final ====
Date	Time		Score		Set 1	Set 2	Set 3	Set 4	Set 5	Total	Report
27 May	19:00	Japan	3–1	China	25–17	18–25	25–17	25–19		93–78	Report

== Final standing ==
Rank	Team
1st place, gold medalist(s)	Japan
2nd place, silver medalist(s)	China
3rd place, bronze medalist(s)	Thailand
4	South Korea
5	Chinese Taipei
6	Kazakhstan
7	Iran
8	India
9	Australia
10	New Zealand
11	Malaysia
12	Hong Kong

Qualified for the 2019 Girls' U18 World Championship and 2021 Girls' U18 World Championship

2018 Asian U17 champions

Japan
8th title

12–girl roster
Aoi An Furukawa, Ayana Funane, Nishikawa Yoshino, Mika Yoshitake, Manami Koyama, Yoshie Kawakami, Mado Kashimura, Vivian Chidinma Taira, Nana Sakakibara, Aimi Okawa, Moka Otomo, Mana Nishizaki
Head coach
Daichi Saegusa

== Awards ==
- Most valuable player

(Japan) Nishikawa Yoshino

- Best outside spikers

(Japan) Nishikawa Yoshino
(China) Zhou Yetong

- Best setter

(Thailand) Supatcha Kamtalaksa

- Best opposite spiker

(Japan) Manami Koyama

- Best middle blocker

(China) Wu Mengjie
(Japan) Madoka Kashimura

- Best libero

(Thailand) Jidapa Nahuanong

== See also ==
- 2018 Southeast Asian Girls' U17 Volleyball Championship
