= 2017 Asian Girls' U18 Volleyball Championship =

2017 Asian Girls' U18 Championship
Tournament details
- Host country: China
- Dates: 5–13 March
- Teams: 11
- Venue: 1 (in 1 host city)

Final positions
- Champions: Japan (7th title)

Tournament awards
- MVP: (Japan) Yuki Nishikawa

The 2017 Asian Girls' U18 Volleyball Championship was the eleventh edition of the Women's Asian U18 Volleyball Championship, a biennial international volleyball tournament organised by the Asian Volleyball Confederation (AVC), that year with the Chinese Volleyball Association (CVA). It was held in Chongqing, China from 5 to 13 March 2017. The tournament served as the Asian qualifiers for the 2017 FIVB Volleyball Girls' U18 World Championship held in Argentina, with the top four teams qualifying.

The matches were played in only one stadium in Chongqing, the Chongqing No. 8 Secondary School Gymnasium. It was the second time that China and the first time that Chongqing hosted the tournament. As hosts, China automatically participated in the tournament, along with the remaining 10 teams (after Kazakhstan withdrew)..

Japan won the tournament with a 3–0 final win over China. Both finalists and the semifinalists, South Korea and Thailand, qualified for the World Championship.

== Participating teams ==
Central Asia (CAZA)	East Asia (EAZA)	Oceania (OZA)	Southeast Asia (SEAZA)	West Asia (WAZA)
Iran; ~~Kazakhstan~~; Uzbekistan	China (host); Chinese Taipei; Hong Kong; Japan; South Korea	Australia; New Zealand; Samoa	Thailand	

== Pools composition ==
The teams were seeded based on their final ranking at the 2014 Asian Girls' U17 Volleyball Championship. The host country and the top 7 ranked teams were seeded through the Serpentine system. The 7 remaining teams were drawn in Bangkok, Thailand.

Ranking from the previous edition was shown in brackets, except the host (who ranked 3rd) and the teams who did not participate, which were denoted by (-).

Pool A	Pool B	Pool C	Pool D
China (host)	Japan (1)	Thailand (2)	South Korea (4)
Hong Kong (8)	New Zealand (7)	~~Kazakhstan (6)~~	Chinese Taipei (5)
Iran (9)	Samoa (-)	Australia (13)	Uzbekistan (-)

- Kazakhstan withdrew after the draw.

== Pool standing procedure ==
1. Number of matches won
2. Match points
3. Sets ratio
4. Points ratio
5. If the tie continues as per the point ratio between two teams, the priority will be given to the team which won the last match between them. When the tie in points ratio is between three or more teams, a new classification of these teams in the terms of points 1, 2 and 3 will be made taking into consideration only the matches in which they were opposed to each other.

Match won 3–0 or 3–1: 3 match points for the winner, 0 match points for the loser
Match won 3–2: 2 match points for the winner, 1 match point for the loser

== Preliminary round ==
- All times are China Standard Time (UTC+08:00)

=== Pool A ===
Pos	Team	Pld	W	L	Pts	SW	SL	SR	SPW	SPL	SPR	Qualification
1	China	2	2	0	6	6	0	MAX	150	64	2.344	Pool E
2	Hong Kong	2	1	1	3	3	4	0.750	130	162	0.802	Pool E
3	Iran	2	0	2	0	1	6	0.167	119	173	0.688	9th-11th place

Date	Time		Score		Set 1	Set 2	Set 3	Set 4	Set 5	Total	Report
5 Mar	16:30	Iran	0–3	China	14–25	6–25	12–25			32–75	Report
6 Mar	19:00	Hong Kong	3–1	Iran	23–25	25–23	25–18	25–21		98–87	Report
7 Mar	16:30	China	3–0	Hong Kong	25–14	25–7	25–11			75–32	Report

=== Pool B ===
Pos	Team	Pld	W	L	Pts	SW	SL	SR	SPW	SPL	SPR	Qualification
1	Japan	2	2	0	6	6	0	MAX	150	42	3.571	Pool F
2	New Zealand	2	1	1	3	3	3	1.000	96	130	0.738	Pool F
3	Samoa	2	0	2	0	0	6	0.000	76	150	0.507	9th-11th place

Date	Time		Score		Set 1	Set 2	Set 3	Set 4	Set 5	Total	Report
5 Mar	14:00	Japan	3–0	New Zealand	25–7	25–5	25–9			75–21	Report
6 Mar	14:00	Samoa	0–3	Japan	3–25	15–25	3–25			21–75	Report
7 Mar	11:30	New Zealand	3–0	Samoa	25–20	25–18	25–17			75–55	Report

=== Pool C ===
Pos	Team	Pld	W	L	Pts	SW	SL	SR	SPW	SPL	SPR	Qualification
1	Thailand	1	1	0	3	3	0	MAX	75	45	1.667	Pool E
2	Australia	1	0	1	0	0	3	0.000	45	75	0.600	Pool E

Date	Time		Score		Set 1	Set 2	Set 3	Set 4	Set 5	Total	Report
7 Mar	14:00	Thailand	3–0	Australia	25–14	25–20	25–11			75–45	Report

=== Pool D ===
Pos	Team	Pld	W	L	Pts	SW	SL	SR	SPW	SPL	SPR	Qualification
1	South Korea	2	2	0	6	6	0	MAX	154	93	1.656	Pool F
2	Chinese Taipei	2	1	1	3	3	3	1.000	138	125	1.104	Pool F
3	Uzbekistan	2	0	2	0	0	6	0.000	76	150	0.507	9th-11th place

Date	Time		Score		Set 1	Set 2	Set 3	Set 4	Set 5	Total	Report
5 Mar	19:00	South Korea	3–0	Uzbekistan	25–15	25–8	25–7			75–30	Report
6 Mar	16:30	Chinese Taipei	0–3	South Korea	19–25	17–25	27–29			63–79	Report
7 Mar	19:00	Uzbekistan	0–3	Chinese Taipei	18–25	10–25	18–25			46–75	Report

== Second round ==
- The results and the points of the matches between the same teams that were already played during the preliminary round were taken into account for the classification round.
- All times are China Standard Time (UTC+08:00)

=== Pool E ===
Pos	Team	Pld	W	L	Pts	SW	SL	SR	SPW	SPL	SPR	Qualification
1	China	3	3	0	8	9	2	4.500	255	163	1.564	Quarterfinals
2	Thailand	3	2	1	7	8	3	2.667	241	202	1.193	Quarterfinals
3	Hong Kong	3	1	2	3	3	7	0.429	174	238	0.731	Quarterfinals
4	Australia	3	0	3	0	1	9	0.111	173	240	0.721	Quarterfinals

Date	Time		Score		Set 1	Set 2	Set 3	Set 4	Set 5	Total	Report
8 Mar	14:00	Thailand	3–0	Hong Kong	25–12	25–21	25–19			75–52	Report
8 Mar	16:30	China	3–0	Australia	25–10	25–11	25–19			75–40	Report
9 Mar	14:00	China	3–2	Thailand	25–14	22–25	18–25	25–14	15–13	105–91	Report
9 Mar	19:00	Hong Kong	3–1	Australia	14–25	25–21	25–18	26–24		90–88	Report

=== Pool F ===
Pos	Team	Pld	W	L	Pts	SW	SL	SR	SPW	SPL	SPR	Qualification
1	Japan	3	3	0	9	9	0	MAX	225	107	2.103	Quarterfinals
2	South Korea	3	2	1	6	6	3	2.000	195	176	1.108	Quarterfinals
3	Chinese Taipei	3	1	2	3	3	6	0.500	183	192	0.953	Quarterfinals
4	New Zealand	3	0	3	0	0	9	0.000	97	225	0.431	Quarterfinals

Date	Time		Score		Set 1	Set 2	Set 3	Set 4	Set 5	Total	Report
8 Mar	11:30	Japan	3–0	Chinese Taipei	25–14	25–14	25–17			75–45	Report
8 Mar	19:00	South Korea	3–0	New Zealand	25–9	25–17	25–12			75–38	Report
9 Mar	11:30	New Zealand	0–3	Chinese Taipei	16–25	12–25	10–25			38–75	Report
9 Mar	16:30	Japan	3–0	South Korea	25–6	25–14	25–21			75–41	Report

== 9-11th place ==
Pos	Team	Pld	W	L	Pts	SW	SL	SR	SPW	SPL	SPR
1	Iran	2	2	0	5	6	2	3.000	178	153	1.163
2	Uzbekistan	2	1	1	4	5	3	1.667	179	149	1.201
3	Samoa	2	0	2	0	0	6	0.000	95	150	0.633

Date	Time		Score		Set 1	Set 2	Set 3	Set 4	Set 5	Total	Report
8 Mar	09:00	Iran	3–2	Uzbekistan	17–25	25–21	21–25	25–22	15–11	103–104	Report
10 Mar	10:00	Iran	3–0	Samoa	25–17	25–17	25–15			75–49	Report
11 Mar	09:00	Samoa	0–3	Uzbekistan	14–25	11–25	21–25			46–75	Report

== Final round ==
Quarterfinals
11 March - Chongqing
China	3
New Zealand	0
11 March - Chongqing
South Korea	3
Hong Kong	0
11 March - Chongqing
Japan	3
Australia	0
11 March - Chongqing
Thailand	3
Chinese Taipei	0

Semifinals
12 March - Chongqing
China	3
South Korea	2
12 March - Chongqing
Japan	3
Thailand	0

Final
13 March - Chongqing
China	0
Japan	3
3rd place
13 March - Chongqing
South Korea	3
Thailand	0

5th–8th places
12 March - Chongqing
New Zealand	1
Hong Kong	3
12 March - Chongqing
Australia	0
Chinese Taipei	3

5th place
13 March - Chongqing
Hong Kong	1
Chinese Taipei	3
7th place
13 March - Chongqing
New Zealand	0
Australia	3

=== Quarterfinals ===
Date	Time		Score		Set 1	Set 2	Set 3	Set 4	Set 5	Total	Report
11 Mar	11:30	Japan	3–0	Australia	25–15	25–11	25–13			75–39	Report
11 Mar	14:00	Thailand	3–0	Chinese Taipei	26–24	25–21	25–23			76–68	Report
11 Mar	16:30	China	3–0	New Zealand	25–13	25–7	25–6			75–26	Report
11 Mar	19:00	South Korea	3–0	Hong Kong	25–18	25–7	25–13			75–38	Report

=== 5th–8th semifinals ===
Date	Time		Score		Set 1	Set 2	Set 3	Set 4	Set 5	Total	Report
12 Mar	11:30	Australia	0–3	Chinese Taipei	14–25	15–25	17–25			46–75	Report
12 Mar	14:00	New Zealand	1–3	Hong Kong	25–23	22–25	18–25	14–25		79–98	Report

=== Semifinals ===
Date	Time		Score		Set 1	Set 2	Set 3	Set 4	Set 5	Total	Report
12 Mar	16:30	China	3–2	South Korea	19–25	14–25	25–23	25–19	15–13	98–105	Report
12 Mar	19:00	Japan	3–0	Thailand	25–8	25–12	25–19			75–39	Report

=== 7th place ===
Date	Time		Score		Set 1	Set 2	Set 3	Set 4	Set 5	Total	Report
13 Mar	11:30	New Zealand	0–3	Australia	20–25	19–25	18–25			57–75	Report

=== 5th place ===
Date	Time		Score		Set 1	Set 2	Set 3	Set 4	Set 5	Total	Report
13 Mar	14:00	Hong Kong	1–3	Chinese Taipei	15–25	25–16	22–25	23–25		85–91	Report

=== 3rd place ===
Date	Time		Score		Set 1	Set 2	Set 3	Set 4	Set 5	Total	Report
13 Mar	16:30	South Korea	3–0	Thailand	25–17	25–17	28–26			78–60	Report

=== Final ===
Date	Time		Score		Set 1	Set 2	Set 3	Set 4	Set 5	Total	Report
13 Mar	19:00	China	0–3	Japan	16–25	9–25	30–32			55–82	Report

== Final standing ==
Rank	Team
1st place, gold medalist(s)	Japan
2nd place, silver medalist(s)	China
3rd place, bronze medalist(s)	South Korea
4	Thailand
5	Chinese Taipei
6	Hong Kong
7	Australia
8	New Zealand
9	Iran
10	Uzbekistan
11	Samoa

Qualified for the 2017 FIVB Girls' U18 World Championship

2017 Asian Youth Girls champions

Japan
Seventh title

Team Roster
Tsukasa Nakagawa, Shuri Kurata, Rena Mizusugi, Mayu Ishikawa (c), Haruna Soga, Nichika Yamada, Kotomi Osaki, Yuki Nishikawa, Yuri Takawanagi, Ayaka Araki, Rui Nonaka, Ameze Miyabe
Head Coach: Daichi Saegusa

== Awards ==
- Most valuable player
  (Japan) Yuki Nishikawa
- Best Outside Hitters
  (South Korea) Park Hye-min
  (Japan) Yuki Nishikawa
- Best setter
  (China) Zhang Zihan
- Best Middle Blockers
  (China) Mao Junyi
  (South Korea) Lee Ju-ah
- Best libero
  (Japan) Mizusugi Rena
- Best Opposite
  (China) Sun Xiaoxuan
