= Japan women's national under-19 volleyball team =

Japan
- Association: Japan Volleyball Association
- Confederation: AVC

Uniforms
Home	Away	Third

Youth Olympic Games
- Appearances: 1 (First in 2010)
- Best result: 4th place : (2010)

FIVB U19 World Championship
- Appearances: 13 (First in 1989)
- Best result: (gold) Gold : (1995, 1999)

Asian U18 Championship
- Appearances: 10 (First in 1997)
- Best result: (gold) Gold : (1997, 2007, 2008, 2010, 2012, 2014, 2017).

The Japan women's national under-18 volleyball team represents Japan in women's under-18 volleyball events, it is controlled and managed by the Japanese Volleyball Association that is a member of Asian volleyball body Asian Volleyball Confederation (AVC) and the international volleyball body government the Fédération Internationale de Volleyball (FIVB).

== Results ==
=== Summer Youth Olympics ===
Champions Runners up Third place Fourth place

Youth Olympic Games
Year	Round	Position	Pld	W	L	SW	SL	Squad
(Singapore) 2010	Semifinals	4th place						Squad
(China) 2014	No Volleyball Event							
(Argentina) 2018	No Volleyball Event							
Total	0 Titles	1/1						

=== FIVB U19 World Championship ===
Champions Runners up Third place Fourth place

FIVB U19 World Championship
Year	Round	Position	Pld	W	L	SW	SL	Squad
(Brazil) 1989	Semifinals	Third place						Squad
(Portugal) 1991	Semifinals	4th place						Squad
(Czechoslovakia) 1993	Final	Runners-Up						Squad
(France) 1995	Final	1st place						Squad
(Thailand) 1997		13th place						Squad
(Portugal) 1999	Final	1st place						Squad
(Croatia) 2001		5th place						Squad
(Poland) 2003	Didn't Qualify							
(Macau) 2005	Didn't Qualify							
(Mexico) 2007		7th place						Squad
(Thailand) 2009		5th place						Squad
(Turkey) 2011		7th place						Squad
(Thailand) 2013		5th place						Squad
(Peru) 2015		9th place						Squad
(Argentina) 2017		5th place						Squad
(Egypt) 2019		5th place						Squad
(Mexico) 2021	withdrew							
(Croatia) / (Hungary) 2023		4th place						Squad
Total	2 Titles	15/18						

== Team ==
=== Current squad ===
The following is the Japanese roster in the 2017 FIVB Girls' U18 World Championship.

Head coach: Daichi Saegusa

No.	Name	Date of birth	Height	Weight	Spike	Block	2017 club
1	Tsukasa Nakagawa	13 August 2000	1.59 m (5 ft 3 in)	57 kg (126 lb)	265 cm (104 in)	255 cm (100 in)	(Japan) Kinrankai High School
2	Shuri Kurata (C)	22 November 2000	1.69 m (5 ft 7 in)	57 kg (126 lb)	281 cm (111 in)	270 cm (110 in)	(Japan) Sundai Gakuen High School
3	Rena Mizusugi	6 April 2000	1.61 m (5 ft 3 in)	47 kg (104 lb)	265 cm (104 in)	255 cm (100 in)	(Japan) Kinrankai High School
4	Mao Ito	23 June 2000	1.77 m (5 ft 10 in)	71 kg (157 lb)	292 cm (115 in)	278 cm (109 in)	(Japan) Fujimi High School
5	Haruna Soga	25 March 2001	1.72 m (5 ft 8 in)	62 kg (137 lb)	304 cm (120 in)	293 cm (115 in)	(Japan) Kinrankai High School
6	Nichika Yamada	24 February 2000	1.83 m (6 ft 0 in)	70 kg (150 lb)	300 cm (120 in)	290 cm (110 in)	(Japan) Toyohashi Chuo High School
7	Megumi Nakazawa	28 May 2000	1.71 m (5 ft 7 in)	62 kg (137 lb)	288 cm (113 in)	280 cm (110 in)	(Japan) Kinrankai High School
8	Yuki Nishikawa	4 September 2000	1.78 m (5 ft 10 in)	59 kg (130 lb)	290 cm (110 in)	275 cm (108 in)	(Japan) Kinrankai High School
9	Yuri Takayanagi	19 April 2000	1.77 m (5 ft 10 in)	69 kg (152 lb)	289 cm (114 in)	280 cm (110 in)	(Japan) Osaka Kokusai Takii HS
10	Ayaka Araki	2 September 2001	1.84 m (6 ft 0 in)	74 kg (163 lb)	295 cm (116 in)	285 cm (112 in)	(Japan) Higashi Kyushu Ryukoku HS
11	Rui Nonaka	3 August 2001	1.76 m (5 ft 9 in)	60 kg (130 lb)	295 cm (116 in)	279 cm (110 in)	(Japan) Akita Kita High School
12	Ameze Miyabe	12 October 2001	1.73 m (5 ft 8 in)	54 kg (119 lb)	304 cm (120 in)	280 cm (110 in)	(Japan) Kinrankai High School
