= Thailand Volleyball Association =

Governing body of volleyball in Thailand

- สมาคมกีฬาวอลเลย์บอลแห่งประเทศไทย
- Sport: Volleyball
- Jurisdiction: Thailand
- Abbreviation: TVA
- Founded: 1959
- Affiliation: FIVB
- Regional affiliation: AVC
- Headquarters: Bangkok

Official website
- web.volleyball.or.th
- (Thailand)

The Thailand Volleyball Association (TVA; Thai: สมาคมกีฬาวอลเลย์บอลแห่งประเทศไทย) is the national regulating body for volleyball in Thailand and a member of the International Federation of Volleyball. The TVA was established on February 11, 1959.
