= 2014 Asian Girls' U17 Volleyball Championship =

Tournament details
- Host country: Thailand
- Dates: 11–19 October
- Teams: 13
- Venue: 1 (in 1 host city)

Final positions
- Champions: Japan (6th title)

Tournament awards
- MVP: (Japan) Airi Miyabe

The 2014 Asian Girls' U17 Volleyball Championship was a volleyball competition held in the MCC Hall (Convention Center at the Mall), Nakhon Ratchasima Shopping Mall, Thailand, from 11 to 19 October 2014. The game was part of the Asian Youth Volleyball Championship.

== Pools composition ==
The teams were seeded based on their final ranking at the 2012 Asian Girls' Volleyball Championship.

The AVC released the 2014 Asian Girls' Volleyball Championship Squads List on 11 October 2014.

Pool A	Pool B	Pool C	Pool D
Thailand (Host & 5th); Hong Kong (8th); New Zealand	Japan (1st); Kazakhstan (7th); Vietnam	China (2nd); India (6th); Australia; Philippines	Chinese Taipei (3rd); South Korea (4th); ~~Turkmenistan~~ * Iran

* Withdrew

== Preliminary round ==
=== Pool A ===
Pos	Team	Pld	W	L	Pts	SW	SL	SR	SPW	SPL	SPR	Qualification
1	Thailand	2	2	0	6	6	0	MAX	150	80	1.875	Pool E
2	New Zealand	2	1	1	2	3	5	0.600	148	175	0.846	Pool E
3	Hong Kong	2	0	2	1	2	6	0.333	139	182	0.764	Pool G

Date	Time		Score		Set 1	Set 2	Set 3	Set 4	Set 5	Total	Report
11 Oct	16:30	Thailand	3–0	Hong Kong	25–12	25–15	25–12			75–39	Report
12 Oct	18:00	New Zealand	0–3	Thailand	10–25	17–25	14–25			41–75	Report
13 Oct	14:00	Hong Kong	2–3	New Zealand	25–20	24–26	25–21	20–25	6–15	100–107	Report

=== Pool B ===
Pos	Team	Pld	W	L	Pts	SW	SL	SR	SPW	SPL	SPR	Qualification
1	Japan	2	2	0	6	6	0	MAX	150	88	1.705	Pool F
2	Kazakhstan	2	0	2	0	1	6	0.167	105	174	0.603	Pool F
3	Vietnam	2	1	1	3	3	4	0.750	140	133	1.053	Pool H

Date	Time		Score		Set 1	Set 2	Set 3	Set 4	Set 5	Total	Report
11 Oct	12:00	Kazakhstan	0–3	Japan	19–25	11–25	17–25			47–75	Report
12 Oct	10:00	Vietnam	3–1	Kazakhstan	25–9	25–8	24–26	25–15		99–58	Report
13 Oct	18:00	Japan	3–0	Vietnam	25–16	25–16	25–9			75–41	Report

=== Pool C ===
Pos	Team	Pld	W	L	Pts	SW	SL	SR	SPW	SPL	SPR	Qualification
1	China	3	3	0	9	9	0	MAX	225	112	2.009	Pool E
2	Philippines	3	2	1	5	6	6	1.000	247	260	0.950	Pool E
3	India	3	1	2	2	4	8	0.500	220	261	0.843	Pool G
4	Australia	3	0	3	2	4	9	0.444	235	294	0.799	Pool G

Date	Time		Score		Set 1	Set 2	Set 3	Set 4	Set 5	Total	Report
11 Oct	10:00	Australia	2–3	Philippines	26–24	22–25	25–21	21–25	13–15	107–110	Report
11 Oct	14:00	China	3–0	India	25–10	25–8	25–15			75–33	Report
12 Oct	12:00	Philippines	3–1	India	19–25	25–11	25–20	25–22		94–78	Report
12 Oct	16:00	Australia	0–3	China	16–25	5–25	15–25			36–75	Report
13 Oct	12:00	India	3–2	Australia	25–17	21–25	23–25	25–15	15–10	109–92	Report
13 Oct	16:00	China	3–0	Philippines	25–15	25–18	25–10			75–43	Report

=== Pool D ===
Pos	Team	Pld	W	L	Pts	SW	SL	SR	SPW	SPL	SPR	Qualification
1	South Korea	2	2	0	6	6	1	6.000	180	132	1.364	Pool F
2	Chinese Taipei	2	1	1	3	4	3	1.333	167	160	1.044	Pool F
3	Iran	2	0	2	0	0	6	0.000	95	150	0.633	Pool H

Date	Time		Score		Set 1	Set 2	Set 3	Set 4	Set 5	Total	Report
11 Oct	18:00	Chinese Taipei	3–0	Iran	25–18	25–19	25–18			75–55	Report
12 Oct	14:00	South Korea	3–1	Chinese Taipei	25–16	32–30	23–25	25–21		105–92	Report
13 Oct	10:00	Iran	0–3	South Korea	10–25	17–25	13–25			40–75	Report

== Classification round ==
- The results and the points of the matches between the same teams that were already played during the preliminary round were taken into account for the classification round.

=== Pool E ===
Pos	Team	Pld	W	L	Pts	SW	SL	SR	SPW	SPL	SPR	Qualification
1	Thailand	3	3	0	8	9	2	4.500	264	182	1.451	Quarterfinals
2	China	3	2	1	7	8	3	2.667	251	182	1.379	Quarterfinals
3	Philippines	3	1	2	3	3	7	0.429	179	205	0.873	Quarterfinals
4	New Zealand	3	0	3	0	1	9	0.111	121	246	0.492	Quarterfinals

Date	Time		Score		Set 1	Set 2	Set 3	Set 4	Set 5	Total	Report
14 Oct	12:00	China	3–0	New Zealand	25–10	25–11	25–4			75–25	Report
14 Oct	18:00	Thailand	3–0	Philippines	25–15	25–12	25–13			75–40	Report
15 Oct	12:00	New Zealand	1–3	Philippines	11–25	25–21	5–25	14–25		55–96	Report
15 Oct	18:00	Thailand	3–2	China	30–28	21–25	23–25	25–14	15–9	114–101	Report

=== Pool F ===
Pos	Team	Pld	W	L	Pts	SW	SL	SR	SPW	SPL	SPR	Qualification
1	Japan	3	3	0	9	9	0	MAX	225	157	1.433	Quarterfinals
2	South Korea	3	2	1	6	6	4	1.500	242	227	1.066	Quarterfinals
3	Chinese Taipei	3	1	2	3	4	7	0.571	239	256	0.934	Quarterfinals
4	Kazakhstan	3	0	3	0	1	9	0.111	183	249	0.735	Quarterfinals

Date	Time		Score		Set 1	Set 2	Set 3	Set 4	Set 5	Total	Report
14 Oct	14:00	Japan	3–0	Chinese Taipei	25–18	25–14	25–16			75–48	Report
14 Oct	16:00	South Korea	3–0	Kazakhstan	25–20	25–23	25–17			75–60	Report
15 Oct	14:00	Kazakhstan	1–3	Chinese Taipei	9–25	18–25	26–24	23–25		76–99	Report
15 Oct	16:00	Japan	3–0	South Korea	25–21	25–20	25–21			75–62	Report

=== Pool G ===
Pos	Team	Pld	W	L	Pts	SW	SL	SR	SPW	SPL	SPR	Qualification
1	Hong Kong	2	2	0	6	6	1	6.000	167	130	1.285	9th place playoff
2	India	2	1	1	2	3	5	0.600	163	171	0.953	11th place playoff
3	Australia	2	0	2	1	3	6	0.500	168	197	0.853	

Date	Time		Score		Set 1	Set 2	Set 3	Set 4	Set 5	Total	Report
14 Oct	10:00	Hong Kong	3–1	Australia	13–25	25–16	25–15	25–20		88–76	Report
16 Oct	14:00	Hong Kong	3–0	India	25–15	29–27	25–12			79–54	Report

=== Pool H ===
Pos	Team	Pld	W	L	Pts	SW	SL	SR	SPW	SPL	SPR	Qualification
1	Iran	1	1	0	3	3	0	MAX	75	0	MAX	9th place playoff
2	Vietnam	1	0	1	0	0	3	0.000	0	75	0.000	11th place playoff

Date	Time		Score		Set 1	Set 2	Set 3	Set 4	Set 5	Total	Report
16 Oct	16:00	Vietnam	3–0	Iran	25–17	25–16	25–21			75–54	Report

== 11th place ==
Date	Time		Score		Set 1	Set 2	Set 3	Set 4	Set 5	Total	Report
17 Oct	10:00	India	3–0	Vietnam	25–0	25–0	25–0			75–0	Report

Vietnam defeated India in straight sets 25-15 25-18 26–24 in the 11th-12th playoff. However, Vietnam still violated the AVC rules and regulations by fielding three players who had competed in the previous edition in Chengdu, China two years earlier. Following the Control Committee's decision, Vietnam lost this match with a 0–25 0–25 0–25 scoreline and finished in 12th position.

== 9th place ==
Date	Time		Score		Set 1	Set 2	Set 3	Set 4	Set 5	Total	Report
18 Oct	10:00	Hong Kong	3–1	Iran	21–25	25–18	25–16	25-19		96–59	Report

== Final round ==
Quarterfinals
17 October – Nakhon Ratchasima
Thailand	3
Kazakhstan	0
17 October – Nakhon Ratchasima
South Korea	3
Philippines	0
17 October – Nakhon Ratchasima
China	3
Chinese Taipei	0
17 October – Nakhon Ratchasima
Japan	3
New Zealand	0

Semifinals
18 October – Nakhon Ratchasima
Thailand	3
South Korea	2
18 October – Nakhon Ratchasima
China	0
Japan	3

Final
19 October – Nakhon Ratchasima
Thailand	1
Japan	3
3rd place
19 October – Nakhon Ratchasima
China	3
South Korea	0

5th–8th places
18 October – Nakhon Ratchasima
Kazakhstan	3
Philippines	2
18 October – Nakhon Ratchasima
Chinese Taipei	3
New Zealand	1

5th place
19 October – Nakhon Ratchasima
Kazakhstan	0
Chinese Taipei	3
7th place
19 October – Nakhon Ratchasima
Philippines	3
New Zealand	0

=== Quarterfinals ===
Date	Time		Score		Set 1	Set 2	Set 3	Set 4	Set 5	Total	Report
17 Oct	12:00	China	3–0	Chinese Taipei	25–12	25–18	25–17			75–47	Report
17 Oct	14:00	Japan	3–0	New Zealand	25–13	25–7	25–5			75–25	Report
17 Oct	16:00	Thailand	3–0	Kazakhstan	25–13	25–15	25–15			75–43	Report
17 Oct	18:00	South Korea	3–0	Philippines	25–15	25–16	25–12			75–43	75–43

=== 5th–8th semifinals ===
Date	Time		Score		Set 1	Set 2	Set 3	Set 4	Set 5	Total	Report
18 Oct	12:00	Chinese Taipei	3–1	New Zealand	25–12	21–25	25–19	25–15		96–71	Report
18 Oct	14:00	Kazakhstan	3–2	Philippines	21–25	25–20	23–25	25–12	15–12	109–94	Report

=== Semifinals ===
Date	Time		Score		Set 1	Set 2	Set 3	Set 4	Set 5	Total	Report
18 Oct	16:00	China	0–3	Japan	21–25	18–25	22–25			61–75	Report
18 Oct	18:00	Thailand	3–2	South Korea	25–22	24–26	27–25	20–25	16–14	112–112	Report

=== 7th place ===
Date	Time		Score		Set 1	Set 2	Set 3	Set 4	Set 5	Total	Report
19 Oct	9:00	Philippines	3–0	New Zealand	25–21	25–15	25–22			75–58	Report

=== 5th place ===
Date	Time		Score		Set 1	Set 2	Set 3	Set 4	Set 5	Total	Report
19 Oct	11:00	Kazakhstan	0–3	Chinese Taipei	18–25	20–25	24–26			62–76	Report

=== 3rd place ===
Date	Time		Score		Set 1	Set 2	Set 3	Set 4	Set 5	Total	Report
19 Oct	13:00	China	3–0	South Korea	25–22	25–15	27–25			77–62	Report

=== Final ===
Date	Time		Score		Set 1	Set 2	Set 3	Set 4	Set 5	Total	Report
19 Oct	16:00	Thailand	1–3	Japan	15–25	23–25	25–18	24–26		87–94	Report

== Final standing ==
Rank	Team
1st place, gold medalist(s)	Japan
2nd place, silver medalist(s)	Thailand
3rd place, bronze medalist(s)	China
4	South Korea
5	Chinese Taipei
6	Kazakhstan
7	Philippines
8	New Zealand
9	Hong Kong
10	Iran
11	India
12	Vietnam
13	Australia

Qualified for the 2015 FIVB Girls' U18 World Championship

2014 Asian Girls' U18 champions

Japan
Sixth title

Team Roster

Marina Takahashi, Shiori Aratani, Airi Miyabe, Manami Mandai, Kanoha Kagamihara, Miharu Yoshioka, Rin Takahashi, Haruka Sekiyama, Shuri Yamaguchi, Miku Shimada, Yaka Yamaguchi, Miyu Nakagawa

Head Coach: Daichi Saegusa

== Awards ==
- Most valuable player
  (Japan) Airi Miyabe
- Best Outside Hitters
  (China) Li Yingying
  (Thailand) Chatchu-on Moksri
- Best setter
  (Thailand) Natthanicha Jaisaen
- Best Middle Blockers
  (Japan) Miyu Nakagawa
- Best libero
  (Japan) Kanoha Kagamihara
- Best Opposite
  (Thailand) Pimpichaya Kokram
