= 2012 Asian Youth Girls' Volleyball Championship =

Volleyball tournament in Chengdu, China

Tournament details
- Host country: China
- Dates: 12–20 October
- Teams: 13
- Venue: 1 (in 1 host city)

Final positions
- Champions: Japan (5th title)

Tournament awards
- MVP: (Japan) Sarina Koga

The 2012 Asian Youth Girls' Volleyball Championship was held in Shuangliu County, Chengdu, China. Japan won the tournament and Sarina Koga was selected the Most Valuable Player.

== Pools composition ==
The teams were seeded based on their final ranking at the 2010 Asian Youth Girls Volleyball Championship.

Pool A	Pool B	Pool C	Pool D
China (Host & 2nd); ~~Malaysia (8th)~~ * Hong Kong; Vietnam	Japan (1st); Australia (7th); Iran; India	Thailand (3rd); Kazakhstan (6th); Mongolia	South Korea (4th); Chinese Taipei (5th); Sri Lanka

* Withdrew

== Preliminary round ==
=== Pool A ===
Pos	Team	Pld	W	L	Pts	SW	SL	SR	SPW	SPL	SPR	Qualification
1	China	2	2	0	6	6	0	MAX	150	45	3.333	Pool E
2	Hong Kong	2	1	1	2	3	5	0.600	131	171	0.766	Pool E
3	Vietnam	2	0	2	1	2	6	0.333	111	176	0.631	Pool G

Date	Time		Score		Set 1	Set 2	Set 3	Set 4	Set 5	Total	Report
12 Oct	13:00	Vietnam	2–3	Hong Kong	17–25	19–25	25–23	25–13	10–15	96–101	Report
13 Oct	19:00	China	3–0	Vietnam	25–4	25–6	25–5			75–15	Report
14 Oct	19:00	Hong Kong	0–3	China	6–25	12–25	12–25			30–75	Report

=== Pool B ===
Pos	Team	Pld	W	L	Pts	SW	SL	SR	SPW	SPL	SPR	Qualification
1	Japan	3	3	0	9	9	0	MAX	225	86	2.616	Pool F
2	India	3	2	1	6	6	4	1.500	195	220	0.886	Pool F
3	Iran	3	1	2	3	4	6	0.667	193	219	0.881	Pool H
4	Australia	3	0	3	0	0	9	0.000	137	225	0.609	Pool H

Date	Time		Score		Set 1	Set 2	Set 3	Set 4	Set 5	Total	Report
12 Oct	15:00	Australia	0–3	Iran	16–25	14–25	17–25			47–75	Report
12 Oct	17:00	India	0–3	Japan	7–25	9–25	7–25			23–75	Report
13 Oct	10:00	Iran	0–3	Japan	9–25	13–25	10–25			32–75	Report
13 Oct	15:00	Australia	0–3	India	16–25	21–25	22–25			59–75	Report
14 Oct	13:00	India	3–1	Iran	25–22	25–17	22–25	25–22		97–86	Report
14 Oct	15:00	Japan	3–0	Australia	25–7	25–12	25–12			75–31	Report

=== Pool C ===
Pos	Team	Pld	W	L	Pts	SW	SL	SR	SPW	SPL	SPR	Qualification
1	Thailand	2	2	0	6	6	0	MAX	150	67	2.239	Pool E
2	Kazakhstan	2	1	1	3	3	4	0.750	130	157	0.828	Pool E
3	Mongolia	2	0	2	0	1	6	0.167	116	172	0.674	Pool G

Date	Time		Score		Set 1	Set 2	Set 3	Set 4	Set 5	Total	Report
12 Oct	19:00	Kazakhstan	0–3	Thailand	11–25	9–25	13–25			33–75	Report
13 Oct	17:00	Mongolia	1–3	Kazakhstan	22–25	15–25	25–22	20–25		82–97	Report
14 Oct	17:00	Thailand	3–0	Mongolia	25–15	25–12	25–7			75–34	Report

=== Pool D ===
Pos	Team	Pld	W	L	Pts	SW	SL	SR	SPW	SPL	SPR	Qualification
1	Chinese Taipei	2	2	0	6	6	1	6.000	172	102	1.686	Pool F
2	South Korea	2	1	1	3	4	3	1.333	155	119	1.303	Pool F
3	Sri Lanka	2	0	2	0	0	6	0.000	44	150	0.293	Pool H

Date	Time		Score		Set 1	Set 2	Set 3	Set 4	Set 5	Total	Report
12 Oct	10:00	Chinese Taipei	3–0	Sri Lanka	25–2	25–6	25–14			75–22	Report
13 Oct	13:00	South Korea	1–3	Chinese Taipei	25–22	17–25	20–25	18–25		80–97	Report
14 Oct	10:00	Sri Lanka	0–3	South Korea	6–25	7–25	9–25			22–75	Report

== Classification round ==
- The results and the points of the matches between the same teams that were already played during the preliminary round were taken into account for the classification round.

=== Pool E ===
Pos	Team	Pld	W	L	Pts	SW	SL	SR	SPW	SPL	SPR	Qualification
1	China	3	3	0	9	9	0	MAX	225	101	2.228	Quarterfinals
2	Thailand	3	2	1	6	6	3	2.000	195	154	1.266	Quarterfinals
3	Kazakhstan	3	1	2	2	3	8	0.375	161	242	0.665	Quarterfinals
4	Hong Kong	3	0	3	1	2	9	0.222	168	252	0.667	Quarterfinals

Date	Time		Score		Set 1	Set 2	Set 3	Set 4	Set 5	Total	Report
15 Oct	16:00	Thailand	3–0	Hong Kong	25–15	25–15	25–16			75–46	Report
15 Oct	20:00	China	3–0	Kazakhstan	25–11	25–10	25–5			75–26	Report
16 Oct	13:00	Hong Kong	2–3	Kazakhstan	25–15	16–25	25–22	17–25	9–15	92–102	Report
16 Oct	19:00	China	3–0	Thailand	25–17	25–13	25–15			75–45	Report

=== Pool F ===
Pos	Team	Pld	W	L	Pts	SW	SL	SR	SPW	SPL	SPR	Qualification
1	Japan	3	3	0	9	9	0	MAX	225	130	1.731	Quarterfinals
2	Chinese Taipei	3	2	1	6	6	4	1.500	232	191	1.215	Quarterfinals
3	South Korea	3	1	2	3	4	6	0.667	202	202	1.000	Quarterfinals
4	India	3	0	3	0	0	9	0.000	89	225	0.396	Quarterfinals

Date	Time		Score		Set 1	Set 2	Set 3	Set 4	Set 5	Total	Report
15 Oct	14:00	Chinese Taipei	3–0	India	25–11	25–12	25–13			75–36	Report
15 Oct	18:00	Japan	3–0	South Korea	25–14	25–17	25–16			75–47	Report
16 Oct	15:00	Japan	3–0	Chinese Taipei	25–22	25–17	25–21			75–60	Report
16 Oct	17:00	India	0–3	South Korea	11–25	8–25	11–25			30–75	Report

=== Pool G ===
Pos	Team	Pld	W	L	Pts	SW	SL	SR	SPW	SPL	SPR	Qualification
1	Vietnam	1	1	0	3	3	0	MAX	75	38	1.974	9th–12th place
2	Mongolia	1	0	1	0	0	3	0.000	38	75	0.507	9th–12th place

Date	Time		Score		Set 1	Set 2	Set 3	Set 4	Set 5	Total	Report
15 Oct	10:00	Vietnam	3–0	Mongolia	25–16	25–14	25–8			75–38	Report

=== Pool H ===
Pos	Team	Pld	W	L	Pts	SW	SL	SR	SPW	SPL	SPR	Qualification
1	Iran	2	2	0	6	6	0	MAX	150	111	1.351	9th–12th place
2	Australia	2	1	1	3	3	4	0.750	140	169	0.828	9th–12th place
3	Sri Lanka	2	0	2	0	1	6	0.167	158	168	0.940	

Date	Time		Score		Set 1	Set 2	Set 3	Set 4	Set 5	Total	Report
15 Oct	12:00	Iran	3–0	Sri Lanka	25–21	25–22	25–21			75–64	Report
16 Oct	10:00	Australia	3–1	Sri Lanka	16–25	25–21	26–24	26–24		93–94	Report

== Classification 9th–12th ==
9th–12th places
17 October – Chengdu
Vietnam	3
Australia	0
17 October – Chengdu
Iran	3
Mongolia	1

9th place
19 October – Chengdu
Vietnam	3
Iran	0
11th place
19 October – Chengdu
Australia	3
Mongolia	2

=== Semifinals ===
Date	Time		Score		Set 1	Set 2	Set 3	Set 4	Set 5	Total	Report
17 Oct	10:00	Vietnam	3–0	Australia	25–23	25–13	25–13			75–49	Report
17 Oct	13:00	Iran	3–1	Mongolia	25–23	25–23	17–25	25–22		92–93	Report

=== 11th place ===
Date	Time		Score		Set 1	Set 2	Set 3	Set 4	Set 5	Total	Report
19 Oct	10:00	Australia	3–2	Mongolia	25–21	17–25	25–22	16–25	18–16	101–109	Report

=== 9th place ===
Date	Time		Score		Set 1	Set 2	Set 3	Set 4	Set 5	Total	Report
19 Oct	12:00	Vietnam	3–0	Iran	25–23	26–24	25–20			76–67	Report

== Final round ==
Quarterfinals
18 October – Chengdu
Chinese Taipei	3
Kazakhstan	0
18 October – Chengdu
China	3
India	0
18 October – Chengdu
Japan	3
Hong Kong	0
18 October – Chengdu
Thailand	2
South Korea	3

Semifinals
19 October – Chengdu
Chinese Taipei	0
China	3
19 October – Chengdu
Japan	3
South Korea	0

Final
20 October – Chengdu
China	1
Japan	3
3rd place
20 October – Chengdu
Chinese Taipei	3
South Korea	0

5th–8th places
19 October – Chengdu
Kazakhstan	1
India	3
19 October – Chengdu
Hong Kong	0
Thailand	3

5th place
20 October – Chengdu
India	0
Thailand	3
7th place
20 October – Chengdu
Kazakhstan	3
Hong Kong	1

=== Quarterfinals ===
Date	Time		Score		Set 1	Set 2	Set 3	Set 4	Set 5	Total	Report
18 Oct	10:00	Chinese Taipei	3–0	Kazakhstan	25–9	25–5	25–13			75–27	Report
18 Oct	13:00	Japan	3–0	Hong Kong	25–6	25–7	25–11			75–24	Report
18 Oct	15:00	Thailand	2–3	South Korea	25–10	20–25	19–25	25–13	11–15	100–88	Report
18 Oct	17:00	China	3–0	India	25–7	25–6	25–9			75–22	Report

=== 5th–8th semifinals ===
Date	Time		Score		Set 1	Set 2	Set 3	Set 4	Set 5	Total	Report
19 Oct	14:00	Kazakhstan	1–3	India	25–19	21–25	15–25	24–26		85–95	Report
19 Oct	16:00	Hong Kong	0–3	Thailand	9–25	8–25	19–25			36–75	Report

=== Semifinals ===
Date	Time		Score		Set 1	Set 2	Set 3	Set 4	Set 5	Total	Report
19 Oct	18:00	Chinese Taipei	0–3	China	14–25	19–25	12–25			45–75	Report
19 Oct	20:00	Japan	3–0	South Korea	26–24	25–13	25–17			76–54	Report

=== 7th place ===
Date	Time		Score		Set 1	Set 2	Set 3	Set 4	Set 5	Total	Report
20 Oct	10:00	Kazakhstan	3–1	Hong Kong	25–18	25–19	22–25	25–18		97–80	Report

=== 5th place ===
Date	Time		Score		Set 1	Set 2	Set 3	Set 4	Set 5	Total	Report
20 Oct	13:00	India	0–3	Thailand	16–25	17–25	18–25			51–75	Report

=== 3rd place ===
Date	Time		Score		Set 1	Set 2	Set 3	Set 4	Set 5	Total	Report
20 Oct	15:00	Chinese Taipei	3–0	South Korea	26–24	26–24	25–17			77–65	Report

=== Final ===
Date	Time		Score		Set 1	Set 2	Set 3	Set 4	Set 5	Total	Report
20 Oct	17:00	China	1–3	Japan	19–25	24–26	25–23	18–25		86–99	Report

== Final standing ==
Rank	Team
1st place, gold medalist(s)	Japan
2nd place, silver medalist(s)	China
3rd place, bronze medalist(s)	Chinese Taipei
4	South Korea
5	Thailand
6	India
7	Kazakhstan
8	Hong Kong
9	Vietnam
10	Iran
11	Australia
12	Mongolia
13	Sri Lanka

Qualified for the 2013 FIVB Girls Youth World Championship

2012 Asian Youth Girls champions

Japan
Fifth title

Team Roster

Yuki Serizawa, Sarina Koga, Shino Nakata, Yurika Kono, Hinako Hayashi, Nanaka Sakamoto, Misaki Shirai, Yuka Kitsui, Akane Ukishima, Minami Takaso, Airi Tahara, Minori Wada

Head Coach: Ichiro Hanzawa

== Awards ==
- MVP: (Japan) Sarina Koga
- Best scorer: (Japan) Sarina Koga
- Best spiker: (China) Hu Mingyuan
- Best blocker: (China) Yuan Xinyue
- Best server: (Chinese Taipei) Chen Tzu-ya
- Best setter: (Japan) Airi Tahara
- Best libero: (Chinese Taipei) Lin Miao-hua
