= 2003 Asian Youth Girls' Volleyball Championship =

Tournament details
- Host country: Thailand
- Dates: 20–27 April
- Teams: 8
- Venue: 1 (in 1 host city)

Final positions
- Champions: China (3rd title)

Tournament awards
- MVP: (China) Wang Yimei

The 2003 Asian Youth Girls' Volleyball Championship was held at the Weesommai Gymnasium, Sisaket, Thailand from 20 to 27 April 2003.

== Results ==
Pos	Team	Pld	W	L	Pts	SW	SL	SR	SPW	SPL	SPR
1	China	7	7	0	14	21	1	21.000	0	0	—
2	North Korea	7	6	1	13	18	3	6.000	0	0	—
3	Thailand	7	5	2	12	16	8	2.000	0	0	—
4	Chinese Taipei	7	4	3	11	13	0	MAX	0	0	—
5	India	7	3	4	10	0	13	0.000	0	0	—
6	Kazakhstan	7	2	5	9	8	17	0.471	468	549	0.852
7	Australia	7	1	6	8	5	18	0.278	374	512	0.730
8	Philippines	7	0	7	7	0	21	0.000	0	0	—

Date		Score		Set 1	Set 2	Set 3	Set 4	Set 5	Total
20 Apr	Chinese Taipei	0–3	China	21–25	18–25	13–25			52–75
20 Apr	Thailand	3–0	Australia	25–16	26–24	25–12			76–52
20 Apr	Philippines	0–3	India	7–25	9–25	13–25			29–75
20 Apr	Kazakhstan	0–3	North Korea	6–25	8–25	21–25			35–75
21 Apr	North Korea	3–0	Philippines	25–7	25–5	25–3			75–15
21 Apr	China	3–0	Kazakhstan	25–13	25–12	25–13			75–38
21 Apr	Australia	0–3	Chinese Taipei	14–25	20–25	11–25			45–75
21 Apr	India	1–3	Thailand	22–25	24–26	25–18	14–25		85–94
22 Apr	Kazakhstan	3–2	Australia	22–25	25–16	18–25	25–15	15–8	105–89
22 Apr	North Korea	0–3	China						
22 Apr	Chinese Taipei	3–?	India						
22 Apr	Thailand	3–0	Philippines						
23 Apr	Kazakhstan	1–3	India	23–25	25–23	24–26	11–25		83–99
23 Apr	China	3–0	Philippines	25–5	25–3	25–6			75–14
23 Apr	Australia	0–3	North Korea	11–25	8–25	10–25			29–75
23 Apr	Thailand	3–1	Chinese Taipei	25–18	23–25	25–14	25–20		98–77
25 Apr	Philippines	0–3	Chinese Taipei	7–25	8–25	8–25			23–75
25 Apr	North Korea	3–0	India	25–14	25–15	25–11			75–40
25 Apr	China	3–0	Australia	25–16	25–8	25–14			75–38
25 Apr	Kazakhstan	0–3	Thailand	14–25	20–25	15–25			49–75
26 Apr	India	0–3	China	13–25	12–25	16–25			41–75
26 Apr	North Korea	3–0	Thailand	25–19	25–17	25–18			75–54
26 Apr	Australia	3–0	Philippines	25–11	25–13	25–7			75–31
26 Apr	Chinese Taipei	3–1	Kazakhstan	25–15	17–25	27–25	25–18		94–83
27 Apr	India	3–0	Australia	25–10	25–21	25–15			75–46
27 Apr	Philippines	0–3	Kazakhstan	11–25	15–25	16–25			42–75
27 Apr	Thailand	1–3	China	16–25	9–25	25–20	13–25		63–95
27 Apr	Chinese Taipei	0–3	North Korea	11–25	17–25	14–25			42–75

== Final standing ==
Rank	Team
1st place, gold medalist(s)	China
2nd place, silver medalist(s)	North Korea
3rd place, bronze medalist(s)	Thailand
4	Chinese Taipei
5	India
6	Kazakhstan
7	Australia
8	Philippines

Qualified for the 2003 FIVB Girls Youth Volleyball World Championship

2003 Asian Youth Girls champions

China
Third title

== Awards ==
- MVP: (China) Wang Yimei
- Best scorer: (Thailand) Saymai Paladsrichuay
- Best spiker: (North Korea) Kim Song-ok
- Best blocker: (India) Betsy Thankachen
- Best server: (China) Ma Xiaoying
- Best setter: (Thailand) Kamonporn Sukmak
- Best digger: (Thailand) Suvipriew Bamrung
- Best receiver: (North Korea) Sin Yong-sun
