= 2010 Asian Youth Girls' Volleyball Championship =

Tournament details
- Host country: Malaysia
- Dates: 20–28 May
- Teams: 13
- Venue: 1 (in 1 host city)

Final positions
- Champions: Japan (4th title)

Tournament awards
- MVP: (Japan) Mari Horikawa

The 2010 Asian Youth Girls' Volleyball Championship was held in Cheras Badminton Stadium, Kuala Lumpur, Malaysia from 20 to 28 May 2010.

== Pools composition ==
The teams were seeded based on their final ranking at the 2008 Asian Youth Girls Volleyball Championship.

Pool A	Pool B	Pool C	Pool D
Malaysia (Host); Kazakhstan (9th); Singapore	Japan (1st); Australia (7th); New Zealand	China (2nd); Chinese Taipei (5th); Iran	Thailand (3rd); South Korea (4th); Vietnam; India

== Preliminary round ==
=== Pool A ===
Pos	Team	Pld	W	L	Pts	SW	SL	SR	SPW	SPL	SPR	Qualification
1	Kazakhstan	2	2	0	4	6	0	MAX	150	80	1.875	Pool E
2	Malaysia	2	1	1	3	3	3	1.000	116	124	0.935	Pool E
3	Singapore	2	0	2	2	0	6	0.000	88	150	0.587	Pool G

Date	Time		Score		Set 1	Set 2	Set 3	Set 4	Set 5	Total
20 May	16:30	Malaysia	3–0	Singapore	25–15	25–20	25–14			75–49
21 May	18:00	Malaysia	0–3	Kazakhstan	21–25	10–25	10–25			41–75
22 May	12:00	Singapore	0–3	Kazakhstan	10–25	15–25	14–25			39–75

=== Pool B ===
Pos	Team	Pld	W	L	Pts	SW	SL	SR	SPW	SPL	SPR	Qualification
1	Japan	2	2	0	4	6	0	MAX	150	58	2.586	Pool F
2	Australia	2	1	1	3	3	4	0.750	120	154	0.779	Pool F
3	New Zealand	2	0	2	2	1	6	0.167	108	166	0.651	Pool H

Date	Time		Score		Set 1	Set 2	Set 3	Set 4	Set 5	Total
20 May	09:00	Australia	3–1	New Zealand	25–20	25–14	16–25	25–20		91–79
21 May	11:00	Japan	3–0	Australia	25–13	25–12	25–4			75–29
22 May	18:00	New Zealand	0–3	Japan	9–25	8–25	12–25			29–75

=== Pool C ===
Pos	Team	Pld	W	L	Pts	SW	SL	SR	SPW	SPL	SPR	Qualification
1	China	2	2	0	4	6	0	MAX	151	90	1.678	Pool E
2	Chinese Taipei	2	1	1	3	3	4	0.750	149	144	1.035	Pool E
3	Iran	2	0	2	2	1	6	0.167	107	173	0.618	Pool G

Date	Time		Score		Set 1	Set 2	Set 3	Set 4	Set 5	Total
20 May	11:00	Iran	0–3	China	13–25	13–25	13–25			39–75
21 May	09:00	Chinese Taipei	3–1	Iran	23–25	25–12	25–17	25–14		98–68
22 May	20:00	China	3–0	Chinese Taipei	26–24	25–10	25–17			76–51

=== Pool D ===
Pos	Team	Pld	W	L	Pts	SW	SL	SR	SPW	SPL	SPR	Qualification
1	South Korea	3	3	0	6	9	1	9.000	243	143	1.699	Pool F
2	Thailand	3	2	1	5	7	3	2.333	232	160	1.450	Pool F
3	Vietnam	3	1	2	4	3	7	0.429	166	228	0.728	Pool H
4	India	3	0	3	3	1	9	0.111	134	244	0.549	Pool H

Date	Time		Score		Set 1	Set 2	Set 3	Set 4	Set 5	Total
20 May	18:30	Vietnam	0–3	Thailand	13–25	8–25	17–25			38–75
20 May	20:30	South Korea	3–0	India	25–11	25–6	25–10			75–27
21 May	16:00	Vietnam	3–1	India	19–25	25–20	25–14	25–19		94–78
21 May	20:00	South Korea	3–1	Thailand	25–21	18–25	25–18	25–18		93–82
22 May	14:00	Vietnam	0–3	South Korea	11–25	8–25	15–25			34–75
22 May	16:00	India	0–3	Thailand	7–25	11–25	11–25			29–75

== Classification round ==
- The results and the points of the matches between the same teams that were already played during the preliminary round were taken into account for the classification round.

=== Pool E ===
Pos	Team	Pld	W	L	Pts	SW	SL	SR	SPW	SPL	SPR	Qualification
1	China	3	3	0	6	9	0	MAX	226	122	1.852	Quarterfinals
2	Chinese Taipei	3	2	1	5	6	4	1.500	212	170	1.247	Quarterfinals
3	Kazakhstan	3	1	2	4	4	6	0.667	177	202	0.876	Quarterfinals
4	Malaysia	3	0	3	3	0	9	0.000	104	225	0.462	Quarterfinals

Date	Time		Score		Set 1	Set 2	Set 3	Set 4	Set 5	Total
23 May	14:00	Kazakhstan	1–3	Chinese Taipei	17–25	14–25	25–11	12–25		68–86
23 May	16:00	China	3–0	Malaysia	25–9	25–15	25–13			75–37
24 May	18:00	Malaysia	0–3	Chinese Taipei	9–25	10–25	7–25			26–75
24 May	20:00	Kazakhstan	0–3	China	8–25	9–25	17–25			34–75

=== Pool F ===
Pos	Team	Pld	W	L	Pts	SW	SL	SR	SPW	SPL	SPR	Qualification
1	Japan	3	3	0	6	9	1	9.000	248	152	1.632	Quarterfinals
2	South Korea	3	2	1	5	6	5	1.200	244	229	1.066	Quarterfinals
3	Thailand	3	1	2	4	5	7	0.714	248	251	0.988	Quarterfinals
4	Australia	3	0	3	3	2	9	0.222	161	269	0.599	Quarterfinals

Date	Time		Score		Set 1	Set 2	Set 3	Set 4	Set 5	Total
23 May	18:00	Japan	3–1	Thailand	25–17	23–25	25–20	25–10		98–72
23 May	20:00	South Korea	3–1	Australia	25–18	25–12	25–27	25–15		100–72
24 May	12:00	Australia	1–3	Thailand	16–25	16–25	25–19	3–25		60–94
24 May	16:00	Japan	3–0	South Korea	25–17	25–17	25–17			75–51

=== Pool G ===
Pos	Team	Pld	W	L	Pts	SW	SL	SR	SPW	SPL	SPR	Qualification
1	Iran	1	1	0	2	3	0	MAX	75	44	1.705	9th–12th place
2	Singapore	1	0	1	1	0	3	0.000	44	75	0.587	9th–12th place

Date	Time		Score		Set 1	Set 2	Set 3	Set 4	Set 5	Total
23 May	12:00	Singapore	0–3	Iran	10–25	16–25	18–25			44–75

=== Pool H ===
Pos	Team	Pld	W	L	Pts	SW	SL	SR	SPW	SPL	SPR	Qualification
1	Vietnam	2	2	0	4	6	3	2.000	205	183	1.120	9th–12th place
2	New Zealand	2	1	1	3	5	3	1.667	185	181	1.022	9th–12th place
3	India	2	0	2	2	1	6	0.167	148	174	0.851	

Date	Time		Score		Set 1	Set 2	Set 3	Set 4	Set 5	Total
23 May	10:00	New Zealand	3–0	India	25–19	27–25	28–26			80–70
24 May	10:00	New Zealand	2–3	Vietnam	21–25	26–24	25–22	20–25	13–15	105–111

== Classification 9th–12th ==
9th–12th places
26 May – Kuala Lumpur
Iran	3
New Zealand	0
26 May – Kuala Lumpur
Vietnam	3
Singapore	0

9th place
27 May – Kuala Lumpur
Iran	3
Vietnam	0
11th place
27 May – Kuala Lumpur
New Zealand	3
Singapore	0

=== Semifinals ===
Date	Time		Score		Set 1	Set 2	Set 3	Set 4	Set 5	Total
26 May	10:00	Iran	3–0	New Zealand	25–13	25–17	25–14			75–44
26 May	12:00	Vietnam	3–0	Singapore	25–21	25–17	25–16			75–54

=== 11th place ===
Date	Time		Score		Set 1	Set 2	Set 3	Set 4	Set 5	Total
27 May	10:00	New Zealand	3–0	Singapore	26–24	25–22	25–18			76–64

=== 9th place ===
Date	Time		Score		Set 1	Set 2	Set 3	Set 4	Set 5	Total
27 May	12:00	Iran	3–0	Vietnam	25–18	25–17	25–21			75–56

== Final round ==
Quarterfinals
26 May – Kuala Lumpur
China	3
Australia	0
26 May – Kuala Lumpur
South Korea	3
Kazakhstan	1
26 May – Kuala Lumpur
Japan	3
Malaysia	0
26 May – Kuala Lumpur
Chinese Taipei	0
Thailand	3

Semifinals
27 May – Kuala Lumpur
China	3
South Korea	0
27 May – Kuala Lumpur
Japan	3
Thailand	0

Final
28 May – Kuala Lumpur
China	0
Japan	3
3rd place
28 May – Kuala Lumpur
South Korea	1
Thailand	3

5th–8th places
27 May – Kuala Lumpur
Australia	1
Kazakhstan	3
27 May – Kuala Lumpur
Malaysia	0
Chinese Taipei	3

5th place
28 May – Kuala Lumpur
Kazakhstan	0
Chinese Taipei	3
7th place
28 May – Kuala Lumpur
Australia	3
Malaysia	0

=== Quarterfinals ===
Date	Time		Score		Set 1	Set 2	Set 3	Set 4	Set 5	Total
26 May	14:00	China	3–0	Australia	25–12	25–14	25–13			75–39
26 May	16:00	Japan	3–0	Malaysia	25–6	25–13	25–4			75–23
26 May	18:00	Chinese Taipei	0–3	Thailand	14–25	16–25	14–25			44–75
26 May	20:00	South Korea	3–1	Kazakhstan	25–22	17–25	25–11	25–15		92–73

=== 5th–8th semifinals ===
Date	Time		Score		Set 1	Set 2	Set 3	Set 4	Set 5	Total
27 May	14:00	Australia	1–3	Kazakhstan	25–23	24–26	18–25	27–29		94–103
27 May	16:00	Malaysia	0–3	Chinese Taipei	6–25	12–25	12–25			30–75

=== Semifinals ===
Date	Time		Score		Set 1	Set 2	Set 3	Set 4	Set 5	Total
27 May	18:00	China	3–0	South Korea	25–23	25–21	25–18			75–62
27 May	20:00	Japan	3–0	Thailand	25–14	25–17	25–15			75–46

=== 7th place ===
Date	Time		Score		Set 1	Set 2	Set 3	Set 4	Set 5	Total
28 May	09:00	Australia	3–0	Malaysia	25–10	25–20	25–19			75–49

=== 5th place ===
Date	Time		Score		Set 1	Set 2	Set 3	Set 4	Set 5	Total
28 May	11:00	Kazakhstan	0–3	Chinese Taipei	17–25	12–25	24–26			53–76

=== 3rd place ===
Date	Time		Score		Set 1	Set 2	Set 3	Set 4	Set 5	Total
28 May	15:00	South Korea	1–3	Thailand	13–25	24–26	25–21	17–25		79–97

=== Final ===
Date	Time		Score		Set 1	Set 2	Set 3	Set 4	Set 5	Total
28 May	17:00	China	0–3	Japan	21–25	20–25	14–25			55–75

== Final standing ==
Rank	Team
1st place, gold medalist(s)	Japan
2nd place, silver medalist(s)	China
3rd place, bronze medalist(s)	Thailand
4	South Korea
5	Chinese Taipei
6	Kazakhstan
7	Australia
8	Malaysia
9	Iran
10	Vietnam
11	New Zealand
12	Singapore
13	India

Qualified for the 2010 Summer Youth Olympics and 2011 FIVB Girls Youth World Championship
Qualified for the 2011 FIVB Girls Youth World Championship

2010 Asian Youth Girls champions

Japan
Fourth title

Team Roster
Fumika Moriya, Mari Horikawa, Saori Kaneko, Azusa Futami, Kaho Ano, Mirei Sasaki, Yukiko Yanagidani, Yumiko Mochimaru, Sumiko Mori, Riho Otake, Aya Yamakami, Mika Yamada
Head Coach: Yoshiki Ogawa

== Awards ==
- MVP: (Japan) Mari Horikawa
- Best scorer: (South Korea) Park Jeong-ah
- Best spiker: (Japan) Fumika Moriya
- Best blocker: (China) Liu Yanhan
- Best server: (China) Liu Mingjuan
- Best setter: (Japan) Yukiko Yanagidani
- Best libero: (Japan) Sumiko Mori
