= Thailand women's national under-19 volleyball team =

Thailand Under-19
- Association: Thailand Volleyball Association
- Confederation: AVC
- Head coach: Chamnan Dokmai

Uniforms
Home	Away	Third

Youth Olympic Games
- Appearances: None

FIVB U19 World Championship
- Appearances: 11 (First in 1997)
- Best result: 5th (1997)

Asian U18 Asian Championship
- Appearances: 15 (First in 1997)
- Best result: (silver) (2014)
Honours
Asian Championship
Silver medal – second place	2014 Nakhon Ratchasima	Team
Bronze medal – third place	2003 Sisaket	Team
Bronze medal – third place	2008 Manila	Team
Bronze medal – third place	2010 Kuala Lumpur	Team
Bronze medal – third place	2018 Nakhon Pathom	Team
Bronze medal – third place	2026 Nakhon Ratchasima	Team
Asian Youth Games
Bronze medal – third place	2025 Bahrain	Team

The Thailand women's national under-19 volleyball team (Thai: วอลเลย์บอลหญิงทีมชาติไทยรุ่นอายุไม่เกิน 19 ปี) represents Thailand in women's under-19 volleyball events, it is controlled and managed by the Thailand Volleyball Association (TVA) that is a member of Asian volleyball body Asian Volleyball Confederation (AVC) and the international volleyball body government the Fédération Internationale de Volleyball (FIVB). Currently ranked 5th.

== Team ==
=== Coaching staff ===
Position	Name
Head coach	(China) Feng Kun
Team manager	(Thailand) Tirawan Sang-Ob
Assistant coach	(Thailand) Suphakarn Nakapirom (Thailand) Wilavan Apinyapong
Doctor	(Thailand) Norasak Suvachittanont
Physiotherapist	(Thailand) Jureeporn Sutchar

=== Current squad ===
The following 12 players were called up for the 2024 Asian Girls' U17 Volleyball Championship in Nakhon Pathom, Thailand.

No.	Name	Date of birth	Height	Weight	Spike	Block	2024 club
1	Sasikarn Kanoiu	16 May 2007	1.81 m (5 ft 11 in)	68 kg (150 lb)	0 cm (0 in)	0 cm (0 in)	(Thailand) Angthong Sport School
3	Parita Lueamthonglang (L)	19 November 2007	1.64 m (5 ft 5 in)	70 kg (150 lb)	0 cm (0 in)	0 cm (0 in)	(Thailand) Suranaree Wittaya School
5	Nattharika Wasan	15 October 2007	1.85 m (6 ft 1 in)	66 kg (146 lb)	298 cm (117 in)	292 cm (115 in)	(Thailand) Ayutthaya Technological Commercial College
6	Supawadee Panwilai	20 July 2007	1.88 m (6 ft 2 in)	85 kg (187 lb)	0 cm (0 in)	0 cm (0 in)	(Thailand) Pattaya city 7 school
7	Kanokwan Tiansingh	10 August 2007	1.69 m (5 ft 7 in)	58 kg (128 lb)	0 cm (0 in)	0 cm (0 in)	(Thailand) Chumchonwatnongkor School
8	Sasiwimon Jongjit	3 April 2007	1.86 m (6 ft 1 in)	71 kg (157 lb)	0 cm (0 in)	0 cm (0 in)	(Thailand) Sukhothai Wittayakom School
9	Thanita Aimlaoo	29 February 2008	1.69 m (5 ft 7 in)	66 kg (146 lb)	0 cm (0 in)	0 cm (0 in)	(Thailand) Watchainawes Municipal School
10	Sasithorn Jatta (C)	9 November 2007	1.80 m (5 ft 11 in)	58 kg (128 lb)	0 cm (0 in)	0 cm (0 in)	(Thailand) Bodindecha Sing Singhaseni School
11	Atitaya Kaewnok	11 February 2007	1.78 m (5 ft 10 in)	66 kg (146 lb)	0 cm (0 in)	0 cm (0 in)	(Thailand) Chumchonwatnongkor School
12	Napatsorn Pumnin	31 December 2007	1.92 m (6 ft 4 in)	76 kg (168 lb)	295 cm (116 in)	288 cm (113 in)	(Thailand) Angthong Sport School
13	Wisaruta Sengna	14 February 2007	1.80 m (5 ft 11 in)	75 kg (165 lb)	0 cm (0 in)	0 cm (0 in)	(Thailand) Nakornnon wittaya 6 School
16	Kornkanok Chabamnet	24 January 2007	1.70 m (5 ft 7 in)	62 kg (137 lb)	0 cm (0 in)	0 cm (0 in)	(Thailand) Wangchanwittaya School

== Statistics ==
Updated after 2022 Asian Championship

Competition	1st place, gold medalist(s)	2nd place, silver medalist(s)	3rd place, bronze medalist(s)	Total
Asian Championship	0	1	4	5
Total	0	1	4	5

== Record against selected opponents ==
Record against opponents in Asian Championships and World Championships (as of 1 August 2023):

- Algeria 1–0
- Argentina 1–1
- Australia 8–0
- Belgium 0–2
- Brazil 0–2
- Canada 0–1
- China 2–8
- Czech Republic 0–1
- Colombia 0–1
- Croatia 0–1
- Cuba 1–1
- Dominican Republic 0–2
- Egypt 4–1
- Germany 1–2
- Hong Kong 5–0
- India 5–0
- Iran 2–0
- Italy 1–4
- Japan 0–10
- Kazakhstan 3–0
- North Korea 2–1
- South Korea 4–11
- Malaysia 3–0
- Mexico 1–0
- Mongolia 1–0
- New Zealand 1–0
- Nigeria 2–0
- Peru 1–1
- Philippines 6–0
- Poland 2–3
- Puerto Rico 2–0
- Romania 1–1
- Russia 0–2
- Serbia 0–3
- Serbia and Montenegro 1–0
- Singapore 2–0
- Sri Lanka 1–0
- Slovakia 1–0
- Slovenia 0–1
- Chinese Taipei 8–4
- Turkey 0–1
- Ukraine 1–0
- United States 0–2
- Uzbekistan 1–0
- Vietnam 2–0

== Competition history ==
=== Youth Olympic Games ===
Champions Runners-up Third place Fourth place

Youth Olympic Games record
Year	Round	Position	GP	MW	ML	SW	SL	Squad
(Singapore) 2010	Did not qualify							
Total	0 Titles	0/1	—	—	—	—	—	—

=== World Championship ===
Champions Runners-up Third place Fourth place

World Championship record
Year	Round	Position	GP	MW	ML	SW	SL	Squad
(Brazil) 1989	Did not qualify							
(Portugal) 1991	Did not qualify							
(Czechoslovakia) 1993	Did not qualify							
(France) 1995	Did not qualify							
(Thailand) 1997	Quarterfinals	5th place	7	5	2	16	6	—
(Portugal) 1999	Did not qualify							
(Croatia) 2001	Did not qualify							
(Poland) 2003	Quarterfinals	6th place	7	3	4	14	16	—
(Macau) 2005	Did not qualify							
(Mexico) 2007	Did not qualify							
(Thailand) 2009	5th–8th semifinals	7th place	8	3	5	13	18	—
(Turkey) 2011	Group round	13th Place	8	3	5	11	15	—
(Thailand) 2013	Round of 16	16th place	8	3	5	13	16	—
(Peru) 2015	Group round	18th place	7	2	5	9	17	Squad
(Argentina) 2017	Group round	17th place	7	2	5	9	15	Squad
(Egypt) 2019	Round of 16	15th place	8	2	6	13	20	Squad
(Mexico) 2021	Round of 16	11th Place	8	4	4	16	13	–
(Hungary) (Croatia) 2023	Quarterfinals	6th place	9	4	5	14	19	–
(Serbia) (Croatia) 2025	Round of 16	13th place	9	3	6	13	19	–
Total	0 Titles	11/18	77	30	47	127	155	—

=== Asian Championship ===
Champions Runners-up Third place Fourth place

Asian Championship record
Year	Round	Position	GP	MW	ML	SW	SL	Squad
(Thailand) 1997	Round robin	4th place	7	4	3	15	9	—
(Singapore) 1999	Group round	5th place	6	4	2	12	6	—
(Thailand) 2001	Group round	5th place	6	4	2	15	8	—
(Thailand) 2003	Round robin	3rd place	7	5	2	16	8	—
(Philippines) 2005	Group round	5th place	7	4	3	13	10	—
(Thailand) 2007	Round robin	5th place	7	3	4	9	12	—
(Philippines) 2008	Semifinals	3rd place	7	5	2	18	7	—
(Malaysia) 2010	Semifinals	3rd place	8	5	3	13	11	—
(China) 2012	Quarterfinals	5th place	7	5	2	17	6	—
(Thailand) 2014	Final	Runners-Up	7	6	1	19	5	—
(China) 2017	Semifinals	4th place	6	3	3	11	9	—
(Thailand) 2018	Semifinals	3rd place	5	4	1	14	8	—
(Thailand) 2020	Cancelled							
(Thailand) 2022	Semifinals	4th place	6	3	3	11	10	—
(Thailand) 2024	Semifinals	4th place	6	3	3	9	10	—
(Thailand) 2026	Semifinals	3rd place	6	5	1	16	5	—
Total	0 titles	15/15	93	61	32	208	124	—

=== Asian Youth Games ===
Gold Silver Bronze Fourth place

Asian Youth Games record
Year	Round	Position	GP	MW	ML	SW	SL
(Bahrain) 2025	Semifinals	Bronze	7	6	1	18	4
Total	1/1	0 title	7	6	1	18	4

== See also ==
- Thailand women's national volleyball team
- Thailand women's national under-21 volleyball team
- Thailand women's national under-23 volleyball team
