= AVC Girls' U18 Volleyball Championship =

International youth volleyball competition

- Current season, competition or edition: 2026 AVC Girls' U18 Volleyball Championship
- Formerly: Asian Youth Women's Volleyball Championship (1997–2001); Asian Youth Girls' Volleyball Championship (2003–2012); Asian Girls' Volleyball Championship (2014–2017); Asian Women's U17 Volleyball Championship (2018); Asian Women's U18 Volleyball Championship (2022–2024)
- Sport: Volleyball
- Founded: 1997; 29 years ago
- First season: 1997
- No. of teams: 16
- Continents: Asia and Oceania (AVC)
- Most recent champions: China (6th title)
- Most titles: Japan (9 titles)

The AVC Girls' U18 Volleyball Championship is an international volleyball competition in Asia and Oceania contested by the under-18 women's national teams of the members of Asian Volleyball Confederation (AVC). First held in 1997, the tournament is held biennially and serves as a qualification tournament for the FIVB Volleyball Girls' U19 World Championship.

The competition broke its biennial design only in 2008, a year after it held its 2007 competition in Kamphaeng Phet, and in 2018, following the holding of a competition in 2017 in Chongqing after the tournament skipped the year 2016. It formerly carried the title Asian Youth Women's Volleyball Championship (in the tournament's 1st, 2nd and 3rd editions), the Asian Youth Girls' Volleyball Championship (in the 4th-9th editions), and the Asian Girls' Volleyball Championship (in the 10th and 11th editions, with the difference that the 10th edition, like the 9th edition, labeled the tournament as a U17 championship, while the 11th edition touted it as a U18 one, like the 8th edition).

14 of the championship's tournaments have been won by two different national teams. Japan have won nine times, and China have won five times.

== Result summary ==
Year	Host	Final			Third place match			Teams
Year	Host	Champions	Score	Runners-up	Third-place	Score	Fourth-place	Teams
1997; Details	(Thailand); Yala	Japan	Round-robin	South Korea	China	Round-robin	Thailand	8
1999; Details	Singapore	China	Round-robin	Japan	Chinese Taipei	Round-robin	South Korea	8
2001; Details	(Thailand); Trang	China	3–0	Japan	South Korea	3–2	Chinese Taipei	9
2003; Details	(Thailand); Sisaket	China	Round-robin	North Korea	Thailand	Round-robin	Chinese Taipei	8
2005; Details	(Philippines); Mandaue	China	3–2	South Korea	Chinese Taipei	3–2	Japan	9
2007; Details	(Thailand); Kamphaeng Phet	Japan	Round-robin	South Korea	China	Round-robin	Chinese Taipei	8
2008; Details	(Philippines); Manila	Japan	3–0	China	Thailand	3–0	South Korea	12
2010; Details	(Malaysia); Kuala Lumpur	Japan	3–0	China	Thailand	3–1	South Korea	13
2012; Details	(China); Chengdu	Japan	3–1	China	Chinese Taipei	3–0	South Korea	13
2014; Details	(Thailand); Nakhon Ratchasima	Japan	3–1	Thailand	China	3–0	South Korea	13
2017; Details	(China); Chongqing	Japan	3–0	China	South Korea	3–0	Thailand	11
2018; Details	(Thailand); Nakhon Pathom	Japan	3–1	China	Thailand	3–1	South Korea	12
2020	(Thailand); Nakhon Pathom	Cancelled due to COVID-19 pandemic						
2022; Details	(Thailand); Nakhon Pathom	Japan	3–2	China	South Korea	3–2	Thailand	11
2024; Details	(Thailand); Nakhon Pathom	China	3–0	Japan	Chinese Taipei	3–0	Thailand	13
2026; Details	(Thailand); Nakhon Ratchasima	China	3–0	South Korea	Thailand	3–2	Japan	16

=== Teams reaching the top four ===
Team	Winners	Runners-up	Third-place	Fourth-place
Japan	9 (1997, 2007, 2008, 2010, 2012, 2014, 2017, 2018, 2022)	3 (1999, 2001, 2024)		2 (2005, 2026)
China	6 (1999, 2001, 2003, 2005, 2024, 2026)	6 (2008, 2010, 2012, 2017, 2018, 2022)	3 (1997, 2007, 2014)	
South Korea		4 (1997, 2005, 2007, 2026)	3 (2001, 2017, 2022)	6 (1999, 2008, 2010, 2012, 2014, 2018)
Thailand		1 (2014)	5 (2003, 2008, 2010, 2018, 2026)	4 (1997, 2017, 2022, 2024)
North Korea		1 (2003)		
Chinese Taipei			4 (1999, 2005, 2012, 2024)	3 (2001, 2003, 2007)

=== Champions by region ===
Federation (Region)	Champion(s)	Number
EAZVA (East Asia)	Japan (9), China (6)	15 titles

== Hosts ==
Times Hosted	Nations	Year(s)
9	Thailand	1997, 2001, 2003, 2007, 2014, 2018, ~~2020~~, 2022, 2024, 2026
2	China	2012, 2017
2	Philippines	2005, 2008
1	Singapore	1999
1	Malaysia	2010

== Medal table ==
Rank	Nation	Gold	Silver	Bronze	Total
1	Japan	9	3	0	12
2	China	6	6	3	15
3	South Korea	0	4	3	7
4	Thailand	0	1	5	6
5	North Korea	0	1	0	1
6	Chinese Taipei	0	0	4	4
Totals (6 entries)		15	15	15	45

== Participating nations ==
Legend

- 1st – Champions
- 2nd – Runners-up
- 3rd – Third place
- 4th – Fourth place
- • – Did not enter / Did not qualify
- – Hosts
- Q – Qualified for the forthcoming tournament

Year Team	(Thailand) 1997 (8)	(Singapore) 1999 (8)	(Thailand) 2001 (9)	(Thailand) 2003 (8)	(Philippines) 2005 (9)	(Thailand) 2007 (8)	(Philippines) 2008 (12)	(Malaysia) 2010 (13)	(China) 2012 (13)	(Thailand) 2014 (13)	(China) 2017 (11)	(Thailand) 2018 (12)	(Thailand) 2022 (12)	(Thailand) 2024 (13)	(Thailand) 2026 (16)	Years
Australia	•	6th	8th	7th	6th	8th	7th	7th	11th	13th	7th	9th	11th	9th	13th	14
China	3rd	1st	1st	1st	1st	3rd	2nd	2nd	2nd	3rd	2nd	2nd	2nd	1st	1st	15
Chinese Taipei	5th	3rd	4th	4th	3rd	4th	5th	5th	3rd	5th	5th	5th	5th	3rd	10th	15
Hong Kong	•	•	•	•	•	•	•	•	8th	9th	6th	12th	•	11th	11th	6
India	•	•	9th	5th	9th	6th	10th	13th	6th	11th	•	8th	10th	12th	16th	12
Indonesia	•	•	•	•	•	•	6th	•	•	•	•	•	•	•	7th	2
Iran	•	•	•	•	•	•	11th	9th	10th	10th	9th	7th	7th	6th	12th	9
Japan	1st	2nd	2nd	•	4th	1st	1st	1st	1st	1st	1st	1st	1st	2nd	4th	14
Kazakhstan	•	•	•	6th	•	•	9th	6th	7th	6th	•	6th	6th	7th	6th	9
Kyrgyzstan	•	•	•	•	•	•	•	•	•	•	•	•	•	•	15th	1
Macau	•	•	•	•	•	•	•	•	•	•	•	•	•	13th	•	1
Malaysia	6th	•	7th	•	•	•	•	8th	•	•	•	11th	•	•	•	4
Mongolia	•	•	•	•	•	•	•	•	12th	•	•	•	•	•	8th	2
New Zealand	•	•	•	•	•	•	•	11th	•	8th	8th	10th	•	•	•	4
North Korea	•	•	6th	2nd	•	•	•	•	•	•	•	•	•	•	•	2
Philippines	8th	8th	•	8th	8th	•	8th	•	•	7th	•	•	9th	10th	9th	9
Samoa	•	•	•	•	•	•	•	•	•	•	11th	•	•	•	•	1
Singapore	7th	7th	•	•	•	•	•	12th	•	•	•	•	•	•	•	3
South Korea	2nd	4th	3rd	•	2nd	2nd	4th	4th	4th	4th	3rd	4th	3rd	5th	2nd	14
Sri Lanka	•	•	•	•	•	7th	12th	•	13th	•	•	•	•	•	•	3
Thailand	4th	5th	5th	3rd	5th	5th	3rd	3rd	5th	2nd	4th	3rd	4th	4th	3rd	15
Uzbekistan	•	•	•	•	•	•	•	•	•	•	10th	•	8th	8th	14th	4
Vietnam	•	•	•	•	7th	•	•	10th	9th	12th	•	•	•	•	5th	5

=== Debut of teams ===
Year	Debutants	Total
1997	China	8
1997	Chinese Taipei	8
1997	Japan	8
1997	Malaysia	8
1997	Philippines	8
1997	Singapore	8
1997	South Korea	8
1997	Thailand	8
1999	Australia	1
2001	India	2
2001	North Korea	2
2003	Kazakhstan	1
2005	Vietnam	1
2007	Sri Lanka	1
2008	Indonesia	2
2008	Iran	2
2010	New Zealand	1
2012	Hong Kong	2
2012	Mongolia	2
2014	None	0
2017	Samoa	2
2017	Uzbekistan	2
2018	None	0
2022	None	0
2024	Macau	1
2026	Kyrgyzstan	1

== Awards ==
=== Most Valuable Player ===
Tournament	Most Valuable Player
1997 Yala	(Japan) Midori Takahashi
2001 Trang	(China) Huang Huiping
2003 Sisaket	(China) Wang Yimei
2007 Kamphaeng Phet	(Japan) Miyu Nagaoka
2008 Manila	(Japan) Shiori Murata
2010 Kuala Lumpur	(Japan) Mari Horikawa
2012 Chengdu	(Japan) Sarina Koga
2014 Nakhon Ratchasima	(Japan) Airi Miyabe
2017 Chongqing	(Japan) Nishikawa Yuki
2018 Nakhon Pathom	(Japan) Nishikawa Yoshino
2022 Nakhon Pathom	(Japan) Sae Omori
2024 Nakhon Pathom	(China) Wang Shuming
2026 Nakhon Ratchasima	(China) Xuan Yachen

=== Best Outside Spikers ===
Tournament	Best Outside Spikers
2014 Nakhon Ratchasima	(South Korea) Ko Minji
2014 Nakhon Ratchasima	(Thailand) Chatchu-on Moksri
2017 Chongqing	(South Korea) Park Hyemin
2017 Chongqing	(Japan) Nishikawa Yuki
2018 Nakhon Pathom	(Japan) Nishikawa Yoshino
2018 Nakhon Pathom	(China) Zhou Yetong
2022 Nakhon Pathom	(Japan) Sae Omori
2022 Nakhon Pathom	(China) Chen Xinyue
2024 Nakhon Pathom	(China) Zhai Yurui
2024 Nakhon Pathom	(Chinese Taipei) Chen Pinyu
2026 Nakhon Ratchasima	(China) Ren Sichen
2026 Nakhon Ratchasima	(Thailand) Natchaya Ta-Hae

=== Best Opposite Spiker ===
Tournament	Best Opposite Spiker
2014 Nakhon Ratchasima	(Thailand) Pimpichaya Kokram
2017 Chongqing	(China) Sun Xiaoxuan
2018 Nakhon Pathom	(Japan) Manami Koyama
2022 Nakhon Pathom	(China) Wang Yindi
2024 Nakhon Pathom	(Japan) Chugangi Rion
2026 Nakhon Ratchasima	(China) Zhang Yijia

=== Best Setter ===
Tournament	Best Setter
2001 Trang	(China) Zhang Qian
2003 Sisaket	(Thailand) Kamonporn Sukmak
2007 Kamphaeng Phet	(Japan) Si Eun-mi
2008 Manila	(Japan) Chisato Mitsuyama
2010 Kuala Lumpur	(Japan) Yukiko Yanagidani
2012 Chengdu	(Japan) Airi Tahara
2014 Nakhon Ratchasima	(Thailand) Natthanicha Jaisaen
2017 Chongqing	(China) Zhang Zihan
2018 Nakhon Pathom	(Thailand) Supatcha Kamtalaksa
2022 Nakhon Pathom	(Japan) Yoshida Sanae
2024 Nakhon Pathom	(Japan) Tanyama Tsubaki
2026 Nakhon Ratchasima	(China) Xuan Yachen

=== Best Middle Blockers ===
Tournament	Best Middle Blockers
2014 Nakhon Ratchasima	(China) Li Yingying
2014 Nakhon Ratchasima	(Japan) Miyu Nakagawa
2017 Chongqing	(China) Mao Junyi
2017 Chongqing	(South Korea) Lee Juah
2018 Nakhon Pathom	(China) Wu Mengjie
2018 Nakhon Pathom	(Japan) Madoka Kashimura
2022 Nakhon Pathom	(China) Shan Linqian
2022 Nakhon Pathom	(South Korea) Kim Sebeen
2024 Nakhon Pathom	(China) Wang Aoqian
2024 Nakhon Pathom	(Thailand) Sasitorn Jatta
2026 Nakhon Ratchasima	(China) Si Jingyu
2026 Nakhon Ratchasima	(South Korea) Park Seoyoon

=== Best Libero ===
Tournament	Best Libero
2008 Manila	(Japan) Sumiko Mori
2010 Kuala Lumpur	(Japan) Sumiko Mori
2012 Chengdu	(Chinese Taipei) Lin Miao-hua
2014 Nakhon Ratchasima	(Japan) Kanoha Kagamihara
2017 Chongqing	(Japan) Mizusugi Rena
2018 Nakhon Pathom	(Thailand) Jidapa Nahuanong
2022 Nakhon Pathom	(Japan) Rin Nishikawa
2024 Nakhon Pathom	(China) Song Jiayi
2026 Nakhon Ratchasima	(South Korea) Cho Libin

== Former awards ==
=== Best Scorer ===
Tournament	Best Scorer
1997 Yala	(Japan) Mari Ochiai
2001 Trang	(China) Huang Huiping
2003 Sisaket	(Thailand) Saymai Paladsrichuay
2005 Mandaue	(South Korea) Kim Yeon-Koung
2007 Kamphaeng Phet	(South Korea) Lee Yeon-Ju
2008 Manila	(China) Yang Jie
2010 Kuala Lumpur	(South Korea) Park Jeong-ah
2012 Chengdu	(Japan) Sarina Koga

=== Best Spiker ===
Tournament	Best Spiker
1997 Yala	(South Korea) Lee Yun-hui
2001 Trang	(China) Huang Huiping
2003 Sisaket	(North Korea) Kim Song-ok
2007 Kamphaeng Phet	(Japan) Miyu Nagaoka
2008 Manila	(Japan) Shiori Murata
2010 Kuala Lumpur	(Japan) Fumika Moriya
2012 Chengdu	(China) Hu Mingyuan

=== Best Server ===
Tournament	Best Server
1997 Yala	(China) Tian Jia
2001 Trang	(China) Lu Yan
2003 Sisaket	(China) Ma Xiaoying
2007 Kamphaeng Phet	(Japan) Yuki Kawai
2008 Manila	(South Korea) Kim Mi-yeon
2010 Kuala Lumpur	(China) Liu Mingjuan
2012 Chengdu	(Chinese Taipei) Chen Tzu-ya

=== Best Blocker ===
Tournament	Best Blocker
1997 Yala	(Thailand) Rattana Sanguanrum
2001 Trang	(China) Huang Huiping
2003 Sisaket	(India) Betsy Thankachen
2007 Kamphaeng Phet	(Chinese Taipei) Chen Shih-ting
2008 Manila	(China) Wang Huimin
2010 Kuala Lumpur	(China) Liu Yanhan
2012 Chengdu	(China) Yuan Xinyue

=== Best Receiver ===
Tournament	Best Receiver
2003 Sisaket	(South Korea) Sin Yong-sun
2005 Mandaue	(South Korea) Kim Yeon-Koung
2007 Kamphaeng Phet	(Japan) Airi Kawahara

=== Best Digger ===
Tournament	Best Digger
2003 Sisaket	(Thailand) Suvipriew Bamrung
2007 Kamphaeng Phet	(Japan) Kotoe Inoue

== See also ==
- AVC Boys' U18 Volleyball Championship
- AVC Women's Volleyball Continental Championship
- AVC Women's Volleyball Cup
- AVC Women's U20 Volleyball Championship
- AVC Girls' U16 Volleyball Championship
