= Indonesia women's national under-19 volleyball team =

Indonesia women's U-19
- Association: Indonesian Volleyball Federation (PBVSI)
- Confederation: AVC
- Head coach: Angga Hasan Mubarok

Uniforms
Home	Away

Asian U18 Championship
- Appearances: 2 (First in 2008)
- Best result: 6th (2008)

The Indonesia women's national under-19 volleyball team (Indonesian: Tim nasional bola voli U-19 putri Indonesia) represents Indonesia in women's under-19 and 18 level in international volleyball competitions. It is controlled and managed by the Indonesian Volleyball Federation (PBVSI) that is a member Asian Volleyball Confederation (AVC) and the Fédération Internationale de Volleyball (FIVB).

== Competition history ==
=== Asian U18 Championship ===
Champions Runners-up 3rd place 4th place

Asian U18 Championship
Year	Round	Position	Pld	W	L	SW	SL	Squad
(Thailand) 1997	Did not participate							
(Singapore) 1999	Did not participate							
(Thailand) 2001	Did not participate							
(Thailand) 2003	Did not participate							
(Philippines) 2005	Did not participate							
(Thailand) 2007	Did not participate							
(Philippines) 2008	Classification Round	6th place	7	2	5	6	17	Squad
(Malaysia) 2010	Did not participate							
(China) 2012	Did not participate							
(Thailand) 2014	Did not participate							
(China) 2017	Did not participate							
(Thailand) 2018	Did not participate							
(Thailand) 2020	Cancelled due to COVID-19 pandemic							
(Thailand) 2022	Did not participate							
(Thailand) 2024	Did not participate							
(Thailand) 2026	Classification Round	7th place	6	3	3	11	10	Squad
Total	0 Titles	1/16	13	5	8	17	27	—

== Team ==
=== Current squad ===
The following list consists of 12 players who are called for 2026 AVC Girls' U18 Volleyball Championship.

Head coach: (Indonesia) Angga Hasan Mubarok

No.	Pos.	Name	Date of birth	Height	Spike	Block	2026 club
1	OH	Zebe Hawly Almadina Pramesti	7 October 2012	177 cm (5 ft 10 in)	290 cm (9 ft 6 in)	285 cm (9 ft 4 in)	(Indonesia) Yuso Yogyakarta
3	OH	Tina Syifa Sabila Salim (C)	15 July 2009	174 cm (5 ft 9 in)	295 cm (9 ft 8 in)	290 cm (9 ft 6 in)	(Indonesia) Rajawali 02C
4	L	Nathania Putri Prasetya	4 November 2009	167 cm (5 ft 6 in)	270 cm (8 ft 10 in)	265 cm (8 ft 8 in)	Gresik Petrokimia Pupuk Indonesia
5	S	Clarissa Maria Thomas	5 May 2010	172 cm (5 ft 8 in)	285 cm (9 ft 4 in)	280 cm (9 ft 2 in)	(Indonesia) Wahana
6	OP	Arimbi Syifana Andayani	18 May 2012	178 cm (5 ft 10 in)	293 cm (9 ft 7 in)	290 cm (9 ft 6 in)	(Indonesia) Rajawali 02C
9	MB	Ibovna Anindya Thalita Sahuri	12 February 2011	177 cm (5 ft 10 in)	287 cm (9 ft 5 in)	285 cm (9 ft 4 in)	Gresik Petrokimia Pupuk Indonesia
10	OH	Vania Nurfatimah Hafani	1 May 2010	170 cm (5 ft 7 in)	285 cm (9 ft 4 in)	280 cm (9 ft 2 in)	(Indonesia) Rajawali 02C
11	MB	Yzuri Aida Najera Katalina	17 November 2010	175 cm (5 ft 9 in)	285 cm (9 ft 4 in)	280 cm (9 ft 2 in)	Gresik Petrokimia Pupuk Indonesia
12	S	Shakira Ayu Tirta Wijaya	7 October 2009	170 cm (5 ft 7 in)	285 cm (9 ft 4 in)	280 cm (9 ft 2 in)	(Indonesia) Rajawali 02C
17	MB	Rowina Ulfiyah Tacita Azmi	23 January 2009	179 cm (5 ft 10 in)	293 cm (9 ft 7 in)	290 cm (9 ft 6 in)	(Indonesia) JVC
23	OP	Khanza Putri Yansi Ganestri	4 September 2010	180 cm (5 ft 11 in)	280 cm (9 ft 2 in)	260 cm (8 ft 6 in)	Gresik Petrokimia Pupuk Indonesia
25	OH	Venisa Dwi Oktaviani	3 October 2009	175 cm (5 ft 9 in)	287 cm (9 ft 5 in)	285 cm (9 ft 4 in)	(Indonesia) JVC

== See also ==
- Indonesia women's national volleyball team
- Indonesia women's national under-21 volleyball team
