= China women's national under-19 volleyball team =

Youth volleyball team representing China

China
- Association: Chinese Volleyball Association
- Confederation: AVC

Uniforms
Home	Away	Third

Youth Olympic Games
- Appearances: None

FIVB U19 World Championship
- Appearances: 13 (First in 1995)
- Best result: (gold) Gold : (2001, 2003, 2007, 2013)

AVC U18 Asian Championship
- Appearances: 15 (First in 1997)
- Best result: (gold) Gold : (1999, 2001, 2003, 2005).

The China women's national under-18 volleyball team represents China in women's under-18 volleyball events, it is controlled and managed by the Chinese Volleyball Association that is a member of Asian volleyball body Asian Volleyball Confederation (AVC) and the international volleyball body government the Fédération Internationale de Volleyball (FIVB).

== Results ==
=== Summer Youth Olympics ===
Champions Runners up Third place Fourth place

Youth Olympic Games
Year	Round	Position	Pld	W	L	SW	SL	Squad
(Singapore) 2010	Didn't Qualify							
(China) 2014	No Volleyball Event							
(Argentina) 2018	No Volleyball Event							
Total	0 Titles	0/1						

=== FIVB U19 World Championship ===
Champions Runners up Third place Fourth place

FIVB U19 World Championship
Year	Round	Position	Pld	W	L	SW	SL	Squad
(Brazil) 1989	Didn't Qualify							
(Portugal) 1991	Didn't Qualify							
(Czechoslovakia) 1993	Didn't Qualify							
(France) 1995		6th place						Squad
(Thailand) 1997	Didn't Qualify							
(Portugal) 1999		5th place						Squad
(Croatia) 2001	Final	1st place						Squad
(Poland) 2003	Final	1st place						Squad
(Macau) 2005		7th place						Squad
(Mexico) 2007	Final	1st place						Squad
(Thailand) 2009		13th place						Squad
(Turkey) 2011	Final	Runners-Up						Squad
(Thailand) 2013	Final	1st place						Squad
(Peru) 2015	Semifinals	Third place						Squad
(Argentina) 2017		19th place						Squad
(Egypt) 2019	Semifinals	4th place						Squad
(Mexico) 2021	withdrew							
(Croatia) / (Hungary) 2023		10th place						Squad
Total	4 Titles	13/18						

== Team ==
=== Current squad ===
The following is the Chinese roster in the 2017 FIVB Girls' U18 World Championship.

Head coach: Xu Jiande

No.	Name	Date of birth	Height	Weight	Spike	Block	2017 club
1	Che Wenhan	11 April 2000	1.93 m (6 ft 4 in)	67 kg (148 lb)	305 cm (120 in)	297 cm (117 in)	(China) Shandong
3	Liu Yu	13 May 2001	1.86 m (6 ft 1 in)	72 kg (159 lb)	317 cm (125 in)	311 cm (122 in)	(China) Zhejiang
4	Fang Jingyi	9 July 2001	1.84 m (6 ft 0 in)	65 kg (143 lb)	281 cm (111 in)	265 cm (104 in)	(China) Fujian
5	Liu Jingjing	13 March 2000	1.83 m (6 ft 0 in)	71 kg (157 lb)	302 cm (119 in)	294 cm (116 in)	(China) Guangdong
6	Jiao Dian	8 September 2000	1.93 m (6 ft 4 in)	72 kg (159 lb)	297 cm (117 in)	292 cm (115 in)	(China) Bayi
7	Zhang Jiaxin	20 April 2000	1.83 m (6 ft 0 in)	64 kg (141 lb)	320 cm (130 in)	310 cm (120 in)	(China) Guangdong
8	Liang Weifan	26 November 2000	1.85 m (6 ft 1 in)	65 kg (143 lb)	310 cm (120 in)	300 cm (120 in)	(China) Fujian
9	Sun Yuqing	18 February 2001	1.87 m (6 ft 2 in)	63 kg (139 lb)	320 cm (130 in)	310 cm (120 in)	(China) Liaoning
10	Cui Meichen	17 September 2000	1.88 m (6 ft 2 in)	73 kg (161 lb)	300 cm (120 in)	290 cm (110 in)	(China) Bayi
11	Sun Pingyuan	6 April 2001	1.86 m (6 ft 1 in)	68 kg (150 lb)	304 cm (120 in)	298 cm (117 in)	(China) Henan
12	Zhang Zihan	2 May 2000	1.84 m (6 ft 0 in)	75 kg (165 lb)	291 cm (115 in)	282 cm (111 in)	(China) Henan
14	Chen Fanglin (C)	2 September 2000	1.80 m (5 ft 11 in)	67 kg (148 lb)	310 cm (120 in)	300 cm (120 in)	(China) Shanghai

=== Notable players ===
- Yuan Xinyue (2012–2013)
- Gong Xiangyu (2012–2013) as a setter
- Li Yingying (2014–2015)
