= Midori =

Midori (みどり, ミドリ, 緑, 翠, pronounced [miꜜdoɾi]) is the Japanese word for "green" and may refer to:

== Places ==
- Midori, Gunma
- Midori-ku, Chiba
- Midori-ku, Nagoya
- Midori-ku, Sagamihara
- Midori-ku, Saitama
- Midori-ku, Yokohama

== People ==
=== Given name ===
- Midori (actress) (Michele Watley, born 1968), American pornographic actress
- Midori (author), Japanese author on human sexuality
- Midori (violinist) (Midori Gotō (五嶋 みどり; born 1971), Japanese-American violinist
- Midori Furusawa (古澤 緑; born 1974), Japanese cross-country skier
- Midori Francis, (1994) American actress
- Midori Honda (本田 美登里; born 1964), Japanese football manager
- Midori Ishii (石井 みどり; born 1949), Japanese politician
- Midori Ito (伊藤 みどり; born 1969), Japanese former figure skater
- Midori Kahata|, (1995), Japanese group rhythmic gymnast
- Midori Katō (加藤 みどり; born 1939), Japanese voice actress
- Midori Kinouchi (木之内 みどり; born 1957), Japanese idol
- Midori Kiuchi (木内 みどり; 1950–2019), Japanese actress
- Midori Kudoh (工藤 みのり; born 1967), Japanese curler
- Midori Kono Thiel, (1933), Japanese American calligrapher
- Midori Kuzuoka (葛岡 碧; born 1984), Japanese model
- Midori Matsushima (松島 みどり; born 1956), Japanese politician
- Midori Matsuya (松谷 翠; 1943–1994), Japanese pianist
- Midori Miura (三浦 みどり; 1947–2012), Japanese translator
- Midori Naka (仲 みどり; 1909–1945), Japanese stage actress
- Midori Seiler, (born 1969), German-Japanese violinist
- Midori Shimizu (disambiguation)
- Midori Shintani (horticulturalist) (新谷 みどり), Japanese horticulturalist
- Midori Shintani (薪谷 翠; 1980), Japanese judo wrestler
- Midori Snyder, an American fantasy author
- Midori Suzuki (disambiguation)
- Midori Tanaka, Japanese athlete
- Midori Takada (高田 みどり; born 1951), Japanese composer
- Midori Takahashi (高橋 翠; born 1980), Japanese volleyball player
- Midori Tatematsu (立松 緑; born 1988), Japanese musician
- Midori Tateyama, (born 1980), Japanese game scriptwriter
- Midori Yajima (谷島 緑; born 1979), Japanese sport shooter

=== Surname ===
- Mako Midori (緑 魔子; born 1944), Japanese actress
- Yurie Midori (緑 友利恵; born 1991), Japanese actress and gravure idol
- Kenji Midori (緑 健児; born 1962), Japanese karate instructor

== Technology ==
- Midori (operating system), the code name for an operating system that was being developed at Microsoft
- Midori (web browser), a web browser based on Electron and part of Xfce
- Midori and Midori-2 (or Advanced Earth Observing Satellite), two satellites launched by the Japan Aerospace Exploration Agency

== Entertainment and arts ==
- Midori (band), a Japanese jazz-punk fusion band
- Midori (1992 film), a 1992 anime film
- Midori Days, a manga and anime series and its title character Midori Kasugano

=== Fictional characters ===
- Midori, a mecha in the anime series Lagrange: The Flower of Rin-ne
- Midori, the main character of the novel series .hack//CELL
- Midori, an enemy character in the video game The Punisher
- Midori Asakusa (浅草みどり), a character in the anime and manga series Keep Your Hands Off Eizouken!
- Midori Chitose, a character in the visual novel and anime Green Green
- Midori Gurin, a character from the video game Yandere Simulator
- Midori Ishizaka (née Yoshinaga), a character from the manga and anime series Crayon Shin-chan
- Midori Kobayashi, a character in the novel Norwegian Wood
- Midori Nagumo (南雲美鳥), a protagonist of the manga and anime series CITY
- Midori Nishizono, a character in the visual novel and anime Little Busters!
- Midori Sawatari (猿渡 美鳥), a character from School Babysitters
- Midori Sugiura, a character in the manga and anime series My-Hime and My-Otome
- Midori Takamine (高峯 翠), a character from the idol rhythm game Ensemble Stars!
- Midori Yamabuki (also known as Midori Norimaki), a character in the manga and anime series Dr. Slump
- Midori Yamada, a character in the multimedia project Ikizulive! Love Live! Bluebird
- Sapphire Kawashima (nicknamed "Midori"), a character from the novel and anime series Hibike! Euphonium

== Other ==
- Midori (train), a train service operating in Japan
- Midori (liqueur), a bright green, melon-flavored liqueur made by Suntory
