= Lee Yeon-ju =

Lee Yeon-ju or Lee Yeon Joo (이연주) or Ri Yon-ju (리연주) may refer to:

- Lee Yeon-ju (speed skater) (born 1964), South Korean speed skater
- Lee Yeon-ju (volleyball) (born 1990), South Korean volleyball player
- Lee Yeon Joo (born 1983), South Korean planetary scientist
