= Minori (given name) =

- Pronunciation: (MEE-no-ree)
- Gender: Unisex
- Language: Japanese

Origin
- Meaning: Different meanings depending on the kanji used
- Region of origin: Japan

Other names
- Related names: Mimori; Midori

Minori is a unisex Japanese given name. Notable people with the name include:

- Minori Chiba (千葉 美乃梨; born 1988), Japanese announcer for NHK
- Minori Chihara (茅原 実里; born 1980), Japanese voice actress and singer
- Minori Haruki (春木 三憲; born 1999), Japanese artistic gymnast
- Minori Hayakari (早狩実紀; born 1972), Japanese runner
- Minori Kimura (樹村 みのり; born 1949), Japanese manga artist
- Minori Kishi (born 1998), Japanese footballer
- Minori Matsushima (松島 みのり; born 1940), Japanese voice actress
- Minori Mori (森 美乃里; born 1957), Japanese javelin thrower
- Minori Naito (内藤 実穂; born 1994), Japanese softball player
- Minori Sasaki (佐々木 海法; born 2005), Japanese shogi player
- Minori Sato (佐藤 穣; born 1991), Japanese male footballer
- Minori Suzuki (鈴木 みのり; born 1997), Japanese voice actress and singer
- Minori Suzuki (curler) (鈴木みのり; born 2001), Japanese curler
- Minori Terada (寺田 農; born 1940), Japanese actor
- Minori Yamamoto (water polo) (山本実乃里; born 1997), Japanese water polo player

== Fictional characters ==
- Minori Amanohara (天之原みのり), a character from the video game series Arcana Heart
- Minori Asuka (飛鳥みのり), a character from the anime series Ojamajo Doremi
- Minori Hanasato (花里 みのり), a character from the video game Hatsune Miku: Colorful Stage!!
- Minori Hyuuga (日向 みのり), a character from the anime series Futari wa Pretty Cure Splash Star
- Minori Ichinose (一之瀬みのり; also known as Cure Papaya), a character from the anime series Tropical-Rouge! Pretty Cure
- Minori Kudou (九島 光宣), a character from the light novel series The Irregular at Magic High School
- Minori Kushieda (櫛枝 実乃梨), a character from the light novel series Toradora!
- Minori Watanabe (渡辺 みのり), a character from the idol game series THE iDOLM@STER SideM

== See also ==
- Minoru
- Minori (disambiguation)
