= 2017 VTV International Women's Volleyball Cup =

Tournament details
- Host country: Vietnam
- Dates: July 8 – July 15
- Teams: 7
- Venue: 1 (in 1 host city)

Final positions
- Champions: Japan U23 (3rd title)

Tournament awards
- MVP: (Japan) Yuka Imamura

The 2017 VTV Cup Championship is the 14th staging of the international tournament. The tournament will held in Hải Dương, Vietnam.

== Pool composition ==
7 teams are set to participate at the tournament.

- Vietnam (hosts)
- Vietnam U18 (hosts)
- Indonesia
- Thailand U18
- Japan U23
- (South Korea) Suwon City
- (China) Beijing University

== Preliminary round ==
- All times are Vietnam Standard Time (UTC+07:00)

=== Group A ===
Pos	Team	Pld	W	L	Pts	SW	SL	SR	SPW	SPL	SPR	Qualification
1	Vietnam	2	2	0	6	6	0	MAX	150	99	1.515	Semifinals
2	(South Korea) Suwon City	2	1	1	2	3	5	0.600	146	187	0.781	Semifinals
3	(China) Beijing University	2	0	2	1	2	6	0.333	168	178	0.944	

Date	Time		Score		Set 1	Set 2	Set 3	Set 4	Set 5	Total	Report
8 July	19:30	Vietnam	3–0	(China) Beijing University	25–21	25–18	25–17			75–56	
10 July	17:30	Suwon City (South Korea)	3–2	(China) Beijing University	26–24	16–25	19–25	26–24	16–14	103–112	
11 July	19:30	Vietnam	3–0	(South Korea) Suwon City	25–13	25–7	25–23			75–43	

=== Group B ===
Pos	Team	Pld	W	L	Pts	SW	SL	SR	SPW	SPL	SPR	Qualification
1	Japan U23	3	3	0	9	9	0	MAX	225	99	2.273	Semifinals
2	Indonesia	3	2	1	6	6	4	1.500	205	167	1.228	Semifinals
3	Vietnam U18	3	1	2	3	4	7	0.571	187	247	0.757	
4	Thailand U18	3	0	3	0	1	9	0.111	138	242	0.570	

Date	Time		Score		Set 1	Set 2	Set 3	Set 4	Set 5	Total	Report
8 July	15:30	Thailand U18	0–3	Indonesia	11–25	6–25	12–25			29–75	
9 July	17:30	Indonesia	0–3	Japan U23	8–25	10–25	16–25			34–75	
9 July	19:30	Thailand U18	1–3	Vietnam U18	15–25	25–17	16–25	20–25		76–92	
10 July	19:30	Japan U23	3–0	Vietnam U18	25–12	25–13	25–7			75–32	
11 July	15:30	Thailand U18	0–3	Japan U23	17–25	6–25	10–25			33–75	
11 July	17:30	Vietnam U18	1–3	Indonesia	12–25	12–25	25–21	14–25		63–96	

== 5-7th place ==
Pos	Team	Pld	W	L	Pts	SW	SL	SR	SPW	SPL	SPR
5	(China) Beijing University	2	2	0	6	6	0	MAX	150	101	1.485
6	Vietnam U18	2	1	1	2	3	5	0.600	165	170	0.971
7	Thailand U18	2	0	2	1	2	6	0.333	139	183	0.760

Date	Time		Score		Set 1	Set 2	Set 3	Set 4	Set 5	Total	Report
13 July	17:30	Beijing University (China)	3–0	Thailand U18	25–14	25–17	25–13			75–44	
14 July	17:30	Vietnam U18	3–2	Thailand U18	25–12	25–21	20–25	23–25	15–12	108–95	
15 July	13:30	Beijing University (China)	3–0	Vietnam U18	25–22	25–21	25–14			75–57	

== Final round ==
Semi-finals
13 July – Hải Dương
Vietnam	2
Indonesia	3
14 July – Hải Dương
Japan U23	3
(South Korea) Suwon City	0

Final
15 July – Hải Dương
Indonesia	0
Japan U23	3
3rd place
15 July – Hải Dương
Vietnam	3
(South Korea) Suwon City	0

=== Semi-finals ===
Date	Time		Score		Set 1	Set 2	Set 3	Set 4	Set 5	Total	Report
13 July	19:30	Vietnam	2–3	Indonesia	25–21	25–20	23–25	19–25	12–15	104–106	
14 July	19:30	Japan U23	3–0	(South Korea) Suwon City	25–21	25–11	25–13			75–45	

=== 3rd place ===
Date	Time		Score		Set 1	Set 2	Set 3	Set 4	Set 5	Total	Report
15 July	15:30	Vietnam	3–0	(South Korea) Suwon City	25–13	25–23	25–23			75–59	

=== Final ===
Date	Time		Score		Set 1	Set 2	Set 3	Set 4	Set 5	Total	Report
15 July	17:30	Indonesia	0–3	Japan U23	14–25	19–25	14–25			47–75	

== Final standing ==
Rank	Team
1st place, gold medalist(s)	Japan U23
2nd place, silver medalist(s)	Indonesia
3rd place, bronze medalist(s)	Vietnam
4	(South Korea) Suwon City
5	(China) Beijing University
6	Vietnam U18
7	Thailand U18

2017 VTV International Women's Volleyball Cup

Japan U23
3rd title

Team roster
Setter: 5 Mika Shibata, 7 Shiori Tsukada Libero: 9 Manami Kojima

MB: 14 Ayaka Sugi, 15 Haruka Maruo, 17 Kasumi Nojima, 18 Mami Yokota
OH: 1 Momoka Oda(C), 11 Misaki Yamauchi, 12 Arisa Inoue, 4 Nao Muranaga, 3 Yuka Imamura

Head coach
Masahiro Fujii

== Awards ==
- Most valuable player
  (Japan) Yuka Imamura
- Best outside spikers
  (Vietnam) Tran Thi Thanh Thuy
  (Indonesia) Manganang Aprilia Santini
- Best setter
  (Japan) Mika Yamauchi
- Best opposite spiker
  (Japan) Misaki Yamauchi
- Best middle blockers
  (Vietnam) Nguyen Thi Ngoc Hoa
  (Indonesia) Wilda Nurfadhilah
- Best libero
  (Japan) Manami Kojima
- Miss VTV Cup 2017
  (South Korea) Lee Yun Jung
