= Minori =

Minori may refer to:

== Places ==
- Minori, Campania, Italy
- Minori, Ibaraki, Japan
- Minori Cave, in the Philippines

== Other uses ==
- Minori (given name)
- Minori (company), a Japanese visual novel company
- Minori (train), a former Japanese train service
- Roman Catholic Diocese of Minori, Campania, Italy
