= Yūka Imamura =

Japanese volleyball player (born 1993)

Personal information
- Full name: Yūka Imamura
- Nickname: Waka
- Born: September 2, 1993 (age 33) Arakawa ward, Tokyo, Japan
- Height: 1.75 m (5 ft 9 in)
- Weight: 69 kg (152 lb)
- Spike: 295 cm (116 in)
- Block: 290 cm (110 in)

Volleyball information
- Position: Wing Spiker
- Current club: Hisamitsu Springs
- Number: 12

National team
- Years: Team
- –: Japan

Yūka Imamura (今村 優香, Imamura Yūka; born September 2, 1993) was a Japanese volleyball player who played for Hisamitsu Springs. She also played for the All-Japan women's volleyball team.

Imamura played for the All-Japan team for the first time at the Montreux Volley Masters in June 2013.

Imamura retired on April 15, 2023.

== Clubs ==
- (Japan) SundaiGakuen Junior High
- (Japan) SundaiGakuen Highschool
- (Japan) Aoyama Gakuin University (2012–15)
- (Japan) Hisamitsu Springs (2015-)

== Awards ==
=== Individuals ===
- 2013 Kantō Collegiate League (Spring) - Best Scorer, Spike award
- 2017 VTV International Women's Volleyball Cup - MVP

=== Clubs ===
- 2012 Kantō Collegiate League (Autumn) - Champion, with Aoyama Gakuin University.
- 2013 Kantō Collegiate League (Spring) - Champion, with Aoyama Gakuin University.
