= Chen Zhan =

Chinese volleyball player

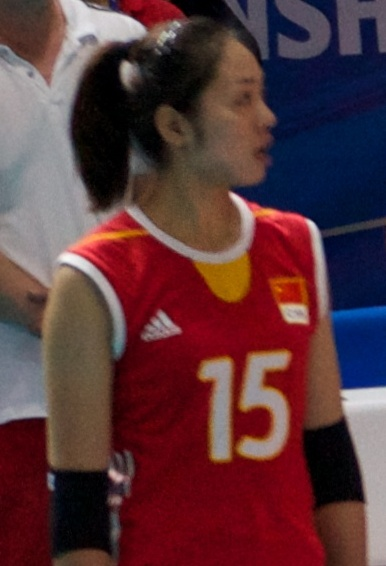
- Chen Zhan in 2014

Personal information
- Nationality: Chinese
- Born: 11 October 1990 (age 36); Nantong, Jiangsu
- Height: 1.80 m (5 ft 11 in)
- Weight: 65 kg (143 lb)
- Spike: 300 cm (120 in)
- Block: 295 cm (116 in)

Volleyball information
- Number: 15

Career
Years	Teams
2006–2018	Jiangsu

National team
2013–2016	China
Honours
Women's volleyball
Representing China
World Championship
Silver medal – second place	2014 Italy	Team
U18 World Championship
Gold medal – first place	2007 Mexico	Team

Chen Zhan (born 11 October 1990) is a Chinese retired female volleyball player. She is a member of the China women's national volleyball team and played for Jiangsu in 2014. She was part of the Chinese national team that finished in the second place at the 2014 FIVB Volleyball Women's World Championship in Italy. She was elected the Most Valuable Player of the 2007 FIVB Volleyball Girls' U18 World Championship.

== Clubs ==
- (China) Jiangsu (2006–2018)
