= Miyu Nagaoka =

Japanese volleyball player

Personal information
- Full name: Miyu Nagaoka
- Nickname: Miyu
- Born: July 25, 1991 (age 35); Miyama, Fukuoka, Japan
- Height: 1.79 m (5 ft 10 in)
- Weight: 63 kg (139 lb)
- Spike: 308 cm (121 in)
- Block: 303 cm (119 in)

Volleyball information
- Position: Opposite spiker / Wing Spiker
- Current club: (Japan) Hisamitsu Springs
- Number: 1

National team
2012–2018, 2020-2021, 2023	Japan
Medal record
Representing Japan
volleyball
Asian U18 Championship
Gold medal – first place	2007 Kamphaeng Phet	Team
Asian U20 Championship
Gold medal – first place	2008 Taipei	Team
Asian Championship
Silver medal – second place	2013 Nakhon Ratchasima	Team
World Grand Prix
Silver medal – second place	2014 Tokyo	Team
World Grand Champions Cup
Bronze medal – third place	2013 Japan	Team

Miyu Nagaoka (長岡 望悠, Nagaoka Miyu; born July 25, 1991) is a Japanese volleyball player in the position of opposite spiker. She was a member of Japan women's national volleyball team and participated at the 2016 Summer Olympics. Currently she plays with Hisamitsu Springs.

== Career ==
Nagaoka began her career at school level in local leagues, playing with Higashi Kyushu Ryukoku High School. During that period she also played with the Japanese youth national team. In 2007, they won the Asian Girls' U18 Volleyball Championship, where she was awarded MVP. In 2008, they won the Asian Women's U20 Volleyball Championship.

In 2010, she made her senior international debut, taking part in the Asian Cup with the national B-team; as well as beginning her professional career with Hisamitsu Springs.

From 2012-13 to 2016-17 seasons, Nagaoka was awarded Best 6 in V.Premier League; as well as MVP in 2012-13 and 2015-16 seasons. She was also awarded MVP at the 2014 AVC Club Championship, when her team won the tournament.

Nagaoka was selected to the national A-team in 2012. With the team she won silver medal at the 2013 Asian Championships, bronze medal at the 2013 World Grand Champions Cup and silver medal at the 2014 World Grand Prix.

In March 2017, she suffered an injury to her left anterior cruciate ligament which kept her from playing for over thirteen months, causing her to miss the entire 2017-18 season.

In 2018, she was on loan to Italian Serie A1 club Imoco Volley Conegliano. They won the Italian Super Cup, making her the first Japanese player to play and win a title with the club. Due to a new left knee injury suffered in December, she returned to her homeland for rehabilitation.

Nagaoka was back on court in 2020, but missed the 2020 Summer Olympics due to a knee injury.

== Clubs ==
- (Japan) Higashi Kyushu Ryukoku High School (2008-2010)
- (Japan) Hisamitsu Springs (2010-2018, 2019–present)
- (Italy) Imoco Volley Conegliano (2018-2019)

== Awards ==
=== Individual ===
- 2007 Asian Youth Girls Volleyball Championship - "MVP", "Best spiker"
- 2012-13 V.Premier League - "MVP", "Best6"
- 2013 Kurowashiki All Japan Volleyball Tournament - "Best6"
- 2013 Montreux Volley Masters - "Best spiker"
- 2013-14 V.Premier League - "Best6"
- 2014 Asian Women's Club Volleyball Championship - "MVP"
- 2014 FIVB World Grand Prix - "2nd Best Outside Spiker"
- 2014-15 V.Premier League - "Fighting Spirit award", "Best6"
- 2015 Asian Women's Club Volleyball Championship - "Best outside spiker"
- 2015-16 V.Premier League - "MVP", "Best6"
- 2016-17 V.Premier League - "Best6"

=== Club ===
- 2011-12 V.Premier League - Runner-Up, with Hisamitsu Springs
- 2012 Empress's Cup - Champion, with Hisamitsu Springs
- 2012-13 V.Premier League - Champion, with Hisamitsu Springs.
- 2013 Japan-Korea V.League Top Match - Champion, with Hisamitsu Springs
- 2013 Kurowashiki All Japan Volleyball Tournament - Champion, with Hisamitsu Springs
- 2013 Empress's Cup - Champion, with Hisamitsu Springs
- 2013-14 V.Premier League - Champion, with Hisamitsu Springs
- 2014 Asian Women's Club Volleyball Championship - Champion, with Hisamitsu Springs
- 2014 Empress's Cup - Champion, with Hisamitsu Springs
- 2014-15 V.Premier League - Runner-Up, with Hisamitsu Springs
- 2015 Asian Women's Club Volleyball Championship - Runner-Up, with Hisamitsu Springs
- 2015 Empress's Cup - Champion, with Hisamitsu Springs
- 2015-2016 V.Premier League - Champion, with Hisamitsu Springs
- 2016 Empress's Cup - Champion, with Hisamitsu Springs
- 2016-2017 V.Premier League - Runner-Up, with Hisamitsu Springs
- 2018 Kurowashiki All Japan Volleyball Tournament - Runner-Up, with Hisamitsu Springs
- 2018 Italian Super Cup - Champion, with Imoco Volley Conegliano

=== National team ===
- (Thailand) 2013 Asian Championship - Silver medal
- (Japan) 2013 World Grand Champions Cup - Bronze medal
- (Japan) 2014 World Grand Prix - Silver medal

==== Junior team ====
- (Thailand) 2007 Asian Youth Girls Volleyball Championship – Gold Medal
- (Chinese Taipei) 2008 Asian Junior Women's Volleyball Championship – Gold Medal

Awards
Preceded by (Serbia) Brankica Mihajlović and (China) Zhu Ting	Best Outside Spiker of FIVB World Grand Prix; 2014 (with (China) Liu Xiaotong)	Succeeded by (Brazil) Natália Pereira and (United States) Kelsey Robinson
