= Midori Shimizu =

Midori Shimizu may refer to:

- Married name of Olga Sapphire (1907–1981), Russian and Japanese ballerina and choreographer
- Married name of Midori Fumoto (born 1971), Japanese long-distance runner
