= Midori Suzuki =

Midori Suzuki may refer to:

- Midori Suzuki (educator) (鈴木 みどり, 1941–2006), Japanese educator
- Midori Suzuki (artist) (born 1947), Japanese artist living and working in Mexico
- Midori Suzuki (soprano) (鈴木 美登里), Japanese soprano
