= Lee Yeon-ju (volleyball) =

South Korean volleyball player (born 1990)

Personal information
- Nationality: South Korean
- Born: 1 March 1990 (age 36)
- Height: 180 cm (71 in)
- Weight: 71 kg (157 lb)
- Spike: 282 cm (111 in)
- Block: 270 cm (106 in)

Volleyball information
- Number: 13 (national team)

Career
Years	Teams
2009	KT&G

National team
2009	South Korea

- Lee Yeon-ju
- Hangul: 이연주
- RR: I Yeonju
- MR: I Yŏnju

Lee Yeon-ju (born 1 March 1990) is a South Korean volleyball player. She was part of the South Korea women's national volleyball team.

She participated in the 2009 FIVB Volleyball World Grand Prix. On club level she played for KT&G in 2009.
