= Midori Takahashi =

Japanese volleyball player

Personal information
- Full name: Midori Takahashi
- Nickname: Midori
- Born: March 10, 1980 (age 46); Date city, Fukushima, Japan
- Height: 1.72 m (5 ft 8 in)
- Weight: 67 kg (148 lb)
- Spike: 290 cm (114 in)
- Block: 285 cm (112 in)

Volleyball information
- Position: Setter, Wing Spiker
- Current club: Toyota Auto Body Queenseis

National team
Japan

Midori Takahashi (高橋翠 Takahashi Midori, born March 10, 1980) is a Japanese volleyball player who played for Toyota Auto Body Queenseis.

== Profiles ==
- She became a volleyball player at 10 years old.
- While attending Furukawashogyo High school, the volleyball team won the top of Japanese high school.
- In June 2011, she retired and became the team staff.

== Clubs ==
- Furukawashogyo High School → Nippon Sports Science Univ. → Japan Toyota Auto Body Queenseis (2002–2011)

== National team ==
- 2002: Universiade National team
- 2006: 6th place in the World Championship in Japan

== Awards ==
=== Team ===
- 2008 Empress's Cup - Champion, with Toyota Auto Body.
