= 2015 FIVB Volleyball Girls' U18 World Championship =

2015 FIVB Girls' U18 World Championship
Campeonato Mundial de Femenino Sub-18 Perú 2015

Tournament details
- Host country: Peru
- Dates: 7 August – 16 August
- Teams: 20
- Venues: 2 (in 1 host city)

Final positions
- Champions: Italy (1st title)
- Runners-up: United States
- Third place: China
- Fourth place: Turkey

Tournament awards
- MVP: (Italy) Paola Egonu

The 2015 Girls Youth Volleyball World Championship was held in Lima, Peru from 7 August to 16 August 2015.

== Qualification ==
The FIVB Sports Events Council confirmed a proposal to streamline the number of teams participating in the Age Group World Championships on 14 December 2013.

Method of Qualification	Date	Venue	Vacancies	Qualified
2014 NORCECA Youth Championship	22 – 30 June 2014	(Costa Rica) San José	3	Dominican Republic
2014 NORCECA Youth Championship	22 – 30 June 2014	(Costa Rica) San José	3	United States
2014 NORCECA Youth Championship	22 – 30 June 2014	(Costa Rica) San José	3	Mexico
2014 South American Youth Championship	2 – 6 July 2014	(Peru) Tarapoto	3	Brazil
2014 South American Youth Championship	2 – 6 July 2014	(Peru) Tarapoto	3	Argentina
2014 South American Youth Championship	2 – 6 July 2014	(Peru) Tarapoto	3	Peru
2014 African Youth Championship	7 – 9 Sep 2014	(Algeria) Algiers	1	Egypt
2014 Asian Youth Championship	11 – 19 October 2014	(Thailand) Nakhon Ratchasima	4	Japan
2014 Asian Youth Championship	11 – 19 October 2014	(Thailand) Nakhon Ratchasima	4	Thailand
2014 Asian Youth Championship	11 – 19 October 2014	(Thailand) Nakhon Ratchasima	4	China
2014 Asian Youth Championship	11 – 19 October 2014	(Thailand) Nakhon Ratchasima	4	South Korea
2015 Youth Pan-American Cup pool B	17 – 19 March 2015	(Cuba) Havana	1	Cuba
2015 European Youth Championship	28 March – 5 April 2015	(Bulgaria) Samokov–Plovdiv	6	Russia
2015 European Youth Championship	28 March – 5 April 2015	(Bulgaria) Samokov–Plovdiv	6	Serbia
2015 European Youth Championship	28 March – 5 April 2015	(Bulgaria) Samokov–Plovdiv	6	Belgium
2015 European Youth Championship	28 March – 5 April 2015	(Bulgaria) Samokov–Plovdiv	6	Turkey
2015 European Youth Championship	28 March – 5 April 2015	(Bulgaria) Samokov–Plovdiv	6	Italy
2015 European Youth Championship	28 March – 5 April 2015	(Bulgaria) Samokov–Plovdiv	6	Germany
World Ranking	23 April 2015	(Switzerland) Lausanne	2	Poland
World Ranking	23 April 2015	(Switzerland) Lausanne	2	Chinese Taipei
Total			20	

== Pool composition ==
The drawing of lots was held in Lima, Peru on 11 June 2015. Numbers in brackets denote the World ranking as of 23 April 2015 except the host who ranked 4th.

Pool A	Pool B	Pool C	Pool D
Peru (Hosts)	China (1)	United States (2)	Brazil (3)
Egypt (10)	Serbia (7)	Dominican Republic (6)	Japan (5)
Mexico (17)	Thailand (11)	Argentina (12)	Turkey (9)
South Korea (19)	Germany (26)	Russia (16)	Italy (12)
Chinese Taipei (14)	Poland (8)	Belgium (19)	Cuba (64)

== Venues ==
Pool A, B, Round of 16, Classification round	Pool C, D, Round of 16, Classification round
Lima, Peru
Eduardo Dibos Coliseum	Miguel Grau Coliseum
Capacity: 5,000	Capacity: 3,500

== Pool standing procedure ==
1. Number of matches won
2. Match points
3. Sets ratio
4. Points ratio
5. Result of the last match between the tied teams

Match won 3–0 or 3–1: 3 match points for the winner, 0 match points for the loser
Match won 3–2: 2 match points for the winner, 1 match point for the loser

== Preliminary round ==
- All times are Peru Time (UTC−05:00).

=== Pool A ===
Pos	Team	Pld	W	L	Pts	SW	SL	SR	SPW	SPL	SPR	Qualification
1	Peru	4	3	1	9	11	7	1.571	410	369	1.111	Round of 16
2	South Korea	4	3	1	8	11	7	1.571	381	372	1.024	Round of 16
3	Egypt	4	2	2	5	7	9	0.778	361	376	0.960	Round of 16
4	Mexico	4	1	3	6	9	9	1.000	385	376	1.024	Round of 16
5	Chinese Taipei	4	1	3	2	5	11	0.455	326	370	0.881	17th–20th round robin

Date	Time		Score		Set 1	Set 2	Set 3	Set 4	Set 5	Total	Report
7 Aug	15:30	South Korea	3–2	Mexico	17–25	25–18	20–25	25–19	15–13	102–100	P2 P3
7 Aug	18:10	Peru	3–1	Egypt	27–25	25–20	20–25	25–23		97–93	P2 P3
8 Aug	15:30	South Korea	2–3	Chinese Taipei	25–23	20–25	22–25	25–12	13–15	105–100	P2 P3
8 Aug	18:10	Peru	3–2	Mexico	22–25	25–18	21–25	25–14	15–11	108–93	P2 P3
9 Aug	15:30	Egypt	3–1	Chinese Taipei	25–22	18–25	25–21	25–20		93–88	P2 P3
9 Aug	18:10	Peru	2–3	South Korea	25–14	22–25	25–19	22–25	14–16	108–99	P2 P3
10 Aug	15:30	South Korea	3–0	Egypt	25–23	25–23	25–17			75–63	P2 P3
10 Aug	18:10	Chinese Taipei	0–3	Mexico	23–25	15–25	16–25			54–75	P2 P3
11 Aug	15:30	Mexico	2–3	Egypt	26–28	26–24	25–17	24–26	15–17	116–112	P2 P3
11 Aug	18:10	Peru	3–1	Chinese Taipei	22–25	25–21	25–15	25–23		97–84	P2 P3

=== Pool B ===
Pos	Team	Pld	W	L	Pts	SW	SL	SR	SPW	SPL	SPR	Qualification
1	Germany	4	4	0	12	12	2	6.000	340	277	1.227	Round of 16
2	China	4	3	1	9	10	5	2.000	371	323	1.149	Round of 16
3	Serbia	4	2	2	6	7	6	1.167	303	282	1.074	Round of 16
4	Poland	4	1	3	2	4	11	0.364	295	347	0.850	Round of 16
5	Thailand	4	0	4	1	3	12	0.250	284	364	0.780	17th–20th round robin

Date	Time		Score		Set 1	Set 2	Set 3	Set 4	Set 5	Total	Report
7 Aug	10:00	Serbia	3–0	Poland	25–20	25–13	25–23			75–56	P2 P3
7 Aug	12:00	Thailand	0–3	Germany	22–25	16–25	18–25			56–75	P2 P3
8 Aug	10:00	Poland	3–2	Thailand	25–21	26–28	25–10	22–25	15–13	113–97	P2 P3
8 Aug	12:00	China	3–1	Serbia	25–21	25–17	24–26	25–23		99–87	P2 P3
9 Aug	10:00	Thailand	1–3	China	26–28	13–25	25–23	16–25		80–101	P2 P3
9 Aug	12:00	Germany	3–1	Poland	25–11	25–12	20–25	25–16		95–64	P2 P3
10 Aug	10:00	China	1–3	Germany	25–19	21–25	23–25	22–25		91–94	P2 P3
10 Aug	12:00	Serbia	3–0	Thailand	25–14	25–16	25–21			75–51	P2 P3
11 Aug	10:00	Germany	3–0	Serbia	26–24	25–21	25–21			76–66	P2 P3
11 Aug	12:00	Poland	0–3	China	17–25	28–30	17–25			62–80	P2 P3

=== Pool C ===
Pos	Team	Pld	W	L	Pts	SW	SL	SR	SPW	SPL	SPR	Qualification
1	Russia	4	4	0	11	12	2	6.000	328	265	1.238	Round of 16
2	United States	4	3	1	10	11	3	3.667	328	273	1.201	Round of 16
3	Belgium	4	2	2	6	6	7	0.857	288	295	0.976	Round of 16
4	Argentina	4	1	3	3	3	10	0.300	277	305	0.908	Round of 16
5	Dominican Republic	4	0	4	0	2	12	0.167	252	335	0.752	17th–20th round robin

Date	Time		Score		Set 1	Set 2	Set 3	Set 4	Set 5	Total	Report
7 Aug	10:00	Dominican Republic	1–3	Belgium	17–25	15–25	25–16	19–25		76–91	P2 P3
7 Aug	12:00	Argentina	0–3	Russia	21–25	14–25	17–25			52–75	P2 P3
8 Aug	10:00	Belgium	3–0	Argentina	29–27	25–22	25–20			79–69	P2 P3
8 Aug	12:00	United States	3–0	Dominican Republic	25–15	25–17	25–17			75–49	P2 P3
9 Aug	10:00	Argentina	0–3	United States	20–25	19–25	23–25			62–75	P2 P3
9 Aug	12:00	Russia	3–0	Belgium	25–17	25–23	25–19			75–59	P2 P3
10 Aug	10:00	United States	2–3	Russia	25–19	20–25	25–19	23–25	10–15	103–103	P2 P3
10 Aug	12:00	Dominican Republic	1–3	Argentina	17–25	11–25	25–19	23–25		76–94	P2 P3
11 Aug	10:00	Russia	3–0	Dominican Republic	25–13	25–19	25–19			75–51	P2 P3
11 Aug	12:00	Belgium	0–3	United States	17–25	23–25	19–25			59–75	P2 P3

=== Pool D ===
Pos	Team	Pld	W	L	Pts	SW	SL	SR	SPW	SPL	SPR	Qualification
1	Italy	4	4	0	12	12	0	MAX	310	216	1.435	Round of 16
2	Turkey	4	2	2	6	7	6	1.167	280	274	1.022	Round of 16
3	Brazil	4	2	2	6	6	6	1.000	276	266	1.038	Round of 16
4	Japan	4	2	2	6	6	7	0.857	321	301	1.066	Round of 16
5	Cuba	4	0	4	0	0	12	0.000	174	304	0.572	17th–20th round robin

Date	Time		Score		Set 1	Set 2	Set 3	Set 4	Set 5	Total	Report
7 Aug	16:00	Japan	3–0	Cuba	29–27	25–6	25–17			79–50	P2 P3
7 Aug	18:00	Turkey	0–3	Italy	14–25	18–25	18–25			50–75	P2 P3
8 Aug	16:00	Cuba	0–3	Turkey	14–25	14–25	14–25			42–75	P2 P3
8 Aug	18:00	Brazil	3–0	Japan	25–19	33–31	28–26			86–76	P2 P3
9 Aug	16:00	Turkey	3–0	Brazil	25–23	25–21	25–22			75–66	P2 P3
9 Aug	18:00	Italy	3–0	Cuba	25–9	25–15	25–18			75–42	P2 P3
10 Aug	16:00	Brazil	0–3	Italy	14–25	16–25	19–25			49–75	P2 P3
10 Aug	18:00	Japan	3–1	Turkey	16–25	25–23	25–22	25–20		91–90	P2 P3
11 Aug	16:00	Italy	3–0	Japan	25–22	25–20	35–33			85–75	P2 P3
11 Aug	18:00	Cuba	0–3	Brazil	15–25	8–25	17–25			40–75	P2 P3

== Final round ==
- All times are Peru Time (UTC−05:00).

=== 17th–20th places ===
Pos	Team	Pld	W	L	Pts	SW	SL	SR	SPW	SPL	SPR
17	Dominican Republic	3	3	0	9	9	1	9.000	248	179	1.385
18	Thailand	3	2	1	6	6	5	1.200	243	233	1.043
19	Chinese Taipei	3	1	2	3	4	7	0.571	231	262	0.882
20	Cuba	3	0	3	0	3	9	0.333	243	291	0.835

Date	Time	Venue		Score		Set 1	Set 2	Set 3	Set 4	Set 5	Total	Report
13 Aug	09:00	MGC	Dominican Republic	3–1	Cuba	23–25	25–18	25–18	25–20		98–81	P2 P3
13 Aug	09:00	EDC	Chinese Taipei	1–3	Thailand	22–25	25–22	19–25	20–25		86–97	P2 P3
14 Aug	09:00	EDC	Cuba	1–3	Thailand	16–25	11–25	25–20	20–25		72–95	P2 P3
14 Aug	09:00	MGC	Chinese Taipei	0–3	Dominican Republic	17–25	14–25	16–25			47–75	P2 P3
15 Aug	09:00	MGC	Chinese Taipei	3–1	Cuba	25–20	25–14	15–25	33–31		98–90	P2 P3
15 Aug	09:00	EDC	Thailand	0–3	Dominican Republic	21–25	12–25	18–25			51–75	P2 P3

=== 1st–16th places ===
Round of 16
13 August
Germany	3
Mexico	0
13 August
United States	3
Brazil	1
13 August
China	3
Egypt	1
13 August
Russia	3
Japan	2
13 August
Italy	3
Argentina	0
13 August
South Korea	0
Serbia	3
13 August
Turkey	3
Belgium	1
13 August
Peru	0
Poland	3

Quarterfinals
14 August
Germany	0
United States	3
14 August
China	3
Russia	0
14 August
Italy	3
Serbia	1
14 August
Turkey	3
Poland	0

Semifinals
15 August
United States	3
China	1
15 August
Italy	3
Turkey	1

Final
16 August
United States	0
Italy	3
3rd place match
16 August
China	3
Turkey	0

5th–8th semifinals
15 August
Germany	3
Russia	2
15 August
Serbia	3
Poland	2

5th place match
16 August
Germany	0
Serbia	3
7th place match
16 August
Russia	3
Poland	0

9th–16th quarterfinals
14 August
Mexico	1
Brazil	3
14 August
Egypt	0
Japan	3
14 August
Argentina	3
South Korea	0
14 August
Belgium	3
Peru	1

9th–12th semifinals
15 August
Brazil	1
Japan	3
15 August
Argentina	3
Belgium	2

9th place match
16 August
Japan	3
Argentina	0
11th place match
16 August
Brazil	3
Belgium	1

13th–16th semifinals
15 August
Mexico	1
Egypt	3
15 August
South Korea	3
Peru	0

13th place match
16 August
Egypt	0
South Korea	3
15th place match
16 August
Mexico	3
Peru	1

==== Round of 16 ====
Date	Time	Venue		Score		Set 1	Set 2	Set 3	Set 4	Set 5	Total	Report
13 Aug	11:00	EDC	Egypt	1–3	China	17–25	25–21	14–25	17–25		73–96	P2 P3
13 Aug	11:00	MGC	Russia	3–2	Japan	23–25	25–19	25–17	20–25	15–8	108–94	P2 P3
13 Aug	13:00	EDC	Mexico	0–3	Germany	19–25	21–25	22–25			62–75	P2 P3
13 Aug	13:00	MGC	United States	3–1	Brazil	25–19	21–25	25–20	25–15		96–79	P2 P3
13 Aug	15:30	EDC	South Korea	0–3	Serbia	22–25	21–25	20–25			63–75	P2 P3
13 Aug	16:00	MGC	Italy	3–0	Argentina	25–16	25–21	25–23			75–60	P2 P3
13 Aug	18:00	MGC	Turkey	3–1	Belgium	25–21	23–25	25–15	25–21		98–82	P2 P3
13 Aug	18:10	EDC	Peru	0–3	Poland	22–25	17–25	17–25			56–75	P2 P3

==== 9th–16th quarterfinals ====
Date	Time	Venue		Score		Set 1	Set 2	Set 3	Set 4	Set 5	Total	Report
14 Aug	11:00	MGC	Egypt	0–3	Japan	11–25	18–25	14–25			43–75	P2 P3
14 Aug	13:00	MGC	Mexico	1–3	Brazil	20–25	25–18	17–25	18–25		80–93	P2 P3
14 Aug	16:00	MGC	Argentina	3–0	South Korea	25–15	25–17	25–21			75–53	P2 P3
14 Aug	18:10	EDC	Belgium	3–1	Peru	25–20	25–15	23–25	25–12		98–72	P2 P3

==== Quarterfinals ====
Date	Time	Venue		Score		Set 1	Set 2	Set 3	Set 4	Set 5	Total	Report
14 Aug	11:00	EDC	China	3–0	Russia	25–14	25–16	25–19			75–49	P2 P3
14 Aug	13:00	EDC	Germany	0–3	United States	19–25	11–25	20–25			50–75	P2 P3
14 Aug	15:30	EDC	Serbia	1–3	Italy	25–22	18–25	19–25	17–25		79–97	P2 P3
14 Aug	18:00	MGC	Turkey	3–0	Poland	25–9	25–15	25–16			75–40	P2 P3

==== 13th–16th semifinals ====
Date	Time	Venue		Score		Set 1	Set 2	Set 3	Set 4	Set 5	Total	Report
15 Aug	11:00	MGC	Mexico	1–3	Egypt	20–25	25–17	21–25	23–25		89–92	P2 P3
15 Aug	18:10	EDC	South Korea	3–0	Peru	25–23	25–23	25–15			75–61	P2 P3

==== 9th–12th semifinals ====
Date	Time	Venue		Score		Set 1	Set 2	Set 3	Set 4	Set 5	Total	Report
15 Aug	13:00	MGC	Argentina	3–2	Belgium	22–25	25–18	25–27	25–21	15–11	112–102	P2 P3
15 Aug	16:00	MGC	Brazil	1–3	Japan	25–21	21–25	23–25	18–25		87–96	P2 P3

==== 5th–8th semifinals ====
Date	Time	Venue		Score		Set 1	Set 2	Set 3	Set 4	Set 5	Total	Report
15 Aug	11:00	EDC	Germany	3–2	Russia	25–17	20–25	25–17	14–25	15–13	99–97	P2 P3
15 Aug	18:00	MGC	Serbia	3–2	Poland	20–25	21–25	25–8	25–21	19–17	110–96	P2 P3

==== Semifinals ====
Date	Time	Venue		Score		Set 1	Set 2	Set 3	Set 4	Set 5	Total	Report
15 Aug	13:00	EDC	United States	3–1	China	25–18	25–13	27–29	25–18		102–78	P2 P3
15 Aug	15:30	EDC	Italy	3–1	Turkey	23–25	25–23	25–18	25–14		98–80	P2 P3

==== 15th place match ====
Date	Time	Venue		Score		Set 1	Set 2	Set 3	Set 4	Set 5	Total	Report
16 Aug	16:00	EDC	Mexico	3–1	Peru	25–13	18–25	25–22	26–24		94–84	P2 P3

==== 13th place match ====
Date	Time	Venue		Score		Set 1	Set 2	Set 3	Set 4	Set 5	Total	Report
16 Aug	9:00	MGC	Egypt	0–3	South Korea	20–25	18–25	16–25			54–75	P2 P3

==== 11th place match ====
Date	Time	Venue		Score		Set 1	Set 2	Set 3	Set 4	Set 5	Total	Report
16 Aug	11:00	MGC	Brazil	3–1	Belgium	25–17	20–25	25–20	25–17		95–79	P2 P3

==== 9th place match ====
Date	Time	Venue		Score		Set 1	Set 2	Set 3	Set 4	Set 5	Total	Report
16 Aug	13:00	MGC	Japan	3–0	Argentina	25–21	25–16	25–19			75–56	P2 P3

==== 7th place match ====
Date	Time	Venue		Score		Set 1	Set 2	Set 3	Set 4	Set 5	Total	Report
16 Aug	15:00	MGC	Russia	3–0	Poland	25–14	25–18	25–16			75–48	P2 P3

==== 5th place match ====
Date	Time	Venue		Score		Set 1	Set 2	Set 3	Set 4	Set 5	Total	Report
16 Aug	11:00	EDC	Germany	0–3	Serbia	19–25	19–25	24–26			62–76	P2 P3

==== 3rd place match ====
Date	Time	Venue		Score		Set 1	Set 2	Set 3	Set 4	Set 5	Total	Report
16 Aug	13:30	EDC	China	3–0	Turkey	25–23	25–21	29–27			79–71	P2 P3

==== Final ====
Date	Time	Venue		Score		Set 1	Set 2	Set 3	Set 4	Set 5	Total	Report
16 Aug	18:30	EDC	United States	0–3	Italy	20–25	18–25	16–25			54–75	P2 P3

== Final standing ==
Rank	Team
1st place, gold medalist(s)	Italy
2nd place, silver medalist(s)	United States
3rd place, bronze medalist(s)	China
4	Turkey
5	Serbia
6	Germany
7	Russia
8	Poland
9	Japan
10	Argentina
11	Brazil
12	Belgium
13	South Korea
14	Egypt
15	Mexico
16	Peru
17	Dominican Republic
18	Thailand
19	Chinese Taipei
20	Cuba

2015 Girls' U18 World champions

Italy
1st title

Roster
Roberta Carraro, Marina Lubian, Giorgia Zannoni, Alexandra Botezat, Claudia Provaroni, Alice Pamio, Giulia Mancini, Alessia Mazzaro, Giulia Melli, Paola Egonu, Vittoria Piani (c), Alessia Orro
Head coach
Marco Mencarelli

== Awards ==
- Most valuable player
  (Italy) Paola Egonu
- Best setter
  (Italy) Alessia Orro
- Best outside spikers
  (Italy) Paola Egonu
  (China) Li Yingying
- Best middle blockers
  (Serbia) Jovana Kocić
  (Turkey) Zehra Güneş
- Best opposite spiker
  (United States) Kathryn Plummer
- Best libero
  (China) Zang Qianqian

== See also ==
- 2015 FIVB Volleyball Boys' U19 World Championship
