= 2007 FIVB Volleyball Girls' U18 World Championship =

2007 FIVB Girls Youth World Championship
Tournament details
- Host country: Mexico
- Dates: 31 July–11 August 2007
- Teams: 16
- Venues: 2 (in Tijuana / Mexicali host cities)

Final positions
- Champions: China (3rd title)

Tournament awards
- MVP: Chen Zhan (CHN)

The 2007 FIVB Girls Youth Volleyball World Championship was held in Tijuana / Mexicali, Mexico from 31 July to 11 August 2009. 16 teams participated in the tournament.

== Qualification process ==
Confederation	Method of Qualification	Date	Venue	Vacancies	Qualified
FIVB	Host			1	Mexico
NORCECA	2006 NORCECA Youth Championship	July 25 – 30, 2006	Gainesville, Florida, United States	3	United States; Dominican Republic; Puerto Rico
CAVB	2006 African Youth Championship	August 25 – 27, 2006	Tizi Ouzou, Algeria	1	Tunisia
CSV	2006 South American Youth Championship	October 3 – 8, 2006	Lima, Peru	2	Brazil; Peru
CEV	2007 European Youth Championship	April 10 – 15, 2007	Brno, Czech Republic	6	Germany; Serbia; Italy; Belgium; Russia; Turkey
AVC	2007 Asian Youth Championship	May 7 – 14, 2007	Kamphaeng Phet, Thailand	3	Japan; South Korea; China
Total				16	

== Pools composition ==
Pool A	Pool B	Pool C	Pool D
Mexico; Serbia; South Korea; Belgium	Brazil; Japan; Puerto Rico; Germany	Italy; Russia; Dominican Republic; Peru	China; United States; Tunisia; Turkey

== First round ==
All times are Mexico Standard Time (UTC−06:00).

=== Pool A ===
Pos	Team	Pld	W	L	Pts	SW	SL	SR	SPW	SPL	SPR	Qualification
1	Serbia	3	3	0	6	9	0	MAX	235	190	1.237	Pool E or Pool F
2	Belgium	3	2	1	5	6	5	1.200	250	224	1.116	Pool E or Pool F
3	South Korea	3	1	2	4	5	6	0.833	234	246	0.951	Pool G or Pool H
4	Mexico	3	0	3	3	0	9	0.000	168	227	0.740	Pool G or Pool H

Date	Time		Score		Set 1	Set 2	Set 3	Set 4	Set 5	Total	Report
31 July	13:00	Serbia	3–0	South Korea	29–27	25–19	25–17			79–63	P2
31 July	20:00	Mexico	0–3	Belgium	14–25	18–25	17–25			49–75	P2
1 August	16:00	Serbia	3–0	Belgium	29–27	25–18	25–19			79–64	P2
1 August	20:00	Mexico	0–3	South Korea	19–25	17–25	20–25			56–75	P2
2 August	14:00	South Korea	2–3	Belgium	18–25	17–25	25–23	25–23	11–15	96–111	P2
2 August	20:00	Mexico	0–3	Serbia	22–25	25–27	16–25			63–77	P2

=== Pool B ===
Pos	Team	Pld	W	L	Pts	SW	SL	SR	SPW	SPL	SPR	Qualification
1	Brazil	3	3	0	6	9	2	4.500	261	192	1.359	Pool E or Pool F
2	Japan	3	2	1	5	7	4	1.750	242	222	1.090	Pool E or Pool F
3	Germany	3	1	2	4	5	6	0.833	241	222	1.086	Pool G or Pool H
4	Puerto Rico	3	0	3	3	0	9	0.000	117	225	0.520	Pool G or Pool H

Date	Time		Score		Set 1	Set 2	Set 3	Set 4	Set 5	Total	Report
31 July	15:00	Japan	3–0	Puerto Rico	25–14	25–18	25–13			75–45	P2
31 July	20:00	Brazil	3–1	Germany	25–21	20–25	25–20	25–14		95–80	P2
1 August	14:00	Japan	3–1	Germany	14–25	25–20	25–20	25–21		89–86	P2
1 August	18:00	Brazil	3–0	Puerto Rico	25–10	25–10	25–14			75–34	P2
2 August	14:00	Puerto Rico	0–3	Germany	15–25	10–25	13–25			38–75	P2
2 August	18:00	Brazil	3–1	Japan	25–16	25–16	16–25	25–21		91–78	P2

=== Pool C ===
Pos	Team	Pld	W	L	Pts	SW	SL	SR	SPW	SPL	SPR	Qualification
1	Dominican Republic	3	3	0	6	9	6	1.500	304	304	1.000	Pool E or Pool F
2	Russia	3	2	1	5	8	4	2.000	274	233	1.176	Pool E or Pool F
3	Italy	3	1	2	4	5	6	0.833	247	236	1.047	Pool G or Pool H
4	Peru	3	0	3	3	3	9	0.333	220	272	0.809	Pool G or Pool H

Date	Time		Score		Set 1	Set 2	Set 3	Set 4	Set 5	Total	Report
31 July	15:00	Dominican Republic	3–2	Peru	15–25	25–11	18–25	25–22	18–16	101–99	P2
31 July	17:00	Italy	0–3	Russia	23–25	22–25	24–26			69–76	P2
1 August	14:00	Italy	3–0	Peru	25–17	25–12	25–22			75–51	P2
1 August	18:00	Dominican Republic	3–2	Russia	10–25	25–21	25–18	19–25	15–13	94–102	P2
2 August	16:00	Russia	3–1	Peru	21–25	25–11	25–19	25–15		96–70	P2
2 August	18:00	Italy	2–3	Dominican Republic	25–21	23–25	16–25	25–22	14–16	103–109	P2

=== Pool D ===
Pos	Team	Pld	W	L	Pts	SW	SL	SR	SPW	SPL	SPR	Qualification
1	China	3	3	0	6	9	3	3.000	279	217	1.286	Pool E or Pool F
2	Turkey	3	2	1	5	8	3	2.667	246	200	1.230	Pool E or Pool F
3	United States	3	1	2	4	4	6	0.667	220	204	1.078	Pool G or Pool H
4	Tunisia	3	0	3	3	0	9	0.000	101	225	0.449	Pool G or Pool H

Date	Time		Score		Set 1	Set 2	Set 3	Set 4	Set 5	Total	Report
31 July	22:00	China	3–0	Tunisia	25–9	25–13	25–8			75–30	P2
31 July	17:00	United States	0–3	Turkey	19–25	16–25	19–25			54–75	P2
1 August	16:00	United States	3–0	Tunisia	25–11	25–11	25–12			75–34	P2
1 August	20:00	Turkey	2–3	China	10–25	22–25	25–20	25–23	14–16	96–109	P2
2 August	16:00	Tunisia	0–3	Turkey	14–25	15–25	8–25			37–75	P2
2 August	20:00	China	3–1	United States	25–21	25–22	20–25	25–23		95–91	P2

== Second round ==
=== Pool E (1st–8th) ===
Pos	Team	Pld	W	L	Pts	SW	SL	SR	SPW	SPL	SPR	Qualification
1	Serbia	3	3	0	6	9	0	MAX	226	189	1.196	Championship round
2	Turkey	3	2	1	5	6	3	2.000	216	186	1.161	Championship round
3	Japan	3	1	2	4	3	8	0.375	232	259	0.896	5th–8th place
4	Dominican Republic	3	0	3	3	2	9	0.222	222	262	0.847	5th–8th place

Date	Time		Score		Set 1	Set 2	Set 3	Set 4	Set 5	Total	Report
5 August	16:00	Turkey	3–0	Japan	25–18	25–19	25–20			75–57	P2
5 August	18:00	Serbia	3–0	Dominican Republic	25–19	25–18	25–23			75–60	P2
6 August	16:00	Japan	3–2	Dominican Republic	25–22	25–23	24–26	23–25	15–12	112–108	P2
6 August	18:00	Serbia	3–0	Turkey	25–23	25–22	25–21			75–66	P2
7 August	18:00	Dominican Republic	0–3	Turkey	22–25	16–25	16–25			54–75	P2
7 August	16:00	Serbia	3–0	Japan	25–22	25–17	26–24			76–63	

=== Pool F (1st–8th) ===
Pos	Team	Pld	W	L	Pts	SW	SL	SR	SPW	SPL	SPR	Qualification
1	Russia	3	3	0	6	9	5	1.800	305	282	1.082	Championship round
2	China	3	2	1	5	8	3	2.667	255	227	1.123	Championship round
3	Belgium	3	1	2	4	4	7	0.571	235	253	0.929	5th–8th place
4	Brazil	3	0	3	3	3	9	0.333	246	279	0.882	5th–8th place

Date	Time		Score		Set 1	Set 2	Set 3	Set 4	Set 5	Total	Report
5 August	20:00	Brazil	0–3	China	15–25	24–26	24–26			63–77	P2
5 August	14:00	Belgium	1–3	Russia	25–14	14–25	19–25	25–27		83–91	P2
6 August	20:00	Brazil	2–3	Russia	25–22	15–25	25–22	22–25	9–15	96–109	P2
6 August	14:00	Belgium	0–3	China	23–25	17–25	19–25			59–75	P2
7 August	20:00	China	2–3	Russia	23–25	25–19	25–21	23–25	7–15	103–105	P2
7 August	14:00	Brazil	1–3	Belgium	19–25	25–17	24–26	19–25		87–93	P2

=== Pool G (9th–16th) ===
Pos	Team	Pld	W	L	Pts	SW	SL	SR	SPW	SPL	SPR	Qualification
1	Germany	3	3	0	6	9	0	MAX	225	157	1.433	9th–12th place
2	United States	3	1	2	4	3	6	0.500	192	207	0.928	9th–12th place
3	Mexico	3	1	2	4	3	7	0.429	212	232	0.914	13th–16th place
4	Peru	3	1	2	4	4	6	0.667	208	241	0.863	13th–16th place

Date	Time		Score		Set 1	Set 2	Set 3	Set 4	Set 5	Total	Report
5 August	20:00	Peru	1–3	Mexico	20–25	17–25	25–21	20–25		82–96	P2
5 August	16:00	Germany	3–0	United States	25–21	25–11	25–15			75–47	P2
6 August	20:00	Germany	3–0	Mexico	25–22	25–15	25–23			75–60	P2
6 August	18:00	United States	0–3	Peru	23–25	23–25	24–26			70–76	P2
7 August	18:00	Germany	3–0	Peru	25–19	25–9	25–22			75–50	P2
7 August	20:00	Mexico	0–3	United States	13–25	23–25	20–25			56–75	P2

=== Pool H (9th–16th) ===
Pos	Team	Pld	W	L	Pts	SW	SL	SR	SPW	SPL	SPR	Qualification
1	Italy	3	3	0	6	9	2	4.500	242	182	1.330	9th–12th place
2	South Korea	3	2	1	5	8	3	2.667	238	221	1.077	9th–12th place
3	Puerto Rico	3	1	2	4	3	6	0.500	260	241	1.079	13th–16th place
4	Tunisia	3	0	3	3	0	9	0.000	129	225	0.573	13th–16th place

Date	Time		Score		Set 1	Set 2	Set 3	Set 4	Set 5	Total	Report
5 August	14:00	Tunisia	0–3	Puerto Rico	20–25	19–25	20–25			59–75	P2
5 August	18:00	South Korea	2–3	Italy	27–25	20–25	23–25	25–18	13–15	108–108	P2
6 August	14:00	Italy	3–0	Tunisia	25–18	25–11	25–15			75–44	P2
6 August	16:00	South Korea	3–0	Puerto Rico	25–18	25–23	25–15			75–56	P2
7 August	16:00	Puerto Rico	0–3	Italy	12–25	16–25	24–26			52–76	P2
7 August	14:00	South Korea	3–0	Tunisia	25–14	25–9	25–9			75–32	P2

== Final round ==
=== 13th–16th bracket ===
Classification
2007-08-10 – Mexicali
Mexico	3
Tunisia	0
2007-08-10 – Mexicali
Peru	3
Puerto Rico	0

13th place match
2007-08-11 – Mexicali
Mexico	3
Peru	0
15th place match
2007-08-11 – Mexicali
Tunisia	0
Puerto Rico	3

Date	Time		Score		Set 1	Set 2	Set 3	Set 4	Set 5	Total	Report
10 August	20:00	Mexico	3–0	Tunisia	25–16	25–18	25–11			75–45	P2
10 August	14:00	Peru	3–0	Puerto Rico	25–22	25–23	25–22			75–67	P2

==== 15th Placement Match ====
Date	Time		Score		Set 1	Set 2	Set 3	Set 4	Set 5	Total	Report
11 August	14:00	Tunisia	0–3	Puerto Rico	17–25	18–25	21–25			56–75	P2

==== 13th Placement Match ====
Date	Time		Score		Set 1	Set 2	Set 3	Set 4	Set 5	Total	Report
11 August	20:00	Mexico	3–0	Peru	25–23	25–13	25–16			75–52	P2

=== 9th–12th bracket ===
Classification
2007-08-10 – Mexicali
Germany	0
South Korea	3
2007-08-10 – Mexicali
United States	3
Italy	0

9th place match
2007-08-11 – Mexicali
South Korea	3
United States	0
11th place match
2007-08-11 – Mexicali
Germany	3
Italy	1

Date	Time		Score		Set 1	Set 2	Set 3	Set 4	Set 5	Total	Report
10 August	16:00	Germany	0–3	South Korea	21–25	23–25	21–25			65–75	P2
10 August	18:00	United States	3–0	Italy	25–15	27–25	26–24			78–64	P2

==== 11th Placement Match ====
Date	Time		Score		Set 1	Set 2	Set 3	Set 4	Set 5	Total	Report
11 August	16:00	Germany	3–1	Italy	25–21	19–25	25–17	25–20		94–83	P2

==== 9th Placement Match ====
Date	Time		Score		Set 1	Set 2	Set 3	Set 4	Set 5	Total	Report
11 August	18:00	South Korea	3–0	United States	25–16	25–18	25–20			75–54	P2

=== 5th–8th bracket ===
Classification
2007-08-10 – Tijuana
Japan	1
Brazil	3
2007-08-10 – Tijuana
Dominican Republic	0
Belgium	3

5th place match
2007-08-11 – Tijuana
Brazil	3
Belgium	2
7th place match
2007-08-11 – Tijuana
Japan	3
Dominican Republic	2

Date	Time		Score		Set 1	Set 2	Set 3	Set 4	Set 5	Total	Report
10 August	14:00	Japan	1–3	Brazil	21–25	25–21	25–27	20–25		91–98	P2
10 August	16:00	Dominican Republic	0–3	Belgium	13–25	17–25	18–25			48–75	P2

==== 7th Placement Match ====
Date	Time		Score		Set 1	Set 2	Set 3	Set 4	Set 5	Total	Report
11 August	14:00	Japan	3–2	Dominican Republic	20–25	25–19	17–25	25–13	15–3	102–85	P2

==== 5th Placement Match ====
Date	Time		Score		Set 1	Set 2	Set 3	Set 4	Set 5	Total	Report
11 August	16:00	Brazil	3–2	Belgium	25–22	22–25	27–25	23–25	15–8	112–105	P2

=== Championship bracket ===
Classification
2007-08-10 – Tijuana
Serbia	0
China	3
2007-08-10 – Tijuana
Turkey	3
Russia	1

Final
2007-08-11 – Tijuana
China	3
Turkey	1
Bronze Medal Match
2007-08-11 – Tijuana
Serbia	1
Russia	3

==== Semifinals ====
Date	Time		Score		Set 1	Set 2	Set 3	Set 4	Set 5	Total	Report
10 August	18:00	Turkey	3–1	Russia	25–21	25–18	16–25	25–23		91–87	P2
10 August	20:00	Serbia	0–3	China	19–25	21–25	15–25			55–75	P2

==== Bronze Medal match ====
Date	Time		Score		Set 1	Set 2	Set 3	Set 4	Set 5	Total	Report
11 August	18:00	Serbia	1–3	Russia	25–17	18–25	20–25	21–25		84–92	P2

==== Final ====
Date	Time		Score		Set 1	Set 2	Set 3	Set 4	Set 5	Total	Report
11 August	20:00	China	3–1	Turkey	25–20	16–25	12–25	22–25		75–95	P2

== Final standing ==
Rank	Team
1st place, gold medalist(s)	China
2nd place, silver medalist(s)	Turkey
3rd place, bronze medalist(s)	Russia
4	Serbia
5	Brazil
6	Belgium
7	Japan
8	Dominican Republic
9	South Korea
10	United States
11	Germany
12	Italy
13	Mexico
14	Peru
15	Puerto Rico
16	Tunisia

2007 FIVB Girls Youth World champions

China
3rd title

12–woman Roster
Chen Liyi, Zuo Ting, Zhang Yichan, Cao Yiting, Mi Yang, Zhang Xiaoting, Zhao Yang, Li Hui (c), Chen Zhan, Xu Lingli, Li Jing, Xu Ni
Head coach
Wang Jiaqin

== Individual awards ==
- Most valuable player
  - Chen Zhan (CHN)
- Best scorer
  - Jolien Wittock (BEL)
- Best spiker
  - Hiroko Matsuura (JPN)
- Best blocker
  - Maud Catry (BEL)
- Best server
  - Jeoselyna Rodriguez (DOM)
- Best digger
  - Chen Zhan (CHN)
- Best setter
  - Marija Pucarevic (SRB)
- Best receiver
  - Chen Zhan (CHN)

== See also ==
- 2007 FIVB Volleyball Boys' U19 World Championship
