= 2008 Asian Youth Girls' Volleyball Championship =

Tournament details
- Host country: Philippines
- Dates: 11–18 October
- Teams: 12
- Venue: 1 (in 1 host city)

Final positions
- Champions: Japan (3rd title)

Tournament awards
- MVP: (Japan) Shiori Murata

The 2008 Asian Youth Girls' Volleyball Championship was held at the PhilSports Arena, Manila, Philippines from 11 to 18 October 2008.

== Pools composition ==
The teams were seeded based on their final ranking at the 2007 Asian Youth Girls Volleyball Championship.

Pool A	Pool B	Pool C	Pool D
Philippines (Host); Sri Lanka (7th); Australia	Japan (1st); India (6th); Indonesia	South Korea (2nd); Thailand (5th); Iran	China (3rd); Chinese Taipei (4th); Kazakhstan

== Preliminary round ==
=== Pool A ===
Pos	Team	Pld	W	L	Pts	SW	SL	SR	SPW	SPL	SPR	Qualification
1	Australia	2	2	0	4	6	0	MAX	150	124	1.210	Pool E
2	Philippines	2	1	1	3	3	3	1.000	141	121	1.165	Pool E
3	Sri Lanka	2	0	2	2	0	6	0.000	104	150	0.693	Pool G

Date	Time		Score		Set 1	Set 2	Set 3	Set 4	Set 5	Total
11 Oct	10:00	Sri Lanka	0–3	Australia	21–25	17–25	20–25			58–75
12 Oct	14:00	Philippines	3–0	Sri Lanka	25–13	25–21	25–12			75–46
13 Oct	17:00	Australia	3–0	Philippines	25–21	25–22	25–23			75–66

=== Pool B ===
Pos	Team	Pld	W	L	Pts	SW	SL	SR	SPW	SPL	SPR	Qualification
1	Japan	2	2	0	4	6	0	MAX	150	75	2.000	Pool F
2	Indonesia	2	1	1	3	3	5	0.600	149	181	0.823	Pool F
3	India	2	0	2	2	2	6	0.333	148	191	0.775	Pool H

Date	Time		Score		Set 1	Set 2	Set 3	Set 4	Set 5	Total
11 Oct	12:00	India	2–3	Indonesia	25–22	31–29	17–25	20–25	13–15	106–116
12 Oct	16:00	Japan	3–0	India	25–8	25–23	25–11			75–42
13 Oct	15:00	Indonesia	0–3	Japan	11–25	8–25	14–25			33–75

=== Pool C ===
Pos	Team	Pld	W	L	Pts	SW	SL	SR	SPW	SPL	SPR	Qualification
1	South Korea	2	2	0	4	6	2	3.000	174	135	1.289	Pool E
2	Thailand	2	1	1	3	5	3	1.667	181	132	1.371	Pool E
3	Iran	2	0	2	2	0	6	0.000	62	150	0.413	Pool G

Date	Time		Score		Set 1	Set 2	Set 3	Set 4	Set 5	Total
11 Oct	15:00	Thailand	2–3	South Korea	22–25	25–17	22–25	25–17	12–15	106–99
12 Oct	10:00	Iran	0–3	Thailand	8–25	12–25	13–25			33–75
13 Oct	13:00	South Korea	3–0	Iran	25–9	25–11	25–9			75–29

=== Pool D ===
Pos	Team	Pld	W	L	Pts	SW	SL	SR	SPW	SPL	SPR	Qualification
1	China	2	2	0	4	6	0	MAX	150	101	1.485	Pool F
2	Chinese Taipei	2	1	1	3	3	5	0.600	151	172	0.878	Pool F
3	Kazakhstan	2	0	2	2	2	6	0.333	148	176	0.841	Pool H

Date	Time		Score		Set 1	Set 2	Set 3	Set 4	Set 5	Total
11 Oct	17:00	China	3–0	Chinese Taipei	25–15	25–18	25–17			75–50
12 Oct	12:00	Kazakhstan	0–3	China	13–25	18–25	20–25			51–75
13 Oct	10:00	Chinese Taipei	3–2	Kazakhstan	14–25	25–23	22–25	25–12	15–12	101–97

== Classification round ==
- The results and the points of the matches between the same teams that were already played during the preliminary round were taken into account for the classification round.

=== Pool E ===
Pos	Team	Pld	W	L	Pts	SW	SL	SR	SPW	SPL	SPR	Qualification
1	South Korea	3	3	0	6	9	3	3.000	271	218	1.243	Quarterfinals
2	Thailand	3	2	1	5	8	4	2.000	276	213	1.296	Quarterfinals
3	Australia	3	1	2	4	5	6	0.833	216	258	0.837	Quarterfinals
4	Philippines	3	0	3	3	0	9	0.000	151	225	0.671	Quarterfinals

Date	Time		Score		Set 1	Set 2	Set 3	Set 4	Set 5	Total
14 Oct	09:00	South Korea	3–0	Philippines	25–15	25–13	25–23			75–51
14 Oct	11:00	Australia	1–3	Thailand	15–25	25–20	20–25	20–25		80–95
15 Oct	09:00	Philippines	0–3	Thailand	11–25	9–25	14–25			34–75
15 Oct	11:00	Australia	1–3	South Korea	19–25	9–25	25–22	8–25		61–97

=== Pool F ===
Pos	Team	Pld	W	L	Pts	SW	SL	SR	SPW	SPL	SPR	Qualification
1	China	3	3	0	6	9	2	4.500	255	214	1.192	Quarterfinals
2	Japan	3	2	1	5	8	3	2.667	259	191	1.356	Quarterfinals
3	Chinese Taipei	3	1	2	4	3	6	0.500	178	191	0.932	Quarterfinals
4	Indonesia	3	0	3	3	0	9	0.000	129	225	0.573	Quarterfinals

Date	Time		Score		Set 1	Set 2	Set 3	Set 4	Set 5	Total
14 Oct	13:00	Japan	3–0	Chinese Taipei	25–12	27–25	25–16			77–53
14 Oct	15:00	China	3–0	Indonesia	25–21	25–21	25–15			75–57
15 Oct	13:00	Indonesia	0–3	Chinese Taipei	15–25	5–25	19–25			39–75
15 Oct	15:00	Japan	2–3	China	21–25	22–25	25–23	25–16	14–16	107–105

=== Pool G ===
Pos	Team	Pld	W	L	Pts	SW	SL	SR	SPW	SPL	SPR	Qualification
1	Iran	1	1	0	2	3	0	MAX	75	40	1.875	9th–12th place
2	Sri Lanka	1	0	1	1	0	3	0.000	40	75	0.533	9th–12th place

Date	Time		Score		Set 1	Set 2	Set 3	Set 4	Set 5	Total
14 Oct	17:00	Sri Lanka	0–3	Iran	9–25	16–25	15–25			40–75

=== Pool H ===
Pos	Team	Pld	W	L	Pts	SW	SL	SR	SPW	SPL	SPR	Qualification
1	Kazakhstan	1	1	0	2	3	0	MAX	75	51	1.471	9th–12th place
2	India	1	0	1	1	0	3	0.000	51	75	0.680	9th–12th place

Date	Time		Score		Set 1	Set 2	Set 3	Set 4	Set 5	Total
15 Oct	17:00	India	0–3	Kazakhstan	21–25	16–25	14–25			51–75

== Classification 9th–12th ==
9th–12th places
16 October – Manila
Iran	2
India	3
16 October – Manila
Kazakhstan	3
Sri Lanka	0

9th place
17 October – Manila
India	1
Kazakhstan	3
11th place
17 October – Manila
Iran	3
Sri Lanka	0

=== Semifinals ===
Date	Time		Score		Set 1	Set 2	Set 3	Set 4	Set 5	Total
16 Oct	09:00	Iran	2–3	India	22–25	25–21	25–23	11–25	16–18	99–112
16 Oct	11:00	Kazakhstan	3–0	Sri Lanka	25–22	25–11	25–8			75–41

=== 11th place ===
Date	Time		Score		Set 1	Set 2	Set 3	Set 4	Set 5	Total
17 Oct	09:00	Iran	3–0	Sri Lanka	25–19	25–14	29–27			79–60

=== 9th place ===
Date	Time		Score		Set 1	Set 2	Set 3	Set 4	Set 5	Total
17 Oct	11:00	India	1–3	Kazakhstan	22–25	26–24	18–25	19–25		85–99

== Final round ==
Quarterfinals
16 October – Manila
South Korea	3
Indonesia	0
16 October – Manila
Japan	3
Australia	0
16 October – Manila
China	3
Philippines	0
16 October – Manila
Thailand	3
Chinese Taipei	0

Semifinals
17 October – Manila
South Korea	0
Japan	3
17 October – Manila
China	3
Thailand	1

Final
18 October – Manila
Japan	3
China	0
3rd place
18 October – Manila
South Korea	0
Thailand	3

5th–8th places
17 October – Manila
Indonesia	3
Australia	2
17 October – Manila
Philippines	1
Chinese Taipei	3

5th place
18 October – Manila
Indonesia	0
Chinese Taipei	3
7th place
18 October – Manila
Australia	3
Philippines	0

=== Quarterfinals ===
Date	Time		Score		Set 1	Set 2	Set 3	Set 4	Set 5	Total
16 Oct	13:00	South Korea	3–0	Indonesia	25–15	28–26	25–23			78–64
16 Oct	15:00	China	3–0	Philippines	25–15	25–10	25–17			75–42
16 Oct	17:00	Thailand	3–0	Chinese Taipei	25–22	25–17	28–26			78–65
16 Oct	19:00	Japan	3–0	Australia	25–14	25–7	25–11			75–32

=== 5th–8th semifinals ===
Date	Time		Score		Set 1	Set 2	Set 3	Set 4	Set 5	Total
17 Oct	13:00	Indonesia	3–2	Australia	25–23	25–21	25–27	21–25	15–11	111–107
17 Oct	15:00	Philippines	0–3	Chinese Taipei	17–25	18–25	9–25			44–75

=== Semifinals ===
Date	Time		Score		Set 1	Set 2	Set 3	Set 4	Set 5	Total
17 Oct	17:00	South Korea	0–3	Japan	18–25	21–25	11–25			50–75
17 Oct	19:00	China	3–1	Thailand	25–18	24–26	25–12	25–12		99–68

=== 7th place ===
Date	Time		Score		Set 1	Set 2	Set 3	Set 4	Set 5	Total
18 Oct	14:00	Australia	3–0	Philippines	25–12	25–18	25–21			75–51

=== 5th place ===
Date	Time		Score		Set 1	Set 2	Set 3	Set 4	Set 5	Total
18 Oct	16:00	Indonesia	0–3	Chinese Taipei	14–25	20–25	14–25			48–75

=== 3rd place ===
Date	Time		Score		Set 1	Set 2	Set 3	Set 4	Set 5	Total
18 Oct	18:00	South Korea	0–3	Thailand	9–25	22–25	20–25			51–75

=== Final ===
Date	Time		Score		Set 1	Set 2	Set 3	Set 4	Set 5	Total
18 Oct	20:00	Japan	3–0	China	27–25	25–17	25–19			77–61

== Final standing ==
Rank	Team
1st place, gold medalist(s)	Japan
2nd place, silver medalist(s)	China
3rd place, bronze medalist(s)	Thailand
4	South Korea
5	Chinese Taipei
6	Indonesia
7	Australia
8	Philippines
9	Kazakhstan
10	India
11	Iran
12	Sri Lanka

Qualified for the 2009 FIVB Girls Youth World Championship

2008 Asian Youth Girls champions

Japan
Third title

== Awards ==
- MVP: (Japan) Shiori Murata
- Best scorer: (China) Yang Jie
- Best spiker: (Japan) Shiori Murata
- Best blocker: (China) Wang Huimin
- Best server: (South Korea) Kim Mi-yeon
- Best setter: (Japan) Chisato Mitsuyama
- Best libero: (Japan) Sumiko Mori
