= 2001 Asian Youth Women's Volleyball Championship =

Tournament details
- Host country: Thailand
- Dates: 16–23 April
- Teams: 9
- Venue: 1 (in 1 host city)

Final positions
- Champions: China (2nd title)

Tournament awards
- MVP: (China) Huang Huiping

The 2001 Asian Youth Women's Volleyball Championship was held in Trang, Thailand from 16 to 23 April 2001.

== Pools composition ==
The teams were seeded based on their final ranking at the 1999 Asian Youth Girls Volleyball Championship.

Pool A	Pool B
Thailand (Host); Chinese Taipei (3rd); North Korea; Malaysia	China (1st); Japan (2nd); South Korea; India; Australia

== Preliminary round ==
=== Pool A ===
Pos	Team	Pld	W	L	Pts	SW	SL	SR	SPW	SPL	SPR	Qualification
1	Chinese Taipei	3	3	0	6	9	2	4.500	260	205	1.268	Quarterfinals
2	Thailand	3	2	1	5	8	4	2.000	282	205	1.376	Quarterfinals
3	North Korea	3	1	2	4	4	6	0.667	220	213	1.033	Quarterfinals
4	Malaysia	3	0	3	3	0	9	0.000	86	225	0.382	Quarterfinals

Date		Score		Set 1	Set 2	Set 3	Set 4	Set 5	Total
16 Apr	Thailand	3–0	Malaysia	25–5	25–7	25–11			75–23
17 Apr	Chinese Taipei	3–0	North Korea	29–27	29–27	25–11			83–65
18 Apr	North Korea	3–0	Malaysia	25–13	25–5	25–14			75–32
18 Apr	Chinese Taipei	3–2	Thailand	25–19	25–23	18–25	15–25	19–17	102–109
19 Apr	Malaysia	0–3	Chinese Taipei	5–25	12–25	14–25			31–75
20 Apr	Thailand	3–1	North Korea	25–16	23–25	25–20	25–19		98–80

=== Pool B ===
Pos	Team	Pld	W	L	Pts	SW	SL	SR	SPW	SPL	SPR	Qualification
1	China	4	4	0	8	12	0	MAX	300	173	1.734	Quarterfinals
2	Japan	4	3	1	7	9	5	1.800	317	216	1.468	Quarterfinals
3	South Korea	4	2	2	6	8	7	1.143	326	283	1.152	Quarterfinals
4	Australia	4	1	3	5	4	9	0.444	202	308	0.656	Quarterfinals
5	India	4	0	4	4	0	12	0.000	138	303	0.455	

Date		Score		Set 1	Set 2	Set 3	Set 4	Set 5	Total
16 Apr	India	0–3	South Korea	13–25	12–25	9–25			34–75
16 Apr	Australia	0–3	Japan	13–25	7–25	9–25			29–75
17 Apr	Australia	3–0	India	25–15	25–22	28–26			78–63
17 Apr	China	3–0	South Korea	25–20	25–17	25–20			75–57
18 Apr	Japan	3–0	India	25–4	25–3	25–6			75–13
18 Apr	China	3–0	Australia	25–16	25–7	25–9			75–32
19 Apr	South Korea	3–1	Australia	25–15	20–25	25–10	25–13		95–63
19 Apr	Japan	0–3	China	18–25	19–25	19–25			56–75
20 Apr	India	0–3	China	11–25	10–25	7–25			28–75
20 Apr	South Korea	2–3	Japan	25–27	15–25	25–23	25–21	9–15	99–111

== Final round ==
Quarterfinals
21 April – Trang
Chinese Taipei	3
Australia	0
21 April – Trang
Japan	3
North Korea	0
21 April – Trang
Thailand	1
South Korea	3
21 April – Trang
China	3
Malaysia	0

Semifinals
22 April – Trang
Chinese Taipei	1
Japan	3
22 April – Trang
South Korea	0
China	3

Final
23 April – Trang
Japan	0
China	3
3rd place
23 April – Trang
Chinese Taipei	2
South Korea	3

5th–8th places
22 April – Trang
Australia	0
North Korea	3
22 April – Trang
Thailand	3
Malaysia	0

5th place
23 April – Trang
North Korea	1
Thailand	3
7th place
23 April – Trang
Australia	2
Malaysia	3

=== Quarterfinals ===
Date		Score		Set 1	Set 2	Set 3	Set 4	Set 5	Total
21 Apr	Chinese Taipei	3–0	Australia	25–15	25–14	25–13			75–42
21 Apr	Thailand	1–3	South Korea	21–25	25–18	21–25	19–25		86–93
21 Apr	China	3–0	Malaysia	25–10	25–3	25–9			75–22
21 Apr	Japan	3–0	North Korea	25–14	27–25	25–20			77–59

=== 5th–8th semifinals ===
Date		Score		Set 1	Set 2	Set 3	Set 4	Set 5	Total
22 Apr	Australia	0–3	North Korea	15–25	16–25	20–25			51–75
22 Apr	Thailand	3–0	Malaysia	25–12	25–12	25–11			75–35

=== Semifinals ===
Date		Score		Set 1	Set 2	Set 3	Set 4	Set 5	Total
22 Apr	Chinese Taipei	1–3	Japan	21–25	14–25	27–25	20–25		82–100
22 Apr	South Korea	0–3	China	20–25	15–25	12–25			47–75

=== 7th place ===
Date		Score		Set 1	Set 2	Set 3	Set 4	Set 5	Total
23 Apr	Australia	2–3	Malaysia	33–31	19–25	20–25	25–15	10–15	107–111

=== 5th place ===
Date		Score		Set 1	Set 2	Set 3	Set 4	Set 5	Total
23 Apr	North Korea	1–3	Thailand	23–25	25–15	24–26	13–25		85–91

=== 3rd place ===
Date		Score		Set 1	Set 2	Set 3	Set 4	Set 5	Total
23 Apr	Chinese Taipei	2–3	South Korea	25–22	25–23	12–25	16–25	11–15	89–110

=== Final ===
Date		Score		Set 1	Set 2	Set 3	Set 4	Set 5	Total
23 Apr	Japan	0–3	China	19–25	14–25	18–25			51–75

== Final standing ==
Rank	Team
1st place, gold medalist(s)	China
2nd place, silver medalist(s)	Japan
3rd place, bronze medalist(s)	South Korea
4	Chinese Taipei
5	Thailand
6	North Korea
7	Malaysia
8	Australia
9	India

Qualified for the 2001 FIVB Girls Youth Volleyball World Championship

2001 Asian Youth Girls champions

China
Second title

== Awards ==
- MVP: (China) Huang Huiping
- Best scorer: (China) Huang Huiping
- Best spiker: (China) Huang Huiping
- Best blocker: (China) Huang Huiping
- Best server: (China) Lu Yan
- Best setter: (China) Zhang Qian

== See also ==
- Asian Youth Volleyball Championship
