= 2007 Asian Youth Girls' Volleyball Championship =

Tournament details
- Host country: Thailand
- Dates: 7–14 May
- Teams: 8
- Venue: 1 (in 1 host city)

Final positions
- Champions: Japan (2nd title)

Tournament awards
- MVP: (Japan) Miyu Nagaoka

The 2007 Asian Youth Girls' Volleyball Championship was held in Kamphaeng Phet, Thailand from 7 to 14 May 2007.

== Results ==
Pos	Team	Pld	W	L	Pts	SW	SL	SR	SPW	SPL	SPR
1	Japan	7	6	1	13	20	5	4.000	594	368	1.614
2	South Korea	7	6	1	13	20	6	3.333	614	447	1.374
3	China	7	6	1	13	19	5	3.800	565	418	1.352
4	Chinese Taipei	7	4	3	11	14	9	1.556	519	439	1.182
5	Thailand	7	3	4	10	9	12	0.750	449	443	1.014
6	India	7	2	5	9	6	15	0.400	353	468	0.754
7	Sri Lanka	7	1	6	8	3	20	0.150	256	556	0.460
8	Australia	7	0	7	7	2	21	0.095	343	554	0.619

Date	Time		Score		Set 1	Set 2	Set 3	Set 4	Set 5	Total
07 May	13:00	Thailand	3–0	India	25–20	25–19	25–15			75–54
07 May	15:00	Sri Lanka	3–2	Australia	25–20	18–25	25–23	21–25	15–13	104–106
07 May	17:00	South Korea	3–1	China	31–29	22–25	25–11	25–20		103–85
07 May	19:00	Chinese Taipei	0–3	Japan	17–25	19–25	17–25			53–75
08 May	13:00	India	0–3	China	15–25	19–25	16–25			50–75
08 May	15:00	Chinese Taipei	3–0	Sri Lanka	25–4	25–11	25–8			75–23
08 May	17:00	South Korea	3–0	Australia	25–12	25–11	25–16			75–39
08 May	19:00	Thailand	0–3	Japan	16–25	10–25	17–25			43–75
09 May	13:00	China	3–0	Australia	25–6	25–13	25–8			75–27
09 May	15:00	Japan	3–0	India	25–15	25–7	25–10			75–32
09 May	17:00	Thailand	3–0	Sri Lanka	25–10	25–20	25–7			75–37
09 May	19:00	South Korea	3–2	Chinese Taipei	22–25	25–21	25–21	23–25	16–14	111–106
10 May	13:00	Japan	3–0	Sri Lanka	25–6	25–5	25–7			75–18
10 May	15:00	India	3–0	Australia	25–19	25–21	25–20			75–60
10 May	17:00	China	3–0	Chinese Taipei	25–17	25–21	25–22			75–60
10 May	19:00	Thailand	0–3	South Korea	15–25	21–25	22–25			58–75
12 May	13:00	Sri Lanka	0–3	India	7–25	12–25	14–25			33–75
12 May	15:00	Australia	0–3	Chinese Taipei	14–25	14–25	14–25			42–75
12 May	17:00	Japan	3–2	South Korea	25–17	25–15	25–27	27–29	15–12	117–100
12 May	19:00	China	3–0	Thailand	25–22	25–16	25–19			75–57
13 May	13:00	India	0–3	Chinese Taipei	14–25	13–25	20–25			47–75
13 May	15:00	Sri Lanka	0–3	South Korea	6–25	9–25	7–25			22–75
13 May	17:00	Japan	2–3	China	20–25	20–25	25–18	25–22	12–15	102–105
13 May	19:00	Australia	0–3	Thailand	7–25	22–25	23–25			52–75
14 May	13:00	South Korea	3–0	India	25–8	25–8	25–4			75–20
14 May	15:00	Sri Lanka	0–3	China	4–25	7–25	8–25			19–75
14 May	17:00	Australia	0–3	Japan	7–25	4–25	6–25			17–75
14 May	19:00	Chinese Taipei	3–0	Thailand	25–23	25–20	25–23			75–66

== Final standing ==
Rank	Team
1st place, gold medalist(s)	Japan
2nd place, silver medalist(s)	South Korea
3rd place, bronze medalist(s)	China
4	Chinese Taipei
5	Thailand
6	India
7	Sri Lanka
8	Australia

Qualified for the 2007 FIVB Girls Youth Volleyball World Championship

2007 Asian Youth Girls champions

Japan
Second title

== Awards ==
- MVP: (Japan) Miyu Nagaoka
- Best scorer: (South Korea) Lee Yeon-Ju
- Best spiker: (Japan) Miyu Nagaoka
- Best blocker: (Chinese Taipei) Chen Shih-Ting
- Best server: (Japan) Yuki Kawai
- Best setter: (South Korea) Si Eun-mi
- Best digger: (Japan) Kotoe Inoue
- Best receiver: (Japan) Airi Kawahara
