= 1999 Asian Youth Women's Volleyball Championship =

Tournament details
- Host country: Singapore
- Dates: 4–9 June
- Teams: 8
- Venue: 1 (in 1 host city)

Final positions
- Champions: China (1st title)

The 1999 Asian Youth Women's Volleyball Championship was held in Singapore from 4 to 9 June 1999.

== Pools composition ==
The teams were seeded based on their final ranking at the 1997 Asian Youth Girls Volleyball Championship.

Pool A	Pool B
Singapore (Host); China (3rd); Chinese Taipei; Thailand	Japan (1st); South Korea (2nd); Philippines; Australia

== Preliminary round ==
=== Pool A ===
Pos	Team	Pld	W	L	Pts	SW	SL	SR	SPW	SPL	SPR	Qualification
1	China	3	3	0	6	9	0	MAX	225	107	2.103	Semifinals
2	Chinese Taipei	3	2	1	5	6	3	2.000	209	145	1.441	Semifinals
3	Thailand	3	1	2	4	3	6	0.500	150	197	0.761	5th–8th place
4	Singapore	3	0	3	3	0	9	0.000	90	225	0.400	5th–8th place

Date		Score		Set 1	Set 2	Set 3	Set 4	Set 5	Total
04 Jun	Singapore	0–3	Chinese Taipei	7–25	4–25	13–25			24–75
04 Jun	Thailand	0–3	China	9–25	11–25	9–25			29–75
05 Jun	Chinese Taipei	0–3	China	18–25	19–25	22–25			59–75
05 Jun	Singapore	0–3	Thailand	17–25	12–25	18–25			47–75
06 Jun	China	3–0	Singapore	25–8	25–5	25–6			75–19
06 Jun	Thailand	0–3	Chinese Taipei	18–25	11–25	17–25			46–75

=== Pool B ===
Pos	Team	Pld	W	L	Pts	SW	SL	SR	SPW	SPL	SPR	Qualification
1	Japan	3	3	0	6	9	1	9.000	248	114	2.175	Semifinals
2	South Korea	3	2	1	5	7	3	2.333	234	127	1.843	Semifinals
3	Australia	3	1	2	4	3	6	0.500	116	212	0.547	5th–8th place
4	Philippines	3	0	3	3	0	9	0.000	83	228	0.364	5th–8th place

Date		Score		Set 1	Set 2	Set 3	Set 4	Set 5	Total
04 Jun	Philippines	0–3	Japan	4–25	4–25	4–25			12–75
04 Jun	South Korea	3–0	Australia	25–6	25–8	25–6			75–20
05 Jun	Philippines	0–3	South Korea	4–25	3–25	2–25			9–75
05 Jun	Japan	3–0	Australia	25–3	25–6	25–9			75–18
06 Jun	Australia	3–0	Philippines	25–15	28–26	25–21			78–62
06 Jun	South Korea	1–3	Japan	25–22	24–26	16–25	19–25		84–98

== Final round ==
- The results and the points of the matches between the same teams that were already played during the preliminary round were taken into account for the final round.

=== Classification 5th–8th ===
Pos	Team	Pld	W	L	Pts	SW	SL	SR	SPW	SPL	SPR
5	Thailand	3	3	0	6	9	0	MAX	225	110	2.045
6	Australia	3	2	1	5	6	4	1.500	214	227	0.943
7	Singapore	3	1	2	4	4	6	0.667	212	216	0.981
8	Philippines	3	0	3	3	0	9	0.000	130	228	0.570

Date		Score		Set 1	Set 2	Set 3	Set 4	Set 5	Total
08 Jun	Thailand	3–0	Philippines	25–7	25–7	25–10			75–24
08 Jun	Australia	3–1	Singapore	25–20	26–24	21–25	25–21		97–90
09 Jun	Singapore	3–0	Philippines	25–13	25–16	25–15			75–44
09 Jun	Thailand	3–0	Australia	25–10	25–9	25–20			75–39

=== Championship ===
Pos	Team	Pld	W	L	Pts	SW	SL	SR	SPW	SPL	SPR
1	China	3	3	0	6	9	2	4.500	257	225	1.142
2	Japan	3	2	1	5	8	6	1.333	308	294	1.048
3	Chinese Taipei	3	1	2	4	5	7	0.714	257	262	0.981
4	South Korea	3	0	3	3	2	9	0.222	227	268	0.847

Date		Score		Set 1	Set 2	Set 3	Set 4	Set 5	Total
08 Jun	China	3–0	South Korea	25–23	25–21	25–20			75–64
08 Jun	Japan	3–2	Chinese Taipei	25–21	25–23	20–25	23–25	15–9	108–103
09 Jun	Chinese Taipei	3–1	South Korea	25–18	25–17	20–25	25–19		95–79
09 Jun	China	3–2	Japan	25–27	16–25	25–16	25–20	16–14	107–102

== Final standing ==
Rank	Team
1st place, gold medalist(s)	China
2nd place, silver medalist(s)	Japan
3rd place, bronze medalist(s)	Chinese Taipei
4	South Korea
5	Thailand
6	Australia
7	Singapore
8	Philippines

Qualified for the 1999 FIVB Girls Youth Volleyball World Championship

1999 Asian Youth Girls champions

China
First title
