= 1997 Asian Youth Women's Volleyball Championship =

Tournament details
- Host country: Thailand
- Dates: 14–20 April
- Teams: 8
- Venue: 1 (in 1 host city)

Final positions
- Champions: Japan (1st title)

Tournament awards
- MVP: (Japan) Midori Takahashi

The 1997 Asian Youth Women's Volleyball Championship was held at the Khanarassadornbamrung Gymnasium, Yala, Thailand from 14 to 20 April 1997.

== Results ==
Pos	Team	Pld	W	L	Pts	SW	SL	SR	SPW	SPL	SPR
1	Japan	7	7	0	14	21	2	10.500	338	126	2.683
2	South Korea	7	6	1	13	19	4	4.750	326	128	2.547
3	China	7	5	2	12	17	7	2.429	312	199	1.568
4	Thailand	7	4	3	11	12	9	1.333	245	170	1.441
5	Chinese Taipei	7	3	4	10	10	12	0.833	226	224	1.009
6	Malaysia	7	2	5	9	6	15	0.400	137	249	0.550
7	Singapore	7	1	6	8	3	19	0.158	92	302	0.305
8	Philippines	7	0	7	7	1	21	0.048	49	327	0.150

Date		Score		Set 1	Set 2	Set 3	Set 4	Set 5	Total
14 Apr	Singapore	0–3	Japan	0–15	1–15	0–15			1–45
14 Apr	Thailand	3–0	Chinese Taipei	15–5	15–7	15–9			45–21
14 Apr	Philippines	0–3	Malaysia	1–15	1–15	2–15			4–45
14 Apr	South Korea	3–1	China	15–2	15–6	8–15	15–9		53–32
15 Apr	South Korea	3–0	Chinese Taipei	15–4	15–3	15–0			45–7
15 Apr	China	3–0	Singapore	15–2	15–0	15–0			45–2
15 Apr	Japan	3–0	Philippines	15–0	15–0	15–3			45–3
15 Apr	Malaysia	0–3	Thailand	3–15	2–15	2–15			7–45
16 Apr	Malaysia	0–3	South Korea	2–15	3–15	1–15			6–45
16 Apr	Japan	3–0	Thailand	15–2	15–10	15–3			45–15
16 Apr	Singapore	3–1	Philippines	15–5	12–15	15–5	15–7		57–32
16 Apr	China	3–1	Chinese Taipei	16–14	15–12	13–15	15–10		59–51
17 Apr	South Korea	1–3	Japan	15–10	10–15	8–15	15–17		48–57
17 Apr	Thailand	3–0	Philippines	15–1	15–0	15–1			45–2
17 Apr	Malaysia	0–3	China	1–15	5–15	3–15			9–45
17 Apr	Chinese Taipei	3–0	Singapore	15–2	15–1	15–2			45–5
18 Apr	South Korea	3–0	Philippines	15–0	15–1	15–0			45–1
18 Apr	Chinese Taipei	3–0	Malaysia	15–6	15–0	15–13			45–19
18 Apr	Singapore	0–3	Thailand	2–15	3–15	0–15			5–45
18 Apr	Japan	3–1	China	11–15	15–10	15–12	15–4		56–41
19 Apr	Thailand	0–3	South Korea	4–15	9–15	10–15			23–45
19 Apr	China	3–0	Philippines	15–0	15–1	15–0			45–1
19 Apr	Singapore	0–3	Malaysia	9–15	5–15	6–15			20–45
19 Apr	Japan	3–0	Chinese Taipei	15–5	15–6	15–1			45–12
20 Apr	Malaysia	0–3	Japan	3–15	0–15	3–15			6–45
20 Apr	South Korea	3–0	Singapore	15–1	15–1	15–0			45–2
20 Apr	China	3–0	Thailand	15–12	15–10	15–5			45–27
20 Apr	Chinese Taipei	3–0	Philippines	15–3	15–0	15–3			45–6

== Final standing ==
Rank	Team
1st place, gold medalist(s)	Japan
2nd place, silver medalist(s)	South Korea
3rd place, bronze medalist(s)	China
4	Thailand
5	Chinese Taipei
6	Malaysia
7	Singapore
8	Philippines

Qualified for the 1997 FIVB Girls Youth Volleyball World Championship

1997 Asian Youth Girls champions

Japan
First title

== Awards ==
- MVP: (Japan) Midori Takahashi
- Best scorer: (Japan) Mari Ochiai
- Best spiker: (South Korea) Lee Yun-hui
- Best blocker: (Thailand) Rattana Sanguanrum
- Best server: (China) Tian Jia
