= 2005 Asian Youth Girls' Volleyball Championship =

Tournament details
- Host country: Philippines
- Dates: 24–31 May
- Teams: 9
- Venue: 1 (in 1 host city)

Final positions
- Champions: China (4th title)

The 2005 Asian Youth Girls' Volleyball Championship was held at the Mandaue Sports Complex in Mandaue City, Philippines, from 24 to 31 May 2005.

== Teams ==
The teams were seeded based on their final ranking at the 2003 Asian Youth Girls' Volleyball Championship.

Pool A	Pool B
Philippines (Host); Chinese Taipei (4th); Japan; Australia	China (1st); Thailand (3rd); South Korea; India; Vietnam

== Preliminary round ==
=== Pool A ===
Pos	Team	Pld	W	L	Pts	SW	SL	SR	SPW	SPL	SPR	Qualification
1	Japan	3	3	0	6	9	3	3.000	278	214	1.299	Quarterfinals
2	Chinese Taipei	3	2	1	5	8	3	2.667	247	208	1.188	Quarterfinals
3	Australia	3	1	2	4	4	6	0.667	198	223	0.888	Quarterfinals
4	Philippines	3	0	3	3	0	9	0.000	147	225	0.653	Quarterfinals

Date	Time		Score		Set 1	Set 2	Set 3	Set 4	Set 5	Total
24 May	13:00	Philippines	0–3	Australia	21–25	17–25	14–25			52–75
25 May	17:00	Japan	3–2	Chinese Taipei	19–25	25–15	23–25	25–20	15–12	107–97
26 May	15:00	Australia	0–3	Chinese Taipei	13–25	16–25	22–25			51–75
27 May	17:00	Philippines	0–3	Japan	17–25	16–25	12–25			45–75
28 May	13:00	Japan	3–1	Australia	21–25	25–19	25–18	25–10		96–72
28 May	17:00	Chinese Taipei	3–0	Philippines	25–14	25–18	25–18			75–50

=== Pool B ===
Pos	Team	Pld	W	L	Pts	SW	SL	SR	SPW	SPL	SPR	Qualification
1	China	4	4	0	8	12	0	MAX	300	197	1.523	Quarterfinals
2	South Korea	4	3	1	7	9	3	3.000	290	197	1.472	Quarterfinals
3	Thailand	4	2	2	6	6	7	0.857	270	283	0.954	Quarterfinals
4	Vietnam	4	1	3	5	3	11	0.273	238	324	0.735	Quarterfinals
5	India	4	0	4	4	3	12	0.250	255	352	0.724	

Date	Time		Score		Set 1	Set 2	Set 3	Set 4	Set 5	Total
24 May	15:00	India	2–3	Vietnam	25–21	17–25	18–25	25–17	14–16	99–104
24 May	17:00	Thailand	0–3	China	15–25	15–25	18–25			48–75
25 May	13:00	South Korea	3–0	India	25–13	25–14	25–18			75–45
25 May	15:00	Vietnam	0–3	Thailand	20–25	22–25	18–25			60–75
26 May	13:00	Thailand	0–3	South Korea	18–25	15–25	16–25			49–75
26 May	17:00	China	3–0	Vietnam	25–19	25–14	25–13			75–46
27 May	13:00	India	1–3	Thailand	25–23	9–25	20–25	19–25		73–98
27 May	15:00	China	3–0	South Korea	25–20	25–22	25–23			75–65
28 May	10:00	Vietnam	0–3	South Korea	9–25	7–25	12–25			28–75
28 May	15:00	China	3–0	India	25–18	25–11	25–9			75–38

== Final round ==
Quarterfinals
29 May – Mandaue City
Japan	3
Vietnam	2
29 May – Mandaue City
South Korea	3
Australia	0
29 May – Mandaue City
China	3
Philippines	0
29 May – Mandaue City
Chinese Taipei	3
Thailand	1

Semifinals
30 May – Mandaue City
Japan	0
South Korea	3
30 May – Mandaue City
China	3
Chinese Taipei	0

Final
31 May – Mandaue City
South Korea	2
China	3
3rd place
31 May – Mandaue City
Japan	2
Chinese Taipei	3

5th–8th places
30 May – Mandaue City
Vietnam	1
Australia	3
30 May – Mandaue City
Philippines	0
Thailand	3

5th place
31 May – Mandaue City
Australia	0
Thailand	3
7th place
31 May – Mandaue City
Vietnam	3
Philippines	0

=== Quarterfinals ===
Date	Time		Score		Set 1	Set 2	Set 3	Set 4	Set 5	Total
29 May	10:00	Chinese Taipei	3–1	Thailand	22–25	25–16	25–22	25–17		97–80
29 May	13:00	Japan	3–2	Vietnam	25–23	25–16	24–26	18–25	15–11	107–101
29 May	15:00	South Korea	3–0	Australia	25–7	26–24	25–15			76–46
29 May	17:00	China	3–0	Philippines	25–10	25–9	25–5			75–24

=== 5th–8th semifinals ===
Date	Time		Score		Set 1	Set 2	Set 3	Set 4	Set 5	Total
30 May	10:00	Philippines	0–3	Thailand	14–25	14–25	11–25			39–75
30 May	13:00	Vietnam	1–3	Australia	25–19	22–25	19–25	21–25		87–94

=== Semifinals ===
Date	Time		Score		Set 1	Set 2	Set 3	Set 4	Set 5	Total
30 May	15:00	China	3–0	Chinese Taipei	25–17	25–20	25–10			75–47
30 May	17:00	Japan	0–3	South Korea	16–25	16–25	20–25			52–75

=== 7th place ===
Date	Time		Score		Set 1	Set 2	Set 3	Set 4	Set 5	Total
31 May	10:00	Vietnam	3–0	Philippines	25–16	25–19	25–14			75–49

=== 5th place ===
Date	Time		Score		Set 1	Set 2	Set 3	Set 4	Set 5	Total
31 May	13:00	Australia	0–3	Thailand	14–25	23–25	18–25			55–75

=== 3rd place ===
Date	Time		Score		Set 1	Set 2	Set 3	Set 4	Set 5	Total
31 May	15:00	Japan	2–3	Chinese Taipei	25–21	25–19	21–25	22–25	12–15	105–105

=== Final ===
Date	Time		Score		Set 1	Set 2	Set 3	Set 4	Set 5	Total
31 May	17:00	South Korea	2–3	China	22–25	25–23	25–23	25–27	9–15	106–113

== Final standing ==
Rank	Team
1st place, gold medalist(s)	China
2nd place, silver medalist(s)	South Korea
3rd place, bronze medalist(s)	Chinese Taipei
4	Japan
5	Thailand
6	Australia
7	Vietnam
8	Philippines
9	India

Qualified for the 2005 FIVB Girls Youth Volleyball World Championship

2005 Asian Youth Girls champions

China
Fourth title

== Awards ==
- MVP:
- Best scorer: Kim Yeon-Koung (KOR)
- Best spiker:
- Best blocker:
- Best server:
- Best setter:
- Best receiver: Kim Yeon-Koung (KOR)
- Best libero:
