= Eastern Asian Volleyball Association =

Zonal association of volleyball in East Asia

- Abbreviation: EAVA
- Formation: December 1993; 32 years ago
- Type: Volleyball organisation
- Headquarters: Beijing, China
- Region served: East Asia
- Members: 8 national federations
- Official languages: English
- President: Yuan Lei
- Parent organization: Asian Volleyball Confederation

The Eastern Asian Volleyball Association (EAVA) is one of five zonal associations of governance in volleyball within the Asian Volleyball Confederation (AVC). It governs indoor volleyball and beach volleyball in East Asia. EAVA consists of 8 national federation members which are full members with the Fédération Internationale de Volleyball (FIVB). Among these, 7 national federations represent the National Olympic Committees (NOCs) of their respective countries and dependent territories, allowing them to participate in the Olympic Games.

EAVA consists of the national volleyball federations of East Asia and run zonal championships including the Eastern Asian Men's Volleyball Championship and Eastern Asian Women's Volleyball Championship. It also promotes regional volleyball, supports the creation of national federations affiliated with FIVB, ensures compliance with FIVB regulations, plans annual activities, and reports competition results to the FIVB and confederations.

The current president, Yuan Lei, vice-president of the Chinese Volleyball Association, was elected as EAVA's president for the 2024–2028 term in Beijing, China, in March 2024. His election also secured him the position of vice-president within the continental governing body, AVC.

== National federations ==
The Eastern Asian Volleyball Association has 8 national federations.

Code	Federation	National teams	Founded	FIVB affiliation	AVC affiliation	IOC member
CHN	China	Men's; U23; U21; U19; U17; Women's; U23; U21; U19; U17	1953	1954		Yes
HKG	Hong Kong	Men's; U23; U21; U19; U17; Women's; U23; U21; U19; U17				Yes
TPE	Chinese Taipei	Men's; U23; U21; U19; U17; Women's; U23; U21; U19; U17	1954			Yes
JPN	Japan	Men's; U23; U21; U19; U17; Women's; U23; U21; U19; U17	1927	1951	1952	Yes
PRK	North Korea	Men's; U23; U21; U19; U17; Women's; U23; U21; U19; U17				Yes
KOR	South Korea	Men's; U23; U21; U19; U17; Women's; U23; U21; U19; U17	1946	1959		Yes
MAC	Macau	Men's; U23; U21; U19; U17; Women's; U23; U21; U19; U17				No
MGL	Mongolia	Men's; U23; U21; U19; U17; Women's; U23; U21; U19; U17				Yes

== Competitions ==
=== EAVA active competitions ===
National teams:

- Eastern Asian Men's Volleyball Championship
- Eastern Asian Women's Volleyball Championship

co-sanctioned competition with the East Asian Games Association

- East Asian Youth Games Volleyball Tournament (U-19)

=== EAVA defunct competitions ===
National teams:
co-sanctioned competition with the East Asian Games Association

- East Asian Games Volleyball Tournament

== Current title holders ==
=== Indoor volleyball ===
Competition	Champions	Runners-up	3rd place	Ref.
National teams (men)
Eastern Asian Volleyball Championship (2026)	South Korea	Japan	Mongolia	
East Asian Youth Games (2023)	China	Chinese Taipei	Mongolia	
National teams (women)
Eastern Asian Volleyball Championship (2025)	Chinese Taipei	China	South Korea	
East Asian Youth Games (2023)	China	Mongolia	Hong Kong	

== See also ==
- Central Asian Volleyball Association
- Oceania Zonal Volleyball Association
- Southeast Asian Volleyball Association
- West Asian Volleyball Association
