= Mami Yokota =

Japanese volleyball player (born 1997)

Personal information
- Full name: Mami Yokota
- Nationality: Japanese
- Born: 10 December 1997 (age 28) Toyota City, Aichi, Japan
- Height: 1.77 m (5 ft 10 in)
- Weight: 62 kg (137 lb)
- Spike: 298 cm (117 in)
- Block: 285 cm (112 in)

Volleyball information
- Position: Middle blocker
- Current club: (Japan) PFU BlueCats Ishikawa Kahoku
- Number: 1

Career
- Years: Team
- 2013–2016 2016-2020 2020-2024 2024-2025 2025-present: (Japan) Furukawa Gakuen High School (Japan) Tokai University (Japan) Denso Airybees (Japan) Queenseis Kariya (Japan) PFU BlueCats Ishikawa Kahoku

National team
- Years: Team
- 2019–2023: Japan
Honours
Women's volleyball
Representing Japan
Asian Championship
Bronze medal – third place	2023 Nakhon Ratchasima	Team
AVC Eastern Zonal Championship
Gold medal – first place	2018 Zhangjiagang	Team
FISU World University Games
Bronze medal – third place	2019 Naples	Team
Silver medal – second place	2017 Taipei	Team
VTV International Volleyball Cup
Gold medal – first place	2017 Hai Duong	Team

Mami Yokota (横田 真未, Yokota Mami; born 10 December 1997) is a Japanese professional volleyball player. She plays in the SV.League for PFU BlueCats Ishikawa Kahoku.

== Personal life ==
Mami's younger sister, Sayaka Yokota is also a professional volleyball player. Both sisters play in the SV.League.

== Career ==
=== Early Years ===
In her second year at Tokai University, she was selected as a member of the All Japan Universiade Team for 2017 VTV International Women's Volleyball Cup in Hai Duong, Vietnam and 2017 FISU World University Games in Taipei.

In 2018, she was a starting player in every match at the 2018 AVC Eastern Zonal Championship, leading the team to victory with 5–0 records.

In July 2019, she was also a starting player in every match at the 2019 FISU World University Games. The team finished with the bronze medal which their third consecutive medal win.

=== Professional Years ===
In November 2019, Denso Airybees announced that she would join the team in 2020, along with Tamaki Matsui and Satomi Fukudome. She made her starting player debut on October 17, in the opening match against Hisamitsu Springs.

In 2022, she was selected as a member of Japan women's national volleyball team for the first time. She made her starting player debut in VNL match against Poland on June 14. She was also selected for 2022 World Championship.

In 2023, she was selected for 2023 Asian Championship in Thailand where the team won the bronze medal.

In 2024, it was announced that she would leave Denso at the end of 2023–24 season. In June the same year, it was announced that she would join Queenseis Kariya along with her sister Sayaka and Ayano Sato.

In May 2025, it was announced that she would leave Queenseis. In June the same year, it was announced that she would join PFU BlueCats Ishikawa Kahoku.

== Award ==
=== Individual ===
- 2017-18 East Japan Intercollegiate Championship - Best Server
- 2019-20 All Japan Intercollegiate Championship - Middle Blocker MIP
- 2020-21 V.League Division 1 Women's - Best Newcomer
- 2021-22 V.League Division 1 Women's - Fair Play

=== University Team ===
- 2016-17 Kanto University Autumn League - - Bronze Medal, with Tokai University
- 2016-17 Kanto University Spring League - - Runner-up, with Tokai University
- 2017-18 Kanto University Autumn League - - Champion, with Tokai University
- 2017-18 East Japan Intercollegiate Championship - - Bronze Medal, with Tokai University
- 2018-19 Kanto University Autumn League - - Champion, with Tokai University
- 2018-19 Kanto University Spring League, - Champion, with Tokai University
- 2019-20 All Japan Intercollegiate Championship - - Bronze Medal, with Tokai University
- 2019-20 Kanto University Autumn League - - Champion, with Tokai University

=== Club Team ===
- 2020-21 Empress' Cup All Japan Volleyball Championship - - Bronze Medal, with Denso Airybees
- 2023-24 Kurowashiki All Japan Volleyball Tournament - - Runner-up, with Denso Airybees

=== National Team ===
- (Chinese Taipei) 2017 FISU World University Games - - Runner-up
- (Vietnam) 2017 VTV International Volleyball Cup - - Champion
- (China) 2018 AVC Eastern Zonal Championship - - Champion
- (Italy) 2019 FISU World University Games - - Bronze Medal
- (Thailand) 2023 Asian Championship - - Bronze Medal
