= 2023 Asian Women's Volleyball Championship squads =

This article shows the roster of all participating teams at the 2023 Asian Women's Volleyball Championship.

== Pool A ==
=== Thailand ===
The following is Thailand's roster in the 2023 Women's Championship.

Head coach: Danai Sriwatcharamethakul

- 1 Wipawee Srithong OH
- 2 Piyanut Pannoy L
- 3 Pornpun Guedpard S
- 5 Thatdao Nuekjang MB
- 12 Hattaya Bamrungsuk MB
- 16 Pimpichaya Kokram OP
- 17 Sasipapron Janthawisut OH
- 18 Ajcharaporn Kongyot OH
- 19 Chatchu-on Moksri OH
- 20 Supattra Pairoj L
- 21 Thanacha Sooksod OP
- 23 Sirima Manakij S
- 29 Wimonrat Thanapan MB
- 99 Jarasporn Bundasak MB

=== Australia ===
The following is Australia's roster in the 2023 Women's Championship.

Head coach: Nicole Hannan

- 1 Tara Maland L
- 2 Emily Heintzelman L
- 3 Mikaela Stevens S
- 6 Stefanie Weiler OH
- 8 Kara Inskip MB
- 9 Emma Burton OP
- 10 Laura Reeks S
- 11 Cassandra Dodd MB
- 12 Lauren Cox MB
- 13 Beth Carey MB
- 15 Annelies Jones OH
- 16 Charlotte White OH
- 22 Rebecca Redgen OH

=== Mongolia ===
The following is Mongolia's roster in the 2023 Women's Championship.

Head coach: Kherlen Batdorj

- 1 Khongorzul Gan-Ochir OP
- 2 Enkhlen Purevsuren MB
- 3 Khandsuren Gantogtokh MB
- 4 Enkhnaran Ganbold OP
- 5 Sosorburam Dashdavaa L
- 8 Baasanjav Naranbaatar L
- 9 Khosbayar Lkhagwadorj S
- 11 Tsetsegjargal Ganbold OP
- 13 Khuslen Enkhbold OP
- 14 Temuulen Sansarbold MB
- 19 Munkhzaya Namshir OH
- 23 Nasanjargal Bayarchuluun OH
- 24 Enkhamaa Idermunkh OP

== Pool B ==
=== Japan ===
The following is Japan's roster in the 2023 Women's Championship.

Head coach: Takayuki Kaneko

- 1 Kyoko Hayashi MB
- 2 Haruyo Shimamura MB
- 3 Yuka Sato OH
- 4 Manami Kojima L
- 5 Mami Yokota MB
- 6 Hawi Okumu Oba OH
- 7 Miwako Osanai OH
- 8 Erina Ogawa MB
- 9 Miiku Iwasawa L
- 10 Tsukasa Nakagawa S
- 11 Yuki Nishikawa OH
- 12 Rui Nonaka OH
- 15 Miyu Nakagawa OH
- 17 Aki Momii S

=== Iran ===
The following is Iran's roster in the 2023 Women's Championship.

Head coach: Fatemeh Rashidi

=== India ===
The following is India's roster in the 2023 Women's Championship.

Head coach: Ajit Patil

== Pool C ==
=== South Korea ===
The following is South Korea's roster in the 2023 Women's Championship.

Head coach: (Spain) César Hernández González

- 2 Lee Ju-ah MB
- 5 Kim Da-in S
- 6 Park Eun-jin MB
- 7 Kim Ji-won S
- 8 Kim Yeong-yeon L
- 12 Moon Jung-won L
- 13 Park Jeong-ah OH
- 14 Lee Da-hyeon MB
- 15 Lee Seon-woo OP
- 17 Jung Ho-young MB
- 19 Pyo Seung-ju OH
- 23 Kwon Min-ji OH
- 28 Lee Han-bi OH
- 97 Kang So-hwi OP

=== Chinese Taipei ===
The following is Chinese Taipei's roster in the 2023 Women's Championship.

Head coach: Chen Yu-an

=== Vietnam ===
The following is Vietnam's roster in the 2023 Women's Championship.

Head coach: Nguyễn Tuấn Kiệt

- 1 Lê Thị Thanh Liên L
- 3 Trần Thị Thanh Thúy OH
- 8 Phạm Thị Nguyệt Anh OH
- 9 Trần Thị Bích Thủy MB
- 11 Hoàng Thị Kiều Trinh OP
- 12 Nguyễn Khánh Đang L
- 14 Võ Thị Kim Thoa S
- 15 Nguyễn Thị Trinh MB
- 16 Vi Thị Như Quỳnh OH
- 17 Đoàn Thị Xuân OP
- 18 Phạm Thị Hiền MB
- 19 Đoàn Thị Lâm Oanh S
- 20 Trần Tú Linh OH
- 22 Lý Thị Luyến MB

=== Uzbekistan ===
The following is Uzbekistan's roster in the 2023 Women's Championship.

Head coach: Azat Kazakov

== Pool D ==
=== China ===
The following is China's roster in the 2023 Women's Championship.

Head coach: Zhao Yong

- 1 Duan Fang OH
- 2 Wang Yizhu OH
- 3 Yu Jiarui S
- 4 Xu Jianan L
- 5 Wu Mengjie OH
- 7 Zhong Hui OH
- 8 Xu Xiaoting S
- 9 Wu Xinyu L
- 10 Wang Wenhan MB
- 11 Zhou Yetong OP
- 12 Miao Yiwen OP
- 15 Liu Yu MB
- 16 Cao Tingting MB
- 19 Yang Hanyu MB

=== Kazakhstan ===
The following is Kazakhstan's roster in the 2023 Women's Championship.

Head coach: Vladimir Anikonov

- 2 Sana Anarkulova OH
- 4 Zhanna Syroyeshkina OH
- 6 Nailya Nigmatulina S
- 7 Yuliya Yakimova MB
- 9 Valeriya Chumak MB
- 12 Kristina Strukova OH
- 14 Svetlana Nikolayeva OH
- 15 Madina Beket L
- 16 Tatyana Nikitina OP
- 18 Kristina Anikonova MB
- 21 Tomiris Sagimbayeva L
- 27 Nataliya Smirnova MB
- 29 Kristina Belova OP
- 99 Dinara Kozhanberdina S

=== Hong Kong ===
The following is Hong Kong's roster in the 2023 Women's Championship.

Head coach: Kwok Kin Chuen

=== Philippines ===
The following is Philippines's roster in the 2023 Women's Championship.

Head coach: (Brazil) Jorge Edson

- 1 Natasza Kaye Bombita OH
- 2 Pearl Ann Denura L
- 3 Abegail Pono S
- 4 Mhicaela Belen OH
- 5 Shaira Jardio L
- 6 Evangeline Alinsug OH
- 8 Erin Pangilinan MB
- 12 Alyssa Solomon OP
- 13 Camilla Lamina S
- 16 Arah Ellah Panique OH
- 17 Minierva Maaya MB
- 18 Lorene Grace Toring MB
- 21 Myrtle Escanlar OH
- 24 Niña Ytang MB
