= Rui Nonaka =

Japanese volleyball player (born 2001)

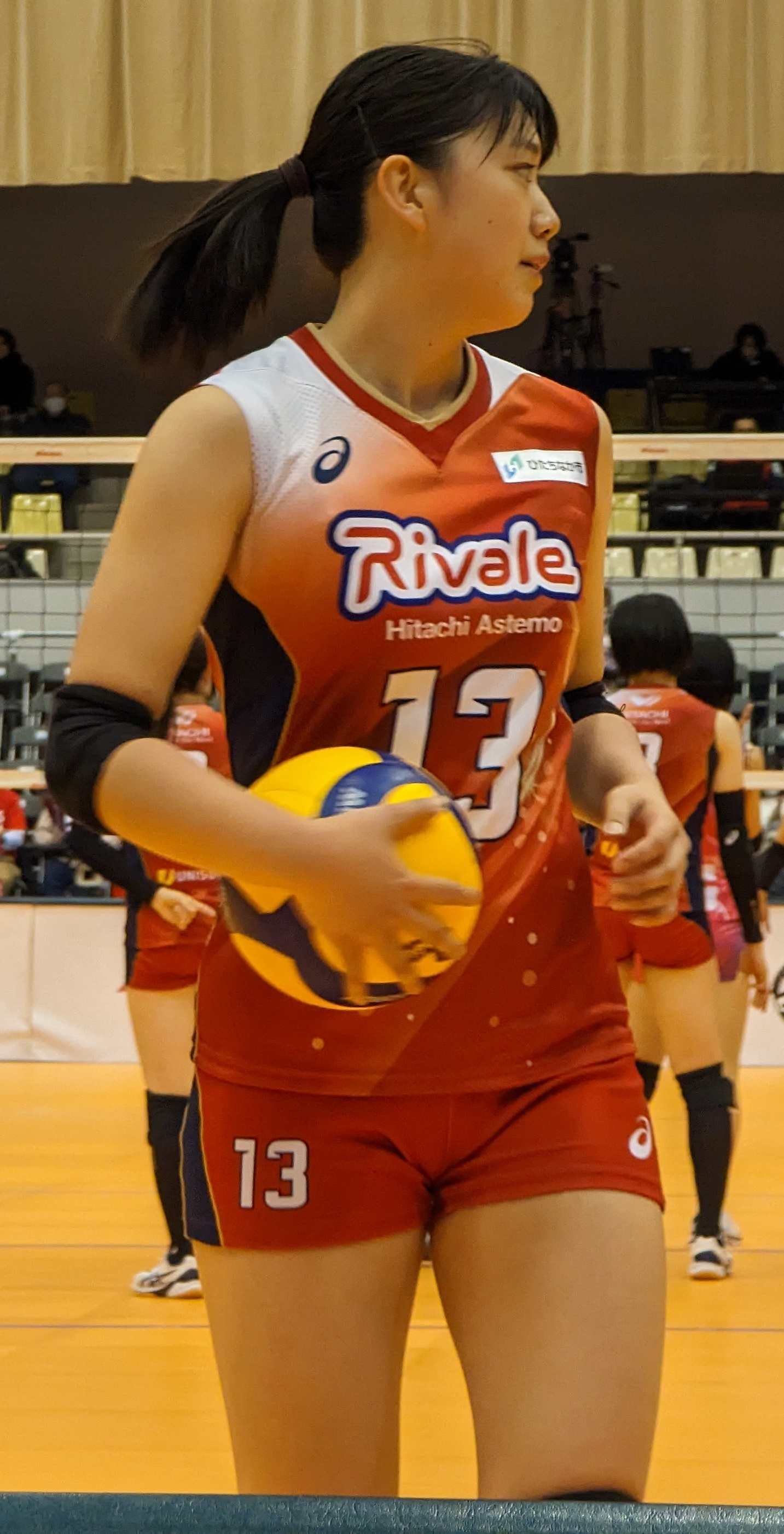

Personal information
- Full name: Rui Nonaka
- Nationality: Japanese
- Born: 3 August 2001 (age 25) Akita City, Akita, Japan
- Height: 1.77 m (5 ft 10 in)
- Weight: 67 kg (148 lb)
- Spike: 296 cm (117 in)
- Block: 280 cm (110 in)

Volleyball information
- Position: Outside hitter
- Current club: (Japan) Victorina Himeji
- Number: 24 (national); 13 (club)

Career
- Years: Team
- 2017–2020 2020–2025 2026-persent: (Japan) Akita Kita High School (Japan) Astemo Rivale Ibaraki (Japan) Victorina Himeji

National team
- Years: Team
- 2017–: Japan
Honours
Women's volleyball
Representing Japan
Asian Championship
Bronze medal – third place	2023 Nakhon Ratchasima	Team
Asian U17 Championship
Gold medal – first place	2017 Chonqing	Team

Rui Nonaka (野中 瑠衣, Nonaka Rui; born 3 August 2001) is a Japanese professional volleyball player. She plays in the SV.League for Victorina Himeji.

== Career ==
In her third year of Junior high school, Nonaka was selected to represent Japan at the 2017 U17 Championship in China where the team won the championship. She was also selected for 2017 Girls' U18 World Championship in Argentina. The team finished in the fifth place.

After graduating from Akita Kita High School, she was offered a contract with Hitachi Rivale (now Astemo Rivale Ibaraki for the 2019-20 season.

In August 2023, she was selected to represent Japan at the 2023 Asian Championship in Thailand.

In April 2025, she was selected as a member of Japan women's national volleyball team for the first time. In May the same year, it was announced that she would parted ways with Astemo Rivale Ibaraki at the end of the 2024-25 season.

In July 2025, it was announced that she would join Victorina Himeji.

== Award ==
=== Club Team ===
- 2023-24 Kurowashiki All Japan Volleyball Tournament - - Bronze Medal, with Astemo Hitachi Rivale
- 2023-24 Empress' Cup All Japan Volleyball Championship - - Bronze Medal, with Astemo Hitachi Rivale
- 2025-26 Empress' Cup All Japan Volleyball Championship - - Bronze Medal, with Victorina Himeji

=== National Team ===
- (China) 2017 Asian U17 Championship - - Champion
- (Thailand) 2023 Asian Championship - - Bronze Medal
