= Bulgantamir Sergelenbaatar =

Mongolia volleyball player

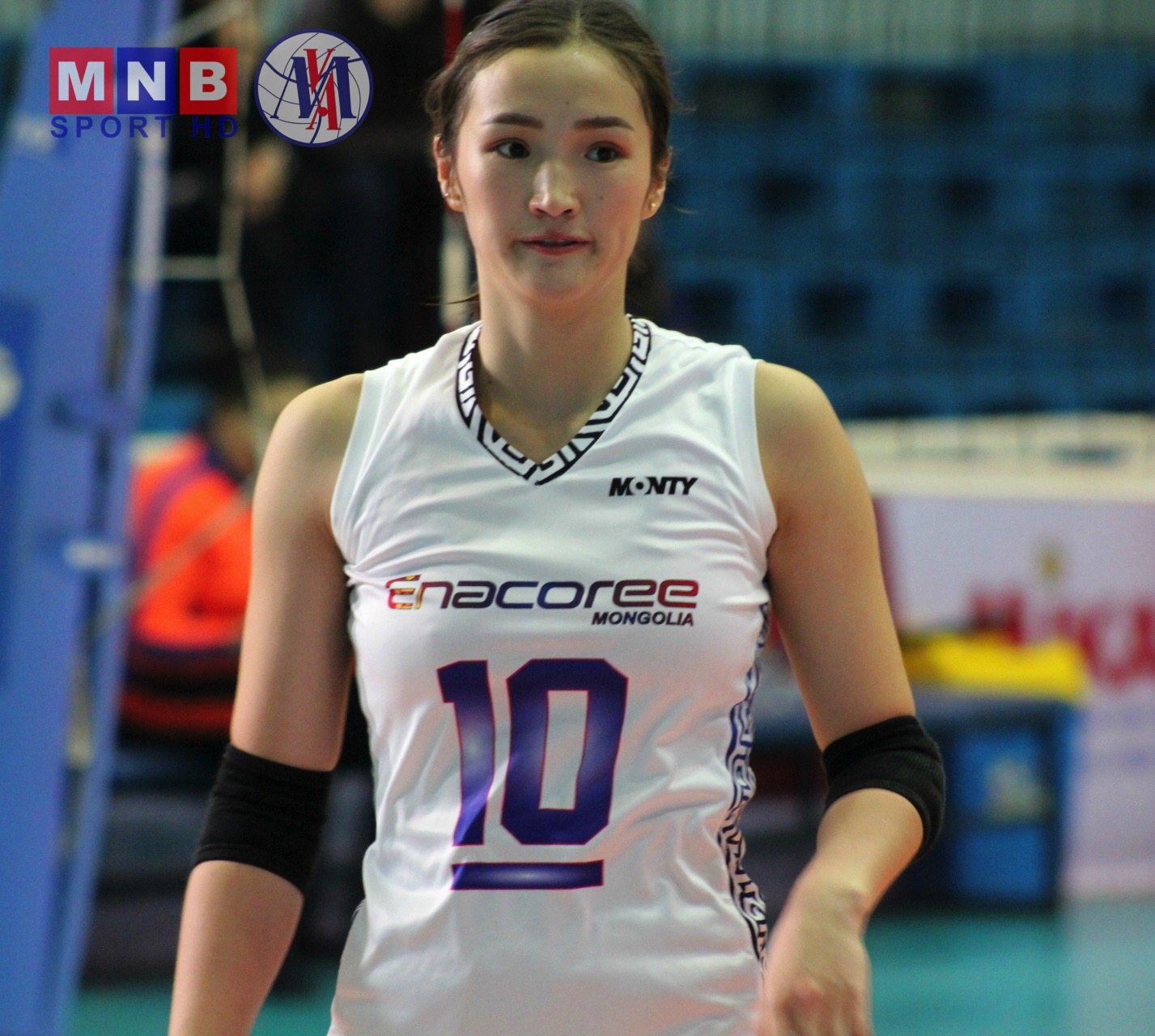

Personal information
- Full name: Sergelenbaatariin Bulgantamir
- Nickname: Tamiraa
- Nationality: Mongolian
- Born: 28 November 1999 (age 26); Bayankhongor, Mongolia
- Height: 176
- Weight: 62
- Spike: 282
- Block: 265
- Education: Ikh Zasag University

Volleyball information
- Position: Outside hitter
- Current club: (Mongolia) Enacoree
- Number: 10

National team

Bulgantamir Sergelenbaatar (Mongolia: Сэргэлэнбаатарын Булгантамир; Sergelenbaatariin Bulgantamir; born November 28, 1999) is a Mongolian female volleyball player. She is the Outside Hitter and Captain of the Mongolian club Enacoree Monty. She has won the Mongolian national league title (2019) and also became the MVP. Bulgantamir entered the Mongolia women's national volleyball team for the first time in 2016 Eastern Asian Championship.

== Career ==
=== 2019 ===
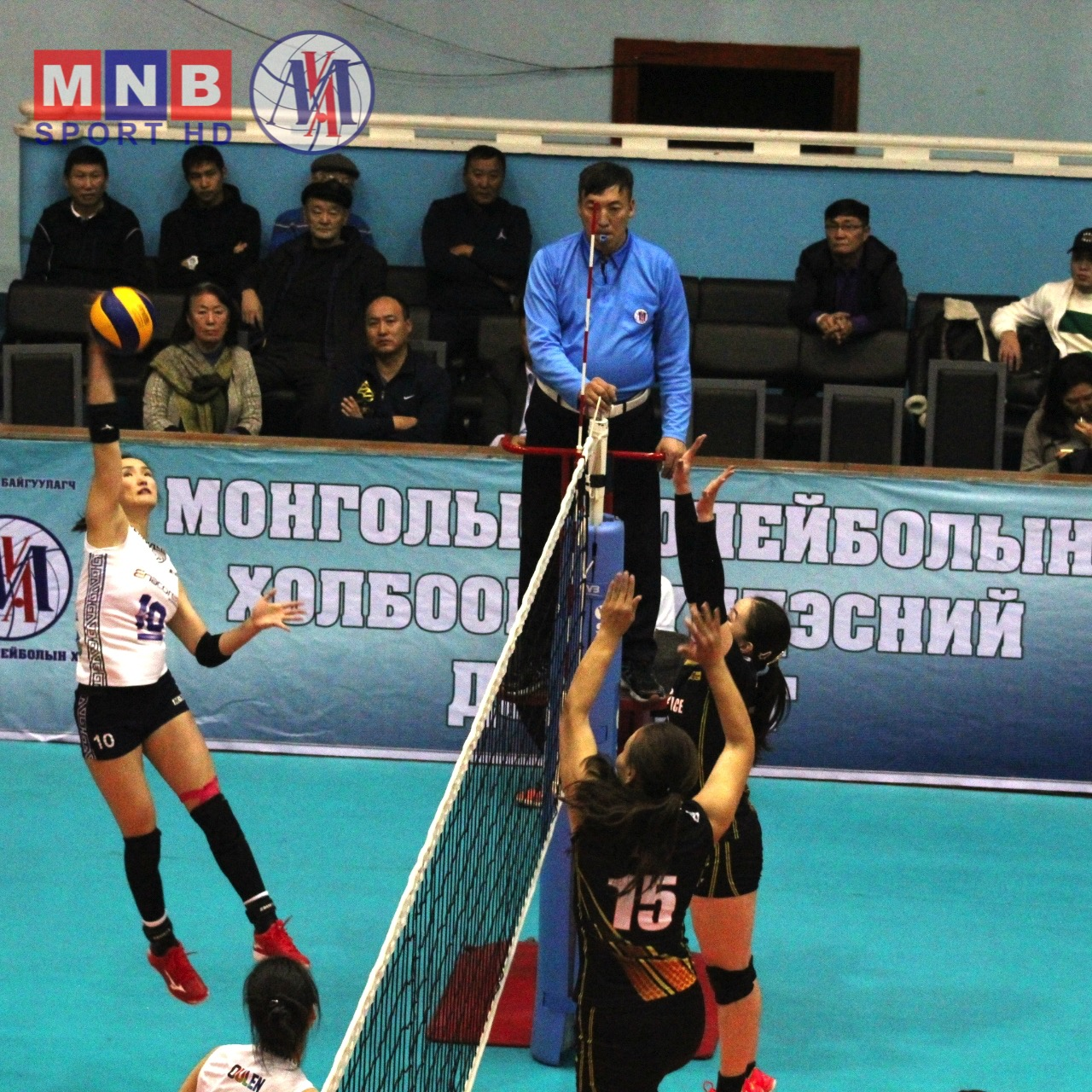
During the match of Enacoree against Hobby Ace in 2019 MVA National League

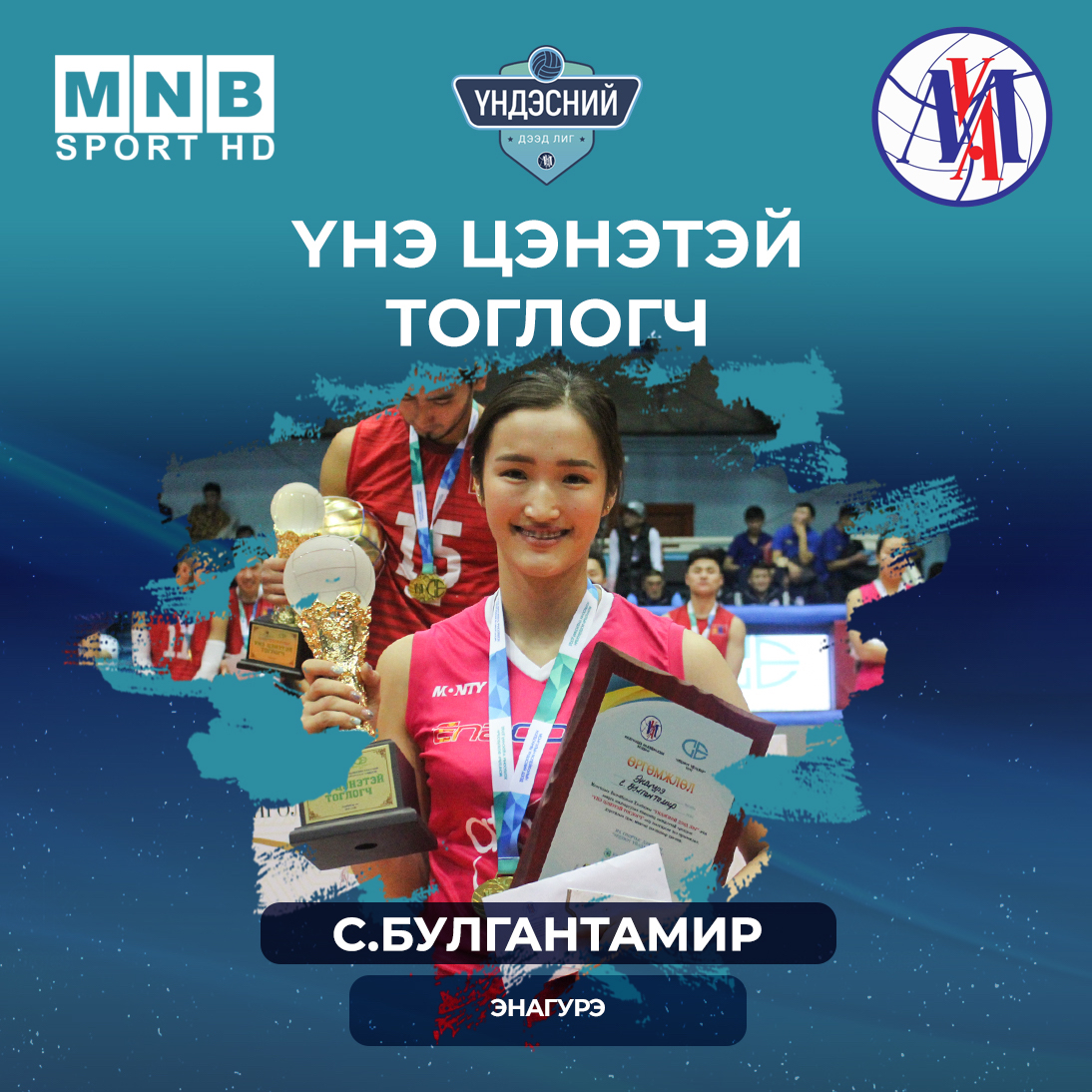
2019 MVA National League Closing ceremony

In 2019, the new Secretary General of the Mongolian Volleyball Association, Mr. Gotov Bayarsaikhan, and his management team organized the National League for the first time since 2011. The Enacoree's new generation girls participated National League-2019 and whose players' average age is 20.5. The team was led by Sergelenbaatar. It was her first national league. They finished the season 1st place the league table with 15 games (13 wins/2 loses) and qualified final series. Enacoree beat Hobby Ace 3 straight won (3:1, 3:0, 3:2) in the final. Sergelenbaatar named the player of the game award last 2 final matches.

Final matches statistics:

Game-1: She scored 13 points (Spikes-9, Aces-2, Block-1). Enacoree beat 3:1 (25:21, 20:25, 25:15, 25:17)

Game-2: She scored 22 points (Spikes-13, Aces-2, Block-1). And Player of the Game. Enacoree beat 3:0 (27:25, 25:23, 25:15)

Game-3: She scored 24 points (Spikes-18, Blocks-2, Aces-4). And Player of the Game. Enacoree beat 3:2 (12:25, 17:25, 25:18, 25:12, 15:12)

Sergelenbaatar scored 278 points in the league all 18 games (Spikes-220, Blocks-22, Aces-36). And became the National league champion for the first time. In the 2019 National League, Enacoree team won their third gold medal of the tournament and their first League Title since 2011. Sergelenbaatararded the Most Valuable Player.

=== 2020 ===
Enacoree proved to be the strongest team to be reckoned with in the Championships as they have already clinched the title four times in a row in 2017, 2018, 2019 and 2020. They won the Youth National Championship undefeated this year. At the 2020 Youth National Championship, Enacoree remained undefeated in the "B" group stage to reach the semifinals (Beat 2:0 Hobby Ace, Uurkhaichin, Dundgobi and MSUE), where they beat Erchim 3–0 to reach the final. In the final the team defeated Khilchin in straight sets to win the championship for the sixth time. Sergelenbaatar was awarded the MVP for two successive years.

== Personal life ==
Sergelenbaatar has been practicing athletics, freestyle wrestling, basketball, and handball when she was a child. She has been practicing volleyball since she was 13 years old with her first volleyball trainer Munkhtulga.M.

She likes to watch Lee Jae-yeong, the outside spiker of the South Korea women's national volleyball team and Incheon Heungkuk Life Pink Spiders. Their body measurements are quite similar, so she compares her play with her matches. Because Lee Jae-yeong is considered as one of the world's best players who takes an advantage of their shorter height in a volleyball play.

== Clubs ==
- (Mongolia) Enacoree (2015-)

== Awards ==
=== Club ===
- 2019 National League - Champion
- 2019 Tenuun-Ogoo Cup - Bronze medal
- 2019 Hobby Cup - Champion
- 2016 Hasu Cup - Champion
- 2015 MVA Cup - Champion
- 2016 MVA Cup - Champion
- 2017 MVA Cup - Silver medal
- 2015 Seniors National Championship - Gold medal
- 2019 Seniors National Championship - Silver medal, with Bulgan province team
- 2020 Seniors National Championship - Bronze medal, with Zavkhan province team
- 2016 Youth National Championship - Gold medal
- 2017 Youth National Championship - Gold medal
- 2018 Youth National Championship - Gold medal
- 2019 Youth National Championship - Gold medal
- 2020 Youth National Championship - Gold medal
- 2015 U18 National Championship - Gold medal
- 2016 U18 National Championship - Gold medal
- 2017 U18 National Championship - Gold medal
- 2016 "Super-8" U18 National Championship - Gold medal
- 2017 "Super-8" U18 National Championship - Gold medal
- 2015 Mongols children's sport game - Silver medal
- 2015 Mongolian children's sport game - Bronze medal

=== Individual awards ===
- 2020 Youth National Championship "Most valuable player"
- 2019 MVA National League "Most valuable player"
- 2019 Youth National Championship "Most valuable player"
- 2019 Hobby Cup "Best spiker"
- 2019 Tenuun-Ogoo Cup "Best server"
- 2019 Seniors National Championship "Most valuable player"
- 2018 Seniors National Championship "Best server"
- 2016 Youth National Championship "Best blocker"
- 2016 "Super-8" U18 National Championship "Best spiker"
- 2015 U18 National Championship "Most valuable player"
- 2016 U18 National Championship "Best blocker"
- 2017 U18 National Championship "Best spiker"
