= Manami Kojima =

Japanese volleyball player (born 1994)

Personal information
- Full name: Manami Kojima
- Nationality: Japanese
- Born: 7 November 1994 (age 31) Sendai City, Miyagi, Japan
- Education: Aoyama Gakuin University
- Height: 1.58 m (5 ft 2 in)
- Weight: 58 kg (128 lb)
- Spike: 269 cm (106 in)
- Block: 245 cm (96 in)

Volleyball information
- Position: Libero
- Current club: (United States) LOVB Salt Lake
- Number: 8 (national); 16 (club)

Career
- Years: Team
- 2010–2013 2013–2017 2017-2024 2024- 2024-: (Japan) Funabashi Municipal High School (Japan) Aoyama Gakuin University (Japan) NEC Red Rockets (United States) LOVB Salt Lake (United States) Athletes Unlimited

National team
- Years: Team
- 2013–: Japan
Honours
Women's volleyball
Representing Japan
Nations League
Silver medal – second place	2024 Bangkok	Team
AVC Continental Championship
Bronze medal – third place	2023 Nakhon Ratchasima	Team
Bronze medal – third place	2026 Tianjin	Team
FISU World University Games
Silver medal – second place	2017 Taipei	Team
Bronze medal – third place	2015 Gwangju	Team
VTV International Volleyball Cup
Gold medal – first place	2017 Hai Duong	Team
AVC Eastern Zonal Championship
Gold medal – first place	2014 Hong Kong	Team
Silver medal – second place	2016 Zhangjiagang	Team
U20 World Championship
Silver medal – second place	2013 Brno	Team

Manami Kojima (小島 満菜美, Kojima Manami; born 7 November 1994) is a Japanese professional volleyball player. She plays in the League One Volleyball for LOVB Salt Lake.

== Career ==
=== Early years ===
Kojima started playing volleyball in the third grade of elementary school. She said that she was invited by a friend. She then attended Funabashi Municipal High School. With the team, she excelled in the national tournament, such as the 2012 Inter-High School Championship. She was also selected as a member of the All-Japan High School Team.

In 2013, she attended Aoyama Gakuin University. She won the Libero Award and Rookie of the Year Award at the Kanto University Division 1 Spring League. She also selected as the member of Japan U20 National Team and participated in 2013 FIVB Volleyball Women's U20 World Championship held in Brno in June. She contributed to the team first runner-up in 28 years and also named as the Best Libero.

She also competed in AVC Eastern Zonal Championship in 2014 and 2016. She also selected for 2015 and 2017 FISU University Games. She performed very well in 2017 FISU held in Taipei where the team won silver medal for the first time in 11 tournaments.

=== Professional years ===
On December 26, 2016, NEC Red Rockets announced that Kojima would join the team.

She was selected for the Japan women's national volleyball team. She also selected to compete in 2022 VNL. She joined training camp for 2022 World Championship. However she wasn't selected as a member to compete in world championship.

In 2022–2023 season, she helped NEC to won their first victory in six season and she won Best Receiver award.

She was appointed as a captain of NEC in the 2023-24 V.League Division 1 Women's season. NEC won consecutive trophy and she was named as the Best Libero Award.

On March 11, 2024, NEC announced that she would leave the team at the end of the season and transferred to League One Volleyball in the US. In July, it was announced that she would be joining LOVB Salt Lake. In July, it was announced that she would be competing in the Athletes Unlimited tournament, which began in October. The tournament is a competition based on individual points. She placed 7th out of 44 players and 2nd as a Libero. She was voted as the Best Libero by the players.

In April 2025, she was awarded the Libero of the Year award at the LOVB's 2025 season.

== Awards ==
=== Individual ===
- 2013-14 Kanto University Spring League - Best Libero
- 2013 FIVB Volleyball Women's U20 World Championship - Best Libero
- 2013-14 Kanto University Autumn League - Best Libero
- 2015-16 Kanto University Spring League - Best Libero
- 2015-16 All Japan Intercollegiate Championship - Best Libero
- 2017 VTV International Women's Volleyball Cup - Best Libero
- 2017 FISU University Games - Best Libero
- 2017 FISU University Games - Best Digger
- 2019 VTV International Women's Volleyball Cup - Best Libero
- 2022-23 V.League Division 1 Women's - Best Receiver
- 2023 Asian Women's Volleyball Championship - Best Libero
- 2023-24 V.League Division 1 Women's - Best Libero
- 2024 FIVB Volleyball Women's Nations League - Best Libero
- 2024 Athletes Unlimited - Best Receiver
- 2024 Athletes Unlimited - Best Libero
- 2025 LOVB Pro season - Best Libero
- 2025 Athletes Unlimited - Best Receiver

=== College team ===
- 2013-14 All Japan Intercollegiate Championship - - Runner-up, with Aoyama Gakuin University
- 2013-14 Kanto University Spring League - - Champion, with Aoyama Gakuin University
- 2013-14 Kanto University Autumn League - - Champion, with Aoyama Gakuin University
- 2013-14 East Japan Intercollegiate Championship - - Runner-up, with Aoyama Gakuin University
- 2015-16 All Japan Intercollegiate Championship - - Bronze medal, with Aoyama Gakuin University
- 2015-16 Kanto University Spring League - - Bronze medal, with Aoyama Gakuin University
- 2016-17 Kanto University Autumn League - - Runner-up, with Aoyama Gakuin University

=== Club team ===
- 2016-17 Japanese Empress' Cup - - Bronze medal, with NEC Red Rockets
- 2016-17 V.League Division 1 - - Champion, with NEC Red Rockets
- 2018 Asian Women's Club Volleyball Championship - - Runner-up, with NEC Red Rockets
- 2017-18 Japanese Empress' Cup - - Bronze medal, with NEC Red Rockets
- 2019 VTV International Women's Volleyball Cup - - Champion, with NEC Red Rockets
- 2018-19 Japanese Empress' Cup - - Bronze medal, with NEC Red Rockets
- 2021-22 Kurowashiki Tournament - - Bronze medal, with NEC Red Rockets
- 2021-22 Japanese Empress' Cup - - Bronze medal, with NEC Red Rockets
- 2022-23 Kurowashiki Tournament - - Bronze medal, with NEC Red Rockets
- 2022-23 Japanese Empress' Cup - - Champion, with, with NEC Red Rockets
- 2022-23 V.League Division 1 Women's - - Champion, with NEC Red Rockets
- 2023-24 Japanese Empress' Cup - - Champion, with NEC Red Rockets
- 2023-24 V.League Division 1 Women's - - Champion, with NEC Red Rockets

=== National team ===
- (Czech Republic) 2013 FIVB Volleyball Women's U20 World Championship - - Runner-up
- (Hong Kong) 2014 Eastern Asian Women's Volleyball Championship - - Champion
- (South Korea) FISU World University Games - - Bronze medal
- (China) 2016 Eastern Asian Women's Volleyball Championship - - Runner-up
- (Taiwan) FISU World University Games - - Bronze medal
- (Vietnam) 2017 VTV International Women's Volleyball Cup - - Champion
- (Thailand) 2023 Asian Women's Volleyball Championship - - Bronze medal
- (Thailand) 2024 FIVB Volleyball Women's Nations League - - Runner-up
- (China) 2026 AVC Women's Volleyball Continental Championship - - Bronze Medal
