= 2024 Asian Eastern Zonal Women's Volleyball Championship =

2024 AVC Eastern Zonal Women's Volleyball Championship

Tournament details
- Host country: Hong Kong
- City: Hong Kong Island
- Dates: 13-18 August 2024
- Teams: 8
- Venue: 1 (in 1 host city)

Final positions
- Champions: China (4th title)

Tournament awards
- MVP: (China) Li Chenxuan

The 2024 Asian Eastern Zonal Women's Volleyball Championship was the 13th edition of the AVC Eastern Zonal Women's Volleyball Championship, the volleyball championship of East Asia. It was held in Hong Kong Island, Hong Kong from 13 to 18 August 2024.

== Pools composition ==
Pool A	Pool B
Macau	Hong Kong (Host)
China	South Korea
Chinese Taipei	North Korea
Japan	Mongolia

== Venue ==
- Queen Elizabeth Stadium, Hong Kong Island, Hong Kong

== Preliminary round ==
- All times are Hong Kong standard time(UTC+08:00).

=== Pool A ===
Pos	Team	Pld	W	L	Pts	SW	SL	SR	SPW	SPL	SPR	Qualification
1	Japan	3	3	0	8	9	2	4.500	259	185	1.400	Semifinals
2	China	3	2	1	7	8	3	2.667	255	206	1.238	Semifinals
3	Chinese Taipei	3	1	2	3	3	6	0.500	181	199	0.910	5th–8th semifinals
4	Macau	3	0	3	0	0	9	0.000	120	225	0.533	5th–8th semifinals

Date	Time		Score		Set 1	Set 2	Set 3	Set 4	Set 5	Total	Report
13 August	11:30	Macau	0–3	China	13–25	20–25	8–25			41–75	Result
13 August	14:00	Japan	3–0	Chinese Taipei	25–15	25–20	25–15			75–50	Result
14 August	11:30	Chinese Taipei	0–3	China	18–25	18–25	20–25			56–75	Result
14 August	14:00	Japan	3–0	Macau	25–10	25–12	25–8			75–30	Result
15 August	11:30	Macau	0–3	Chinese Taipei	15–25	20–25	14–25			49–75	Result
15 August	20:00	China	2–3	Japan	20–25	25–20	26–24	23–25	11–15	105–109	Result

=== Pool B ===
Pos	Team	Pld	W	L	Pts	SW	SL	SR	SPW	SPL	SPR	Qualification
1	North Korea	3	3	0	9	9	3	3.000	296	229	1.293	Semifinals
2	South Korea	3	2	1	5	7	5	1.400	268	257	1.043	Semifinals
3	Hong Kong	3	1	2	4	6	7	0.857	258	285	0.905	5th–8th semifinals
4	Mongolia	3	0	3	0	2	9	0.222	217	268	0.810	5th–8th semifinals

Date	Time		Score		Set 1	Set 2	Set 3	Set 4	Set 5	Total	Report
13 August	17:30	South Korea	1–3	North Korea	26–24	15–25	18–25	25–27		84–101	Result
13 August	20:00	Hong Kong	3–1	Mongolia	25–20	25–14	21–25	25–19		96–78	Result
14 August	17:30	North Korea	3–1	Mongolia	22–25	25–19	25–19	25–13		97–76	Result
14 August	20:00	South Korea	3–2	Hong Kong	25–19	21–25	25–18	23–25	15–6	109–93	Result
15 August	14:00	Mongolia	0–3	South Korea	21–25	21–25	21–25			63–75	Result
15 August	17:30	Hong Kong	1–3	North Korea	14–25	16–25	25–23	14–25		69–98	Result

== Final round ==
- All times are Hong Kong standard time(UTC+08:00).

=== 5th–8th places ===
5th–8th semifinals
17 August
Chinese Taipei	3
Mongolia	0
17 August
Hong Kong	3
Macau	0

5th place match
18 August
Chinese Taipei	3
Hong Kong	0
7th place match
18 August
Mongolia	3
Macau	1

==== 5th–8th semifinals ====
Date	Time		Score		Set 1	Set 2	Set 3	Set 4	Set 5	Total	Report
17 August	11:30	Chinese Taipei	3–0	Mongolia	25–17	25–15	25–15			75–47	Result

Date	Time		Score		Set 1	Set 2	Set 3	Set 4	Set 5	Total	Report
17 August	14:00	Hong Kong	3–0	Macau	25–18	25–19	25–16			75–53	Result

==== 7th place match ====
Date	Time		Score		Set 1	Set 2	Set 3	Set 4	Set 5	Total	Report
18 August	10:30	Mongolia	3–1	Macau	24–26	25–19	25–13	25–17		99–75	Result

==== 5th place match ====
Date	Time		Score		Set 1	Set 2	Set 3	Set 4	Set 5	Total	Report
18 August	13:00	Chinese Taipei	3–0	Hong Kong	25–17	25–15	25–23			75–55	Result

=== Final four ===
Semifinals
17 August
North Korea	2
China	3
17 August
Japan	3
South Korea	0

Final
18 August
China	3
Japan	0
3rd place match
18 August
North Korea	3
South Korea	1

==== Semifinals ====
Date	Time		Score		Set 1	Set 2	Set 3	Set 4	Set 5	Total	Report
17 August	17:30	North Korea	2–3	China	22–25	25–19	12–25	25–22	16–18	100–109	Result

Date	Time		Score		Set 1	Set 2	Set 3	Set 4	Set 5	Total	Report
17 August	20:00	Japan	3–0	South Korea	25–20	25–16	25–19			75–55	Result

==== 3rd place match ====
Date	Time		Score		Set 1	Set 2	Set 3	Set 4	Set 5	Total	Report
18 August	16:30	North Korea	3–1	South Korea	20–25	25–22	25–20	25–23		95–90	Result

==== Final ====
Date	Time		Score		Set 1	Set 2	Set 3	Set 4	Set 5	Total	Report
18 August	19:00	China	3–0	Japan	25–19	25–22	25–19			75–60	Result

== Final standing ==
Rank	Team
1st place, gold medalist(s)	China
2nd place, silver medalist(s)	Japan
3rd place, bronze medalist(s)	North Korea
4	South Korea
5	Chinese Taipei
6	Hong Kong
7	Mongolia
8	Macau

2024 AVC Eastern Women's champions

China
4th title

== Awards ==
- MVP: (China) Li Chenxuan
- Best Coach: (China) Kuang Qi
