= Volleyball at the 2023 East Asian Youth Games =

Tournament details
- Host country: Mongolia
- City: Ulaanbaatar
- Dates: 18–22 August
- Teams: 5(men); 3(women)
- Venue(s): Buyant Ukhaa Sports Palace

Volleyball was held at the 2023 East Asian Youth Games during August 19 to 23, 2023, at the Buyant Ukhaa Sports Palace in Ulaanbaatar, Mongolia. Only athletes born on 2006.01.01 – 2007.12.31 were allowed to participate.

== Medal table ==
* Host nation (Mongolia)

Rank	Nation	Gold	Silver	Bronze	Total
1	China (CHN)	2	0	0	2
2	Mongolia (MGL)	0	1	1	2
3	Chinese Taipei (TPE)	0	1	0	1
4	Hong Kong (HKG)	0	0	1	1
Totals (4 entries)		2	2	2	6

== Medal summary ==
Event	Gold	Silver	Bronze
Men	China	Chinese Taipei	Mongolia
Women	China	Mongolia	Hong Kong

== Men`s event ==
Pos	Team	Pld	W	L	Pts	SW	SL	SR	SPW	SPL	SPR	Qualification
1	China	4	4	0	12	12	0	MAX	0	0	—	Gold Medal
2	Chinese Taipei	4	3	1	9	9	3	3.000	0	0	—	Silver Medal
3	Mongolia	4	1	3	3	4	9	0.444	0	0	—	Bronze Medal
4	Hong Kong	4	1	3	3	4	10	0.400	0	0	—	
5	Macau	4	1	3	3	3	10	0.300	0	0	—	

Source: ]

Date	Time		Score		Set 1	Set 2	Set 3	Set 4	Set 5	Total	Report
18 August	15:00	Hong Kong	0–3	Chinese Taipei							
18 August	17:00	China	3–0	Macau							
19 August	17:00	Chinese Taipei	0–3	China							
19 August	20:00	Mongolia	1–3	Hong Kong							
20 August	17:00	China	3–0	Mongolia							
20 August	20:00	Macau	0–3	Chinese Taipei							
21 August	15:00	Mongolia	3–0	Macau							
21 August	17:00	Hong Kong	0–3	China							
22 August	15:00	Macau	3–1	Hong Kong							
22 August	17:00	Chinese Taipei	3–0	Mongolia							

== Women`s event ==
Pos	Team	Pld	W	L	Pts	SW	SL	SR	SPW	SPL	SPR	Qualification
1	China	2	2	0	6	6	0	MAX	0	0	—	Gold Medal
2	Mongolia	2	1	1	3	3	3	1.000	0	0	—	Silver Medal
3	Hong Kong	2	0	2	0	0	6	0.000	0	0	—	Bronze Medal

Source: ]

Date	Time		Score		Set 1	Set 2	Set 3	Set 4	Set 5	Total	Report
19 August	15:00	Mongolia	3–0	Hong Kong							
20 August	15:00	Hong Kong	0–3	China							
21 August	20:00	Mongolia	0–3	China							
