= Volleyball at the 2017 Summer Universiade =

Volleyball at the XXIX Summer Universiade
- Venue: various
- Dates: 20–29 August
- Teams: 22 (men); 16 (women)

Volleyball was contested at the 2017 Summer Universiade from 20 to 29 August in Taipei, lTaiwan.

== Medal summary ==
=== Medal table ===
Rank	Nation	Gold	Silver	Bronze	Total
1	Russia (RUS)	1	1	0	2
2	Iran (IRI)	1	0	0	1
3	Japan (JPN)	0	1	1	2
4	Ukraine (UKR)	0	0	1	1
Totals (4 entries)		2	2	2	6

=== Medal events ===
Event	Gold	Silver	Bronze
Men	Iran (IRI); Akbar Valaei; Mohammad Fallah; Amirali Mohammadfathali; Ghasem Karkhaneh; Mohammad Reza Moazzen; Saeid Shiroodghorbani; Armin Ranjbar; Behzad Heidari Shahi; Ali Yousefpoor; Farhad Piroutpour; Mohammad Taher Vadi; Hadi Barshan	Russia (RUS); Evgenii Bannov; Azizbek Ismailov; Vadim Likhosherstov; Bogdan Glivenko; Dmitrii Emelianov; Leonid Shchadilov; Anton Botin; Vladimir Shishkin; Dmitry Shcherbinin; Alexey Pluzhnikov; Alexander Boldyrev; Sergey Nikitin	Japan (JPN); Naoya Takano; Takahiko Imamura; Kenya Fujinaka; Taichi Fukuyama; Shohei Yamaguchi; Yasunari Kodama; Tomohiro Yamamoto; Tsubasa Hisahara; Kosuke Hata; Keisuke Sakai; Yutaka Ogihara; Yuma Watanabe
Women	Russia (RUS); Angelina Lazarenko; Natalia Krotkova; Anna Kotikova; Alina Pankova; Kristina Kurnosova; Ekaterina Lyubushkina; Tatiana Iurinskaia; Svetlana Serbina; Viktoriia Russu; Daria Ryseva; Elizaveta Kotova; Natalia Malykh	Japan (JPN); Momoka Oda; Yūka Imamura; Nao Muranaga; Mika Shibata; Shiori Tsukada; Manami Kojima; Misaki Yamauchi; Arisa Inoue; Ayaka Sugi; Haruka Maruo; Kasumi Nojima; Mami Yokota	Ukraine (UKR); Kateryna Dudnyk; Maryna Dehtiarova; Daria Drozd; Diana Karpets; Kateryna Silchenkova; Krystyna Niemtseva; Tetiana Yatskiv; Anastasiia Chernukha; Yuliya Boyko; Hanna Kyrychenko; Anna Yefremenko; Olena Napalkova

== Men ==
22 teams participated in the men's tournament.

=== Teams ===
Pool A

- Chinese Taipei
- Brazil
- United States
- France
- Japan

Pool B

- South Korea
- Ukraine
- Latvia
- Mexico
- Portugal

Pool C

- Russia
- Czech Republic
- Australia
- Hong Kong
- Romania
- Chile

Pool D

- Argentina
- China
- Switzerland
- Canada
- United Arab Emirates
- Cyprus

== Women ==
16 teams participated in the women's tournament.

=== Teams ===
Pool A

- Chinese Taipei
- Colombia
- Czech Republic
- France

Pool B

- Ukraine
- Canada
- Switzerland
- Argentina

Pool C

- Japan
- Thailand
- United States
- Latvia

Pool D

- Russia
- Brazil
- Finland
- Mexico
