= 2025 Asian Eastern Zonal Women's Volleyball Championship =

Volleyball competition held in Hong Kong

Tournament details
- Host country: Hong Kong
- City: Hong Kong Island
- Dates: 26–31 August 2025
- Teams: 6
- Venue: 1 (in 1 host city)

Final positions
- Champions: China (5th title)

Tournament awards
- MVP: (China) Li Chenxuan

The 2025 Asian Eastern Zonal Women's Volleyball Championship was the 14th edition of the Asian Eastern Zonal Women's Volleyball Championship, the volleyball championship of East Asia. It was held at Queen Elizabeth Stadium in Hong Kong Island, Hong Kong from 26 to 31 August 2025.

== Pools composition ==
Pool A	Pool B
Hong Kong (Host)	China
Chinese Taipei	South Korea
Mongolia	Macau

== Venue ==
All matches
Hong Kong Island, Hong Kong
Queen Elizabeth Stadium
Capacity: 3,500

== Preliminary round ==
- All times are Hong Kong Standard Time (UTC+08:00).

=== Pool A ===
Pos	Team	Pld	W	L	Pts	SW	SL	SR	SPW	SPL	SPR	Qualification
1	Chinese Taipei	2	2	0	6	6	0	MAX	150	109	1.376	Semifinals
2	Hong Kong (H)	2	1	1	2	3	5	0.600	163	185	0.881	Semifinals
3	Mongolia	2	0	2	1	2	6	0.333	170	189	0.899	5th place match

Source: FIVB Live Center
(H) Host

Date	Time		Score		Set 1	Set 2	Set 3	Set 4	Set 5	Total	Report
26 Aug	20:00	Chinese Taipei	3-0	Mongolia	25–16	25–22	25–22			75–60	Report
27 Aug	17:30	Mongolia	2-3	Hong Kong	25–23	25–23	26–28	23–25	11–15	110–114	Report
28 Aug	20:00	Hong Kong	0-3	Chinese Taipei	17–25	18–25	14–25			49–75	Report

=== Pool B ===
Pos	Team	Pld	W	L	Pts	SW	SL	SR	SPW	SPL	SPR	Qualification
1	China	2	2	0	6	6	0	MAX	150	76	1.974	Semifinals
2	South Korea	2	1	1	3	3	3	1.000	119	103	1.155	Semifinals
3	Macau	2	0	2	0	0	6	0.000	60	150	0.400	5th place match

Source: FIVB Live Center

Date	Time		Score		Set 1	Set 2	Set 3	Set 4	Set 5	Total	Report
26 August	17:30	South Korea	3-0	Macau	25–12	25–10	25–6			75–28	Report
27 August	20:00	China	3-0	South Korea	25–15	25–16	25–13			75–44	Report
28 August	17:30	Macau	0-3	China	25–12	25–13	25–7			75–32	Report

== Final round ==
- All times are Hong Kong Standard Time (UTC+08:00).

=== 5th place match ===
Date	Time		Score		Set 1	Set 2	Set 3	Set 4	Set 5	Total	Report
30 August	14:30	Mongolia	3-0	Macau	25–11	25–12	25–18			75–41	Report

=== Final four ===
Semifinals
30 August
Chinese Taipei	3
South Korea	0
30 August
China	3
Hong Kong	0

Final
31 August
Chinese Taipei	1
China	3
3rd place match
31 August
South Korea	3
Hong Kong	0

==== Semifinals ====
Date	Time		Score		Set 1	Set 2	Set 3	Set 4	Set 5	Total	Report
30 August	17:30	Chinese Taipei	3-0	South Korea	25–15	25–21	25–13			75–49	Report
30 August	20:00	China	3–0	Hong Kong	25–15	25–16	25–7			75–38	Report

==== 3rd place match ====
Date	Time		Score		Set 1	Set 2	Set 3	Set 4	Set 5	Total	Report
31 August	14:30	South Korea	3-0	Hong Kong	25–15	25–22	25–14			75–51	Report

==== Final ====
Date	Time		Score		Set 1	Set 2	Set 3	Set 4	Set 5	Total	Report
31 August	17:30	Chinese Taipei	1-3	China	26–24	24–26	22–25	19–25		91–100	Report

== Final standing ==
Rank	Team
1st place, gold medalist(s)	China
2nd place, silver medalist(s)	Chinese Taipei
3rd place, bronze medalist(s)	South Korea
4	Hong Kong
5	Mongolia
6	Macau

2025 Asia Eastern Zonal Women's champions

China
Fifth title

== Awards ==
- MVP: (China) Li Chenxuan
- Best Coach: (China) Xie Jiyang
