= 2013 Asian Women's Volleyball Championship =

International indoor volleyball tournament

Tournament details
- Host country: Thailand
- City: Nakhon Ratchasima
- Dates: 13–21 September
- Teams: 16 (from 1 confederation)
- Venues: 2 (in 1 host city)

Final positions
- Champions: Thailand (2nd title)
- Runners-up: Japan
- Third place: South Korea
- Fourth place: China

Tournament awards
- MVP: (Thailand) Wilavan Apinyapong

The 2013 Asian Women's Volleyball Championship was the seventeenth edition of the Asian Championship, a biennial international volleyball tournament organised by the Asian Volleyball Confederation (AVC) with Thailand Volleyball Association (TVA). The tournament was held in Nakhon Ratchasima, Thailand from 13 to 21 September 2013.

== Venues ==
- Korat Chatchai Hall and MCC Hall, The Mall Nakhon Ratchasima, Nakhon Ratchasima, Thailand

== Pools composition ==
The teams were seeded based on their final ranking at the 2011 Asian Women's Volleyball Championship.

Pool A	Pool B	Pool C	Pool D
Thailand (Host & 4th); Kazakhstan (9th); Australia; Mongolia	China (1st); Iran (8th); Philippines; India	Japan (2nd); Vietnam (7th); Indonesia; Hong Kong	South Korea (3rd); Chinese Taipei (5th); Myanmar; Sri Lanka

== Preliminary round ==
=== Pool A ===
Pos	Team	Pld	W	L	Pts	SW	SL	SR	SPW	SPL	SPR	Qualification
1	Kazakhstan	3	3	0	9	9	2	4.500	268	215	1.247	Pool E
2	Thailand	3	2	1	6	7	3	2.333	243	167	1.455	Pool E
3	Australia	3	1	2	3	4	6	0.667	197	235	0.838	Pool G
4	Mongolia	3	0	3	0	0	9	0.000	134	225	0.596	Pool G

Date	Time		Score		Set 1	Set 2	Set 3	Set 4	Set 5	Total	Report
13 Sep	11:00	Australia	3–0	Mongolia	25–20	25–23	25–18			75–61	Report
13 Sep	14:00	Thailand	1–3	Kazakhstan	24–26	24–26	25–17	20–25		93–94	Report
14 Sep	11:00	Kazakhstan	3–0	Mongolia	25–22	25–16	25–9			75–47	Report
14 Sep	14:00	Thailand	3–0	Australia	25–16	25–17	25–14			75–47	Report
15 Sep	14:00	Australia	1–3	Kazakhstan	16–25	15–25	26–24	18–25		75–99	Report
15 Sep	16:00	Mongolia	0–3	Thailand	12–25	9–25	5–25			26–75	Report

=== Pool B ===
Pos	Team	Pld	W	L	Pts	SW	SL	SR	SPW	SPL	SPR	Qualification
1	China	3	3	0	9	9	0	MAX	225	109	2.064	Pool F
2	Iran	3	2	1	6	6	5	1.200	235	218	1.078	Pool F
3	India	3	1	2	3	4	6	0.667	179	230	0.778	Pool H
4	Philippines	3	0	3	0	1	9	0.111	163	245	0.665	Pool H

Date	Time		Score		Set 1	Set 2	Set 3	Set 4	Set 5	Total	Report
13 Sep	11:00	Philippines	0–3	India	22–25	24–26	12–25			58–76	Report
13 Sep	19:00	Iran	0–3	China	11–25	16–25	17–25			44–75	Report
14 Sep	16:00	Iran	3–1	Philippines	19–25	25–20	25–18	25–15		94–78	Report
14 Sep	19:00	China	3–0	India	25–12	25–15	25–11			75–38	Report
15 Sep	16:00	India	1–3	Iran	13–25	25–22	9–25	18–25		65–97	Report
15 Sep	18:00	Philippines	0–3	China	9–25	10–25	8–25			27–75	Report

=== Pool C ===
Pos	Team	Pld	W	L	Pts	SW	SL	SR	SPW	SPL	SPR	Qualification
1	Japan	3	3	0	9	9	0	MAX	225	89	2.528	Pool E
2	Vietnam	3	2	1	6	6	4	1.500	206	197	1.046	Pool E
3	Indonesia	3	1	2	3	4	6	0.667	172	236	0.729	Pool G
4	Hong Kong	3	0	3	0	0	9	0.000	144	225	0.640	Pool G

Date	Time		Score		Set 1	Set 2	Set 3	Set 4	Set 5	Total	Report
13 Sep	16:30	Japan	3–0	Vietnam	25–6	25–13	25–16			75–35	Report
13 Sep	18:00	Indonesia	3–0	Hong Kong	25–21	25–21	25–23			75–65	Report
14 Sep	16:30	Indonesia	0–3	Japan	6–25	11–25	9–25			26–75	Report
14 Sep	18:00	Hong Kong	0–3	Vietnam	16–25	18–25	17–25			51–75	Report
15 Sep	13:30	Japan	3–0	Hong Kong	25–10	25–7	25–11			75–28	Report
15 Sep	18:00	Vietnam	3–1	Indonesia	25–19	21–25	25–10	25–17		96–71	Report

=== Pool D ===
Pos	Team	Pld	W	L	Pts	SW	SL	SR	SPW	SPL	SPR	Qualification
1	South Korea	3	3	0	9	9	0	MAX	225	93	2.419	Pool F
2	Chinese Taipei	3	2	1	6	6	3	2.000	192	137	1.401	Pool F
3	Sri Lanka	3	1	2	3	3	6	0.500	122	211	0.578	Pool H
4	Myanmar	3	0	3	0	0	9	0.000	128	226	0.566	Pool H

Date	Time		Score		Set 1	Set 2	Set 3	Set 4	Set 5	Total	Report
13 Sep	14:00	South Korea	3–0	Myanmar	25–7	25–11	25–12			75–30	Report
13 Sep	16:00	Sri Lanka	0–3	Chinese Taipei	6–25	6–25	13–25			25–75	Report
14 Sep	11:00	Myanmar	0–3	Chinese Taipei	10–25	10–25	17–25			37–75	Report
14 Sep	14:00	South Korea	3–0	Sri Lanka	25–8	25–6	25–7			75–21	Report
15 Sep	11:00	Sri Lanka	3–0	Myanmar	26–24	25–17	25–20			76–61	Report
15 Sep	11:00	Chinese Taipei	0–3	South Korea	14–25	15–25	13–25			42–75	Report

== Classification round ==
- The results and the points of the matches between the same teams that were already played during the preliminary round shall be taken into account for the classification round.

=== Pool E ===
Pos	Team	Pld	W	L	Pts	SW	SL	SR	SPW	SPL	SPR	Qualification
1	Japan	3	2	1	6	7	4	1.750	265	206	1.286	Quarterfinals
2	Thailand	3	2	1	6	7	4	1.750	271	226	1.199	Quarterfinals
3	Kazakhstan	3	2	1	6	7	4	1.750	237	258	0.919	Quarterfinals
4	Vietnam	3	0	3	0	0	9	0.000	142	225	0.631	Quarterfinals

Date	Time		Score		Set 1	Set 2	Set 3	Set 4	Set 5	Total	Report
16 Sep	14:00	Japan	1–3	Thailand	15–25	23–25	25–23	28–30		91–103	Report
16 Sep	19:00	Kazakhstan	3–0	Vietnam	25–21	25–23	25–22			75–66	Report
17 Sep	14:00	Thailand	3–0	Vietnam	25–11	25–15	25–15			75–41	Report
17 Sep	16:30	Kazakhstan	1–3	Japan	15–25	15–25	26–24	12–25		68–99	Report

=== Pool F ===
Pos	Team	Pld	W	L	Pts	SW	SL	SR	SPW	SPL	SPR	Qualification
1	China	3	3	0	9	9	0	MAX	225	133	1.692	Quarterfinals
2	South Korea	3	2	1	6	6	3	2.000	203	159	1.277	Quarterfinals
3	Chinese Taipei	3	1	2	3	3	6	0.500	153	197	0.777	Quarterfinals
4	Iran	3	0	3	0	0	9	0.000	133	225	0.591	Quarterfinals

Date	Time		Score		Set 1	Set 2	Set 3	Set 4	Set 5	Total	Report
16 Sep	11:00	South Korea	3–0	Iran	25–14	25–10	25–18			75–42	Report
16 Sep	16:30	China	3–0	Chinese Taipei	25–11	25–14	25–11			75–36	Report
17 Sep	11:00	Iran	0–3	Chinese Taipei	18–25	15–25	14–25			47–75	Report
17 Sep	19:00	China	3–0	South Korea	25–22	25–14	25–17			75–53	Report

=== Pool G ===
Pos	Team	Pld	W	L	Pts	SW	SL	SR	SPW	SPL	SPR	Qualification
1	Australia	3	3	0	8	9	3	3.000	289	236	1.225	9th–12th places
2	Indonesia	3	2	1	6	7	4	1.750	253	252	1.004	9th–12th places
3	Mongolia	3	1	2	3	4	7	0.571	243	248	0.980	13th–16th places
4	Hong Kong	3	0	3	1	3	9	0.333	235	284	0.827	13th–16th places

Date	Time		Score		Set 1	Set 2	Set 3	Set 4	Set 5	Total	Report
16 Sep	11:00	Australia	3–2	Hong Kong	22–25	25–9	24–26	25–21	15–9	111–90	Report
16 Sep	14:00	Indonesia	3–1	Mongolia	25–18	18–25	25–18	25–23		93–84	Report
17 Sep	11:00	Mongolia	3–1	Hong Kong	25–16	23–25	25–22	25–17		98–80	Report
17 Sep	14:00	Australia	3–1	Indonesia	23–25	30–28	25–14	25–18		103–85	Report

=== Pool H ===
Pos	Team	Pld	W	L	Pts	SW	SL	SR	SPW	SPL	SPR	Qualification
1	India	3	2	1	7	8	3	2.667	258	211	1.223	9th–12th places
2	Philippines	3	2	1	5	6	5	1.200	236	236	1.000	9th–12th places
3	Sri Lanka	3	1	2	4	5	6	0.833	225	239	0.941	13th–16th places
4	Myanmar	3	1	2	2	3	8	0.375	225	258	0.872	13th–16th places

Date	Time		Score		Set 1	Set 2	Set 3	Set 4	Set 5	Total	Report
16 Sep	16:00	India	2–3	Myanmar	23–25	25–22	22–25	25–19	12–15	107–106	Report
16 Sep	18:00	Sri Lanka	2–3	Philippines	25–19	18–25	25–19	23–25	11–15	102–103	Report
17 Sep	16:00	Philippines	3–0	Myanmar	25–18	25–22	25–18			75–58	Report
17 Sep	18:00	India	3–0	Sri Lanka	25–13	25–15	25–19			75–47	Report

== Classification 13th–16th ==
13th–16th places
19 September – Nakhon Ratchasima
Mongolia	3
Myanmar	0
19 September – Nakhon Ratchasima
Sri Lanka	0
Hong Kong	3

13th place
20 September – Nakhon Ratchasima
Mongolia	1
Hong Kong	3
15th place
20 September – Nakhon Ratchasima
Myanmar	1
Sri Lanka	3

=== Semifinals ===
Date	Time		Score		Set 1	Set 2	Set 3	Set 4	Set 5	Total	Report
19 Sep	11:00	Mongolia	3–0	Myanmar	25–15	25–19	25–18			75–52	Report
19 Sep	14:00	Sri Lanka	0–3	Hong Kong	18–25	17–25	18–25			53–75	Report

=== 15th place ===
Date	Time		Score		Set 1	Set 2	Set 3	Set 4	Set 5	Total	Report
20 Sep	11:00	Myanmar	1–3	Sri Lanka	26–24	24–26	23–25	16–25		89–100	Report

=== 13th place ===
Date	Time		Score		Set 1	Set 2	Set 3	Set 4	Set 5	Total	Report
20 Sep	14:00	Mongolia	1–3	Hong Kong	20–25	25–20	23–25	18–25		86–95	Report

== Classification 9th–12th ==
9th–12th places
19 September – Nakhon Ratchasima
Australia	3
Philippines	0
19 September – Nakhon Ratchasima
India	1
Indonesia	3

9th place
20 September – Nakhon Ratchasima
Australia	3
Indonesia	0
11th place
20 September – Nakhon Ratchasima
Philippines	0
India	3

=== Semifinals ===
Date	Time		Score		Set 1	Set 2	Set 3	Set 4	Set 5	Total	Report
19 Sep	16:00	Australia	3–0	Philippines	25–22	25–15	25–23			75–60	Report
19 Sep	18:00	India	1–3	Indonesia	30–32	25–23	17–25	21–25		93–105	Report

=== 11th place ===
Date	Time		Score		Set 1	Set 2	Set 3	Set 4	Set 5	Total	Report
20 Sep	16:00	Philippines	0–3	India	19–25	22–25	16–25			57–75	Report

=== 9th place ===
Date	Time		Score		Set 1	Set 2	Set 3	Set 4	Set 5	Total	Report
20 Sep	18:00	Australia	3–0	Indonesia	25–22	25–17	25–23			75–62	Report

== Final round ==
Quarterfinals
19 September – Nakhon Ratchasima
Thailand	3
Chinese Taipei	0
19 September – Nakhon Ratchasima
China	3
Vietnam	0
19 September – Nakhon Ratchasima
South Korea	3
Kazakhstan	0
19 September – Nakhon Ratchasima
Japan	3
Iran	0

Semifinals
20 September – Nakhon Ratchasima
Thailand	3
China	2
20 September – Nakhon Ratchasima
South Korea	1
Japan	3

Final
21 September – Nakhon Ratchasima
Thailand	3
Japan	0
3rd place
21 September – Nakhon Ratchasima
China	2
South Korea	3

5th–8th places
20 September – Nakhon Ratchasima
Kazakhstan	3
Iran	1
20 September – Nakhon Ratchasima
Chinese Taipei	2
Vietnam	3

5th place
21 September – Nakhon Ratchasima
Kazakhstan	3
Vietnam	2
7th place
21 September – Nakhon Ratchasima
Iran	0
Chinese Taipei	3

=== Quarterfinals ===
Date	Time		Score		Set 1	Set 2	Set 3	Set 4	Set 5	Total	Report
19 Sep	11:00	Japan	3–0	Iran	25–16	25–13	25–11			75–40	Report
19 Sep	14:00	Thailand	3–0	Chinese Taipei	25–13	25–14	25–23			75–50	Report
19 Sep	16:30	South Korea	3–0	Kazakhstan	25–12	25–23	25–20			75–55	Report
19 Sep	19:00	China	3–0	Vietnam	25–15	25–20	25–13			75–48	Report

=== 5th–8th semifinals ===
Date	Time		Score		Set 1	Set 2	Set 3	Set 4	Set 5	Total	Report
20 Sep	11:00	Kazakhstan	3–1	Iran	25–16	25–22	21–25	25–20		96–83	Report
20 Sep	13:00	Chinese Taipei	2–3	Vietnam	25–19	25–22	16–25	18–25	13–15	97–106	Report

=== Semifinals ===
Date	Time		Score		Set 1	Set 2	Set 3	Set 4	Set 5	Total	Report
20 Sep	16:00	Thailand	3–2	China	19–25	25–19	25–22	21–25	16–14	106–105	Report
20 Sep	18:30	South Korea	1–3	Japan	22–25	25–19	19–25	20–25		86–94	Report

=== 7th place ===
Date	Time		Score		Set 1	Set 2	Set 3	Set 4	Set 5	Total	Report
21 Sep	10:30	Iran	0–3	Chinese Taipei	9–25	16–25	17–25			42–75	

=== 5th place ===
Date	Time		Score		Set 1	Set 2	Set 3	Set 4	Set 5	Total	Report
21 Sep	13:00	Vietnam	2–3	Kazakhstan	25–18	25–18	28–30	21–25	6–15	105–106	

=== 3rd place ===
Date	Time		Score		Set 1	Set 2	Set 3	Set 4	Set 5	Total	Report
21 Sep	15:30	China	2–3	South Korea	25–13	25–17	21–25	23–25	11–15	105–95	

=== Final ===
Date	Time		Score		Set 1	Set 2	Set 3	Set 4	Set 5	Total	Report
21 Sep	19:50	Thailand	3–0	Japan	25–22	25–18	25–17			75–57	

== Final standing ==
Rank	Team
1st place, gold medalist(s)	Thailand
2nd place, silver medalist(s)	Japan
3rd place, bronze medalist(s)	South Korea
4	China
5	Kazakhstan
6	Vietnam
7	Chinese Taipei
8	Iran
9	Australia
10	Indonesia
11	India
12	Philippines
13	Hong Kong
14	Mongolia
15	Sri Lanka
16	Myanmar

Qualified for the 2013 World Grand Champions Cup

2013 Asian Women's champions

Thailand
2nd title

Team Roster

Wanna Buakaew, Piyanut Pannoy, Thatdao Nuekjang, Pleumjit Thinkaow, Onuma Sittirak, Wilavan Apinyapong, Amporn Hyapha, Tapaphaipun Chaisri, Nootsara Tomkom, Malika Kanthong, Pornpun Guedpard, Ajcharaporn Kongyot

Head coach

Kiattipong Radchatagriengkai

== Awards ==
- MVP: (Thailand) Wilavan Apinyapong
- Best scorer: (South Korea) Kim Yeon-koung
- Best spiker: (China) Zhu Ting
- Best blocker: (China) Xu Yunli
- Best server: (South Korea) Kim Yeon-koung
- Best setter: (Thailand) Nootsara Tomkom
- Best libero: (South Korea) Kim Hae-ran
