= 2018 Eastern Asian Women's Volleyball Championship =

2018 AVC Eastern Zonal Women's Volleyball Championship
Tournament details
- Host country: China
- City: Zhangjiagang
- Dates: 10–15 July 2018
- Teams: 8
- Venue: 1 (in 1 host city)

Final positions
- Champions: Japan (5th title)

Tournament awards
- MVP: (Japan) Chinami Furuya

The 2018 Asian Eastern Zonal Women's Volleyball Championship was the 11th edition of the AVC Eastern Zonal Women's Volleyball Championship, the volleyball championship of East Asia. It was held in Zhangjiagang, China from 10 to 15 July 2016.

Japan won the title for the fifth time, defeating China in the final, 3–0. Chinami Furuya was elected the most valuable player.

== Pools composition ==
Pool A	Pool B
China (Host)	Chinese Taipei
South Korea	Japan
Hong Kong	North Korea
Mongolia	Macau

== Venue ==
- Zhangjiagang Sports Center, Zhangjiagang, China

== Preliminary round ==
- All times are China standard time (UTC+08:00).

=== Pool A ===
Pos	Team	Pld	W	L	Pts	SW	SL	SR	SPW	SPL	SPR	Qualification
1	China	3	3	0	9	9	0	MAX	299	181	1.652	Semifinals
2	South Korea	3	2	1	6	6	3	2.000	217	193	1.124	Semifinals
3	Hong Kong	3	1	2	3	3	6	0.500	202	214	0.944	5th–8th semifinals
4	Mongolia	3	0	3	0	0	9	0.000	162	225	0.720	5th–8th semifinals

Date	Time		Score		Set 1	Set 2	Set 3	Set 4	Set 5	Total	Report
10 July	16:00	Hong Kong	3–0	Mongolia	25–16	25–22	25–23			75–61	Result
10 July	19:00	China	3–0	South Korea	25–17	27–25	27–25			79–67	Result
11 July	16:00	Hong Kong	0–3	South Korea	18–25	23–25	23–25			64–75	Result
11 July	19:00	China	3–0	Mongolia	25–15	25–16	25–20			75–51	Result
12 July	16:00	South Korea	3–0	Mongolia	25–17	25–14	25–19			75–50	Result
12 July	19:00	China	3–0	Hong Kong	25–23	25–20	25–20			75–63	Result

=== Pool B ===
Pos	Team	Pld	W	L	Pts	SW	SL	SR	SPW	SPL	SPR	Qualification
1	Japan	3	3	0	9	9	1	9.000	245	173	1.416	Semifinals
2	North Korea	3	2	1	6	7	3	2.333	227	189	1.201	Semifinals
3	Chinese Taipei	3	1	2	3	3	6	0.500	183	179	1.022	5th–8th semifinals
4	Macau	3	0	3	0	0	9	0.000	111	225	0.493	5th–8th semifinals

Date	Time		Score		Set 1	Set 2	Set 3	Set 4	Set 5	Total	Report
10 July	12:00	Chinese Taipei	0–3	Japan	15–25	20–25	22–25			57–75	Result
10 July	14:00	North Korea	3–0	Macau	25–12	25–15	25–16			75–43	Result
11 July	12:00	North Korea	1–3	Japan	15–25	25–20	18–25	19–25		77–95	Result
11 July	14:00	Chinese Taipei	3–0	Macau	25–6	25–9	25–14			75–29	Result
12 July	12:00	Chinese Taipei	0–3	North Korea	19–25	17–25	15–25			51–75	Result
12 July	14:00	Japan	3–0	Macau	25–10	25–12	25–17			75–39	Result

== Final round ==
- All times are China standard time (UTC+08:00).

=== 5th–8th places ===
5th–8th semifinals
14 July
Mongolia	0
Chinese Taipei	3
14 July
Hong Kong	3
Macau	0

5th place match
15 July
Chinese Taipei	2
Hong Kong	3
7th place match
15 July
Mongolia	3
Macau	0

==== 5th–8th semifinals ====
Date	Time		Score		Set 1	Set 2	Set 3	Set 4	Set 5	Total	Report
14 July	12:00	Mongolia	0–3	Chinese Taipei	17–25	21–25	13–25			51–75	Result
14 July	14:00	Hong Kong	3–0	Macau	25–12	25–10	25–11			75–33	Result

==== 7th place match ====
Date	Time		Score		Set 1	Set 2	Set 3	Set 4	Set 5	Total	Report
15 July	12:00	Mongolia	3–0	Macau	25–13	25–17	25–19			75–49	Result

==== 5th place match ====
Date	Time		Score		Set 1	Set 2	Set 3	Set 4	Set 5	Total	Report
15 July	14:00	Chinese Taipei	2–3	Hong Kong	21–25	25–14	18–25	25–20	11–15	100–99	Result

=== Final four ===
Semifinals
14 July
Japan	3
South Korea	0
14 July
China	3
North Korea	2

Final
15 July
Japan	3
China	0
3rd place match
15 July
South Korea	0
North Korea	3

==== Semifinals ====
Date	Time		Score		Set 1	Set 2	Set 3	Set 4	Set 5	Total	Report
14 July	16:00	Japan	3–0	South Korea	25–13	25–17	25–11			75–41	Result
14 July	19:00	China	3–2	North Korea	25–21	21–25	25–27	25–23	15–12	111–108	Result

==== 3rd place match ====
Date	Time		Score		Set 1	Set 2	Set 3	Set 4	Set 5	Total	Report
24 July	16:00	South Korea	0–3	North Korea	20–25	20–25	19–25			59–75	Result

==== Final ====
Date	Time		Score		Set 1	Set 2	Set 3	Set 4	Set 5	Total	Report
24 July	19:00	Japan	3–0	China	25–14	25–20	25–15			75–49	Result

== Final standing ==
Rank	Team
1st place, gold medalist(s)	Japan
2nd place, silver medalist(s)	China
3rd place, bronze medalist(s)	North Korea
4	South Korea
5	Hong Kong
6	Chinese Taipei
7	Mongolia
8	Macau

2018 AVC Eastern Women's champions

Japan
5th title

== Awards ==
- MVP: (Japan) Chinami Furuya
- Best Coach: (Japan) Ken Nemoto
