= Pornpun Guedpard =

Thai volleyball player (born 1993)

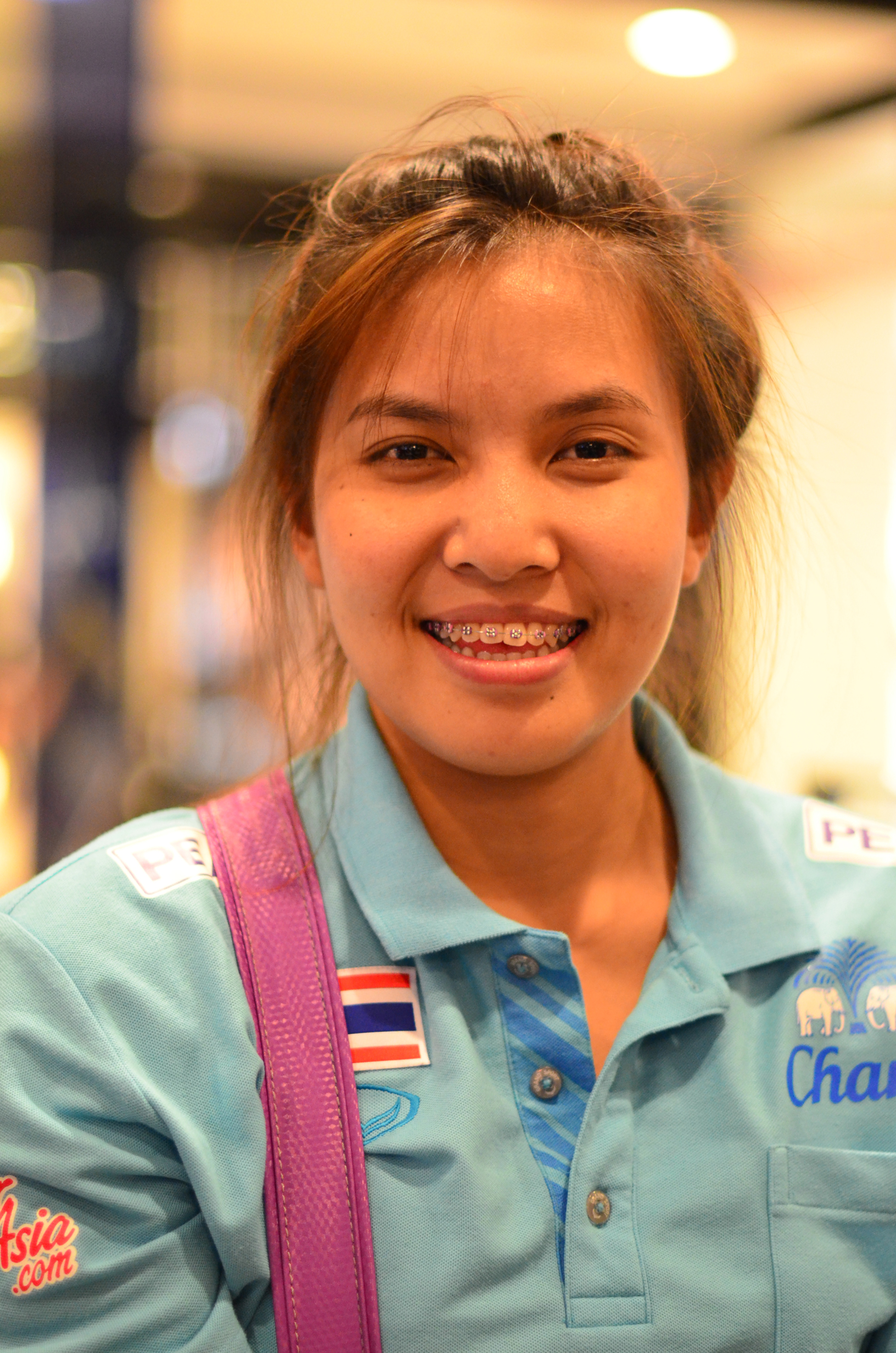
- Guedpard in 2013

Personal information
- Nickname: Chompoo
- Nationality: Thai
- Born: May 5, 1993 (age 33); Nakhon Phanom, Thailand
- Height: 1.73 m (5 ft 8 in)
- Weight: 63 kg (139 lb)
- Spike: 290 cm (114 in)
- Block: 285 cm (112 in)

Volleyball information
- Position: Setter
- Current club: (United States) San Francisco Signal
- Number: 3

National team
2012–	Thailand
Honours
Women's volleyball
Representing Thailand
Summer Universiade
Bronze medal – third place	2013 Kazan	Team
Montreux Volley Masters
Silver medal – second place	2016 Switzerland	Team
Asian Games
Silver medal – second place	2018 Jakarta/Palembang	Team
Bronze medal – third place	2022 Hangzhou	Team
Bronze medal – third place	2026 Aichi/Nagoya	Team
AVC Continental Championship
Gold medal – first place	2013 Nakhon Ratchasima	Team
Gold medal – first place	2023 Nakhon Ratchasima	Team
Gold medal – first place	2026 Tianjin	Team
Silver medal – second place	2017 Biñan	Team
Silver medal – second place	2019 Seoul	Team
Bronze medal – third place	2015 Tianjin	Team
Asian Cup
Gold medal – first place	2012 Almaty	Team
Bronze medal – third place	2016 Vĩnh Phúc	Team
Bronze medal – third place	2018 Nakhon Ratchasima	Team
Bronze medal – third place	2022 Pasig	Team
Southeast Asian Games
Gold medal – first place	2013 Naypyidaw	Team
Gold medal – first place	2015 Singapore	Team
Gold medal – first place	2017 Kuala Lumpur	Team
Gold medal – first place	2019 Pasig	Team
Gold medal – first place	2021 Quảng Ninh	Team
Gold medal – first place	2023 Cambodia	Team
Gold medal – first place	2025 Thailand	Team
ASEAN Grand Prix
Gold medal – first place	2019 Nakhon Ratchasima	Team
SEA V.League
Gold medal – first place	2022 Nakhon Ratchasima	Team
Gold medal – first place	2023 Vietnam	Team
Gold medal – first place	2023 Chiang Mai	Team
Gold medal – first place	2024 Vĩnh Phúc	Team

Pornpun Guedpard (Thai: พรพรรณ เกิดปราชญ์; RTGS: Phonphan Koetprat; born May 5, 1993) is a Thai volleyball player. She is the captain and a member of the Thailand women's national volleyball team.

== Clubs ==
- (Thailand) Chang (2011–2012)
- (Thailand) Nonthaburi (2011–2013)
- (Thailand) Sisaket (2013–2014)
- (Thailand) Bangkok Glass (2014–2017)
- (Indonesia) Jakarta PGN Popsivo Polwan (2018–2019)
- (Thailand) Thai-Denmark Khonkaen Star (2019–2020)
- (Japan) Toyota Auto Body Queenseis (2020–2021)
- (Indonesia) Jakarta PGN Popsivo Polwan (2021–2022)
- (Romania) CS Rapid Bucuresti (2022–2023)
- (South Korea) Hwaseong IBK Altos (2023–2024)
- (United States) Orlando Valkyries (2024–2026)
- (United States) San Francisco Signal (2027–)

== Awards ==
=== Individuals ===
- 2015 Asian Club Championship – "Best Setter"
- 2015 CH7 University Championship – "Most Valuable Player"
- 2016 Thai-Denmark Super League – "Most Valuable Player"
- 2016 Asian Club Championship – "Best Setter"
- 2017 VTV Binh Dien International Cup – "Best Setter"
- 2020 Thailand League – "Best Setter"
- 2022 Indonesian Proliga – "Best Setter"
- 2022 AVC Cup – "Best Setter"
- 2022 ASEAN Grand Prix – "Best Setter"
- 2023 Asian Championship – "Best Setter"
- 2025 Pro Volleyball Federation Championship – "Most Valuable Player"
- 2025 SEA V.League – "Best Setter"
- 2026 AVC Continental Championship – "Most Valuable Player"
- 2026 AVC Continental Championship – "Best Setter"

=== Clubs ===
- 2011–12 Thailand League – Champion, with Nakornnonthaburi
- 2012–13 Thailand League – Runner-up, with Nakornnonthaburi
- 2013–14 Thailand League – Runner-up, with Sisaket
- 2014–15 Thailand League – Champion, with Bangkok Glass
- 2015–16 Thailand League – Champion, with Bangkok Glass
- 2016–17 Thailand League – Runner-up, with Bangkok Glass
- 2015 Thai-Denmark Super League – Champion, with Bangkok Glass
- 2016 Thai-Denmark Super League – Champion, with Bangkok Glass
- 2017 Thai-Denmark Super League – Runner-up, with Bangkok Glass
- 2018 Thai-Denmark Super League – Runner-up, with Bangkok Glass
- 2012 Asian Club Championship – Bronze medal, with Chang
- 2015 Asian Club Championship – Champion, with Bangkok Glass
- 2016 Asian Club Championship – Bronze medal, with Bangkok Glass
- 2018–19 Indonesian Proliga – Champions, with Jakarta Popsivo
- 2019 Thai-Denmark Super League – Bronze medal, with Thai-Denmark Khonkaen Star
- 2020 Thailand League – Runner-up, with Khonkaen Star
- 2022 Indonesian Proliga - 3rd place, with Jakarta Mandiri Popsivo Polwan
- 2025 Pro Volleyball Federation - Champions, with Orlando Valkyries

== Royal decorations ==
- 2013 – Commander (Third Class) of The Most Exalted Order of the White Elephant
- 2023 – Commander (Third Class) of The Most Admirable Order of the Direkgunabhorn
