= 2016 Eastern Asian Women's Volleyball Championship =

2016 AVC Eastern Zonal Women's Volleyball Championship
Tournament details
- Host country: China
- City: Zhangjiagang
- Dates: 19–24 July 2016
- Teams: 8
- Venue: 1 (in 1 host city)

Final positions
- Champions: Chinese Taipei (3rd title)

Tournament awards
- MVP: (Chinese Taipei) Wu Weihua

The 2016 Eastern Asian Women's Volleyball Championship was the 10th edition of the AVC Eastern Zonal Women's Volleyball Championship, the volleyball championship of East Asia. It was held in Zhangjiagang, China from 19 to 24 July 2016.

Chinese Taipei won their third title, defeating Japan in the final, 3–1. Wu Weihua was elected the most valuable player.

== Pools composition ==
Pool A	Pool B
China	Japan
South Korea	Chinese Taipei
Macau	Hong Kong
Mongolia	North Korea

== Preliminary round ==
- All times are China standard time (UTC+08:00).

=== Pool A ===
Pos	Team	Pld	W	L	Pts	SW	SL	SR	SPW	SPL	SPR	Qualification
1	China	3	3	0	9	9	0	MAX	225	133	1.692	Semifinals
2	South Korea	3	2	1	6	6	3	2.000	210	171	1.228	Semifinals
3	Mongolia	3	1	2	3	3	6	0.500	159	209	0.761	5th–8th semifinals
4	Macau	3	0	3	0	0	9	0.000	145	226	0.642	5th–8th semifinals

Date	Time		Score		Set 1	Set 2	Set 3	Set 4	Set 5	Total	Report
19 July	16:00	South Korea	3–0	Macau	25–22	25–13	25–13			75–48	Result
19 July	19:00	China	3–0	Mongolia	25–11	25–14	25–10			75–35	Result
20 July	16:00	Mongolia	3–0	Macau	25–19	26–25	25–16			76–60	Result
20 July	19:00	China	3–0	South Korea	25–23	25–23	25–14			75–60	Result
21 July	16:00	South Korea	3–0	Mongolia	25–18	25–17	25–13			75–48	Result
21 July	19:00	China	3–0	Macau	25–17	25–9	25–12			75–38	Result

=== Pool B ===
Pos	Team	Pld	W	L	Pts	SW	SL	SR	SPW	SPL	SPR	Qualification
1	Japan	3	3	0	8	9	2	4.500	261	207	1.261	Semifinals
2	Chinese Taipei	3	2	1	6	6	3	2.000	202	166	1.217	Semifinals
3	North Korea	3	1	2	4	5	6	0.833	233	227	1.026	5th–8th semifinals
4	Hong Kong	3	0	3	0	0	9	0.000	129	225	0.573	5th–8th semifinals

Date	Time		Score		Set 1	Set 2	Set 3	Set 4	Set 5	Total	Report
19 July	12:00	Japan	3–2	North Korea	25–23	22–25	20–25	29–27	15–9	111–109	Result
19 July	14:00	Chinese Taipei	3–0	Hong Kong	25–9	25–18	25–15			75–42	Result
20 July	12:00	Japan	3–0	Chinese Taipei	25–15	25–20	25–17			75–52	Result
20 July	14:00	North Korea	3–0	Hong Kong	25–15	25–9	25–17			75–41	Result
21 July	12:00	Chinese Taipei	3–0	North Korea	25–16	25–16	25–17			75–49	Result
21 July	14:00	Japan	3–0	Hong Kong	25–16	25–15	25–15			75–46	Result

== Final round ==
- All times are China standard time (UTC+08:00).

=== 5th–8th places ===
5th–8th semifinals
23 July
North Korea	3
Macau	0
23 July
Hong Kong	3
Mongolia	0

5th place match
24 July
North Korea	3
Hong Kong	0
7th place match
24 July
Macau	2
Mongolia	3

==== 5th–8th semifinals ====
Date	Time		Score		Set 1	Set 2	Set 3	Set 4	Set 5	Total	Report
23 July	12:00	North Korea	3–0	Macau	25–1	25–14	25–9			75–24	
23 July	14:00	Hong Kong	3–0	Mongolia	25–17	25–15	28–26			78–58	

==== 7th place match ====
Date	Time		Score		Set 1	Set 2	Set 3	Set 4	Set 5	Total	Report
24 July	12:00	Macau	2–3	Mongolia	20–25	15–25	26–24	25–23	12–15	98–112	

==== 5th place match ====
Date	Time		Score		Set 1	Set 2	Set 3	Set 4	Set 5	Total	Report
24 July	14:00	North Korea	3–0	Hong Kong	25–20	25–16	25–18			75–54	

=== Final four ===
Semifinals
23 July
Chinese Taipei	3
China	1
23 July
Japan	3
South Korea	0

Final
24 July
Chinese Taipei	3
Japan	1
3rd place match
24 July
China	3
South Korea	0

==== Semifinals ====
Date	Time		Score		Set 1	Set 2	Set 3	Set 4	Set 5	Total	Report
23 July	16:00	Chinese Taipei	3–1	China	28–26	25–21	22–25	27–25		102–97	
23 July	19:00	Japan	3–0	South Korea	25–16	25–21	25–15			75–52	

==== 3rd place match ====
Date	Time		Score		Set 1	Set 2	Set 3	Set 4	Set 5	Total	Report
24 July	16:00	China	3–0	South Korea	25–22	25–11	25–15			75–48	

==== Final ====
Date	Time		Score		Set 1	Set 2	Set 3	Set 4	Set 5	Total	Report
24 July	19:00	Chinese Taipei	3–1	Japan	14–25	25–22	25–19	25–23		89–89	

== Final standing ==
Rank	Team
1st place, gold medalist(s)	Chinese Taipei
2nd place, silver medalist(s)	Japan
3rd place, bronze medalist(s)	China
4	South Korea
5	North Korea
6	Hong Kong
7	Mongolia
8	Macau

2016 AVC Eastern Women's champions

Chinese Taipei
3rd title

== Awards ==
- MVP: (Chinese Taipei) Wu Weihua
- Best Coach: (Chinese Taipei) Lin Minghui
