= Asian Eastern Zonal Women's Volleyball Championship =

International volleyball competition

- Most recent season or competition: 2026 Asian Eastern Zonal Women's Volleyball Championship
- Sport: Volleyball
- Founded: 1998
- First season: 1998
- No. of teams: 8
- Continent: East Asia (AVC)
- Most recent champion: Japan (6th title)
- Most titles: Japan (6 titles)
- Website: Asian Volleyball Confederation

Asian Eastern Zonal Women's Volleyball Championship is an international volleyball competition in East Asia for national teams of the Eastern Asia Zonal Volleyball Association (EAZVA). Tournaments have been awarded every two years since 1998 until 2018. The current champion is China, which won its fifth title at the 2025 edition.

== Results summary ==
| Year | Host | Final | | | Third place match | | | Teams |
| Year | Host | Champions | Score | Runners-up | 3rd place | Score | 4th place | Teams |
|---|---|---|---|---|---|---|---|---|
| 1998; Details | Macau | China | | Japan | Chinese Taipei | | Hong Kong | 6 |
| 2000; Details | (Mongolia); Ulaanbaatar | Japan | | Mongolia | China | | Hong Kong | 4 |
| 2002; Details | (China); Shanghai | China | | Chinese Taipei | Japan | | South Korea | 7 |
| 2004; Details | (China); Taicang | Japan | | North Korea | Chinese Taipei | | China | 5 |
| 2006; Details | (Chinese Taipei); Pingtung | Chinese Taipei | Round-robin | Japan | China | Round-robin | Hong Kong | 5 |
| 2008; Details | (Mongolia); Ulaanbaatar | Japan | | China | Mongolia | | Chinese Taipei | 6 |
| 2010; Details | (South Korea); Jeju | Chinese Taipei | 3–1 | South Korea | Japan | 3–0 | Mongolia | 5 |
| 2012; Details | (China); Beijing | China | Round-robin | Japan | Chinese Taipei | Round-robin | Hong Kong | 6 |
| 2014; Details | Hong Kong | Japan | 3–0 | China | Chinese Taipei | 3–1 | South Korea | 7 |
| 2016; Details | (China); Zhangjiagang | Chinese Taipei | 3–1 | Japan | China | 3–0 | South Korea | 8 |
| 2018; Details | (China); Zhangjiagang | Japan | 3–0 | China | North Korea | 3–0 | South Korea | 8 |
| 2021 | (China); Zhangjiagang | Canceled due to COVID-19 pandemic | | | | | | |
| 2024; Details | Hong Kong | China | 3–0 | Japan | North Korea | 3–1 | South Korea | 8 |
| 2025; Details | Hong Kong | China | 3–1 | Chinese Taipei | South Korea | 3–0 | Hong Kong | 6 |
| 2026; Details | Hong Kong | Japan | 3–0 | China | South Korea | 3–0 | Hong Kong | 7 |

=== Teams reaching the top four ===
| Team | Titles | Runners-up | Third Place | Fourth Place | Total Top Four |
|---|---|---|---|---|---|
| Japan | 6 (2000, 2004, 2008, 2014, 2018, 2026) | 5 (1998, 2006, 2012, 2016, 2024) | 2 (2002, 2010) | – | 13 |
| China | 5 (2014, 2002, 2012, 2024, 2025) | 4 (2008, 1998, 2018, 2026) | 3 (2000, 2006, 2016) | 1 (2010) | 13 |
| Chinese Taipei | 3 (2006, 2010, 2016) | 2 (2002, 2025) | 4 (1998, 2004, 2012, 2014) | 1 (2008) | 10 |
| South Korea | – | 1 (2010) | 2 (2025, 2026) | 5 (2002, 2014, 2016, 2018, 2024) | 8 |
| North Korea | – | 1 (2004) | 2 (2018, 2024) | – | 3 |
| Mongolia | – | 1 (2000) | 1 (2008) | 1 (2010) | 3 |
| Hong Kong | – | – | – | 6 (1998, 2000, 2006, 2012, 2025, 2026) | 6 |

== Medal summary ==
| Rank | Nation | Gold | Silver | Bronze | Total |
|---|---|---|---|---|---|
| 1 | Japan | 6 | 5 | 2 | 13 |
| 2 | China | 5 | 4 | 3 | 12 |
| 3 | Chinese Taipei | 3 | 2 | 4 | 9 |
| 4 | North Korea | 0 | 1 | 2 | 3 |
| 4 | South Korea | 0 | 1 | 2 | 3 |
| 6 | Mongolia | 0 | 1 | 1 | 2 |
| Totals (6 entries) | | 14 | 14 | 14 | 42 |

== Participating nations ==
| Team | (Macau) 1998 | (Mongolia) 2000 | (China) 2002 | (China) 2004 | (Chinese Taipei) 2006 | (Mongolia) 2008 | (South Korea) 2010 | (China) 2012 | (Hong Kong) 2014 | (China) 2016 | (China) 2018 | (Hong Kong) 2024 | (Hong Kong) 2025 | (Hong Kong) 2026 | Total |
|---|---|---|---|---|---|---|---|---|---|---|---|---|---|---|---|
| China | 1st | 3rd | 1st | 4th | 3rd | 2nd | • | 1st | 2nd | 3rd | 2nd | 1st | 1st | 2nd | 13 |
| Chinese Taipei | 3rd | • | 2nd | 3rd | 1st | 4th | 1st | 3rd | 3rd | 1st | 6th | 5th | 2nd | 5th | 13 |
| Hong Kong | 4th | 4th | 6th | 5th | 4th | 5th | 5th | 4th | 5th | 6th | 5th | 6th | 4th | 4th | 14 |
| Japan | 2nd | 1st | 3rd | 1st | 2nd | 1st | 3rd | 2nd | 1st | 2nd | 1st | 2nd | • | 1st | 13 |
| Macau | 6th | • | 7th | • | 5th | 6th | 6th | 6th | 6th | 8th | 8th | 8th | 6th | 7th | 12 |
| Mongolia | 5th | 2nd | 5th | • | • | 3rd | 4th | 5th | 7th | 7th | 7th | 7th | 5th | 6th | 12 |
| North Korea | • | • | • | 2nd | • | • | • | • | • | 5th | 3rd | 3rd | • | • | 4 |
| South Korea | • | • | 4th | • | • | • | 2nd | • | 4th | 4th | 4th | 4th | 3rd | 3rd | 8 |

== Awards ==
=== Most Valuable Player ===
| Year | Players |
|---|---|
| 2014 | (China) Zhang Yungyi |
| 2016 | (Chinese Taipei) Wu Weihua |
| 2018 | (Japan) Chinami Furuya |
| 2024 | (China) Li Chenxuan |
| 2025 | (China) Li Chenxuan |
| 2026 | (Japan) Sae Omori |

=== Best Coach ===
| Year | Best Coach |
|---|---|
| 2014 | (Japan) Fujii Masahiro |
| 2016 | (Chinese Taipei) Lin Minghui |
| 2018 | (Japan) Ken Nemoto |
| 2024 | (China) Kuang Qi |
| 2025 | (China) Xie Jiyang |

== See also ==
- Asian Eastern Zonal Men's Volleyball Championship
- Asian Women's Volleyball Championship
- AVC Women's Volleyball Nations Cup
