= Mongolia women's national volleyball team =

National volleyball team

Mongolia
- Association: Mongolia Volleyball Federation
- Confederation: AVC
- Head coach: (Serbia) Moro Branislav
- FIVB ranking: 99 ▼6 (2 October 2026)

Uniforms
Home	Away

World Championship
- Appearances: 1 (First in 1970)
- Best result: 16th (1970)
Honours
Silver medal – second place	2000 Ulaanbaatar	Team
Bronze medal – third place	2008 Ulaanbaatar	Team
	2010 Jeju	Team
	2022 Guangzhou	Team
	2024 Hong Kong	Team
	2025 Hong Kong	Team
	2026 Hong Kong	Team

The Mongolia women's national volleyball team represents Mongolia in international women's volleyball competitions and friendly matches.

It qualified for the Asian Women's Volleyball Championship in 2013 and 2015.

It won the silver medal at the 2000 Eastern Asian Women's Volleyball Championship and the bronze medal at the 2008 Eastern Asian Women's Volleyball Championship.

== History ==
=== Formation and early years ===
The Mongolia women's national volleyball team was established in 1958, after the Mongolian Volleyball Association was established and joined the Fédération Internationale de Volleyball (FIVB) in 1957.

The first national team was coached by Ts. Shagdar, with Ts. Lkhamjav as team captain. The inaugural squad consisted of Ts. Shoovdor, D. Lkhagvajav, J. Oyunchimeg, O. Yagaantsetseg, B. Badamkhand, D. Natsag and V. Sengee.

The team made its first international appearances during the 1960s, competing in tournaments involving national teams from socialist countries. Mongolia subsequently participated in the Summer Universiade, the FIVB Women's Volleyball World Championship and other international competitions.

=== First international competitions ===
==== Four-Nation Volleyball Tournament of Socialist Countries ====
Mongolia's women's national team made its first recorded international tournament appearance at the Four-Nation Volleyball Tournament of Socialist Countries, also known as the Four-Nation Friendly Tournament.

Mongolia finished fourth at both tournaments in which it participated:

Year	Host city	Result	Squad
1960	Beijing, China	4th place	Ts. Shoovdor; P. Borkhuu; D. Javzandulam; B. Mishigdulam; Ts. Lkhamjav; Ch. Oyuntsetseg; D. Altantsetseg; O. Yagaantsetseg; Ya. Sodgerel; J. Oyunchimeg
1961	Hanoi, North Vietnam	4th place	

==== All-Union Sports Games of Socialist Youth ====
In 1969, Mongolia participated in the All-Union Sports Games of Socialist Youth in Tashkent. The competition involved teams representing the Soviet Union, North Korea, North Vietnam and Mongolia. Mongolia finished fourth.

==== International Industrial Cooperatives Volleyball Championship ====
The Mongolia women's national team participated in the International Industrial Cooperatives Volleyball Championship of Socialist Countries (Mongolian: Социалист орнуудын Үйлдвэр хоршооллын байгууллагуудын аварга шалгаруулах тэмцээн) during the 1960s and 1970s.

Mongolia finished fourth at the 1969 edition in Hungary and subsequently won three bronze medals and one silver medal. The 1972 edition in Sofia, Bulgaria, was the first occasion on which the Mongolia women's national volleyball team won an international medal.

Year	Host country	Result	Squad
1969	Hungary	4th place	name 1; name 2
1972	Bulgaria	Bronze medal	name 1; name 2
1975	Hungary	Bronze medal	name 1; name 2
1976	Poland	Bronze medal	name 1; name 2
1979	Mongolia	Silver medal	name 1; name 2

==== Summer Universiade ====
Mongolia has also participated in women's volleyball at the Summer Universiade, the international multi-sport competition for university athletes, formerly known as the Universiade.

Year	Host city	Result	Squad
1965	Budapest, Hungary	9th place	Ts. Shoovdor; P. Borkhuu; P. Khandsuren; Ya. Otgonsuren; S. Alimaa; J. Tsendsuren; D. Tserendolgor; P. Narangerel; Ch. Oyuntsetseg; Ya. Sodgerel
1977	Sofia, Bulgaria	16th place	Ts. Shoovdor; P. Khandsuren; B. Mart; N. Chimedregzen; S. Ganbold; Kh. Khandsuren; D. Solongo; M. Gaamaa; D. Gansukh; Coach: D. Choidorj
2009	Belgrade, Serbia	16th place	name 1; name 2
2025	Berlin, Germany	11th place	name 1; name 2

==== 1970 World Championship ====
Mongolia made its debut at the FIVB Women's Volleyball World Championship in 1970. The tournament was held in Bulgaria, and Mongolia finished 16th overall in its first appearance at the world championship. Eight of the 12 members of the national team at the time were selected to compete at the World Championship. The team was coached by Yun En-bon and captained by P. Borkhuu.

Year	Host city	Result	Squad
1970	Bulgaria	16th place	Ts. Shoovdor; P. Borkuu; P. Khandsuren; S. Unenbat; B. Mart; S. Alimaa; Ya. Otgonsuren; Kh. Khandsuren; Head of delegation: B. Tserennorov

=== Coaches ===
The following coaches are recorded as having coached the Mongolia women's national volleyball team:

Period	Coach
1958–1959	Ts. Shagdar
1959–1960	Ya. Jantsan
1961–1969	Kh. Dorjjugder
1967–1969	J. Khayankhyarvaa
1969–1973	Ts. Shoovdor
1973	Ch. Demchig
1974–1978	D. Choidorj
1978–1983	Ts. Shoovdor
1984	D. Choidorj
1985–1986	D. Solongo
1987–1988	D. Khalzan
1988–1990	D. Namuunbayar
1991–1992	O. Odbayar; S. Ganbat
1993–1994	Ts. Shoovdor; B. Enkhtuya
1995–2000	D. Khalzan; D. Baasansuren

=== Women volleyball Masters of Sport ===
During the early development of volleyball in Mongolia, the title of Master of Sport was awarded to players who won the national championship three consecutive times. The following volleyball players were awarded the title between 1962 and 1984:

No.	Athlete	Date of birth	Year awarded
1	Ts. Shoovdor		1962
2	P. Borkhuu		1970
3	D. Tserendolgor		1970
4	Kh. Khultaa		1971
5	Ya. Otgonsuren		1971
6	S. Alimaa		1971
7	P. Khandsuren		1972
8	S. Unenbat		1974
9	Kh. Khandsuren		1974
10	B. Mart		1974
11	N. Chimedregzen		1975
12	S. Ganbold		1976
13	B. Enkhtuya		1981
14	D. Solongo		1981
15	B. Tsetsegdelger		1983
16	B. Bolormaa		1983
17	S. Tsetsegmaa		1983
18	G. Tanya		1983
19	B. Bat-Erdene		1983
20	D. Dashdolgor		1983
20	L. Badamsuren		1984

== Competition record ==
=== World Championship ===
- (Soviet Union) 1952 did not qualify
- (France) 1956 did not qualify
- (Brazil) 1960 did not qualify
- (Soviet Union) 1962 did not qualify
- (Japan) 1967 did not qualify
- (Bulgaria) 1970 - 16th place
- (Mexico) 1974 did not qualify
- (Soviet Union) 1978 did not qualify
- (Peru) 1982 did not qualify
- (Czechoslovakia) 1986 did not qualify
- (China) 1990 did not qualify
- (Brazil) 1994 did not qualify
- (Japan) 1998 did not qualify
- (Germany) 2002 did not qualify
- (Japan) 2006 did not qualify
- (Japan) 2010 did not qualify
- (Italy) 2014 did not qualify
- (Japan) 2018 did not qualify
- (Netherlands) (Poland) 2022 did not qualify
- (Thailand) 2025 did not qualify
- (United States) (Canada) 2027 did not qualify
- (Philippines) 2029 to be determined

=== Asian Games ===
- (Japan) 1994 — 6th place
- (Qatar) 2006 — 8th place
- (China) 2010 — 8th place
- (China) 2022 — 12th place
- (Japan) 2026 — 11th place

=== Asian Championship ===
- (Thailand) 2013 — 14th place
- (China) 2015 — 11th place
- (Thailand) 2023 — 12th place
- (China) 2026 did not qualify

=== Asian Nations Cup ===
- (Indonesia) 2023 — 10th place
- (Vietnam) 2025 — 10th place
- (Philippines) 2026 did not qualify

=== Eastern Asian Championship ===
- (Mongolia) 2000 — Silver Medal
- (Mongolia) 2008 — Bronze Medal
- (South Korea) 2010 — 4th place
- (China) 2016 — 7th place
- (China) 2018 — 7th place
- (Hong Kong) 2024 — 7th place
- (Hong Kong) 2025 — 5th place
- (Hong Kong) 2026 — 6th place

== 2010 fixtures and results ==
		Rank
Jeju, Republic of Korea	Japan	Rank
3–0		Rank

=== 2016 Eastern Asian Women's Volleyball Championship ===
- Dates: 19–24 July
- Host Countries: China

=== 2016 fixtures and results ===
Date	Time		Score		Set 1	Set 2	Set 3	Set 4	Set 5	Total	Report
19 July	19:00	China	3–0	Mongolia	25–11	25–14	25–10			75–35	Result
20 July	16:00	Mongolia	3–0	Macau	25–19	26–25	25–16			76–60	Result
21 July	16:00	South Korea	3–0	Mongolia	25–18	25–17	25–13			75–48	Result

==== 5th–8th semifinals ====
Date	Time		Score		Set 1	Set 2	Set 3	Set 4	Set 5	Total	Report
23 July	14:00	Hong Kong	3–0	Mongolia	25–17	25–15	28–26			78–58	

=== 2018 Eastern Asian Women's Volleyball Championship ===
- Dates: 10–15 July
- Host Countries: China

=== 2018 fixtures and results ===
Date	Time		Score		Set 1	Set 2	Set 3	Set 4	Set 5	Total	Report
10 July	16:00	Hong Kong	3–0	Mongolia	25–16	25–22	25–23			75–61	Result
11 July	19:00	China	3–0	Mongolia	25–15	25–16	25–20			75–51	Result
12 July	16:00	South Korea	3–0	Mongolia	25–17	25–14	25–19			75–50	Result

=== 2023 Women's Asian Volleyball Challenge Cup ===
- Dates:18–25 June
- Host Countries: Indonesia

=== 2023 fixtures and results ===
Date	Time		Score		Set 1	Set 2	Set 3	Set 4	Set 5	Total	Report
18 Jun	19:00	Vietnam	3–0	Mongolia	25–12	25–17	25–12			75–41	Report
20 Jun	16:30	Mongolia	2–3	Uzbekistan	20–25	25–14	25–15	16–25	10–15	96–94	Report
21 Jun	09:00	Hong Kong	3–2	Mongolia	25–21	25–14	22–25	22–25	15–12	109–97	Report
24 Jun	09:00	Mongolia	3–0	Macau	25–9	25–11	25–14			75–34	Report

=== 2023 Asian Women's Volleyball Championship ===
- Dates:30 August – 6 September 2023
- Host Countries: Thailand

=== 2023 fixtures and results ===
Date	Time	Venue		Score		Set 1	Set 2	Set 3	Set 4	Set 5	Total	Report
3 Sep	15:00	MCC	Mongolia	3–0	Uzbekistan	25–15	25–19	25–16			75–50	Report

==== 9th–12th semifinals ====
Date	Time	Venue		Score		Set 1	Set 2	Set 3	Set 4	Set 5	Total	Report
5 Sep	18:00	MCC	Mongolia	0–3	Iran	18–25	12–25	20–25			50–75	Report

==== 11th place match ====
Date	Time	Venue		Score		Set 1	Set 2	Set 3	Set 4	Set 5	Total	Report
6 Sep	13:00	MCC	Hong Kong	3–2	Mongolia	25–19	16–25	25–27	25–20	15–7	106–98	Report

=== 2023 ===
30 September 2023; 19:00	Chinese Taipei	3–0	Mongolia	China Textile City Sports Centre Gymnasium, Hangzhou; Attendance: 2,000; Referees: Agung Purwantoro (INA), Jang Jong Hyang (PRK)
30 September 2023; 19:00	(25–19, 25–12, 25–8); Result			China Textile City Sports Centre Gymnasium, Hangzhou; Attendance: 2,000; Referees: Agung Purwantoro (INA), Jang Jong Hyang (PRK)

2 October 2023; 14:30	Mongolia	0–3	Thailand	Deqing Sports Centre Gymnasium, Hangzhou; Attendance: 2,000; Referees: WANG Ziling (CHN), PURWANTORO Agung (INA)
2 October 2023; 14:30	(14–25, 20–25, 12–25); Result			Deqing Sports Centre Gymnasium, Hangzhou; Attendance: 2,000; Referees: WANG Ziling (CHN), PURWANTORO Agung (INA)

4 October 2023; 10:30	Mongolia	1–3	Hong Kong	Deqing Sports Centre Gymnasium, Hangzhou; Attendance: 2,000; Referees: WANG Chi Jui (TPE), SHAMS ARAHMAN ABDULLA A (QAT)
4 October 2023; 10:30	(21–25, 20–25, 25–18, 24–26); Result			Deqing Sports Centre Gymnasium, Hangzhou; Attendance: 2,000; Referees: WANG Chi Jui (TPE), SHAMS ARAHMAN ABDULLA A (QAT)

5 October 2023; 10:30	Mongolia	3–0	Afghanistan	Hangzhou Normal University Cangqian Gymnasium, Hangzhou
5 October 2023; 10:30	(25–0, 25–0, 25–0)			Hangzhou Normal University Cangqian Gymnasium, Hangzhou

==== Semifinals ====
6 October 2023; 10:30	India	3–0	Mongolia	Deqing Sports Centre Gymnasium, Hangzhou; Attendance: 2,000; Referees: CHAULAGAIN Purna Prasad (NEP), WANG Chi Ju (TPE)
6 October 2023; 10:30	(25–16, 25–20, 25–17); Report			Deqing Sports Centre Gymnasium, Hangzhou; Attendance: 2,000; Referees: CHAULAGAIN Purna Prasad (NEP), WANG Chi Ju (TPE)

==== 11th place match ====
7 October 2023; 10:30	Mongolia	2–3	Nepal	Deqing Sports Centre Gymnasium, Hangzhou; Attendance: 2,000; Referees: JANG Jong Hyang (PRK), KOKCHOLOKOV Nurgazy (KAZ)
7 October 2023; 10:30	(25–17, 18–25, 21–25, 25–18, 12–15); Result			Deqing Sports Centre Gymnasium, Hangzhou; Attendance: 2,000; Referees: JANG Jong Hyang (PRK), KOKCHOLOKOV Nurgazy (KAZ)

=== 2024 Eastern Asian Women's Volleyball Championship ===
Date	Time		Score		Set 1	Set 2	Set 3	Set 4	Set 5	Total	Report
13 August	20:00	Hong Kong	3–1	Mongolia	25–20	25–14	21–25	25-19		96–59	Result
14 August	17:30	North Korea	3–1	Mongolia	22–25	25–19	25–19	25–13		97–76	Result
15 August	14:00	Mongolia	0–3	South Korea	21–25	21–25	21–25			63–75	Result

==== 5th–8th semifinals ====
Date	Time		Score		Set 1	Set 2	Set 3	Set 4	Set 5	Total	Report
17 August	14:00	Chinese Taipei	3–0	Mongolia	25–17	25–15	25–15			75–47	

==== 7th place match ====
Date	Time		Score		Set 1	Set 2	Set 3	Set 4	Set 5	Total	Report
18 August	10:30	Mongolia	3–1	Macau	24–26	25–19	25–13	25–17		99–75	Result

=== AFC Women s Nations League ===
Date	Time		Score		Set 1	Set 2	Set 3	Set 4	Set 5	Total	Report
7 Jun	15:00	Philippines	3–0	Mongolia	25–18	25–16	25–14			75–48	P2 Report

Date	Time		Score		Set 1	Set 2	Set 3	Set 4	Set 5	Total	Report
8 Jun	10:00	Kazakhstan	3–1	Mongolia	25–14	24–26	25–18	25–15		99–73	P2 Report

Date	Time		Score		Set 1	Set 2	Set 3	Set 4	Set 5	Total	Report
9 Jun	20:00	Mongolia	2–3	New Zealand	22–25	20–25	25–10	25–20	13–15	105–95	P2 Report

Date	Time		Score		Set 1	Set 2	Set 3	Set 4	Set 5	Total	Report
11 Jun	17:30	Indonesia	3–0	Mongolia	25–18	25–21	25–23			75–62	P2 Report

==== 9th place match ====
Date	Time		Score		Set 1	Set 2	Set 3	Set 4	Set 5	Total	Report
14 Jun	10:00	India	3–1	Mongolia	25–23	21–25	25–18	25–20		96–86	P2 Report

=== 2025 Eastern Asian Women's Volleyball Championship ===
Date	Time		Score		Set 1	Set 2	Set 3	Set 4	Set 5	Total	Report
26 August	20:00	Chinese Taipei	3-0	Mongolia	25-16	25-22	25-22			75–0	

Date	Time		Score		Set 1	Set 2	Set 3	Set 4	Set 5	Total	Report
27 August	17:30	Mongolia	2-3	Hong Kong	25-23	25-23	26-28	23-25	11-15	110–0	

==== 5th–6th semifinals ====
Date	Time		Score		Set 1	Set 2	Set 3	Set 4	Set 5	Total	Report
30 August	14:30	Mongolia	3-0	Macau	25-11	25-12	25-18			75–0	

=== Volleyball at the 2026 Asian Games – Women's tournament ===
Date	Time		Score		Set 1	Set 2	Set 3	Set 4	Set 5	Total	Attd	Report
16 Sep	16:00	Thailand	3–0	Mongolia	25–12	25–18	25–18			75–48	1,350	P2 Report
17 Sep	16:00	Chinese Taipei	3–0	Mongolia	25–22	25–8	25–14			75–44	900	P2 Report
18 Sep	16:00	Mongolia	3–0	Kyrgyzstan	25–20	25–13	25–15			75–48	920	P2 Report

=== Classification 9th–12th ===
Date	Time		Score		Set 1	Set 2	Set 3	Set 4	Set 5	Total	Attd	Report
21 Sep	19:00	Philippines	3–0	Mongolia	25–13	25–11	25–20			75–44	660	P2 Report

=== 11th place match ===
Date	Time		Score		Set 1	Set 2	Set 3	Set 4	Set 5	Total	Attd	Report
22 Sep	16:00	Nepal	0–3	Mongolia	23–25	17–25	13–25			53–75	977	P2 Report
