= 2023 Asian Women's Volleyball Championship =

International indoor volleyball tournament

วอลเลย์บอลหญิงชิงแชมป์เอเชีย 2023
- Official logo

Tournament details
- Host country: Thailand
- City: Nakhon Ratchasima
- Dates: 30 August – 6 September 2023
- Teams: 14 (from 1 confederation)
- Venue: 2 (in 1 host city)

Final positions
- Champions: Thailand (3rd title)
- Runners-up: China
- Third place: Japan
- Fourth place: Vietnam

Tournament awards
- MVP: (Thailand) Chatchu-on Moksri
- Best Setter: (Thailand) Pornpun Guedpard
- Best OH: (Japan) Yuki Nishikawa; (China) Wu Mengjie
- Best MB: (Thailand) Thatdao Nuekjang; (China) Yang Hanyu
- Best OPP: (China) Zhou Yetong
- Best Libero: (Japan) Manami Kojima

Tournament statistics
- Matches played: 43
- Attendance: 40,100 (933 per match)

The 2023 Asian Women's Volleyball Championship was the 22nd staging of the Asian Women's Volleyball Championship, a biennial international volleyball tournament organised by the Asian Volleyball Confederation (AVC) with Thailand Volleyball Association (TVA). The tournament was held in Nakhon Ratchasima, Thailand from 30 August to 6 September 2023.

This is Thailand's sixth time serving as the host nation.

The host Thailand claimed their third title by defeating China in a tie-break final. Japan won the bronze medal after defeating Vietnam also in a five-set third place match. Chatchu-on Moksri named as the MVP of the tournament.

Thailand, China, and Japan, the top three teams of the tournament qualified for the 2025 FIVB Volleyball Women's World Championship as the AVC representatives. Eventually Thailand was chosen as hosts of the World Championship on 30 August 2024, and their qualification spot via Asian Championship was passed down to fourth-placed Vietnam.

== Qualification ==
Following the AVC regulations, The maximum of 16 teams in all AVC events will be selected by:

- 1 team for the host country
- 10 teams based on the final standing of the previous edition
- 5 teams from each of 5 zones (with a qualification tournament if needed)

=== Qualified teams ===
The AVC stated that there were originally fourteen entrant teams that were due to participate in the tournament.

Event(s)		Dates	Location	Berths	Qualifier(s)
Host nation		20 December 2022	—N/a	1	Thailand
2019 Asian Championship		18 – 25 August 2019	(South Korea) Seoul	9 (Note: The host Thailand was originally in top 10 of the previous edition. The spot was reallocated to Hong Kong (11th placers). Later, Indonesia (8th placers), New Zealand (12th placers), and Sri Lanka (13th placers) all withdrew from the tournament, left the number of teams qualified through the previous edition to nine.)	Japan; ~~Thailand~~; South Korea; China; Kazakhstan; Chinese Taipei; Iran; ~~Indonesia~~; Australia; India; Hong Kong; ~~New Zealand~~; ~~Sri Lanka~~
Direct zonal wildcards	Central Asia	2 February 2023	—N/a	1	Uzbekistan
Direct zonal wildcards	East Asia	2 February 2023	—N/a	1	Mongolia
Direct zonal wildcards	Southeast Asia	2 February 2023	—N/a	2	Philippines; Vietnam
Total				14	

== Pools composition ==
Teams were seeded in the first two positions of each pool following the serpentine system according to their previous rank. AVC reserved the right to seed the hosts as head of pool A regardless of the previous ranking. All teams not seeded were drawn to take other available positions in the remaining lines. Each pool had no more than three teams from the same zonal association. The draw was held in Bangkok, Thailand on 16 March 2023.

Ranking from the 2019 Asian Women's Volleyball Championship was shown in brackets except the host and the teams who did not participate, which were denoted by (–).

Pots

Seeded Teams	Pot 1
Thailand (Hosts); Japan (1); South Korea (3); China (4); Kazakhstan (5); Chinese Taipei (6); Iran (7); Australia (9)	India (10); Hong Kong (11); Mongolia (–); Philippines (–); Uzbekistan (–); Vietnam (–)

After the draw

Pool A	Pool B	Pool C	Pool D
Thailand	Japan	South Korea	China
Australia	Iran	Chinese Taipei	Kazakhstan
Mongolia	India	Vietnam	Hong Kong
—N/a		Uzbekistan	Philippines

== Venues ==
Assigned matches
Nakhon Ratchasima, Thailand
Korat Chatchai Hall (KCH)	MCC Hall (MCC)
Capacity: 5,000	Capacity: 3,000

== Pool standing procedure ==
1. Total number of victories (matches won, matches lost)
2. In the event of a tie, the following first tiebreaker will apply: The teams will be ranked by the most point gained per match as follows:
  - Match won 3–0 or 3–1: 3 points for the winner, 0 points for the loser
  - Match won 3–2: 2 points for the winner, 1 point for the loser
  - Match forfeited: 3 points for the winner, 0 points (0–25, 0–25, 0–25) for the loser
3. If teams are still tied after examining the number of victories and points gained, then the AVC will examine the results in order to break the tie in the following order:
  - Set quotient: if two or more teams are tied on the number of points gained, they will be ranked by the quotient resulting from the division of the number of all set won by the number of all sets lost.
  - Points quotient: if the tie persists based on the set quotient, the teams will be ranked by the quotient resulting from the division of all points scored by the total of points lost during all sets.
  - If the tie persists based on the point quotient, the tie will be broken based on the team that won the match of the Round Robin Phase between the tied teams. When the tie in point quotient is between three or more teams, these teams ranked taking into consideration only the matches involving the teams in question.

== Preliminary round ==
- All times are Indochina Time (UTC+07:00).

=== Pool A ===
Pos	Team	Pld	W	L	Pts	SW	SL	SR	SPW	SPL	SPR	Qualification
1	Thailand (H)	2	2	0	6	6	0	MAX	150	82	1.829	Pool E
2	Australia	2	1	1	3	3	3	1.000	128	129	0.992	Pool E
3	Mongolia	2	0	2	0	0	6	0.000	84	151	0.556	Pool G

Source: Women's Asian Senior Championship 2023
(H) Host

Date	Time	Venue		Score		Set 1	Set 2	Set 3	Set 4	Set 5	Total	Report
30 Aug	18:00	KCH	Australia	0–3	Thailand	14–25	16–25	22–25			52–75	Report
31 Aug	12:00	KCH	Mongolia	0–3	Australia	16–25	24–26	14–25			54–76	Report
1 Sep	18:00	KCH	Thailand	3–0	Mongolia	25–12	25–7	25–11			75–30	Report

=== Pool B ===
Pos	Team	Pld	W	L	Pts	SW	SL	SR	SPW	SPL	SPR	Qualification
1	Japan	2	2	0	6	6	0	MAX	150	88	1.705	Pool F
2	India	2	1	1	3	3	4	0.750	134	164	0.817	Pool F
3	Iran	2	0	2	0	1	6	0.167	145	177	0.819	Pool H

Source: Women's Asian Senior Championship 2023

Date	Time	Venue		Score		Set 1	Set 2	Set 3	Set 4	Set 5	Total	Report
30 Aug	12:00	KCH	Iran	0–3	Japan	18–25	16–25	22–25			56–75	Report
31 Aug	15:00	MCC	India	3–1	Iran	22–25	25–19	30–28	25–17		102–89	Report
1 Sep	12:00	KCH	Japan	3–0	India	25–10	25–16	25–6			75–32	Report

=== Pool C ===
Pos	Team	Pld	W	L	Pts	SW	SL	SR	SPW	SPL	SPR	Qualification
1	Vietnam	3	3	0	8	9	3	3.000	274	217	1.263	Pool E
2	South Korea	3	2	1	6	8	5	1.600	288	238	1.210	Pool E
3	Chinese Taipei	3	1	2	4	6	6	1.000	250	242	1.033	Pool G
4	Uzbekistan	3	0	3	0	0	9	0.000	110	225	0.489	Pool G

Source: Women's Asian Senior Championship 2023

Date	Time	Venue		Score		Set 1	Set 2	Set 3	Set 4	Set 5	Total	Report
30 Aug	15:00	KCH	South Korea	2–3	Vietnam	25–22	25–19	23–25	17–25	13–15	103–106	Report
30 Aug	18:00	MCC	Chinese Taipei	3–0	Uzbekistan	25–11	25–10	25–18			75–39	Report
31 Aug	18:00	KCH	South Korea	3–2	Chinese Taipei	25–13	25–22	23–25	22–25	15–8	110–93	Report
31 Aug	18:00	MCC	Vietnam	3–0	Uzbekistan	25–11	25–12	25–9			75–32	Report
1 Sep	15:00	KCH	Uzbekistan	0–3	South Korea	12–25	15–25	12–25			39–75	Report
1 Sep	15:00	MCC	Chinese Taipei	1–3	Vietnam	18–25	22–25	25–18	17–25		82–93	Report

=== Pool D ===
Pos	Team	Pld	W	L	Pts	SW	SL	SR	SPW	SPL	SPR	Qualification
1	China	3	3	0	9	9	0	MAX	225	128	1.758	Pool F
2	Kazakhstan	3	2	1	5	6	5	1.200	226	234	0.966	Pool F
3	Hong Kong	3	1	2	3	3	6	0.500	164	203	0.808	Pool H
4	Philippines	3	0	3	1	2	9	0.222	208	258	0.806	Pool H

Source: Women's Asian Senior Championship 2023

Date	Time	Venue		Score		Set 1	Set 2	Set 3	Set 4	Set 5	Total	Report
30 Aug	12:00	MCC	Hong Kong	0–3	China	12–25	15–25	6–25			33–75	Report
30 Aug	15:00	MCC	Kazakhstan	3–2	Philippines	25–21	17–25	24–26	27–25	15–6	108–103	Report
31 Aug	12:00	MCC	Kazakhstan	3–0	Hong Kong	25–16	25–23	25–17			75–56	Report
31 Aug	15:00	KCH	Philippines	0–3	China	15–25	20–25	17–25			52–75	Report
1 Sep	12:00	MCC	Hong Kong	3–0	Philippines	25–21	25–21	25–11			75–53	Report
1 Sep	18:00	MCC	China	3–0	Kazakhstan	25–12	25–21	25–10			75–43	Report

== Classification round ==
- All times are Indochina Time (UTC+07:00).
- The results and the points of the matches between the same teams that were already played during the preliminary round shall be taken into account for the classification round.

=== Pool E ===
Pos	Team	Pld	W	L	Pts	SW	SL	SR	SPW	SPL	SPR	Qualification
1	Thailand (H)	3	3	0	9	9	1	9.000	238	198	1.202	Semifinals
2	Vietnam	3	2	1	5	7	5	1.400	262	252	1.040	Semifinals
3	South Korea	3	1	2	4	5	6	0.833	244	232	1.052	5th–8th semifinals
4	Australia	3	0	3	0	0	9	0.000	154	226	0.681	5th–8th semifinals

Source: Women's Asian Senior Championship 2023
(H) Host

Date	Time	Venue		Score		Set 1	Set 2	Set 3	Set 4	Set 5	Total	Report
3 Sep	15:00	KCH	Thailand	3–0	South Korea	25–20	25–22	25–23			75–65	Report
3 Sep	18:00	KCH	Australia	0–3	Vietnam	15–25	15–25	21–25			51–75	Report
4 Sep	15:00	KCH	Australia	0–3	South Korea	24–26	13–25	14–25			51–76	Report
4 Sep	18:00	KCH	Thailand	3–1	Vietnam	23–25	25–14	25–19	25–23		98–81	Report

=== Pool F ===
Pos	Team	Pld	W	L	Pts	SW	SL	SR	SPW	SPL	SPR	Qualification
1	China	3	3	0	8	9	2	4.500	259	182	1.423	Semifinals
2	Japan	3	2	1	7	8	3	2.667	258	192	1.344	Semifinals
3	Kazakhstan	3	1	2	3	3	6	0.500	169	205	0.824	5th–8th semifinals
4	India	3	0	3	0	0	9	0.000	118	225	0.524	5th–8th semifinals

Source: Women's Asian Senior Championship 2023

Date	Time	Venue		Score		Set 1	Set 2	Set 3	Set 4	Set 5	Total	Report
3 Sep	12:00	KCH	India	0–3	China	9–25	10–25	12–25			31–75	Report
3 Sep	12:00	MCC	Japan	3–0	Kazakhstan	25–13	25–20	25–18			75–51	Report
4 Sep	12:00	KCH	Japan	2–3	China	25–23	20–25	25–19	24–26	14–16	108–109	Report
4 Sep	12:00	MCC	India	0–3	Kazakhstan	17–25	17–25	21–25			55–75	Report

=== Pool G ===
Pos	Team	Pld	W	L	Pts	SW	SL	SR	SPW	SPL	SPR	Qualification
1	Chinese Taipei	2	2	0	6	6	0	MAX	151	97	1.557	9th–12th semifinals
2	Mongolia	2	1	1	3	3	3	1.000	133	126	1.056	9th–12th semifinals
3	Uzbekistan	2	0	2	0	0	6	0.000	89	150	0.593	13th place match

Source: Women's Asian Senior Championship 2023

Date	Time	Venue		Score		Set 1	Set 2	Set 3	Set 4	Set 5	Total	Report
3 Sep	15:00	MCC	Mongolia	3–0	Uzbekistan	25–15	25–19	25–16			75–50	Report
4 Sep	15:00	MCC	Mongolia	0–3	Chinese Taipei	17–25	24–26	17–25			58–76	Report

=== Pool H ===
Pos	Team	Pld	W	L	Pts	SW	SL	SR	SPW	SPL	SPR	Qualification
1	Iran	2	2	0	4	6	4	1.500	215	191	1.126	9th–12th semifinals
2	Hong Kong	2	1	1	4	5	3	1.667	160	157	1.019	9th–12th semifinals
3	Philippines	2	0	2	1	2	6	0.333	159	186	0.855	13th place match

Source: Women's Asian Senior Championship 2023

Date	Time	Venue		Score		Set 1	Set 2	Set 3	Set 4	Set 5	Total	Report
3 Sep	18:00	MCC	Iran	3–2	Philippines	22–25	25–22	25–21	24–26	15–12	111–106	Report
4 Sep	18:00	MCC	Iran	3–2	Hong Kong	25–20	19–25	20–25	25–5	15–10	104–85	Report

== Final round ==
- All times are Indochina Time (UTC+07:00).

=== 13th place match ===
Date	Time	Venue		Score		Set 1	Set 2	Set 3	Set 4	Set 5	Total	Report
5 Sep	09:00	KCH	Uzbekistan	0–3	Philippines	20–25	17–25	23–25			60–75	Report

=== 9th–12th places ===
9th–12th semifinals
5 September
Chinese Taipei	3
Hong Kong	0
5 September
Mongolia	0
Iran	3

9th place match
6 September
Chinese Taipei	3
Iran	0
11th place match
6 September
Hong Kong	3
Mongolia	2

==== 9th–12th semifinals ====
Date	Time	Venue		Score		Set 1	Set 2	Set 3	Set 4	Set 5	Total	Report
5 Sep	15:00	MCC	Chinese Taipei	3–0	Hong Kong	25–11	25–20	25–19			75–50	Report
5 Sep	18:00	MCC	Mongolia	0–3	Iran	18–25	12–25	20–25			50–75	Report

==== 11th place match ====
Date	Time	Venue		Score		Set 1	Set 2	Set 3	Set 4	Set 5	Total	Report
6 Sep	13:00	MCC	Hong Kong	3–2	Mongolia	25–19	16–25	25–27	25–20	15–7	106–98	Report

==== 9th place match ====
Date	Time	Venue		Score		Set 1	Set 2	Set 3	Set 4	Set 5	Total	Report
6 Sep	16:00	MCC	Chinese Taipei	3–0	Iran	25–14	25–19	26–24			76–57	Report

=== 5th–8th places ===
5th–8th semifinals
5 September
South Korea	3
India	0
5 September
Australia	2
Kazakhstan	3

5th place match
6 September
South Korea	0
Kazakhstan	3
7th place match
6 September
India	3
Australia	2

==== 5th–8th semifinals ====
Date	Time	Venue		Score		Set 1	Set 2	Set 3	Set 4	Set 5	Total	Report
5 Sep	12:00	KCH	Australia	2–3	Kazakhstan	16–25	25–21	25–19	15–25	12–15	93–105	Report
5 Sep	12:00	MCC	South Korea	3–0	India	25–21	25–18	25–20			75–59	Report

==== 7th place match ====
Date	Time	Venue		Score		Set 1	Set 2	Set 3	Set 4	Set 5	Total	Report
6 Sep	10:00	MCC	India	3–2	Australia	21–25	28–26	25–23	20–25	15–10	109–109	Report

==== 5th place match ====
Date	Time	Venue		Score		Set 1	Set 2	Set 3	Set 4	Set 5	Total	Report
6 Sep	12:00	KCH	South Korea	0–3	Kazakhstan	24–26	23–25	23–25			70–76	Report

=== Final four ===
Semifinals
5 September
Thailand	3
Japan	2
5 September
Vietnam	0
China	3

Final
6 September
Thailand	3
China	2
3rd place match
6 September
Japan	3
Vietnam	2

==== Semifinals ====
Date	Time	Venue		Score		Set 1	Set 2	Set 3	Set 4	Set 5	Total	Report
5 Sep	15:00	KCH	Vietnam	0–3	China	13–25	12–25	22–25			47–75	Report
5 Sep	18:00	KCH	Thailand	3–2	Japan	25–23	19–25	20–25	25–20	15–11	104–104	Report

==== 3rd place match ====
Date	Time	Venue		Score		Set 1	Set 2	Set 3	Set 4	Set 5	Total	Report
6 Sep	15:00	KCH	Japan	3–2	Vietnam	21–25	25–14	25–22	20–25	15–11	106–97	Report

==== Final ====
Date	Time	Venue		Score		Set 1	Set 2	Set 3	Set 4	Set 5	Total	Report
6 Sep	18:00	KCH	Thailand	3–2	China	25–21	25–27	25–19	20–25	16–14	111–106	Report

== Final standing ==
Rank	Team
1st place, gold medalist(s)	Thailand
2nd place, silver medalist(s)	China
3rd place, bronze medalist(s)	Japan
4	Vietnam
5	Kazakhstan
6	South Korea
7	India
8	Australia
9	Chinese Taipei
10	Iran
11	Hong Kong
12	Mongolia
13	Philippines
14	Uzbekistan

Qualified for the 2025 World Championship
Qualified for the 2025 World Championship as hosts

2023 Asian Women's champions

Thailand
3rd title

14–woman roster
Wipawee Srithong, Piyanut Pannoy, Pornpun Guedpard, Thatdao Nuekjang, Hattaya Bamrungsuk, Pimpichaya Kokram, Sasipapron Janthawisut, Ajcharaporn Kongyot, Chatchu-on Moksri, Supattra Pairoj, Thanacha Sooksod, Sirima Manakij, Wimonrat Thanapan, Jarasporn Bundasak
Head coach
Danai Sriwatcharamethakul

== Awards ==
- Most valuable player
  Chatchu-on Moksri (THA)
- Best setter
  Pornpun Guedpard (THA)
- Best outside spikers
  Yuki Nishikawa (JPN)
  Wu Mengjie (CHN)
- Best middle blockers
  Thatdao Nuekjang (THA)
  Yang Hanyu (CHN)
- Best opposite spiker
  Zhou Yetong (CHN)
- Best libero
  Manami Kojima (JPN)

== See also ==
- 2023 Asian Men's Volleyball Championship
- 2023 Asian Women's Club Volleyball Championship
- 2023 Asian Women's Volleyball Challenge Cup
