= Macau women's national volleyball team =

National sports team

Macau
- Association: Macau Volleyball Federation
- Confederation: AVC
- FIVB ranking: 88 ▼10 (2 October 2026)

Uniforms
Home	Away

The Macau women's national volleyball team represents Macau in international women's volleyball competitions and friendly matches.

They qualified for the 1992 Asian Women's Volleyball Championship and the 1994 Asian Women's Volleyball Championship.
