= Central Asian Volleyball Association =

Zonal association of volleyball in Central Asia and South Asia

- Abbreviation: CAVA
- Formation: December 1993; 32 years ago
- Type: Volleyball organisation
- Headquarters: Malé, Maldives
- Region served: Central Asia and South Asia
- Members: 14 national federations
- Official languages: English
- President: Mohamed Latheef
- Parent organization: Asian Volleyball Confederation

The Central Asian Volleyball Association (CAVA) is one of five zonal associations of governance in volleyball within the Asian Volleyball Confederation (AVC). It governs indoor volleyball and beach volleyball in Central Asia and South Asia. CAVA was formed in 10th AVC General Assembly in 1993. CAVA consists of 14 national federation members which are full members with the Fédération Internationale de Volleyball (FIVB). All of them also represent the National Olympic Committees (NOCs) of their respective countries and dependent territories, allowing them to participate in the Olympic Games.

CAVA runs zonal championships including the CAVA Men's Volleyball Nations League and CAVA Women's Volleyball Nations League. Mohamed Latheef, former president of the Volleyball Association of Maldives, was elected as CAVA's president in Bangkok, in February 2024. His election also secured him the position of vice-president within the continental governing body, AVC.

== National federations ==
The Central Asian Volleyball Association has 14 national federations.

Code	Federation	National teams	Founded	FIVB affiliation	AVC affiliation	IOC member
AFG	Afghanistan	Men's; U23; U21; U19; U17; Women's; U23; U21; U19; U17				Yes
BAN	Bangladesh	Men's; U23; U21; U19; U17; Women's; U23; U21; U19; U17	1973			Yes
BHU	Bhutan	Men's; U23; U21; U19; U17; Women's; U23; U21; U19; U17				Yes
IND	India	Men's; U23; U21; U19; U17; Women's; U23; U21; U19; U17	1951			Yes
IRI	Iran	Men's; U23; U21; U19; U17; Women's; U23; U21; U19; U17	1945	1959		Yes
KAZ	Kazakhstan	Men's; U23; U21; U19; U17; Women's; U23; U21; U19; U17	1992			Yes
KGZ	Kyrgyzstan	Men's; U23; U21; U19; U17; Women's; U23; U21; U19; U17				Yes
MDV	Maldives	Men's; U23; U21; U19; U17; Women's; U23; U21; U19; U17				Yes
NEP	Nepal	Men's; U23; U21; U19; U17; Women's; U23; U21; U19; U17	1976			Yes
PAK	Pakistan	Men's; U23; U21; U19; U17; Women's; U23; U21; U19; U17	1955			Yes
SRI	Sri Lanka	Men's; U23; U21; U19; U17; Women's; U23; U21; U19; U17	1951			Yes
TJK	Tajikistan	Men's; U23; U21; U19; U17; Women's; U23; U21; U19; U17				Yes
TKM	Turkmenistan	Men's; U23; U21; U19; U17; Women's; U23; U21; U19; U17				Yes
UZB	Uzbekistan	Men's; U23; U21; U19; U17; Women's; U23; U21; U19; U17				Yes

== Competitions ==
National teams:
- CAVA Men's Volleyball Championship
- CAVA Women's Volleyball Championship
- CAVA Men's Volleyball Challenge Cup
- CAVA Women's Volleyball Challenge Cup
- Central Asian Men's U20 Volleyball Championship
- Central Asian Women's U20 Volleyball Championship
- Central Asian Men's U18 Volleyball Championship
- Central Asian Women's U18 Volleyball Championship

Beach volleyball:

- Central Asian Beach Volleyball Championships

Clubs:

- Central Asian Men's Volleyball Club Championship
- Central Asian Women's Volleyball Club Championship

== Current title holders ==
=== Indoor Volleyball ===
Competition	Champions	Runners-up	3rd place	Ref.
National teams (men)
CAVA Volleyball Championship (2026)	Pakistan	Bangladesh	Sri Lanka	
CAVA Cup (2025)	Turkmenistan	Afghanistan	Sri Lanka	
CAVA U20 Volleyball Championship (2024)	Uzbekistan	Nepal	Turkmenistan	
CAVA U18 Volleyball Championship (2024)	Pakistan	Iran	Kazakhstan	
National teams (women)
CAVA Volleyball Championship (2026)	Iran	Kazakhstan	India	
CAVA Cup (2025)	Kyrgyzstan	Maldives	Bangladesh	
CAVA U20 Volleyball Championship (2024)	Kyrgyzstan	Sri Lanka	Nepal	
CAVA U18 Volleyball Championship (2024)	Iran	Kazakhstan	Uzbekistan	
Club teams (men)
CAVA Club Volleyball Championship (2024)	(India) Calicut Heroes	Help Nepal Sports Club	Iran Club	
Club teams (women)
CAVA Club Volleyball Championship (2024)	(Nepal) NPC V.C.	(Uzbekistan) Humo V.C.	(Maldives) Wamco V.C.	

=== Beach volleyball ===
Competition	Champions	Runners-up	3rd place	Ref.
National teams (men)
CAVA Beach Volleyball Championships (2024)	Maldives; Naseem Adam; Ismail Sajid	Nepal; Man Bahadur Shrestha; Dil Bahadur Sunar	Tajikistan; Ismoilov Fakhridin; Davlatmamadov Raim	
National teams (women)
CAVA Beach Volleyball Championships (2024)	Nepal; Kamala Pun; Manisha Chaudhary	Uzbekistan; Jalolova Mukhlisakhon; Olimova Malikabonu	Uzbekistan; Askarova Zamigora; Nurmatova Dinorakhon	

== Events ==
=== 2024 ===
1. 1st U16 Boys and Girls - UZB
2. 1st U18 Boys and Girls - UZB

=== 2025 ===
==== Beach ====
1. CAVA Beach Volleyball Championships (Men / Women) Sri Lanka Jan
2. Beach U21 (Men / Women) Maldives June
3. Beach Challenge Cup (Men / Women) Bhutan July
4. Beach Nations League (Men / Women) Maldives
5. Beach Clubs (Men / Women) Maldives

==== Indoor ====
1. U16 Men Uzbekistan June (2nd)
2. U19 Men Uzbekistan June (2nd)
3. U16 Women Tajikistan July
4. Champions League Men Clubs Maldives July
5. Nations League Men August
6. Nations Cup Women Maldives September
7. Nations Cup Men Bangladesh October
8. Nations League Women Nepal October
9. U19 Women Sri Lanka November
10. CISM Uzbekistan November
11. FISU Uzbekistan November
12. Champions League Women Clubs Nepal December

== See also ==
- Eastern Asian Volleyball Association
- Oceania Zonal Volleyball Association
- Southeast Asian Volleyball Association
- West Asian Volleyball Association
