= Philippines women's national under-19 volleyball team =

Philippines Under-19
- Nickname(s): Alas Pilipinas (lit. 'Philippine Aces')
- Association: Philippine National Volleyball Federation
- Confederation: AVC
- Head coach: (Philippines) Ray Karl Dimaculangan

Uniforms
Home	Away	Third

Youth Olympic Games
- Appearances: None

FIVB U19 World Championship
- Appearances: None

AVC U18 Asian Championship
- Appearances: 8 (First in 1997)
- Best result: 7th (2014)
Honours
Girls U18 Southeast Asian Championship
Bronze medal – third place	2024 Nakhon Pathom	Team
Bronze medal – third place	2026 Nakhon Ratchasima	Team

The Philippines women's national under-19 volleyball team represents the Philippines in women's under-18/19 volleyball events. It is controlled and managed by the Philippine National Volleyball Federation (PNVF), which is a member of the Asian volleyball body Asian Volleyball Confederation (AVC) and the international volleyball body government the Fédération Internationale de Volleyball (FIVB).

== Team image ==
=== Names ===
Nicknames
Nickname	In use
Alas Pilipinas Girls	2024–present

The Philippine women's national under-19 team is known by their moniker "Alas Pilipinas", with Alas meaning "Ace" in Filipino. The nickname is an official designation by the Philippine National Volleyball Federation in partnership with sponsor Cignal TV. Adopted on May 15, 2024, the moniker is shared with all national indoor and beach volleyball teams of the Philippines, including the youth teams.

== Rankings ==
This is the current ranking of the under-19 volleyball team of the Philippines in FIVB World Rankings.

FIVB Girls' U19 Ranking as of 24 August 2023
Rank	Team	Points	Confederation
34 ▲	Philippines	3	AVC
42 ▼	Romania	2	CEV
42 ▼	Slovakia	2	CEV

== Current roster ==
Philippine National U18 Volleyball Team for SAVA Princess Cup Volleyball Girls U18 Southeast Asian Championship
Position	Name	Date of birth	Height	Current team
OH	Ellaine Gonzalvo	December 9, 2009 (age 16)	1.70 m (5 ft 7 in)	(Philippines) Adamson University High School
OH	Slash Nicole Obera	November 29, 2009 (age 16)	1.70 m (5 ft 7 in)	(Philippines) NU - Nazareth School
OH	Xyz Ellen Rayco	November 3, 2011 (age 14)	1.77 m (5 ft 10 in)	(Philippines) NU - Nazareth School
OH	Venus Anne De Guia	January 15, 2013 (age 13)	1.63 m (5 ft 4 in)	(Philippines) NU - Nazareth School
OH	Maria Ysabelle Tuballas	November 27, 2009 (age 16)	1.80 m (5 ft 11 in)	(Philippines) NU - Nazareth School
MB	Princess Khaira Manzano	May 8, 2010 (age 16)	1.78 m (5 ft 10 in)	(Philippines) NU - Nazareth School
MB	Ysabelle Patricia Cruz	October 12, 2009 (age 17)	1.8 m (5 ft 11 in)	(Philippines) NU - Nazareth School
MB	Adeleine Terese Agustin	July 14, 2009 (age 17)	1.82 m (6 ft 0 in)	(Philippines) NU - Nazareth School
OP	Jhaynna Love Bulandres	April 9, 2011 (age 15)	1.75 m (5 ft 9 in)	(Philippines) NU - Nazareth School
OP	Sharina Rhyza Lleses	October 27, 2011 (age 14)	1.72 m (5 ft 8 in)	(Philippines) King's Montessori School
S	Micaella Gould	July 1, 2009 (age 17)	1.70 m (5 ft 7 in)	(Philippines) NU - Nazareth School
S	Irish May Mahinay	June 11, 2010 (age 16)	1.71 m (5 ft 7 in)	(Philippines) NU - Nazareth School
L	Ghenievib Belen	September 5, 2009 (age 17)	1.60 m (5 ft 3 in)	(Philippines) NU - Nazareth School
L	Frances Dianne Ramos	April 30, 2011 (age 15)	1.59 m (5 ft 3 in)	(Philippines) NU - Nazareth School

The following persons were assigned by the Philippine National Volleyball Federation as part of the coaching staff.

Coaching Staff
Position	Name
Head coach	(Philippines) Ray Karl Dimaculangan
Assistant coach 1	(Philippines) Keenan Quitco
Assistant coach 2	(Philippines) Marco Ely Maclan
Team manager	(Philippines) Carmela Gamboa
Physical therapist	(Philippines) Hannah De Luna

=== Starting Rotation ===
The following is the rotation of the starting roster of the women's national u18 team.

Philippines Women's National U18 Team

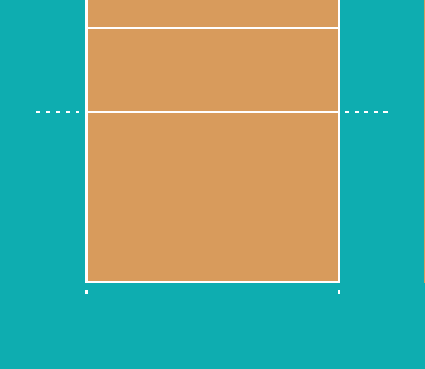

== Previous squads ==
Asian Girls' U18 Volleyball Championship

=== 2024 Asian Girls' U18 Volleyball Championship ===
Philippines (2024 Asian Girls' U18 Volleyball Championship)

Philippine National U-18 Volleyball Team for 2024 Asian Girls' U18 Volleyball Championship
Position	Name	Date of birth	Height	Current team
OH	Denesse Daylisan	September 7, 2007 (age 19)	1.69 m (5 ft 7 in)	(Philippines) NUNS Lady Bullpups
OH	Akeyla Bartolabac	April 14, 2007 (age 19)	1.70 m (5 ft 7 in)	(Philippines) NUNS Lady Bullpups
OH	Samarah Gillian Marzan	October 23, 2007 (age 19)	1.73 m (5 ft 8 in)	(Philippines) DLSZ Junior Lady Archers
OP	Harlyn Serneche (c)	June 13, 2007 (age 19)	1.74 m (5 ft 9 in)	(Philippines) NUNS Lady Bullpups
OP	Jaila Adrao	June 8, 2008 (age 18)	1.75 m (5 ft 9 in)	(Philippines) UST Junior Tigresses
MB	Lianne Penuliar	March 17, 2007 (age 19)	1.74 m (5 ft 9 in)	(Philippines) UST Junior Tigresses
MB	Avril Bron	May 2, 2007 (age 19)	1.72 m (5 ft 8 in)	(Philippines) UST Junior Tigresses
MB	Ashley Macalinao	October 3, 2007 (age 19)	1.90 m (6 ft 3 in)	(Philippines) Kings' Montessori School Lady Vikings
S	Maile Paz Salang	February 16, 2007 (age 19)	1.69 m (5 ft 7 in)	(Philippines) UST Junior Tigresses
S	Aneeza Santos	May 22, 2008 (age 18)	1.81 m (5 ft 11 in)	(Philippines) UST Junior Tigresses
L	Ghenievib Belen	September 5, 2009 (age 17)	1.60 m (5 ft 3 in)	(Philippines) NUNS Lady Bullpups
L	Chasliey Naomi Pepito	May 27, 2009 (age 17)	1.52 m (5 ft 0 in)	(Philippines) UST Junior Tigresses

The following persons were assigned by the Philippine National Volleyball Federation as part of the coaching staff.

Coaching Staff
Position	Name
Head coach	(Japan) Takayuki Minowa
Assistant coach 1	(Philippines) Ray Karl Dimaculangan
Assistant coach 2	(Philippines) Villet Ponce De Leon
Therapist	(Philippines) Juan Miguel Dizon
Team manager	(Philippines) Mozzy Ravena

=== 2022 Asian Girls' U18 Volleyball Championship ===
Philippines (2022 Asian Girls' U18 Volleyball Championship)

Philippine National U-18 Volleyball Team for 2022 Asian Girls' U18 Volleyball Championship
No.	Position	Name	Date of birth	Height	Current team
1	MB	Rhose Vlane Almendralejo	January 25, 2009 (age 17)	1.73 m (5 ft 8 in)	Bacolod Tay Tung High School
2	S	Jan Rose Bulak	January 26, 2008 (age 18)	1.56 m (5 ft 1 in)	Bacolod Tay Tung High School
3	OH	Zachea Venize Maganto	March 11, 2007 (age 19)	1.74 m (5 ft 9 in)	Bacolod Tay Tung High School
4	S	Katherine Shaine Cortez	June 2, 2005 (age 21)	1.65 m (5 ft 5 in)	Bacolod Tay Tung High School
6	MB	Lana Chloe Madrigal	August 16, 2007 (age 19)	1.66 m (5 ft 5 in)	Bacolod Tay Tung High School
7	OP	Jothea Mae Ramos	November 3, 2006 (age 19)	1.70 m (5 ft 7 in)	Bacolod Tay Tung High School
9	OH	Camila Amor Bartolome	March 29, 2007 (age 19)	1.73 m (5 ft 8 in)	Bacolod Tay Tung High School
10	OH	Ana Frasessa Hermosura (c)	June 16, 2006 (age 20)	1.66 m (5 ft 5 in)	Bacolod Tay Tung High School
12	MB	Dona Mae De Leon	December 10, 2006 (age 19)	1.73 m (5 ft 8 in)	Bacolod Tay Tung High School
14	L	Mary Karylle Suplico	June 4, 2006 (age 20)	1.54 m (5 ft 1 in)	Bacolod Tay Tung High School
15	OH	Kimberly Chelmei Rubin	July 20, 2007 (age 19)	1.66 m (5 ft 5 in)	Bacolod Tay Tung High School
16	OP	Joenil Ann Ramos	September 2, 2007 (age 19)	1.67 m (5 ft 6 in)	Bacolod Tay Tung High School

The following persons were assigned by the Philippine National Volleyball Federation as part of the coaching staff.

Coaching Staff
Position	Name
Head coach	(Philippines) Jerry L. Yee
Assistant coach 1	(Philippines) Ian M. Macariola
Assistant coach 2	(Philippines) Roberto M. Calamba Jr.
Trainer	(Philippines) Miguel Alexander D. Guevarra
Team Manager	(Philippines) Jose G. Montalbo

=== 2014 Asian Youth Girls Volleyball Championship ===
Philippines (2014 Asian Youth Girls Volleyball Championship)

Roster:

No.	Position	Name	Date of birth	School
1	Opposite Hitter	Ezra Gyra Barroga	30 August 1998	University of Santo Tomas
3	Setter	Rica Diolan (c)	15 August 1998	NU Nazareth School
4	Outside Hitter	Justine Dorog	13 March 1998	Hope Christian High School
5	Middle Blocker	Christine Dianne Francisco	24 July 1998	University of Santo Tomas
7	Outside Hitter	Ejiya Laure	21 March 1999	University of Santo Tomas
8	Middle Blocker	Maristela Genn Layug	3 November 1998	Kings' Montessori School
9	Libero	Kristine Magallanes	16 May 1998	NU Nazareth School
10	Middle Blocker	Nicole Anne Magsarile	8 March 2000	NU Nazareth School
12	Outside Hitter	Maria Lina Isabel Molde	18 October 1998	Hope Christian High School
13	Opposite Hitter	Jasmine Nabor	11 July 1998	NU Nazareth School
14	Middle Blocker	Faith Janine Shirley Nisperos	2 January 2000	NU Nazareth School
15	Outside Hitter	Roselyn Rosier	10 September 1998	Brent International School
17	Middle Blocker	Alyssa Marie Teope	23 November 1998	University of Santo Tomas
18	Libero	Caitlin Viray	12 April 1998	University of Santo Tomas

- Head coach:
  (Philippines) Jerry Yee
- Assistant coaches:
  (Philippines) Emilio Reyes Jr.
  (Philippines) Francis Vicente
- Team Manager:
  (Philippines) Mariano See T. Diet

Women's U18 South East Asian Volleyball Championship (Princess Cup)

=== 2026 Women's U18 South East Asian Volleyball Championship ===
Philippines (2026 Women's U18 South East Asian Volleyball Championship)

Philippine National U18 Volleyball Team for SAVA Princess Cup Volleyball Girls U18 Southeast Asian Championship
Position	Name	Date of birth	Height	Current team
OH	Ellaine Gonzalvo	December 9, 2009 (age 16)	1.70 m (5 ft 7 in)	(Philippines) Adamson University High School
OH	Slash Nicole Obera	November 29, 2009 (age 16)	1.70 m (5 ft 7 in)	(Philippines) NU - Nazareth School
OH	Xyz Ellen Rayco	November 3, 2011 (age 14)	1.77 m (5 ft 10 in)	(Philippines) NU - Nazareth School
OH	Venus Anne De Guia	January 15, 2013 (age 13)	1.63 m (5 ft 4 in)	(Philippines) NU - Nazareth School
OH	Maria Ysabelle Tuballas	November 27, 2009 (age 16)	1.80 m (5 ft 11 in)	(Philippines) NU - Nazareth School
MB	Princess Khaira Manzano	May 8, 2010 (age 16)	1.78 m (5 ft 10 in)	(Philippines) NU - Nazareth School
MB	Ysabelle Patricia Cruz	October 12, 2009 (age 17)	1.8 m (5 ft 11 in)	(Philippines) NU - Nazareth School
MB	Adeleine Terese Agustin	July 14, 2009 (age 17)	1.82 m (6 ft 0 in)	(Philippines) NU - Nazareth School
OP	Jhaynna Love Bulandres	April 9, 2011 (age 15)	1.75 m (5 ft 9 in)	(Philippines) NU - Nazareth School
OP	Sharina Rhyza Lleses	October 27, 2011 (age 14)	1.72 m (5 ft 8 in)	(Philippines) King's Montessori School
S	Micaella Gould	July 1, 2009 (age 17)	1.70 m (5 ft 7 in)	(Philippines) NU - Nazareth School
S	Irish May Mahinay	June 11, 2010 (age 16)	1.71 m (5 ft 7 in)	(Philippines) NU - Nazareth School
L	Ghenievib Belen	September 5, 2009 (age 17)	1.60 m (5 ft 3 in)	(Philippines) NUNS Lady Bullpups
L	Frances Dianne Ramos	April 30, 2011 (age 15)	1.59 m (5 ft 3 in)	(Philippines) NU - Nazareth School

The following persons were assigned by the Philippine National Volleyball Federation as part of the coaching staff.

Coaching Staff
Position	Name
Head coach	(Philippines) Ray Karl Dimaculangan
Assistant coach 1	(Philippines) Keenan Quitco
Assistant coach 2	(Philippines) Marco Ely Maclan
Team manager	(Philippines) Carmela Gamboa
Physical therapist	(Philippines) Hannah De Luna

=== 2024 Women's U18 South East Asian Volleyball Championship ===
Philippines (2024 Women's U18 South East Asian Volleyball Championship)

Philippine National U-18 Volleyball Team for 2024 Women's U18 South East Asian Volleyball Championship
Position	Name	Date of birth	Height	Current team
OH	Denesse Daylisan	September 7, 2007 (age 19)	1.69 m (5 ft 7 in)	(Philippines) NUNS Lady Bullpups
OH	Kimberly Rubin	July 20, 2007 (age 19)	1.66 m (5 ft 5 in)	(Philippines) UST Junior Tigresses
OH	Akeyla Bartolabac	April 14, 2007 (age 19)	1.70 m (5 ft 7 in)	(Philippines) NUNS Lady Bullpups
OP	Harlyn Serneche (c)	June 13, 2007 (age 19)	1.74 m (5 ft 9 in)	(Philippines) NUNS Lady Bullpups
OP	Jaila Adrao	June 8, 2008 (age 18)	1.75 m (5 ft 9 in)	(Philippines) UST Junior Tigresses
MB	Lianne Penuliar	March 17, 2007 (age 19)	1.74 m (5 ft 9 in)	(Philippines) UST Junior Tigresses
MB	Avril Bron	May 2, 2007 (age 19)	1.72 m (5 ft 8 in)	(Philippines) UST Junior Tigresses
MB	Ashley Macalinao	October 3, 2007 (age 19)	1.90 m (6 ft 3 in)	(Philippines) Kings' Montessori School Lady Vikings
S	Maile Paz Salang	February 16, 2007 (age 19)	1.69 m (5 ft 7 in)	(Philippines) UST Junior Tigresses
S	Aneeza Santos	May 22, 2008 (age 18)	1.81 m (5 ft 11 in)	(Philippines) UST Junior Tigresses
L	Ghenievib Belen	September 5, 2009 (age 17)	1.60 m (5 ft 3 in)	(Philippines) NUNS Lady Bullpups
L	Chasliey Naomi Pepito	May 27, 2009 (age 17)	1.52 m (5 ft 0 in)	(Philippines) UST Junior Tigresses

The following persons were assigned by the Philippine National Volleyball Federation as part of the coaching staff.

Coaching Staff
Position	Name
Head coach	(Japan) Takayuki Minowa
Assistant coach 1	(Philippines) Ray Karl Dimaculangan
Assistant coach 2	(Philippines) Villet Ponce De Leon
Therapist	(Philippines) Juan Miguel Dizon
Team manager	(Philippines) Mozzy Ravena

=== 2016 Women's U18 South East Asian Volleyball Championship ===
Philippines (2016 Women's U18 South East Asian Volleyball Championship)

No.	Name	Date of birth	Height	Weight	Spike	Block	2016 club
1	Isabelle Camama	9 June 1998	1.77 m (5 ft 10 in)	70 kg (150 lb)	263 cm (104 in)	264 cm (104 in)	(Philippines) University of the East
2	Jeanette Virginia Villareal	21 July 1998	1.75 m (5 ft 9 in)	59 kg (130 lb)	260 cm (100 in)	262 cm (103 in)	(Philippines) Far Eastern University
3	Mary Anne Mendrez	14 November 1998	1.75 m (5 ft 9 in)	59 kg (130 lb)	260 cm (100 in)	261 cm (103 in)	(Philippines) University of the East
4	Kath Arado (L)	22 May 1998	1.57 m (5 ft 2 in)	50 kg (110 lb)	240 cm (94 in)	240 cm (94 in)	(Philippines) University of the East
6	Seth Marione Rodriguez	22 September 1998	1.77 m (5 ft 10 in)	62 kg (137 lb)	261 cm (103 in)	262 cm (103 in)	(Philippines) University of the East
7	Dianne Latayan	21 April 1998	1.70 m (5 ft 7 in)	59 kg (130 lb)	259 cm (102 in)	260 cm (100 in)	(Philippines) Mapua Institute of Technology
8	Rica Diolan (C)	15 August 1998	1.67 m (5 ft 6 in)	55 kg (121 lb)	254 cm (100 in)	253 cm (100 in)	(Philippines) De La Salle - College of Saint Benilde
9	Jasmine Nabor	11 July 1998	1.70 m (5 ft 7 in)	50 kg (110 lb)	262 cm (103 in)	264 cm (104 in)	(Philippines) National University
10	Mariella Gabarda	13 June 1998	1.75 m (5 ft 9 in)	48 kg (106 lb)	262 cm (103 in)	265 cm (104 in)	(Philippines) University of the East
12	Ria Beatriz Glenell Duremdes	7 June 1998	1.57 m (5 ft 2 in)	47 kg (104 lb)	238 cm (94 in)	237 cm (93 in)	(Philippines) Far Eastern University
13	Trisha Mae Genesis	20 March 2000	1.70 m (5 ft 7 in)	55 kg (121 lb)	260 cm (100 in)	262 cm (103 in)	(Philippines) Holy Rosary College
14	Zilfa Olarve	2 March 1998	1.72 m (5 ft 8 in)	65 kg (143 lb)	263 cm (104 in)	264 cm (104 in)	(Philippines) Holy Rosary College

Coaching staff

- Head coach:
  (Philippines) Francis Vicente
- Assistant coach(s):
  (Philippines) Lerma Giron
  (Philippines) Naela Orozco

Team staff

- Team Manager:
  (Philippines) Marissa Andres

Medical staff

- Physical Therapist/Trainer:
  (Philippines) Christian Santos

== Competition record ==
=== Girls' Asian U18 Volleyball Championship ===
Asian U18 Championship record
Year	Round	Position	Pld	W	L	SW	SL	Squad
(Thailand) 1997	Round Robin	8th place	7	0	7	1	21	No info
(Singapore) 1999	Classification Round	8th place	5	0	5	0	15	No info
(Thailand) 2001	did not participate							
(Thailand) 2003	Round Robin	8th place	7	0	7	0	21	No info
(Philippines) 2005	Classification Round	8th place	6	0	6	0	18	No info
(Thailand) 2007	did not participate							
(Philippines) 2008	Classification Round	8th place	6	1	5	3	15	No info
(Malaysia) 2010	did not participate							
(China) 2012	did not participate							
(Thailand) 2014	Classification Round	7th place	8	4	4	14	16	Squad
(China) 2017	did not participate							
(Thailand) 2018	did not participate							
(Thailand) 2022	Classification Round	9th place	7	2	5	7	15	Squad
(Thailand) 2024	Classification Round	10th place	4	1	3	3	13	Squad
(Thailand) 2026	Qualified							
Total	0 Title(s)		50	8	42	28	134	—

=== Asian Youth Games ===
Asian Youth Games record
Year	Round	Position	Pld	W	L	SW	SL	Squad
(Bahrain) 2025	Semifinals	4th place	7	4	3	13	12	No info
Total	0 Title(s)		7	4	3	13	12	—

=== Women's U18 South East Asian Volleyball Championship (Princess Cup) ===
U18 South East Asian Championship record
Year	Round	Position	Pld	W	L	SW	SL	Squad
(Thailand) 2016	Semifinal Round	4th place	5	2	3	6	10	Squad
(Thailand) 2018	did not participate							
(Thailand) 2024	Semifinal Round	3rd place	6	4	2	12	8	Squad
(Thailand) 2026	Semifinal Round	3rd place	5	3	2	9	8	Squad
Total	0 Title(s)		16	9	7	27	26	—

== Coaches ==
- (Philippines) Jerry Yee (2014; 2022)
- (Philippines) Francis Vicente (2016)
- (Japan) Takayuki Minowa (2024–2026)
- (Philippines) Ray Karl Dimaculangan (2026-)

== Notable players ==
- Kath Arado – Best Libero (2016 South East Asian Junior Women's Volleyball Championships); senior national team member (2019–2021).
- Jasmine Nabor – senior national team member (2019).
- Eya Laure – senior national team member (2019–present).
- Faith Nisperos – senior national team member (2021–2024).
- Lianne Penuliar – Best Middle Blocker (2024 Women's U18 Southeast Asian Volleyball Championship)
- Ellaine Gonzalvo – Best Outside Hitter (2026 Women's U18 Southeast Asian Volleyball Championship)

== See also ==
- Women's
  - Philippines women's national volleyball team
  - Philippines women's national under-23 volleyball team
  - Philippines women's national under-21 volleyball team
  - Philippines women's national under-17 volleyball team
  - Philippines women's national beach volleyball team
- Men's
  - Philippines men's national volleyball team
  - Philippines men's national under-23 volleyball team
  - Philippines men's national under-19 volleyball team
  - Philippines men's national beach volleyball team
- Volleyball in the Philippines
