= Volleyball in Nepal =

- Country: Nepal
- Governing body: Nepal Volleyball Association
- National teams: Men; Women
- First played: 1942, Trichandra College (Nepal)

Club competitions
- List: Leagues: Mens; National Volleyball Championship; PM Cup NVA Volleyball League (1st Division); NVA Club Volleyball Championship (Qualification); Nepal Volleyball League (franchise league); Women's; PM Cup NVA Volleyball League (1st Division); NVA Club Volleyball Championship (Qualification); Everest Women's Volleyball League (franchise league)

Audience records
- Season: NVL

Volleyball is one of the most popular sports in Nepal with both male and female participants of all age. Volleyball is played all over Nepal, both in villages as well as City/Urban Nepal. Almost all high schools and colleges in Nepal have male volleyball teams, and most regions of the country have developmental programs for girls of all ages as well.

Despite being played nationwide, volleyball's progress in Nepal has been minimal since it became the national sport three years ago. Over eight decades, Nepal has won just one gold, one silver, and four bronze international medals, mainly thanks to the women's team. The origins of volleyball in Nepal remain a mystery.

== History ==
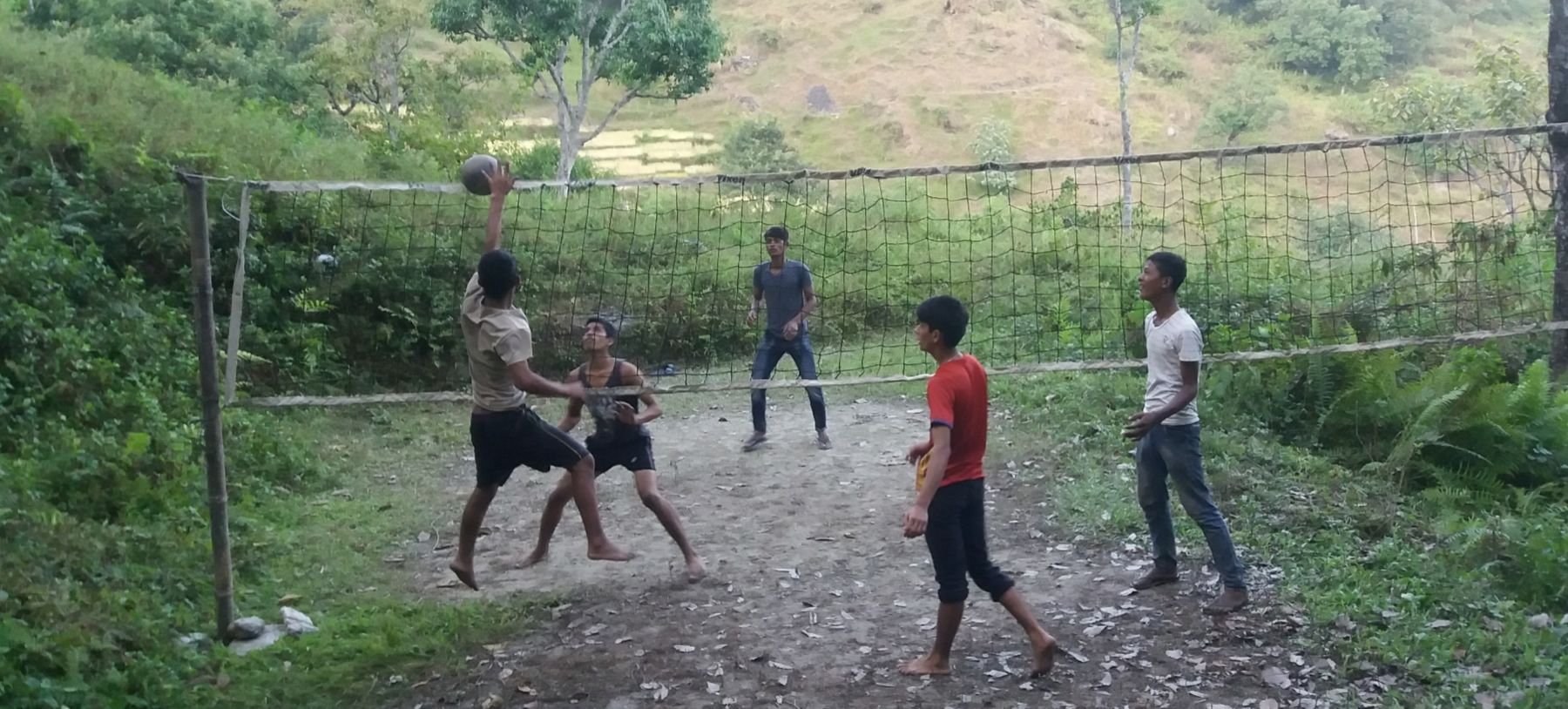
Boys Playing Volleyball in Village

Volleyball arrived in Nepal in 1933/4 with Nepalis who had served in the British Army and gained traction with Tri-Chandra College students in 1942. Despite early efforts by the Nepal Volleyball Association and the National Sports Council (NSC), significant progress only began after the 1990s.

The first National Volleyball Competition in Kathmandu in 1973 spurred public interest and the establishment of the National Volleyball Association in 1974. Nepal's international participation started in 1976, with key events preparing the team for the 1978 Asian Games. These experiences were crucial for Nepal's volleyball development, with notable recognition of players like Dipak Sapkota among Asia's best.

It took four decades for Nepal to register its first international win with a bronze medal in volleyball. In 2017, the men's team placed third in the Asian Central Zone Senior Men's Volleyball Championship. The women's team made history by winning the first Asian Senior Women Central Zone Volleyball Championship in 2019, without losing a single set. Despite their bronze medal in the 13th South Asian Games, the dream of winning on home ground remained unfulfilled.

== National teams ==
=== Men ===
- Nepal men's national volleyball team
- Nepal men's national under-20 volleyball team
- Nepal men's national under-18 volleyball team

=== Women ===
- Nepal women's national volleyball team
- Nepal women's national under-20 volleyball team
- Nepal women's national under-18 volleyball team

== Major Local Tournaments ==
- Tiger Volleyball club Championship, Pokhara
- Dhorpatan Volleyball League
- Lamachaur Cup Volleyball Tournament

== Major Local Tournaments ==
- Nepal Volleyball League
- Everest Women's Volleyball League

== See also ==
- Sports in Nepal
