= 2024–25 Prime Minister Cup NVA Women's Volleyball League =

Season of Nepalese women's professional volleyball

- Association: Nepal Volleyball Association
- League: Prime Minister Cup NVA Volleyball League
- Sport: Indoor Volleyball
- Duration: 1 Jun – 8 Jun 2024
- Matches: 17 (Regular seasons)
- Teams: 6
- Streaming partner: Hamro Khelkud (youtube)

Finals
- Champions: Nepal Police (2nd title)
- Runners-up: Everest V.C.

Seasons
- ← 2023–24 2025 →

The 2024–25 Prime Minister Cup NVA Women's Volleyball League is the 8th season of the Prime Minister Cup NVA Volleyball League, the top Nepalese professional league for women's volleyball clubs. The PM Cup, was established in 2013 and is also known as RBB PM Cup NVA Volleyball League due to the sponsorship deal with Rastriya Banijya Bank. A total of six teams will compete in the league. The season began on 1 June 2024 and is scheduled to conclude on 8 June 2024.

== Venue ==
- Dasarath Stadium covered Hall, Tripureshwar

== Teams ==
Top 6 team of the NVA Club Volleyball Championship (which is the qualification for this tournament) participated.

=== Personnel and kits ===
Team	Manager	Head Coach	Captain	Kit Manufacturer	Shirt Sponsors
APF Club	Ranjana Khadka	(Nepal) Mahesh Chaudhary	(Nepal) Binita Budathoki	Kelme	
Nepal Army	Chandra Bashnet	(Nepal) Bharat Bhandari	(Nepal) Sunita Khadka	Kelme	
Nepal Police	Shrawan Kumar Jha	(Nepal) Rupesh Kumar Bista	(Nepal) Kamala Pun	Kelme	
New Diamond V.C.	Buddhi Pd. Bhattarai	(Nepal) Kumar Rai	(Nepal) Prathiba Mali	Kelme	
Karnali Province		(Nepal) Motiram Nepali	(Nepal)		
Everest V.C.		(Nepal) Arjun Ghimire	(Nepal) Aruna Shahi		

== League standings ==
Win by 3–0 margin: 3 Points
Win by any other margin: 2 Points
Loss: 0 Points

If the teams are level on points, the number of sets won will be taken into consideration. The top two teams at the end of the league stage will move into the finals.

Pos	Team	Pld	W	L	Pts	SW	SL	SR	SPW	SPL	SPR	Qualification
1	Everest V.C.	5	5	0	13	15	3	5.000	425	326	1.304	Qualified for Final
2	Nepal Police	5	5	0	11	15	4	3.750	449	386	1.163	Qualified for Final
3	APF Club	5	3	2	9	11	8	1.375	420	337	1.246	Qualified for Third Place
4	Nepal Army	5	2	3	6	8	11	0.727	389	393	0.990	Qualified for Third Place
5	New Diamond V.C.	5	1	4	6	9	12	0.750	424	440	0.964	
6	Karnali Province	5	0	5	0	0	15	0.000	155	375	0.413	

Updated to match(es) played on 4 October 2024. Source:

== League stage ==
Date	Time		Score		Set 1	Set 2	Set 3	Set 4	Set 5	Total	Report
1 Jun	15:00	APF Club	3–2	New Diamond V.C.	25–23	23–25	20–25	25–15	15–3	108–91	
1 Jun	17:00	Nepal Police	3–2	Nepal Army	26–24	25–22	23–25	22–25	15–8	111–104	
2 Jun	8:00	Everest V.C.	3–0	Karnali Province	25–16	25–8	25–10			75–34	
2 Jun	10:00	Nepal Police	3–1	New Diamond V.C.	19–25	25–22	25–22	29–27		98–96	
3 Jun	8:00	APF Club	3–0	Karnali Province	25–7	25–7	25–9			75–23	
3 Jun	10:00	Everest V.C.	3–0	Nepal Army	25–15	25–19	25–19			75–53	
4 Jun	16:00	Everest V.C.	3–0	New Diamond V.C.	25–21	25–19	25–18			75–58	
4 Jun	18:00	Nepal Police	3–0	APF Club	25–21	25–17	30–28			80–66	
4 Jun	20:00	Nepal Army	3–0	Karnali Province	25–13	25–8	25–7			75–28	
5 Jun	8:00	Nepal Police	3–0	Karnali Province	25–7	25–6	25–8			75–21	
5 Jun	10:00	New Diamond V.C.	2–3	Nepal Army	27–25	25–20	17–25	23–25	12–15	104–110	
6 Jun	8:00	New Diamond V.C.	3–0	Karnali Province	25–11	25–16	25–22			75–49	
6 Jun	10:00	Everest V.C.	3–2	APF Club	23–25	13–25	25–17	25–21	15–8	101–96	
7 Jun	8:00	APF Club	3–0	Nepal Army	25–19	25–10	25–18			75–47	
7 Jun	10:00	Everest V.C.	3–1	Nepal Police	25–20	24–26	25–20	25–19		99–85	

== Final Stage ==
=== Third Place Match ===
Date	Time		Score		Set 1	Set 2	Set 3	Set 4	Set 5	Total	Report
8 Jun	8:00	APF Club	3-0	Nepal Army	25–19	25–20	25–19			75–58	

=== Final ===
Date	Time		Score		Set 1	Set 2	Set 3	Set 4	Set 5	Total	Report
8 Jun	13:00	Everest V.C.	2-3	Nepal Police	21–25	23–25	25–20	25–20	12–15	106–105	

== Final standing ==
Rank	Team
1st place, gold medalist(s)	Nepal Police
2nd place, silver medalist(s)	Everest V.C.
3rd place, bronze medalist(s)	APF Club
4	Nepal Army
5	New Diamond V.C.
6	Karnali Province

Qualified for the 2024 CAVA Women's Club Championship

== Awards ==
=== Player of the Match ===
Match No.	Player of the Match	
Match No.	Player	Club
1	(Nepal) Saraswoti Chaudhary	APF Club
2	(Nepal) Usha Bhandari	Nepal Police
3	(India) Soorya S	Everest V.C.
4	(Nepal) Kamala Pun	Nepal Police
5	(Nepal) Niruta Thagunna	APF Club
6	(India) KP Anushree	Everest V.C.
7	(Nepal) Aruna Shahi	Everest V.C.
8	(Nepal) Kamana Bista	Nepal Police
9	(Nepal) Aarati Subedi	Nepal Army
10	(Nepal) Kopila Rana	Nepal Police
11	(Nepal) Sangam Mahato	Nepal Army
12	(Nepal)	New Diamond V.C.
13	(India) Soorya S (2)	Everest V.C.
14	(Nepal)	APF Club
15	(India) KP Anushree (2)	Everest V.C.
16	(Nepal) Yamuna Rasaily	APF Club
17	Usha Bhandari	Nepal Police
