= List of presidents of the Asian Volleyball Confederation =

President of AVC
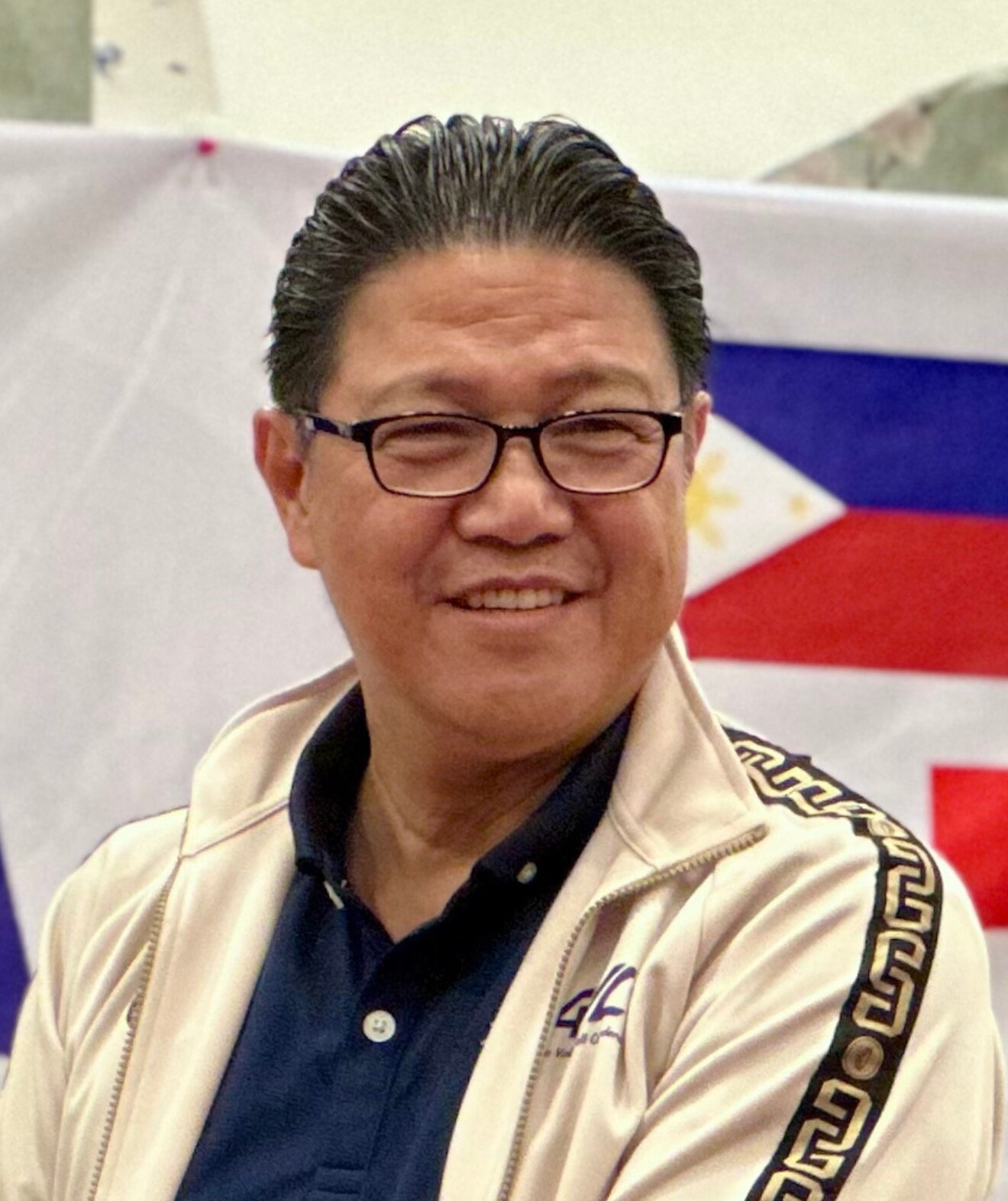
- Incumbent; Ramon Suzara since 1952
- Asian Volleyball Confederation (AVC)
- Appointer: AVC General Assembly
- Term length: Four years; renewable
- Formation: 1952
- First holder: Masaichi Nishikawa
- Succession: Senior executive vice-president
- Website: asianvolleyball.net

The following is a list of presidents of the Asian Volleyball Confederation (AVC), one of five continental bodies of governance in volleyball. It governs indoor volleyball, beach volleyball and other disciplines in Asia and Oceania, excluding the transcontinental countries of Russia, Turkey, Azerbaijan, and Georgia, as well as the West Asian countries of Cyprus, Armenia and Israel.

Masaichi Nishikawa acted as the first president. The current president is Ramon Suzara, a Philippine National Volleyball Federation president, who was elected as AVC's ninth president at the 25th AVC General Assembly in Bangkok in August 2024.

== Presidents of the AVC ==
No.	Portrait	Name (born–died)	Term of office			Country	Ref.
No.	Portrait	Name (born–died)	Took office	Left office	Time in office	Country	Ref.
1		Masaichi Nishikawa (1899–1986)	1952	1976	24 years	Japan	
2		Nemesio Yabut (1925–1986)	1976	1979	3 years	Philippines	
3		Yutaka Maeda (1915–1997)	1979	1985	6 years	Japan	
4		Yasutaka Matsudaira (1930–2011)	1985	1996	11 years	Japan	
5		Yuan Weimin (1939–)	1997	2001	4 years	China	
6		Wei Jizhong (1936–)	2001	2008	7 years	China	
7		Saleh Ahmad Bin Nasser (1942–)	4 November 2008	27 October 2020	11 years, 354 days	Saudi Arabia	
8		Rita Subowo (1948–)	27 October 2020	30 August 2024	3 years, 308 days	Indonesia	
9		Ramon Suzara (1959–)	30 August 2024	Incumbent	2 years, 68 days	Philippines	

Notes

- Wei Jizhong served as the third FIVB president from 2008 to 2012.
