= 2024–25 Prime Minister Cup NVA Men's Volleyball League =

Season of Nepalese men's professional volleyball

- Association: Nepal Volleyball Association
- League: Prime Minister Cup NVA Volleyball League
- Sport: Indoor Volleyball
- Duration: 1 Jun – 8 Jun 2024
- Matches: 30 (Regular seasons)
- Teams: 8
- Streaming partner: Hamro Khelkud (youtube)

Finals
- Champions: Tiptop Help Nepal (4th title)
- Runners-up: Gandaki Province
- Finals MVP: (Pakistan) Mubashar Raza (Tiptop Help Nepal)

Seasons
- ← 2023–24 2025 →

The 2024–25 Prime Minister Cup NVA Men's Volleyball League is the 8th season of the Prime Minister Cup NVA Volleyball League, the top Nepalese professional league for men's volleyball clubs. It was established in 2013 and is also known as RBB PM Cup NVA Volleyball League due to the sponsorship deal with Rastriya Banijya Bank. A total of eight teams will compete in the league. The season began on 1 June 2024 and is scheduled to conclude on 8 June 2024.

== Venue ==
- Dasarath Stadium covered Hall, Tripureshwar

== Teams ==
Top 8 team of the NVA Club Volleyball Championship (which is the qualification for this tournament) participated.

=== Personnel and kits ===
Team	Manager	Head Coach	Captain	Kit Manufacturer	Shirt Sponsors
APF Club	Suresh Chaudhary	(Nepal) Mahesh Chaudhary	(Nepal) Mahendra Shrestha	Kelme	
Budhanilkantha V.C.	Nischal Rai	(Nepal) Ram Khadka	(Nepal) Dhiraj Kaji Basnet	Kelme	
Gandaki Province	Rajendra G.C.	(Nepal) Ramesh K.C.		Kelme	
Koshi Province	Lekhnath Parajuli	(Nepal) Khem Rai	(Nepal) Bishnu Bashnet		
Nepal Army	Narendra Saini	(Nepal) Jagat Bahadhur Shingh	(Nepal) Ishwor Thapa	Kelme	
Nepal Police	Bharat Karki	(Nepal) Chandra Bahadhur Kunwar	(Nepal) Hem Rana		
Sudurpashchim Province		(Nepal) Lal Bahadhur Patala			
Tiptop Help Nepal	Chamak Narayan Shrestha	(Nepal) Utshav Khadka	(Nepal) Top Bahadhur Thapa	Kelme	

== League standings ==
Win by 3–0 margin: 3 Points
Win by any other margin: 2 Points
Loss: 0 Points

If the teams are level on points, the number of sets won will be taken into consideration. The top two teams at the end of the league stage will move into the finals.

Pos	Team	Pld	W	L	Pts	SW	SL	SR	SPW	SPL	SPR	Qualification
1	Gandaki Province	7	7	0	17	21	5	4.200	169	148	1.142	Qualified for Final
2	Tiptop Help Nepal	7	6	1	18	20	4	5.000	102	83	1.229	Qualified for Final
3	Nepal Police	7	5	2	13	15	9	1.667	75	51	1.471	Qualified for Third Place
4	Nepal Army	7	4	3	14	14	9	1.556	150	109	1.376	Qualified for Third Place
5	APF Club	7	3	4	9	12	14	0.857	193	194	0.995	
6	Sudurpashchim Province	7	2	5	5	6	16	0.375	51	75	0.680	
7	Budhanilkantha V.C.	7	1	6	5	5	17	0.294	138	177	0.780	
8	Koshi Province	7	0	7	3	4	21	0.190	103	150	0.687	

Updated to match(es) played on 4 October 2024. Source:

== League stage ==
Date	Time		Score		Set 1	Set 2	Set 3	Set 4	Set 5	Total	Report
1 Jun	9:00	Budhanilkantha V.C.	1–3	Tiptop Help Nepal	20–25	12–25	29–27	22–25		83–102	
1 Jun	11:00	Nepal Police	3–0	Sudurpashchim Province	25–20	25–15	25–16			75–51	
1 Jun	13:00	APF Club	1–3	Gandaki Province	22–25	25–19	20–25	19–25		86–94	
1 Jun	19:00	Nepal Army	3–0	Koshi Province	25–17	25–18	25–19			75–54	
2 Jun	12:00	Budhanilkantha V.C.	0–3	Nepal Army	15–25	20–25	20–25			55–75	
2 Jun	14:00	Gandaki Province	3–0	Sudurpashchim Province	25–22	25–22	25–18			75–62	
2 Jun	16:00	APF Club	2–3	Nepal Police	25–21	23–25	25–14	21–25	13–15	107–100	
2 Jun	18:00	Koshi Province	0–3	Tiptop Help Nepal	14–25	21–25	14–25			49–75	
3 Jun	12:00	Budhanilkantha V.C.	0–3	Nepal Police	20–25	19–25	18–25			57–75	
3 Jun	14:00	Sudurpashchim Province	0–3	Tiptop Help Nepal	19–25	20–25	22–25			61–75	
3 Jun	16:00	APF Club	0–3	Nepal Army	22–25	20–25	23–25			65–75	
3 Jun	18:00	Gandaki Province	3–0	Koshi Province	25–21	25–19	25–20			75–60	
4 Jun	8:00	Nepal Police	3–0	Koshi Province	25–16	25–15	25–22			75–53	
4 Jun	10:00	Budhanilkantha V.C.	1–3	Gandaki Province	14–25	25–22	18–25	22–25		79–97	
4 Jun	12:00	Nepal Army	3–0	Sudurpashchim Province	25–22	25–15	25–22			75–59	
4 Jun	14:00	APF Club	0–3	Tiptop Help Nepal	18–25	24–26	22–25			64–76	
5 Jun	12:00	Koshi Province	1–3	Sudurpashchim Province	25–19	21–25	22–25	16–25		84–94	
5 Jun	14:00	Nepal Army	1–3	Nepal Police	27–25	24–26	21–25	18–25		90–101	
5 Jun	16:00	Gandaki Province	3–2	Tiptop Help Nepal	27–25	21–25	28–30	25–21	15–9	116–110	
5 Jun	18:00	APF Club	3–1	Budhanilkantha V.C.	22–25	25–14	25–20	25–16		97–75	
6 Jun	12:00	APF Club	3–1	Koshi Province	22–25	12–25	14–25	25–19		73–94	
6 Jun	14:00	Nepal Police	0–3	Tiptop Help Nepal	21–25	22–25	20–25			63–75	
6 Jun	16:00	Gandaki Province	3–1	Nepal Army	25–17	24–26	25–20	25–21		99–84	
6 Jun	18:00	Budhanilkantha V.C.	0–3	Sudurpashchim Province	19–25	18–25	18–25			55–75	
7 Jun	12:00	Budhanilkantha V.C.	3–2	Koshi Province	25–23	12–25	25–12	18–25	16–14	96–99	
7 Jun	14:00	APF Club	3–0	Sudurpashchim Province	25–16	25–21	25–22			75–59	
7 Jun	16:00	Nepal Army	0–3	Tiptop Help Nepal	17–25	15–25	21–25			53–75	
7 Jun	18:00	Gandaki Province	3–0	Nepal Police	25–18	25–22	25–16			75–56	

== Final Stage ==
=== Third Place Match ===
Date	Time		Score		Set 1	Set 2	Set 3	Set 4	Set 5	Total	Report
8 Jun	10:00	Nepal Army	2-3	Nepal Police	29–31	25–13	25–22	23–25	8–15	110–106	

=== Final ===
Date	Time		Score		Set 1	Set 2	Set 3	Set 4	Set 5	Total	Report
8 Jun	15:00	Gandaki Province	1-3	Tiptop Help Nepal	22–25	25–20	20–25	20–25		87–95	

== Final standing ==
Rank	Team
1st place, gold medalist(s)	Tiptop Help Nepal
2nd place, silver medalist(s)	Gandaki Province
3rd place, bronze medalist(s)	Nepal Police
4	Nepal Army
5	APF Club
6	Sudurpashchim Province
7	Budhanilkantha V.C.
8	Koshi Province

Qualified for the 2024 CAVA Men's Club Championship

== Awards ==
=== Player of the Match ===
Match No.	Player of the Match	
Match No.	Player	Club
1		Tiptop Help Nepal
2	(Nepal) Rabin Chand	Nepal Police
3	(India) Santosh Sahaya	Gandaki Province
4	(Nepal) Dhan Bd. Bhatta (Chhetri)	Nepal Army
5	(Nepal) Man Bd. Shrestha	Nepal Army
6	(India) Ukra Pandyan	Gandaki Province
7	(Nepal) Pahal Gahatraj	Nepal Police
8	(Pakistan) Mubashar Raza	Tiptop Help Nepal
9	(Nepal) Em Rana Magar	Nepal Police
10	(Pakistan) Adnan Khan	Tiptop Help Nepal
11	(Nepal) Ishwor Thapa	Nepal Army
12	(Nepal) Himal Sunari	Gandaki Province
13	(Nepal) Bhim Gaha	Nepal Police
14	(Nepal) Rabi K.C.	Gandaki Province
15	(Nepal) Durga Bd. Khadka	Nepal Army
16	(Nepal) Sanju Bikram Saha	Tiptop Help Nepal
17	(India) Dilip Das	Sudurpashchim Province
18	(Nepal) Rabin Nagarkoti	Nepal Police
19	(India) Raman Kumar	Gandaki Province
20	(Nepal) Bijay Thapa	APF Club
21	(Nepal) Rupendra Nepali	APF Club
22	(Pakistan) Mubashar Raza (2)	Tiptop Help Nepal
23	(India) Santosh Sahaya (2)	Gandaki Province
24	(India) Dilip Das (2)	Sudurpashchim Province
25	(Nepal) Dhiraj Kaji Bashnet	Budhanilkantha V.C.
26	(Nepal) Ramesh B.K.	APF Club
27	(Pakistan) Mubashar Raza (3)	Tiptop Help Nepal
28	(India) Santosh Sahaya (3)	Gandaki Province
29	(Nepal) Safal B.K.	Nepal Police
30	(Pakistan) Mazhar Ali	Tiptop Help Nepal
