= Help Nepal Sports Club =

Nepalese volleyball team

- Founded: November 13, 2023; 2 years ago
- Owner: Beacon Sports
- Chairman: (Nepal) Basudev Shrestha
- Head coach: (Nepal) Utsav Khadka
- Captain: (Nepal) Subas Kunwar
- League: NVA Volleyball League
- 2025: 1st place
- Website: Club home page

Uniforms
Home	Away

Help Nepal Sports Club (HNSC), also known as Tip Top Help Nepal Sports Club, is a professional volleyball club based in Kathmandu, Nepal. Officially registered in 2023, the club currently competes in the PM Cup NVA Volleyball League and holds the record for the highest number of league championships, with a total of five titles.

== Programs ==
Its programs include:

- Youth development camps: free training sessions for underprivileged youth across Kathmandu and neighboring districts, fostering early engagement in sports.
- Women’s Volleyball Initiative: a targeted effort to increase female participation in competitive sports, empowering young women through athletic opportunities.
- School and community outreach: HNSC partners with educational institutions and local NGOs to integrate sports into daily learning and expand access to facilities and coaching in marginalized areas. This dual approach promotes physical activity, holistic development, and inclusive participation across diverse communities.
- Annual tournaments: Including the Help Nepal Cup, an inter-school football competition promoting friendly rivalry and talent scouting.

== Partnerships ==
HNSC maintains ties with various organizations including:

- Help Nepal Network – providing logistical and promotional support
- Local education institutions – for venue access and talent development
- Corporate sponsors – for funding equipment and tournament expenses

== Team roster ==
Season 2025

As of July 17, 2025

HNSC volleyball team – 2025
No.	Name	Height	Position
1	(Nepal) Subas Kunwar (C)		Setter
3	(Nepal) Chiranjibi Khadka		Middle Blocker
4	(Nepal) Manish Manandhar		Middle Blocker
5	(Nepal) Yam Bahadur Bhandari		spiker
7	(Pakistan) Usman Faryad Ali		Outside Hitter
8	(Nepal) Rabin Chand		Outside Hitter
11	(Nepal) Bishnu Bahadur Chhetri		Spiker
12	(Nepal) Santosh Rai		Libero
13	(Pakistan) Muhammad Kashif Naveed		Setter
14	(Nepal) Safal Bishokarma		Middle Blocker
15	(Pakistan) Murad Jehan		Outside Hitter
17	(Nepal) Rabin Nagarkoti		Blocker
18	(Nepal) Binod Bahadur chand		Libero

Coach	(Nepal) Utsav Khadka
Asst. Coach	(Nepal) Sujan K.C.
Assistant Caoches	(Nepal) Sushila Thapa
Team Manager	(Nepal) Jhamak Narayan Shrestha
Team Manager	(Nepal) Manoj Kumar Shrestha
Physio	(Nepal) Sajan Kumar Upadhayay

== Honours ==
=== CAVA Club Volleyball Championship ===
- Runners Up (1): 2024
- Third Place (1): 2025

=== Domestic League ===
- PM Cup NVA Volleyball League
  - Champions (5): 2016–17, 2021–22, 2023–24, 2024–25, 2025
  - Runners Up (2): 2018–19, 2022–23

== See also ==
- Sports in Nepal
- Volleyball in Nepal
- Prime Minister Cup NVA Volleyball League
