= Bangladesh men's national under-23 volleyball team =

Bangladesh U-23
- Association: Bangladesh Volleyball Federation
- Confederation: AVC
- Head coach: Abir Chowdhury

Uniforms
Home	Away

FIVB U23 World Championship
- Appearances: 0

Asian U-23 Championship
- Appearances: None

The Bangladesh men's national under-23 volleyball team represents Bangladesh in international men's volleyball competitions and friendly matches under the age 23 and it is ruled by the Bangladesh Volleyball Federation (BVF).

== Competitions records ==
=== FIVB U-23 World Championship ===
Champions Runners up Third place Fourth place

FIVB U23 World Championship records
Year	Round	Position	Pld	W	L	SW	SL	Squad
(Brazil) 2013	Did not qualify							
2013	Did not qualify							
(United Arab Emirates) 2015	Did not qualify							
(Egypt) 2017	Did not qualify							
Total	0 Titles	0/4	0	0	0	0	0	—

=== Asian U-23 Championship ===
Champions Runners up Third place Fourth place

Asian U23 Championship records
Year	Round	Position	Pld	W	L	SW	SL	Squad
(Myanmar) 2015	Did not participate							
(Iran) 2017	Did not participate							
(Myanmar) 2019	Did not participate							
Total	0 Titles	0/3	0	0	0	0	0	—
