= Bangladesh women's national under-21 volleyball team =

Bangladesh U-21
- Association: Bangladesh Volleyball Federation (BVF)
- Confederation: AVC
- Head coach: Md Sazzad Karim

Uniforms
Home	Away

FIVB U21 World Championship
- Appearances: No Appearances

Asian U-20 Championship
- Appearances: No Appearances

The Bangladesh women's national under-21 volleyball team represents Bangladesh in women's under-20 & under-21 volleyball events, it is controlled and managed by the Bangladesh Volleyball Federation that is a member of Asian volleyball body Asian Volleyball Confederation (AVC) and the international volleyball body government the Fédération Internationale de Volleyball (FIVB).

== History ==
=== FIVB U-21 World Championship ===
Champions Runners up Third place Fourth place

FIVB U21 World Championship records
Year	Result	Position	GP	MW	ML	SW	SL	Squad
(Brazil) 1977	Did not qualify							
(Mexico) 1981	Did not qualify							
(Italy) 1985	Did not qualify							
(South Korea) 1987	Did not qualify							
(Peru) 1989	Did not qualify							
(Czechoslovakia) 1991	Did not qualify							
(Brazil) 1993	Did not qualify							
(Thailand) 1995	Did not qualify							
(Poland) 1997	Did not qualify							
(Canada) 1999	Did not qualify							
(Dominican Republic) 2001	Did not qualify							
(Thailand) 2003	Did not qualify							
(Turkey) 2005	Did not qualify							
(Thailand) 2007	Did not qualify							
(Mexico) 2009	Did not qualify							
(Peru) 2011	Did not qualify							
(Czech Republic) 2013	Did not qualify							
(Puerto Rico) 2015	Did not qualify							
(Mexico) 2017	Did not qualify							
(Mexico) 2019	Did not qualify							
(Belgium) (Netherlands) 2021	Did not qualify							
(Mexico) 2023	Did not qualify							
(Indonesia) 2025	Did not qualify							
Total	0 Title	0/23	0	0	0	0	0	—

=== Asian U-20 Championship ===
Champions Runners up Third place Fourth place

Asian U-20 Championship records
Host	Result	Position	Pld	W	L	SW	SL	Squad
(South Korea) 1980	Did not participate							
(Australia) 1984	Did not participate							
(Thailand) 1986	Did not participate							
(Indonesia) 1988	Did not participate							
(Thailand) 1990	Did not participate							
(Malaysia) 1992	Did not participate							
(Philippines) 1994	Did not participate							
(Thailand) 1996	Did not participate							
(Thailand) 1998	Did not participate							
(Philippines) 2000	Did not participate							
(Vietnam) 2002	Did not participate							
(Sri Lanka) 2004	Did not participate							
(Thailand) 2006	Did not participate							
(Chinese Taipei) 2008	Did not participate							
(Vietnam) 2010	Did not participate							
(Thailand) 2012	Did not participate							
(Taiwan) 2014	Did not participate							
(Thailand) 2016	Did not participate							
(Vietnam) 2018	Did not participate							
(China) 2020	Tournament Did not held due to COVID-19 pandemic							
(Kazakhstan) 2022	Did not participate							
(China) 2024	Did not participate							
Total	0 Title	0/21	0	0	0	0	0	—
