= 1993 FIVB Volleyball Women's U20 World Championship =

1993 FIVB Women's U20 World Championship
Tournament details
- Host country: Brazil
- Dates: August 13–22, 1993
- Teams: 16
- Venues: 2 (in Brasília and Campinas host cities)

Final positions
- Champions: Cuba (2nd title)

Tournament awards
- MVP: (Cuba) Taismary Aguero

The 1993 FIVB Women's U20 World Championship was held in Brasília and Campinas, Brazil from August 13 to 22, 1993. 16 teams participated in the tournament.

== Qualification process ==
Confederation	Method of Qualification	Date	Venue	Vacancies	Qualified
FIVB	Host			1	Brazil
NORCECA	NORCECA Election			2	Cuba; Mexico
CEV	1992 European Junior Championship	September 4 – 12, 1992	Serres, Greece	3	Italy; Germany*; Hungary**
AVC	1992 Asian Junior Championship	August 22 – 29, 1992	Kuala Lumpur, Malaysia	4	China; South Korea; Chinese Taipei; Japan***
CSV	1992 South American Junior Championship	September 22 – 27, 1992	Oruro, Bolivia	3	Argentina; Peru; Bolivia
CAVB	African Election			1	Algeria
FIVB	Wild card			2	Ukraine; Latvia
Total				16	

- * Germany replaced Russia.
- ** Hungary replaced Czechoslovakia.
- *** Japan replaced Australia.

== Pools composition ==
Pool A	Pool B	Pool C	Pool D
Brazil; Algeria; Chinese Taipei; Ukraine	Cuba; Bolivia; Hungary; South Korea	Argentina; Italy; Japan; Latvia	China; Germany; Mexico; Peru

Pool E		Pool F	
1A	Ukraine	1B	Cuba
1D	Peru	1C	Italy
2A	Brazil	2B	South Korea
2D	Germany	2C	Japan
3A	Chinese Taipei	3B	Hungary
3D	China	3C	Argentina

== Preliminary round ==
=== Pool A ===
Pos	Team	Pld	W	L	Pts	SW	SL	SR	SPW	SPL	SPR	Qualification
1	Ukraine	3	3	0	6	9	0	MAX	135	76	1.776	Second round
2	Brazil	3	2	1	5	6	3	2.000	119	88	1.352	Second round
3	Chinese Taipei	3	1	2	4	3	6	0.500	102	102	1.000	Second round
4	Algeria	3	0	3	3	0	9	0.000	45	135	0.333	13th place

Date		Score		Set 1	Set 2	Set 3	Set 4	Set 5	Total
13 Aug	Ukraine	3–0	Chinese Taipei	15–7	15–9	15–13			45–29
13 Aug	Brazil	3–0	Algeria	15–5	15–9	15–1			45–15
14 Aug	Ukraine	3–0	Brazil	15–8	15–12	15–9			45–29
14 Aug	Chinese Taipei	3–0	Algeria	15–3	15–8	15–1			45–12
15 Aug	Ukraine	3–0	Algeria	15–0	15–6	15–12			45–18
15 Aug	Brazil	3–0	Chinese Taipei	15–12	15–7	15–9			45–28

=== Pool B ===
Pos	Team	Pld	W	L	Pts	SW	SL	SR	SPW	SPL	SPR	Qualification
1	Cuba	3	3	0	6	9	0	MAX	135	49	2.755	Second round
2	South Korea	3	2	1	5	6	3	2.000	107	57	1.877	Second round
3	Hungary	3	1	2	4	3	6	0.500	69	103	0.670	Second round
4	Bolivia	3	0	3	3	0	9	0.000	33	135	0.244	13th place

Date		Score		Set 1	Set 2	Set 3	Set 4	Set 5	Total
13 Aug	Cuba	3–0	Hungary	15–9	15–2	15–5			45–16
13 Aug	South Korea	3–0	Bolivia	15–3	15–0	15–1			45–4
14 Aug	Cuba	3–0	Bolivia	15–2	15–4	15–10			45–16
14 Aug	South Korea	3–0	Hungary	15–1	15–1	15–6			45–8
15 Aug	Hungary	3–0	Bolivia	15–8	15–2	15–3			45–13
15 Aug	Cuba	3–0	South Korea	15–7	15–10	15–0			45–17

=== Pool C ===
Pos	Team	Pld	W	L	Pts	SW	SL	SR	SPW	SPL	SPR	Qualification
1	Italy	3	3	0	6	9	1	9.000	143	66	2.167	Second round
2	Japan	3	2	1	5	7	3	2.333	131	100	1.310	Second round
3	Argentina	3	1	2	4	3	7	0.429	93	134	0.694	Second round
4	Latvia	3	0	3	3	1	9	0.111	75	142	0.528	13th place

Date		Score		Set 1	Set 2	Set 3	Set 4	Set 5	Total
13 Aug	Japan	3–0	Latvia	15–10	15–7	15–7			45–24
13 Aug	Italy	3–0	Argentina	15–2	15–9	15–7			45–18
14 Aug	Japan	3–0	Argentina	15–12	15–5	15–6			45–23
14 Aug	Italy	3–0	Latvia	15–3	15–3	15–1			45–7
15 Aug	Argentina	3–1	Latvia	15–9	5–15	17–15	15–5		52–44
15 Aug	Italy	3–1	Japan	8–15	15–12	15–2	15–12		53–41

=== Pool D ===
Pos	Team	Pld	W	L	Pts	SW	SL	SR	SPW	SPL	SPR	Qualification
1	Peru	3	3	0	6	9	4	2.250	174	131	1.328	Second round
2	Germany	3	2	1	5	8	5	1.600	179	133	1.346	Second round
3	China	3	1	2	4	6	6	1.000	136	161	0.845	Second round
4	Mexico	3	0	3	3	1	9	0.111	83	147	0.565	13th place

Date		Score		Set 1	Set 2	Set 3	Set 4	Set 5	Total
13 Aug	China	3–0	Mexico	16–14	15–10	15–11			46–35
13 Aug	Peru	3–2	Germany	15–12	15–12	8–15	8–15	15–11	61–65
14 Aug	Germany	3–1	Mexico	15–10	15–5	11–15	15–9		56–39
14 Aug	Peru	3–2	China	15–9	14–16	9–15	15–10	15–7	68–57
15 Aug	Peru	3–0	Mexico	15–3	15–0	15–6			45–9
15 Aug	Germany	3–1	China	15–11	13–15	15–5	15–2		58–33

== Second round ==
=== Pool E ===
Pos	Team	Pld	W	L	Pts	SW	SL	SR	SPW	SPL	SPR	Qualification
1	Ukraine	5	5	0	10	15	2	7.500	250	127	1.969	Semifinals
2	Peru	5	4	1	9	13	9	1.444	267	265	1.008	Semifinals
3	Germany	5	2	3	7	10	10	1.000	248	238	1.042	5th place
4	Brazil	5	2	3	7	8	9	0.889	205	221	0.928	7th place
5	China	5	1	4	6	6	14	0.429	195	279	0.699	9th place
6	Chinese Taipei	5	1	4	6	5	13	0.385	206	241	0.855	11th place

Date		Score		Set 1	Set 2	Set 3	Set 4	Set 5	Total
17 Aug	Peru	3–0	Chinese Taipei	15–13	15–9	15–11			45–33
17 Aug	Ukraine	3–0	China	15–3	15–9	15–4			45–16
17 Aug	Germany	3–0	Brazil	15–6	16–14	15–12			46–32
18 Aug	China	3–2	Chinese Taipei	10–15	15–13	4–15	15–6	15–13	59–62
18 Aug	Ukraine	3–1	Germany	15–2	15–11	13–15	15–4		58–32
18 Aug	Peru	3–2	Brazil	13–15	14–16	15–8	15–8	15–6	72–53
19 Aug	Chinese Taipei	3–1	Germany	16–14	8–15	15–9	15–9		54–47
19 Aug	Ukraine	3–1	Peru	15–2	12–15	15–3	15–1		57–21
19 Aug	Brazil	3–0	China	16–14	15–3	15–13			46–30

=== Pool F ===
Pos	Team	Pld	W	L	Pts	SW	SL	SR	SPW	SPL	SPR	Qualification
1	Cuba	5	5	0	10	15	1	15.000	233	119	1.958	Semifinals
2	South Korea	5	4	1	9	12	5	2.400	218	178	1.225	Semifinals
3	Italy	5	3	2	8	12	7	1.714	255	190	1.342	5th place
4	Japan	5	2	3	7	7	11	0.636	213	213	1.000	7th place
5	Hungary	5	1	4	6	5	13	0.385	142	241	0.589	9th place
6	Argentina	5	0	5	5	1	15	0.067	119	239	0.498	11th place

Date		Score		Set 1	Set 2	Set 3	Set 4	Set 5	Total
17 Aug	Cuba	3–0	Argentina	15–7	15–0	15–6			45–13
17 Aug	Italy	3–0	Hungary	15–4	15–4	15–4			45–12
17 Aug	South Korea	3–0	Japan	15–13	15–13	15–10			45–36
18 Aug	Hungary	3–1	Argentina	13–15	16–14	15–2	15–11		59–42
18 Aug	South Korea	3–2	Italy	9–15	10–15	15–10	17–16	15–10	66–66
18 Aug	Cuba	3–0	Japan	15–6	15–9	15–12			45–27
19 Aug	South Korea	3–0	Argentina	15–7	15–7	15–9			45–23
19 Aug	Japan	3–2	Hungary	13–15	6–15	15–5	15–6	15–6	64–47
19 Aug	Cuba	3–1	Italy	7–15	15–7	16–14	15–10		53–46

== Final round ==
=== Championship round ===
Semifinals
Cuba	3
Peru	1
Ukraine	3
South Korea	2

Final
Cuba	3
Ukraine	0
Third place
South Korea	3
Peru	0

=== Semifinals ===
Date		Score		Set 1	Set 2	Set 3	Set 4	Set 5	Total
21 Aug	Cuba	3–1	Peru	14–16	15–3	15–11	15–9		59–39
21 Aug	Ukraine	3–2	South Korea	10–15	15–7	4–15	15–9	15–13	59–59

=== Bronze medal match ===
Date		Score		Set 1	Set 2	Set 3	Set 4	Set 5	Total
22 Aug	South Korea	3–0	Peru	15–12	15–2	15–4			45–18

=== Gold medal match ===
Date		Score		Set 1	Set 2	Set 3	Set 4	Set 5	Total
22 Aug	Cuba	3–0	Ukraine	15–10	15–8	15–10			45–28

== Final standing ==
Rank	Team
1st place, gold medalist(s)	Cuba
2nd place, silver medalist(s)	Ukraine
3rd place, bronze medalist(s)	South Korea
4	Peru
5	Italy
5	Germany
7	Brazil
7	Japan
9	China
9	Hungary
11	Argentina
11	Chinese Taipei
13	Algeria
13	Bolivia
13	Latvia
13	Mexico

1993 FIVB Women's Junior World champions

Cuba
2nd title

== Individual awards ==
- MVP: (Cuba) Taismary Aguero
- Best spiker: (Ukraine) Olga Kolomiyets
- Best blocker: (Cuba) Regla Torres
- Best server: (Cuba) Taismary Aguero
- Best setter: (Cuba) Taismary Aguero
- Best receiver: (Ukraine) Victoria Ilarionova
- Best digger: (South Korea) Lee Mi-Jung
