= Hungary women's national under-21 volleyball team =

Hungary U20
- Association: Hungarian Volleyball Federation
- Confederation: CEV

Uniforms
| Home | Away | Third |

FIVB U21 World Championship
- Appearances: 1 (First in 1993)
- Best result: 9th Place : (1993)

Europe U19 Championship
- Appearances: 14 (First in 1966)
- Best result: Third place : (1973)
- Hungarian Volleyball Federation

The Hungary women's national under-20 volleyball team represents Hungary in international women's volleyball competitions and friendly matches under the age 20 and it is ruled by the Hungarian Volleyball Federation That is an affiliate of Federation of International Volleyball FIVB and also a part of European Volleyball Confederation CEV.

== Results ==
=== FIVB U21 World Championship ===
Champions Runners up Third place Fourth place

FIVB U21 World Championship
| Year | Round | Position | Pld | W | L | SW | SL | Squad |
|---|---|---|---|---|---|---|---|---|
| (Brazil) 1977 | Didn't qualify → ← | | | | | | | |
| (Czechoslovakia) 1991 | Didn't qualify → ← | | | | | | | |
| (Brazil) 1993 | | 9th place | | | | | | Squad |
| (Thailand) 1995 | Didn't qualify → ← | | | | | | | |
| (Belgium) (Netherlands) 2021 | Didn't qualify → ← | | | | | | | |
| Total | 0 Titles | 1/21 | | | | | | |

=== Europe Junior Championship ===
Champions Runners up Third place Fourth place

Europe Junior Championship
| Year | Round | Position | Pld | W | L | SW | SL | Squad |
|---|---|---|---|---|---|---|---|---|
| (Hungary) 1966 | | 7th place | | | | | | Squad |
| (Soviet Union) 1969 | | 6th place | | | | | | Squad |
| (Italy) 1971 | Didn't qualify | | | | | | | |
| (Netherlands) 1973 | | Third place | | | | | | Squad |
| (West Germany) 1975 | Didn't qualify | | | | | | | |
| (Socialist Federal Republic of Yugoslavia) 1977 | | 5th place | | | | | | Squad |
| (Spain) 1979 | | 7th place | | | | | | Squad |
| (West Germany) 1982 | | 9th place | | | | | | Squad |
| (France) 1984 | | 8th place | | | | | | Squad |
| (Bulgaria) 1986 | | 8th place | | | | | | Squad |
| (Italy) 1988 | Didn't qualify → ← | | | | | | | |
| (Austria) 1990 | Didn't qualify → ← | | | | | | | |
| (Greece) 1992 | | 10th place | | | | | | Squad |
| (Hungary) 1994 | | 9th place | | | | | | Squad |
| (Turkey) 1996 | Didn't qualify → ← | | | | | | | |
| (Belgium) 1998 | Didn't qualify → ← | | | | | | | |

Europe Junior Championship
| Year | Round | Position | Pld | W | L | SW | SL | Squad |
|---|---|---|---|---|---|---|---|---|
| (Switzerland) 2000 | | 10th place | | | | | | Squad |
| (Croatia) 2002 | | 12th place | | | | | | Squad |
| (Slovakia) 2004 | Didn't qualify → ← | | | | | | | |
| (Italy) 2008 | Didn't qualify → ← | | | | | | | |
| (Serbia) 2010 | | 12th place | | | | | | Squad |
| (Turkey) 2012 | Didn't qualify → ← | | | | | | | |
| (Finland) / (Estonia) 2014 | Didn't qualify → ← | | | | | | | |
| (Hungary) / (Slovakia) 2016 | | 10th place | | | | | | Squad |
| (Albania) 2018 | Didn't qualify → ← | | | | | | | |
| (North Macedonia) 2022 | Didn't qualify → ← | | | | | | | |
| Total | 0 Titles | 14/27 | | | | | | |

== Team ==
=== Current squad ===
The Following players is the Hungarian players that Competed in the 2018 Women's U19 Volleyball European Championship

| # | name | position | height | weight | birthday | spike | block |
| 1 | kovács lilla | middle-blocker | 179 | 61 | 2000 | 295 | 288 |
| 1 | tóth-bagi réka | setter | 170 | 67 | 2000 | 280 | 274 |
| 2 | szedmák réka | opposite | 186 | 76 | 2001 | 305 | 283 |
| 4 | sebestyén flóra | outside-spiker | 181 | 69 | 2001 | 290 | 279 |
| 5 | petrenkó brigitta | setter | 180 | 70 | 2000 | 289 | 283 |
| 7 | kökény petra | outside-spiker | 178 | 68 | 2000 | 293 | 282 |
| 8 | király anna mária | middle-blocker | 187 | 69 | 2001 | 303 | 286 |
| 9 | kundrák eszter | outside-spiker | 176 | 70 | 2000 | 285 | 270 |
| 10 | tettamanti virág | middle-blocker | 183 | 67 | 2001 | 290 | 284 |
| 11 | kalmár viktória | setter | 175 | 67 | 2001 | 262 | 270 |
| 14 | körtvélyessy réka luca | outside-spiker | 174 | 65 | 2000 | 294 | 287 |
| 16 | pap dorka | libero | 160 | 60 | 2001 | 262 | 255 |
| 17 | mihály dorka | outside-spiker | 170 | 65 | 2001 | 240 | 230 |
| 18 | halla gréta | opposite | 183 | 72 | 2001 | 292 | 270 |
| 20 | varga viktória | libero | 165 | 61 | 2000 | 263 | 255 |
| 22 | berkó vivien | libero | 164 | 57 | 2001 | 250 | 240 |
| 23 | oláh dóra | outside-spiker | 172 | 61 | 2000 | 284 | 271 |
| | glemboczki zóra | opposite | 182 | 72 | 2000 | 290 | 278 |
