= Bangladesh women's national under-23 volleyball team =

Volleyball team

Bangladesh
- Association: Bangladesh Volleyball Federation
- Confederation: AVC
- Head coach: Syed Ifterkhar Mridha

Uniforms
Home	Away

FIVB U23 World Championship
- Appearances: No Appearances

Asian U-23 Championship
- Appearances: No Appearances

The Bangladesh women's national under-23 volleyball team represents Bangladesh in women's under-23 volleyball events, it is controlled and managed by the Bangladesh Volleyball Federation that is a member of Asian volleyball body Asian Volleyball Confederation (AVC) and the international volleyball body government the Fédération Internationale de Volleyball (FIVB).

== Competitions records ==
=== FIVB U-23 World Championship ===
Champions Runners up Third place Fourth place

FIVB U-23 World Championship records
Host	Round	Position	Pld	W	L	SW	SL	Squad
(Mexico) 2013	Did not qualify							
(Turkey) 2015	Did not qualify							
(Slovenia) 2017	Did not qualify							
Total	0 Title	0/3	0	0	0	0	0	—

=== Asian U-23 Championship ===
Champions Runners up Third place Fourth place

Asian U-23 Championship records
Host	Round	Position	Pld	W	L	SW	SL	Squad
(Philippines) 2015	Did not participate							
(Thailand) 2017	Did not participate							
Total	0 Title	0/2	0	0	0	0	0	—
