= SAVA Princess Cup Volleyball Girls U18 Southeast Asian Championship =

Princess Cup Volleyball
- Current season, competition or edition: 2026 Princess Cup Volleyball Girls U18 Southeast Asian Championship
- Sport: Volleyball
- Founded: 2005
- First season: 2005
- Organizing body: Southeast Asian Volleyball Association
- No. of teams: 8
- Broadcaster: TrueVisions Now

The SAVA Princess Cup Volleyball Girls' U18 Southeast Asian Championship (organized under the Southeast Asian Volleyball Association, or SAVA) is a regional youth volleyball tournament held in Thailand for national under-18 female teams across Southeast Asia and guest nations.

== History ==
The SAVA Princess Cup Volleyball Girls' U18 Southeast Asian Championship (historically alternating between U17, U18, and U19 designations to match changing AVC and FIVB youth standards) is a biennial regional international volleyball tournament organized by the Southeast Asia Volleyball Association (SAVA).

While early iterations often operated as invitationals featuring developmental teams from outside the zone (such as India, Kazakhstan, and Australia), modern editions focus primarily on the development of Southeast Asian youth squads prior to continental qualification events.

== All time scores ==
Year	Edition	Host Nation	Host City	style="background:#FFD700;"|Champions	style="background:#C0C0C0;"|Runners-up	style="background:#CD7F32;"|Third place	Teams
2018	20th	THA	Nakhon Pathom	Thailand	India	Kazakhstan	7
2024	22nd	THA	Nakhon Pathom	Thailand	Indonesia	Philippines	6
2026	23rd	THA	Nakhon Ratchasima	Thailand	Vietnam	Philippines	8

== Knockout and medal match scores ==
=== 2026 (23rd Princess Cup) ===
The 23rd edition was held at Terminal Hall, Terminal 21, Nakhon Ratchasima, Thailand from 23 to 28 June 2026.

- Gold Medal Match

28 June 2026	'Thailand'	3–0	Vietnam	Terminal Hall, Terminal 21
28 June 2026	25–23, 29–27, 25–22			Terminal Hall, Terminal 21

- Bronze Medal Match

28 June 2026	'Philippines'	3–2	Indonesia	Terminal Hall, Terminal 21
28 June 2026	27–25, 27–29, 18–25, 25–22, 15–11			Terminal Hall, Terminal 21

=== 2024 (22nd Princess Cup) ===
The 22nd edition was played as a round-robin tournament with a direct championship final layout at the Nakhon Pathom Gymnasium, Nakhon Pathom, Thailand from 8 to 13 June 2024.

- Gold Medal Match

13 June 2024	'Thailand'	3–1	Indonesia	Nakhon Pathom Gymnasium
13 June 2024	25–19, 25–17, 24–26, 25–17			Nakhon Pathom Gymnasium

- Bronze Medal Match

13 June 2024	'Philippines'	3–0	Australia	Nakhon Pathom Gymnasium
13 June 2024	25–13, 25–21, 25–20			Nakhon Pathom Gymnasium

=== 2018 (20th Princess Cup) ===
The 20th edition was contested under the U17 specification at Nakhon Pathom, Thailand from 13 to 17 May 2018.

- Gold Medal Match

17 May 2018	'Thailand'	3–0	India	Nakhon Pathom Gymnasium
17 May 2018	25–11, 25–19, 25–17			Nakhon Pathom Gymnasium

- Bronze Medal Match

17 May 2018	'Kazakhstan'	3–1	Australia	Nakhon Pathom Gymnasium
17 May 2018	25–23, 21–25, 25–21, 25–13			Nakhon Pathom Gymnasium

== Final standings ==
Rank	2018	2024	2026
1st	Thailand	Thailand	Thailand
2nd	India	Indonesia	Vietnam
3rd	Kazakhstan	Philippines	Philippines
4th	Australia	Australia	Indonesia
5th	Malaysia	Singapore	Australia
6th	New Zealand	Malaysia	Hong Kong
7th	Singapore	—	Kyrgyzstan
8th	—	—	Malaysia

== Debut of teams ==
The following table tracks the chronological debut of national youth volleyball teams (including invited regional guest teams) in the tournament from 2005 to 2026.

Year	Debutant teams	Total
2005	Thailand, Indonesia, Malaysia, Singapore	4
2007–2012	No new debutants	0
2014	Philippines	1
2016	Vietnam	1
2018	Australia, India, Kazakhstan, New Zealand, Uzbekistan	5
2020–2022	No new debutants	0
2024	No new debutants	0
2026	Hong Kong, Kyrgyzstan	2

=== Notes ===
- Teams like Australia, India, Kazakhstan, New Zealand, Uzbekistan, Hong Kong, and Kyrgyzstan participate as invited guest member associations from the wider Asian Volleyball Confederation (AVC) to bolster regional developmental competition.

== Winners by years ==
1st Edition – 2004 2nd Edition – 2005 3rd Edition – 2006 4th Edition – 2007 5th Edition – 2008 6th Edition – 2009 7th Edition – 2010 8th Edition – 2011 9th Edition – 2012 10th Edition – 2013 11th Edition – 2014 12th Edition – 2015 13th Edition – 2016 14th Edition – 2017 15th Edition – 2018 16th Edition – 2019 17th Edition – 2020 18th Edition – 2021 19th Edition – 2022 20th Edition – 2023 21st Edition – 2024 (22nd edition noted in sources, suggesting 2024 hosted the 22nd edition) 22nd Edition – 2025 23rd Edition – 2026

== Teams ==
=== Southeast Asia ===
Thailand Vietnam Indonesia Philippines Malaysia

=== East Asia ===
Hong Kong

=== Oceania ===
Australia

=== Central Asia ===
Kyrgyzstan

=== South Asia ===
India

=== Oceania ===
New Zealand

=== Central Asia ===
Kazakhstan Uzbekistan

=== Southeast Asia ===
Singapore

== Season by years ==
1st Edition – 2004 2nd Edition – 2005 3rd Edition – 2006 4th Edition – 2007 5th Edition – 2008 6th Edition – 2009 7th Edition – 2010 8th Edition – 2011 9th Edition – 2012 10th Edition – 2013 11th Edition – 2014 12th Edition – 2015 13th Edition – 2016 14th Edition – 2017 15th Edition – 2018 16th Edition – 2019 17th Edition – 2020 18th Edition – 2021 19th Edition – 2022 20th Edition – 2023 21st Edition – 2024 (22nd edition noted in sources, suggesting 2024 hosted the 22nd edition) 22nd Edition – 2025 23rd Edition – 2026

== Broadcasters ==
The tournament is traditionally hosted in Thailand (frequently in Nakhon Ratchasima) and is broadcast through a combination of local digital terrestrial television networks, over-the-top (OTT) platforms, and free international digital streams provided by regional volleyball governing bodies.

Scope	Country	Network / Platform	Type	Ref.
(Thailand) Local Host 2026-Present	Thailand	T Sports 7	2022-2026	
(Thailand) Local Host 2026-Present	Thailand	Thairath TV	2016-2021	
(Thailand) Local Host 2026-Present	Thailand	SMM TV	2011-2015	
NBT Channel 11	2005-2010			
TrueVisions Now	OTT Streaming & Mobile App 2026-Present			
TrueID Sports	OTT Streaming & Mobile App 2022-2026			
TrueVisions	Pay TV 2016 -2021			
TVA Channel (YouTube)	Online Cloud Streaming (Free)			
(ASEAN) Regional / International	ASEAN	AVC Official Digital	YouTube / Facebook Live Streams	
(ASEAN) Regional / International	ASEAN	Local Member Associations (e.g., PNVF, PBVSI)	Localized Social Media Cross-streams	

=== Historical broadcasters (2005–present) ===
Over its history, the broadcasting landscape of the tournament has transitioned from traditional analog television to dedicated digital sports platforms:

- 2005–2010: Broadcasts were primarily carried on free-to-air analog networks via NBT (Channel 11) for selective final-round matches.
- 2011–2015: Comprehensive cable and satellite coverage debuted via SMM TV (Siam Inter Multimedia), establishing multi-match daily broadcasting.
- 2016–2021: Digital Terrestrial HD distribution debuted through a partnership with Thairath TV (Channel 32), running alongside the digital expansion of True Visions and TrueID Sports.
- 2022–2026: Current rights structure led by public sports specialty channel T Sports 7 alongside global open-access streaming via the Thailand Volleyball Association (TVA) YouTube feed.

== See also ==
- SEA V. League
- Southeast Asian Volleyball Association
- AVC Girls U18 Asian Championship
- Volleyball at Southeast Asian Games
