= 2018 Southeast Asian Girls' U17 Volleyball Championship =

Tournament details
- Host country: Thailand
- City: Nakhon Pathom
- Dates: 13–17 May
- Teams: 7 (from 1 confederation)

Final positions
- Champions: Thailand (3rd title)
- Runners-up: India
- Third place: Kazakhstan
- Fourth place: Australia

The 2018 Southeast Asian Girls' U17 Volleyball Championship, referred to as the 2018 Est Cola Southeast Asian Girls' U17 "Princess Cup" Volleyball Championship for sponsorship reasons, was the twentieth edition of the Princess Cup Volleyball Championship, a biennial international volleyball tournament organised by the Asian Volleyball Confederation (AVC), Southeast Asian Zonal Volleyball Association (SEAZVA) with Thailand Volleyball Association (TVA) for the girls' under-17 national teams of Southeast Asia. The tournament will be held in Nakhon Pathom, Thailand, from 13 to 17 May 2018.

A total of seven teams played in the tournament, with players born on or after 1 January 2001 eligible to participate.

== Qualification ==
The three SEAZVA member associations, also four invited team from the other two AVC affiliated zonal member associations will participate in the tournament with Thailand already qualified as host country, all teams participated in the 2018 Asian Girls' U17 Volleyball Championship, excluded Singapore.

=== Qualified teams ===
The following teams qualified for the tournament.

Means of qualification	Births	Qualified
Host country	1	Thailand
Southeast Asian team	2	Malaysia
Southeast Asian team	2	Singapore
Invited team	4	Australia
Invited team	4	(International Olympic Committee) India
Invited team	4	Kazakhstan
Invited team	4	New Zealand
Invited team	4	~~Uzbekistan~~
Total 7

== Pools composition ==
Pool A	Pool B
Thailand	Kazakhstan
Malaysia	(International Olympic Committee) India
Australia	Singapore
~~Uzbekistan~~	New Zealand

== Venue ==
- Nakhon Pathom Gymnasium in Mueang Nakhon Pathom, Nakhon Pathom

== Preliminary round ==
=== Pool standing procedure ===
1. Number of matches won
2. Match points
3. Sets ratio
4. Points ratio
5. Result of the last match between the tied teams

Match won 3–0 or 3–1: 3 match points for the winner, 0 match points for the loser
Match won 3–2: 2 match points for the winner, 1 match point for the loser
Match forfeited: 0 match points for each.

=== Pool A ===
Pos	Team	Pld	W	L	Pts	SW	SL	SR	SPW	SPL	SPR	Qualification
1	Thailand (H)	2	2	0	6	6	0	MAX	150	76	1.974	Semifinals
2	Australia	2	1	1	3	3	4	0.750	136	161	0.845	Semifinals
3	Malaysia	2	0	2	0	1	6	0.167	128	177	0.723	Fifth place
4	Uzbekistan	0	0	0	0	0	0	—	0	0	—	Withdrawn

Updated to match(es) played on unknown. Source:
Rules for classification: Pool standing procedure
(H) Host

Date	Time		Score		Set 1	Set 2	Set 3	Set 4	Set 5	Total	Report
13 May	18:00	Malaysia	1–3	Australia	22–25	29–27	19–25	16–25		86–102	AVC
14 May	18:00	Thailand	3–0	Malaysia	25–8	25–22	25–12			75–42	AVC
15 May	16:00	Thailand	3–0	Australia	25–7	25–11	25–16			75–34	AVC
13 May		Thailand	Cancelled	Uzbekistan	25–0	25–0	25–0			75–0	
14 May		Uzbekistan	Cancelled	Australia	0–25	0–25	0–25			0–75	
15 May		Uzbekistan	Cancelled	Malaysia	0–25	0–25	0–25			0–75	

=== Pool B ===
Pos	Team	Pld	W	L	Pts	SW	SL	SR	SPW	SPL	SPR	Qualification
1	(International Olympic Committee) India	3	3	0	8	9	2	4.500	248	202	1.228	Semifinals
2	Kazakhstan	3	2	1	6	6	3	2.000	202	172	1.174	Semifinals
3	New Zealand (Note: New Zealand withdrawn to playoff with Malaysia in Fifth place.)	3	1	2	4	6	6	1.000	258	260	0.992	
4	Singapore	3	0	3	0	1	9	0.111	218	218	1.000	Fifth place

Updated to match(es) played on unknown. Source:
Rules for classification: Pool standing procedure
Notes:

Date	Time		Score		Set 1	Set 2	Set 3	Set 4	Set 5	Total	Report
13 May	14:00	India (International Olympic Committee)	3–0	Singapore	25–17	25–19	25–20			75–56	AVC
13 May	16:00	Kazakhstan	3–0	New Zealand	25–18	25–21	25–15			75–54	AVC
13 May	14:00	Singapore	1–3	New Zealand	25–22	13–25	23–25	26–28		87–100	AVC
13 May	16:00	India (International Olympic Committee)	3–0	Kazakhstan	25–15	25–18	25–19			75–52	AVC
13 May	11:30	India (International Olympic Committee)	3–2	New Zealand	25–20	22–25	11–25	25–16	15–8	98–94	AVC
13 May	14:00	Singapore	0–3	Kazakhstan	19–25	12–25	12–25			43–75	AVC

== Final round ==
=== Bracket ===
Play-offs
16 May
Thailand	3
Kazakhstan	1
16 May
(International Olympic Committee) India	3
Australia	0

Final
17 May
Thailand	3
(International Olympic Committee) India	0
Third place
17 May
Kazakhstan	3
Australia	1

Fifth place
16 May
Malaysia	3
Singapore	1

==== Fifth place ====
Date	Time		Score		Set 1	Set 2	Set 3	Set 4	Set 5	Total	Report
16 May	14:00	Malaysia	3–1	Singapore	21–25	27–25	25–14	25–17		98–81	

==== Semi-finals ====
Date	Time		Score		Set 1	Set 2	Set 3	Set 4	Set 5	Total	Report
16 May	16:00	India (International Olympic Committee)	3–0	Australia	28–26	25–22	25–23			78–71	
16 May	18:00	Thailand	3–1	Kazakhstan	25–9	23–25	25–13	25–18		98–65	

==== Third place ====
Date	Time		Score		Set 1	Set 2	Set 3	Set 4	Set 5	Total	Report
17 May	14:00	Kazakhstan	3–1	Australia	22–25	25–15	25–12	25–17		97–69	

==== Final ====
Date	Time		Score		Set 1	Set 2	Set 3	Set 4	Set 5	Total	Report
17 May	16:00	Thailand	3–0	(International Olympic Committee) India	25–10	25–8	25–7			75–25	

== Final standing ==
Rank	Team
1st place, gold medalist(s)	Thailand
2nd place, silver medalist(s)	(International Olympic Committee) India
3rd place, bronze medalist(s)	Kazakhstan
4	Australia
5	Malaysia
6	Singapore
7	New Zealand

2018 Southeast Asian U17 champions

Thailand
3rd title

== Medalists ==
Gold	Silver	Bronze
Thailand	(International Olympic Committee) India	Kazakhstan

== Awards ==
- Most valuable player
- Best outside spikers
- Best setter
- Best opposite spiker
- Best middle blocker
- Best libero

== See also ==
- 2018 Asian Girls' U17 Volleyball Championship
