= Nepal Police women's volleyball team =

Professional volleyball club in Kathmandu, Nepal

Nepal Police V.C. Women
- Full name: Nepal Police Women's Volleyball Team
- Short name: NPC
- Nickname: The Cops
- Founded: 2003; 23 years ago
- Owner: Nepal Police
- Manager: Shwan Kumar Jha
- Captain: Kamala Pun
- League: PM Cup NVA Volleyball League
- 2024: Champions
- Website: Club home page
- Championships: PM CUP Champion

Uniforms
Home	Away

Nepal Police V.C. is a Nepalese women's professional volleyball club based in Kathmandu and owned and managed by Nepal Police. The club was founded in 2003 and currently a participant in the PM Cup NVA Volleyball League. NPC has a historic rivallry with Armed Police Force (APF) volleyball club, often facing them in tournament finals.

== History ==
In 2019, the Nepal Police Club won the National Women's Volleyball tournament title, defeating New Diamond Academy by 3–0. NPC V.C. became the first women's volleyball club from Nepal to participate in any international level club competition, by participating in the CAVA Women's Club Volleyball Championship 2024 organized by the CAVA, hosted by the Maldives Volleyball Association.

== Team roster (2024) ==
No.	Name	Height	Position
1	(Nepal) Shanti Kala Tamang		Libero
2	(Nepal) Usha Bhandari		Spiker
4	(Nepal) Kamana Bista		Spiker
5	(Nepal) Punam Chand		open spiker
6	(Nepal) Niruta Thagunna		open spiker
7	(Nepal) Saraswoti Chaudhary		Open Spiker
8	(Nepal) Kamala Pun (C)		Setter
10	(Nepal) Sumitra Regmi		Middle-blocker
11	(Nepal) Laxmi Chand		Spiker
12	(Nepal) Manisha Chaudhary		Outside Hitter
13	(Nepal) Tila Chaudhary		Setter
14	(Nepal) Ashika Chhetry		Spiker
16	(Nepal) Kopila Rana		Blocker
17	(Nepal) Sarashwoti Kattel		Setter
18	(Nepal) Babita Bohara		Spiker

Coach	(Nepal) Rupesh Kumar Bista
Assistant coach	(Nepal) Sushila Thapa
Team manager	(Nepal) Shwan Kumar Jha
Physio	(Nepal) Bibek Bikrant Adhikari

== Honours ==
=== CAVA Women's Club Volleyball Chmapioship ===
- Champions (1): 2024

=== Domestic league ===
- PM Cup NVA Volleyball League
  - Champions (3): 2023-24, 22024-25, 2025
  - Runner-up (3): 2016-17, 2018-19, 2021-22
