= Bangladesh men's national under-19 volleyball team =

Bangladesh
- Association: Bangladesh Volleyball Federation
- Confederation: AVC
- Head coach: Tanvirul Islam

Uniforms
Home	Away

Youth Olympic Games
- Appearances: No Appearances

FIVB U19 World Championship
- Appearances: No Appearances

Asian U18 Championship
- Appearances: 1 (First in 2017)
- Best result: 10th (2017)

The Bangladesh men's national under-19 volleyball team represents Bangladesh in men's under-19 volleyball events, it is controlled and managed by the Bangladesh Volleyball Federation (BVF) that is a member of Asian volleyball body Asian Volleyball Confederation (AVC) and the international volleyball body government the Fédération Internationale de Volleyball (FIVB).

== Competitions history ==
=== Summer Youth Olympics ===
Champions Runners up Third place Fourth place

Youth Olympic Games records
Year	Result	Position	Pld	W	L	SW	SL	Squad
(Singapore) 2010	Didn't Qualify							
(China) 2014	No Volleyball Event							
(Argentina) 2018	No Volleyball Event							
Total	0 Titles	0/1	0	0	0	0	0	—

=== FIVB U-19 World Championship ===
Champions Runners up Third place Fourth place

FIVB U19 World Championship records
Year	Round	Position	Pld	W	L	SW	SL	Squad
(United Arab Emirates) 1989	Did not qualify							
(Portugal) 1991	Did not qualify							
(Turkey) 1993	Did not qualify							
(Puerto Rico) 1995	Did not qualify							
(Iran) 1997	Did not qualify							
(Saudi Arabia) 1999	Did not qualify							
(Egypt) 2001	Did not qualify							
(Thailand) 2003	Did not qualify							
(Algeria) 2005	Did not qualify							
(Mexico) 2007	Did not qualify							
(Italy) 2009	Did not qualify							
(Argentina) 2011	Did not qualify							
(Mexico) 2013	Did not qualify							
(Argentina) 2015	Did not qualify							
(Bahrain) 2017	Did not qualify							
(Tunisia) 2019	Did not qualify							
(Iran) 2021	Did not qualify							
(Argentina) 2023	Did not qualify							
Total	0 Titles	0/18	0	0	0	0	0	—

=== Asian Boys' U-18 Volleyball Championship ===
Champions Runners up Third place Fourth place

Asian Boys' U-18 Championship records
Year	Result	Position	Pld	W	L	SW	SL	Squad
(Philippines) 1997	Did not participate							
(Taiwan) 1999	Did not participate							
(Iran) 2001	Did not participate							
(India) 2003	Did not participate							
(Iran) 2005	Did not participate							
(Malaysia) 2007	Did not participate							
(Sri Lanka) 2008	Did not participate							
(Iran) 2010	Did not participate							
(Iran) 2012	Did not participate							
(Sri Lanka) 2014	Did not participate							
(Myanmar) 2017	Group stage	10/11	4	2	2	6	8	—
(Iran) 2018	Did not participate							
(Iran) 2020	Did not participate							
(Iran) 2022	Did not participate							
(Bahrain) 2024	Did not participate							
Total	0 Titles	1/15	4	2	2	6	8	—
