= Mohammed bin Khalifa bin Ali Al Khalifa =

Bahraini politician

- محمد بن خليفة بن علي آل خليفة

Director of Customs at the Ministry of Interior (Bahrain)
- In office 2011 – December 28, 2016

Chairman of the Board of Directors of Batelco (Bahrain Telecommunications Corporation)
- In office December 28, 2016 – June 4, 2018
- Preceded by: Hamad bin Khalifa Al Khalifa
- Succeeded by: Abdullah bin Khalifa Al Khalifa

Personal details
- Relations: House of Khalifa
- Education: Alexandria University
- Profession: politician

Sheikh Mohammed bin Khalifa bin Ali Al Khalifa (Arabic: محمد بن خليفة بن علي آل خليفة) is a Bahraini politician.

== Biography ==
=== Education ===
He earned a Bachelor of Arts in Business Administration from Alexandria University in Egypt. Afterwards, he obtained a Certificate of Cadastre and Surveying in the United Kingdom and a Diploma in General Executive Administration in Switzerland.

=== Career ===
Al Khalifa was appointed to a series of government posts, including Supervisor of Procedures at the Survey and Land Registration Bureau, Director of Financial and Administrative Affairs and Assistant Under-Secretary for Financial and Administrative Affairs and Funds for Minors at the Ministry of Justice and Islamic Affairs, and Undersecretary at the Ministry of Communications. From April 2011 to 2016, he served as Director of Customs at the Ministry of Interior.

On December 28, 2016, he was appointed Chairman of the Board of Directors of Batelco. On June 4, 2018, however, he was replaced as such by Abdullah bin Khalifa Al Khalifa after a short tenure that saw the national telecommunications firm support the Mohammed bin Khalifa bin Salman Al Khalifa Cardiac Specialist Centre, the Crown Prince’s international scholarship program, the National Health Insurance Scheme (صحتي or “My Health”), the digital financial portfolio, and the Spring of Culture Festival.

=== Legacy ===
- Former member of the Deposit Protection Committee of the Bahrain Monetary Agency, Boards of Directors of Gulf Air and Batelco, and Bahraini Family Committee
- Represented Bahrain at Arab, Middle Eastern, and international conferences, most importantly meetings of the International Telecommunication Union in Geneva and the Council of Arab Ministers of Communications and Information
- Former President of the Bahraini Ardah Society and Vice-President of the Parents’ Council at Al Iman School in Isa Town
- Helped computerize the Ministry of Justice and Islamic Affairs and Bahrain Post and privatize the transportation and telecommunications sectors (was on the Higher Committee for Privatization of the Telecommunication Sector)

== Awards ==
He holds the Order of Sheikh Isa bin Salman Al Khalifa.
