= Bhutan Volleyball Federation =

Governing body of volleyball in Bhutan

- Sport: Volleyball
- Jurisdiction: Bhutan
- Abbreviation: BVBF
- Founded: 1973; 53 years ago
- Affiliation: FIVB
- Regional affiliation: AVC
- Headquarters: Thimphu, Bhutan
- President: Dasho Pema Chewang
- Secretary: Dasho Thinley Namgyel
- (Bhutan)

The Bhutan Volleyball Federation (BVBF) is the governing body of volleyball in Bhutan. It manages the men's, women's, and youth national teams.

Volleyball games at first were played outdoors only. The majority of tournaments are conducted at the Changlimithang Stadium in Thimphu.

With the introduction of Volleyball Super League, the country can get new players at the international stage.

== National teams ==
For details please refer to main articles for dedicated teams.

Men's

- Bhutan men's national volleyball team
- Under-21
- Under-19
- Under-17

Women's

- Bhutan women's national volleyball team
- Under-21
- Under-19
- Under-17
