= Prime Minister Cup NVA Volleyball League =

Nepalese volleyball league

- Current season, competition or edition: 2025 Prime Minister Cup NVA Men's Volleyball League; 2025 Prime Minister Cup NVA Women's Volleyball League
- Sport: Volleyball
- Founded: 2013; 13 years ago
- Administrator: National Sports Council; Nepal Volleyball Association
- No. of teams: Men: 8 Women: 6
- Country: Nepal
- Most recent champions: Men: Help Nepal V.C. Women: Nepal Police (2024–25)
- Most titles: Men: Help Nepal V.C. (4); Women: APF Club & New Diamond V.C. (3 titles each)
- Qualification: CAVA Club Championship
- Streaming partner: Hamro Khelkud
- Sponsor: Rastriya Banijya Bank
- Related competitions: NVA Club Volleyball Championship
- Website: volleyballnepal.np

The PM Cup NVA Volleyball League or NVA Volleyball League (Nepali: पिएम कप एनभिए लिग) is the top-level professional volleyball league for both men and women in Nepal. The league started in 2013.

The competitions are organized by the organized by Nepal Volleyball Association and supported by National Sports Council. The league also called NVA League.

== History ==
Before 2013, different club volleyball competitions used to be held with the monitor of NVA, when the single national level tournament was organized for both men and women.

== Teams (2025 season) ==
=== Men (8 teams) ===
S.N.	Teams
1	APF Club
2	Manimukunda V.C.
3	Gandaki Province
4	Koshi Province
5	Nepal Army
6	Nepal Police
7	Sudurpashchim Province
8	Help Nepal V.C.

=== Women (6 teams) ===
S.N.	Teams
1	APF Club
2	Nepal Police
3	New Diamond V.C.
4	Nepal Army
5	Karnali Province
6	Everest V.C.

== Champions ==
=== Men's champions ===
==== Titles by season ====
Season	Champions	Runners-up
2013-14	Nepal Police	
2014/15	Nepal Police	APF Club
2016/17	Help Nepal V.C.	Nepal Army
2018/19	Nepal Army	Help Nepal V.C.
2021/22	Help Nepal V.C.	APF Club
2022/23	Nepal Army	Help Nepal V.C.
2023/24	Help Nepal V.C.	Nepal Police
2024/25	Help Nepal V.C.	Gandaki Province
2025	Help Nepal V.C.	Gandaki Province

==== Titles by club ====
Club	Champions	Runners-up
Help Nepal V.C.	5	2
Nepal Army	2	1
Nepal Police	2	1
APF Club	-	2
Gandaki Province	-	2

=== Women's champions ===
==== Titles by season ====
Season	Champions	Runners-up
2013/14	APF Club	New Diamond V.C.
2014/15	APF Club	
2016/17	New Diamond V.C.	Nepal Police
2018/19	APF Club	Nepal Police
2021/22	New Diamond V.C.	Nepal Police
2022/23	New Diamond V.C.	APF Club
2023/24	Nepal Police	APF Club
2024/25	Nepal Police	Everest V.C.
2025	Nepal Police	New Diamond V.C.

==== Titles by club ====
Club	Champions	Runners-up
Nepal Police	3	3
APF Club	3	2
New Diamond V.C.	3	2
Everest V.C.	-	1

== Title sponsors ==
Edition	Season	Name
4th	2018/19	Rastriya Banijya Bank
5th	2021/22	Rastriya Banijya Bank
6th	2022/23	Rastriya Banijya Bank
7th	2023/24	
8th	2024/25	Rastriya Banijya Bank

== See also ==
- Everest Women's Volleyball League
