= Bhutan men's national volleyball team =

National volleyball team

Bhutan
- Association: Bhutan Volleyball Federation
- Confederation: AVC
- FIVB ranking: NR (5 October 2025)

Uniforms
Home	Away

The Bhutan men's national volleyball team represents Bhutan in international volleyball competitions. It is managed by the Bhutan Volleyball Federation.

The national team of Bhutan first competed in the South Asian Games. Tournaments are conducted at the Changlimithang Stadium in Thimphu.
