= Nepal Volleyball Association =

Sports governing body in Nepal

- Sport: Volleyball
- Jurisdiction: Nepal
- Abbreviation: NVA
- Founded: 1976; 50 years ago
- Affiliation: FIVB
- Regional affiliation: AVC
- Headquarters: Kathmandu, Nepal
- President: Jitendra Bahadur Chand
- Secretary: Roshan Shrestha

Official website
- www.volleyballassociation.org.np
- (Nepal)

The Nepal Volleyball Association (NVA) is a national non-governmental, nonprofit sports organization in the Nepal. It represents Nepal in the Fédération Internationale de Volleyball and the Asian Volleyball Confederation, as well as the volleyball sports in the National Sports Council (Nepal).

The NVA also runs annually domestic Volleyball league competition called Prime Minister Cup NVA Volleyball League.

== National teams ==
For details please refer to main articles for dedicated teams.

Men's

- Nepal men's national volleyball team
- Under-21
- Under-19
- Under-17

Women's

- Nepal women's national volleyball team
- Under-21
- Under-19
- Under-17

== Affiliated Province Volleyball Associations ==
Province Association	Province	Affiliate District Association	President
Bagmati Province Volleyball Association	Bagmati Province	Dhading District Volleyball Association; Dolakha District Volleyball Association; Kathmandu District Volleyball Association; Kavre District Volleyball Association; Lalitpur District Volleyball Association; Makwanpur District Volleyball Association; Nuwakot District Volleyball Association; Ramechhap District Volleyball Association; Rasuwa District Volleyball Association; Sindhupalchok District Volleyball Association; Sindhuli District Volleyball Association	
Gandaki Province Volleyball Association	Gandaki Province	Baglung District Volleyball Association; Gorkha District Volleyball Association; Kaski District Volleyball Association; Lamjung District Volleyball Association; Manang District Volleyball Association; Mustang District Volleyball Association; Myagdi District Volleyball Association; Nawalpur District Volleyball Association; Parbat District Volleyball Association; Syangja District Volleyball Association; Tanahun District Volleyball Association	Nabin Gurung
Karnali Province Volleybal Association	Karnali Province	Dailekh District Volleyball Association; Dolpa District Volleyball Association; Humla District Volleyball Association; Jajarkot District Volleyball Association; Jumla District Volleyball Association; Kalikot District Volleyball Association; Mugu District Volleyball Association; Rukum West District Volleyball Association; Salyan District Volleyball Association; Surkhet District Volleyball Association	Krishna Shrestha
Koshi Province Volleyball Association	Koshi Province		
Lumbini Province Volleyball Association	Lumbini Province		
Madhesh Province Volleyball Association	Madhesh Province		
Sudurpashchim Province Volleyball Association	Sudurpashchim Province		

== Competitions ==
=== Current title holders ===
Competition	Year	Champions	Title	Next edition
Senior (men's)
National Games	2022	APF Club	National Games Champion	2024
National Volleyball Championship	2023–24	Nepal Police	National Volleyball Champion	2024–25
PM Cup NVA Volleyball League	2025	Help Nepal V.C.	PM Cup NVA Champion (Men's)	2026
NVA Club Volleyball Championship	2024-25	Help Nepal V.C.	NVA Club Champion (Men's)	2025-26
National Beach Volleyball Tournament, Sukute	2025	Chandra & Safal B.K (Nepal Police V.C.)	National Beach Volleyball Champion (Men's)	TBD
Nepal Volleyball League (NVL)	2025	Annapurna Spiker Kings	NVL Champion	2026
Senior (women's)
National Games	2022	APF Club	National Games Champion	2024
National Volleyball Championship	2025	Nepal Police	National Volleyball Champion	2026
PM Cup NVA Volleyball League	2025	Nepal Police	PM Cup NVA Champion (Women's)	2026
NVA Club Volleyball Championship	2024-25	APF Club	NVA Club Champion (Women's)	2025-26
National Beach Volleyball Tournament, Sukute	2025	Kamala Pun & Manisha Chaudhary (Nepal Police V.C.)	National Beach Volleyball Champion (Women's)	TBD
Everest Women's Volleyball League (EWVL)	2024	Karnali Yashvis	EWVL Champion	2025
Youth (men's)
Sahana Pradhan U19 National Volleyball Championship	2024-25	Gandaki Province	U19 National Volleyball Champion	2025-26
Youth (women's)
Sahana Pradhan U19 National Volleyball Championship	2024-25	Bagmati Province	U19 National Volleyball Champion	2025-26

=== Major Local Tournaments ===
- Tiger Volleyball club Championship, Pokhara
- Dhorpatan Volleyball League
- Lamachaur Cup Volleyball Tournament

== See also ==
- Volleyball in Nepal
- PM Cup NVA Volleyball League
- Everest Women's Volleyball League
