= Asian Volleyball Confederation =

International sports governing body

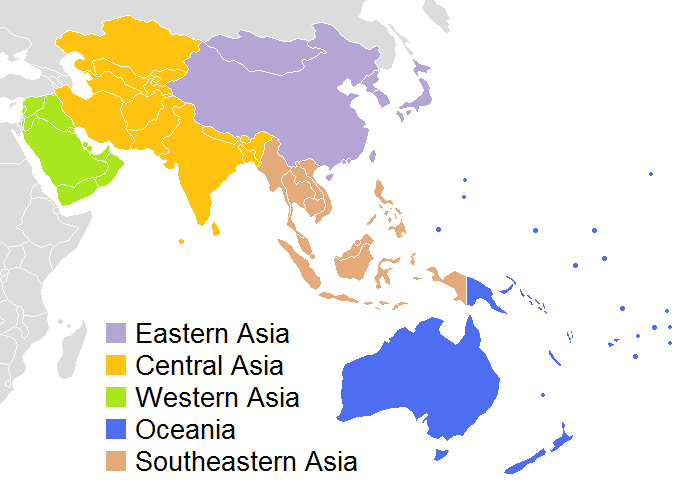
- Abbreviation: AVC
- Formation: 1952; 74 years ago
- Type: Sports organisation
- Headquarters: Bangkok, Thailand
- Region served: Asia and Oceania
- Members: 65 national federations
- Official language: English
- President: (Philippines) Ramon Suzara
- Senior vice-president: Craig Carracher
- Vice-presidents: Mohamed Latheef (CAVA); Yuan Lei (EAVA); Hugh Graham (OZVA); Heyzer Harsono (SAVA); Ali Ghanim Al-Kuwari (WAVA)
- Secretary general: Hugh Graham
- Parent organization: FIVB
- Subsidiaries: CAVA (Central Asia and South Asia); EAVA (East Asia); OZVA (Oceania); SAVA (Southeast Asia); WAVA (West Asia)
- Website: asianvolleyball.net

The Asian Volleyball Confederation (AVC) is one of five continental governing bodies in volleyball. It governs indoor volleyball, beach volleyball, and other disciplines in Asia and Oceania, excluding the transcontinental countries of Azerbaijan, Georgia, Russia, and Turkey, as well as the West Asian countries of Armenia, Cyprus, and Israel. The AVC consists of 65 national association members.

The AVC consists of the national volleyball federations of Asia and Oceania, and club competitions including the Asian Championships, Cup, and Champions League, and also controls the prize money, regulations, as well as media rights to those competitions.

Masaichi Nishikawa acted as the first president. The current president is Ramon Suzara, a Philippine National Volleyball Federation president, who was elected as AVC's ninth president at the 25th AVC General Assembly in Bangkok in August 2024.

== History ==
After William G. Morgan, the physical education director of the YMCA in Massachusetts, United States, invented the sport of volleyball in 1895, ten years later, in the early 1900s, the YMCA began spreading the sport to Asian countries such as Qing dynasty, Empire of Japan, the Philippine Islands, and British Raj.

Later, in 1913, volleyball was included in the Far Eastern Games held in Manila, Philippine Islands, which is considered the first international volleyball competition in the world. AVC was established in 1952, four years after the founding of the FIVB, following an initiative by Masaichi Nishikawa, then President of the Japan Volleyball Association.

Asia has become one of the most important continents in the world of volleyball, as it has the largest number of member federations and enjoys widespread popularity of the sport. The continent has also hosted many major international volleyball events — most notably, the 1964 Summer Olympics in Tokyo, Japan, which marked the debut of volleyball in the Olympic Games. In that historic event, the Japanese women's team won the first-ever Olympic gold medal in volleyball.

In September 2025, the AVC House was inaugurated in Bangkok.

== Presidents ==
No.	President	Nationality	Term
1	Masaichi Nishikawa	Japan	1952–1976
2	Nemesio Yabut	Philippines	1976–1979
3	Yutaka Maeda	Japan	1979–1985
4	Yasutaka Matsudaira	Japan	1985–1996
5	Yuan Weimin	China	1997–2001
6	Wei Jizhong (Note: Wei Jizhong served as the third FIVB president from 2008 to 2012.)	China	2001–2008
7	Saleh Ahmad Bin Nasser	Saudi Arabia	2008–2020
8	Rita Subowo	Indonesia	2020–2024
9	Ramon Suzara	Philippines	2024–present

== Board of administration ==
Designation	Name	Nationality	Note
President	Ramon Suzara	Philippines	FIVB executive vice-president
Senior vice-president	Craig Carracher	Australia	FIVB board of administration member
Executive vice-president	Mohamed Latheef	Maldives	
Zonal executive vice-president	Mohamed Latheef	Maldives	CAVA president
Zonal executive vice-president	Yuan Lei	China	EAVA president, FIVB board of administration member
Zonal executive vice-president	Hugh Graham	Cook Islands	OZVA president, FIVB executive vice-president
Zonal executive vice-president	Heyzer Harsono	Indonesia	SAVA president
Zonal executive vice-president	Ali Ghanim Al-Kuwari	Qatar	WAVA president, FIVB board of administration member
Female executive member	Fong Sok Van Alice Oliver	Macau	
Female executive member	Hila Asanuma	Palau	FIVB executive vice-president
Secretary general	Hugh Graham	Cook Islands	
Treasurer	Marina Tsui	Hong Kong	
Executive director	Shanrit Wongprasert	Thailand	AVC lifetime honorary vice-president
Board of administration member	Mohammed bin Khalifa Al-khalifa	Bahrain	
Board of administration member	Seyed Milad Taghavi	Iran	
Board of administration member	Shunichi Kawai	Japan	
Board of administration member	Princess Ayah bint Faisal	Jordan	FIVB board of administration member
Board of administration member	Kylychbek Sarbaghyshev	Kyrgyzstan	
Board of administration member	Terry Sasser	Marshall Islands	
Board of administration member	Jitendra Bahadur Chand	Nepal	
Board of administration member	Ibrahim bin Abdulla Al-muqbali	Oman	
Board of administration member	Huang Kuo Kuang	Chinese Taipei	
Board of administration member	Thiti Pluckchaoom	Thailand	FIVB board of administration member
Board of administration member	Trần Đức Phấn	Vietnam	

== Committees ==
Committee	President	Nationality
Sports events council	Kylychbek Sarbaghyshev	Kyrgyzstan
Referees committee	Dean Edward Turner Oam	Australia
Coaches committee	Feng Kun	China
Development and marketing committee	Seong Keehak	South Korea
Finance committee	Terry Sasser	Marshall Islands
Medical committee	Oh Jae-Keun	South Korea
Beach volleyball committee	Craig Carracher	Australia

== National federations ==
=== CAVA (Central Asia and South Asia) ===
Code	Federation	National teams	Founded	FIVB affiliation	AVC affiliation	IOC member
AFG	Afghanistan	Men's; U23; U21; U19; U17; Women's; U23; U21; U19; U17				Yes
BAN	Bangladesh	Men's; U23; U21; U19; U17; Women's; U23; U21; U19; U17				Yes
BHU	Bhutan	Men's; U23; U21; U19; U17; Women's; U23; U21; U19; U17	1973			Yes
IND	India	Men's; U23; U21; U19; U17; Women's; U23; U21; U19; U17	1951			Yes
IRI	Iran	Men's; U23; U21; U19; U17; Women's; U23; U21; U19; U17	1945	1959		Yes
KAZ	Kazakhstan	Men's; U23; U21; U19; U17; Women's; U23; U21; U19; U17				Yes
KGZ	Kyrgyzstan	Men's; U23; U21; U19; U17; Women's; U23; U21; U19; U17				Yes
MDV	Maldives	Men's; U23; U21; U19; U17; Women's; U23; U21; U19; U17				Yes
NEP	Nepal	Men's; U23; U21; U19; U17; Women's; U23; U21; U19; U17				Yes
PAK	Pakistan	Men's; U23; U21; U19; U17; Women's; U23; U21; U19; U17	1955			Yes
SRI	Sri Lanka	Men's; U23; U21; U19; U17; Women's; U23; U21; U19; U17	1951			Yes
TJK	Tajikistan	Men's; U23; U21; U19; U17; Women's; U23; U21; U19; U17				Yes
TKM	Turkmenistan	Men's; U23; U21; U19; U17; Women's; U23; U21; U19; U17				Yes
UZB	Uzbekistan	Men's; U23; U21; U19; U17; Women's; U23; U21; U19; U17				Yes

=== EAVA (East Asia) ===
Code	Federation	National teams	Founded	FIVB affiliation	AVC affiliation	IOC member
CHN	China	Men's; U23; U21; U19; U17; Women's; U23; U21; U19; U17	1953	1954		Yes
TPE	Chinese Taipei	Men's; U23; U21; U19; U17; Women's; U23; U21; U19; U17	1954			Yes
HKG	Hong Kong	Men's; U23; U21; U19; U17; Women's; U23; U21; U19; U17				Yes
JPN	Japan	Men's; U23; U21; U19; U17; Women's; U23; U21; U19; U17	1927	1951	1952	Yes
MAC	Macau	Men's; U23; U21; U19; U17; Women's; U23; U21; U19; U17				No
MGL	Mongolia	Men's; U23; U21; U19; U17; Women's; U23; U21; U19; U17				Yes
PRK	North Korea	Men's; U23; U21; U19; U17; Women's; U23; U21; U19; U17				Yes
KOR	South Korea	Men's; U23; U21; U19; U17; Women's; U23; U21; U19; U17	1946	1959		Yes

=== OZVA (Oceania) ===
Code	Federation	National teams	Founded	FIVB affiliation	AVC affiliation	IOC member
ASA	American Samoa	Men's; U23; U21; U19; U17; Women's; U23; U21; U19; U17				Yes
AUS	Australia	Men's; U23; U21; U19; U17; Women's; U23; U21; U19; U17	1963			Yes
COK	Cook Islands	Men's; U23; U21; U19; U17; Women's; U23; U21; U19; U17				Yes
FIJ	Fiji	Men's; U23; U21; U19; U17; Women's; U23; U21; U19; U17				Yes
PYF	French Polynesia	Men's; U23; U21; U19; U17; Women's; U23; U21; U19; U17				No
GUM	Guam	Men's; U23; U21; U19; U17; Women's; U23; U21; U19; U17				Yes
KIR	Kiribati	Men's; U23; U21; U19; U17; Women's; U23; U21; U19; U17				Yes
MSH	Marshall Islands	Men's; U23; U21; U19; U17; Women's; U23; U21; U19; U17				Yes
FSM	Federated States of Micronesia	Men's; U23; U21; U19; U17; Women's; U23; U21; U19; U17				Yes
NZL	New Zealand	Men's; U23; U21; U19; U17; Women's; U23; U21; U19; U17				Yes
NIU	Niue	Men's; U23; U21; U19; U17; Women's; U23; U21; U19; U17				No
NMI	Northern Mariana Islands	Men's; U23; U21; U19; U17; Women's; U23; U21; U19; U17				No
PAU	Palau	Men's; U23; U21; U19; U17; Women's; U23; U21; U19; U17				Yes
PNG	Papua New Guinea	Men's; U23; U21; U19; U17; Women's; U23; U21; U19; U17				Yes
SAM	Samoa	Men's; U23; U21; U19; U17; Women's; U23; U21; U19; U17				Yes
SOL	Solomon Islands	Men's; U23; U21; U19; U17; Women's; U23; U21; U19; U17				Yes
TGA	Tonga	Men's; U23; U21; U19; U17; Women's; U23; U21; U19; U17				Yes
TUV	Tuvalu	Men's; U23; U21; U19; U17; Women's; U23; U21; U19; U17				Yes
VAN	Vanuatu	Men's; U23; U21; U19; U17; Women's; U23; U21; U19; U17				Yes

=== SAVA (Southeast Asia) ===
Code	Federation	National teams	Founded	FIVB affiliation	AVC affiliation	IOC member
BRU	Brunei	Men's; U23; U21; U19; U17; Women's; U23; U21; U19; U17				Yes
CAM	Cambodia	Men's; U23; U21; U19; U17; Women's; U23; U21; U19; U17				Yes
INA	Indonesia	Men's; U23; U21; U19; U17; Women's; U23; U21; U19; U17	1955			Yes
LAO	Laos	Men's; U23; U21; U19; U17; Women's; U23; U21; U19; U17				Yes
MAS	Malaysia	Men's; U23; U21; U19; U17; Women's; U23; U21; U19; U17				Yes
MYA	Myanmar	Men's; U23; U21; U19; U17; Women's; U23; U21; U19; U17				Yes
PHI	Philippines	Men's; U23; U21; U19; U17; Women's; U23; U21; U19; U17	2021	2021	2021	Yes
SIN	Singapore	Men's; U23; U21; U19; U17; Women's; U23; U21; U19; U17				Yes
THA	Thailand	Men's; U23; U21; U19; U17; Women's; U23; U21; U19; U17	1959			Yes
TLS	Timor-Leste	Men's; U23; U21; U19; U17; Women's; U23; U21; U19; U17				Yes
VIE	Vietnam	Men's; U23; U21; U19; U17; Women's; U23; U21; U19; U17	1961	1991	1991	Yes

=== WAVA (West Asia) ===
Code	Federation	National teams	Founded	FIVB affiliation	AVC affiliation	IOC member
BRN	Bahrain	Men's; U23; U21; U19; U17; Women's; U23; U21; U19; U17	1976	1976		Yes
IRQ	Iraq	Men's; U23; U21; U19; U17; Women's; U23; U21; U19; U17	1959	1959		Yes
JOR	Jordan	Men's; U23; U21; U19; U17; Women's; U23; U21; U19; U17	1961	1971		Yes
KUW	Kuwait	Men's; U23; U21; U19; U17; Women's; U23; U21; U19; U17				Yes
LBN	Lebanon	Men's; U23; U21; U19; U17; Women's; U23; U21; U19; U17	1949	1949		Yes
OMA	Oman	Men's; U23; U21; U19; U17; Women's; U23; U21; U19; U17				Yes
PLE	Palestine	Men's; U23; U21; U19; U17; Women's; U23; U21; U19; U17				Yes
QAT	Qatar	Men's; U23; U21; U19; U17; Women's; U23; U21; U19; U17				Yes
KSA	Saudi Arabia	Men's; U23; U21; U19; U17; Women's; U23; U21; U19; U17				Yes
SYR	Syria	Men's; U23; U21; U19; U17; Women's; U23; U21; U19; U17				Yes
UAE	United Arab Emirates	Men's; U23; U21; U19; U17; Women's; U23; U21; U19; U17				Yes
YEM	Yemen	Men's; U23; U21; U19; U17; Women's; U23; U21; U19; U17	1976	1976		Yes

== FIVB World Rankings ==
=== Top-ranked men's national teams ===
Top ranked CAVB Men's Teams as of 15 October 2026
AVC	Rank	Change	Team	Points
1	5	Steady	Japan	352.7
2	19	Steady	Iran	224.7
3	25	Steady	South Korea	163.1
4	34	Steady	China	134.53
5	39	▲2	Bahrain	126.81
6	40	▼1	Pakistan	125.42
7	42	Steady	Australia	121.75
8	44	Steady	Qatar	120.64
9	46	Steady	Indonesia	112.92
10	48	▼3	India	103.98
11	52	▲7	Thailand	96.8
12	54	▲8	Chinese Taipei	88.92
13	58	Steady	Vietnam	82.42
14	65	▼4	Oman	71.09
15	70	Steady	Turkmenistan	63.93
16	71	Steady	Kyrgyzstan	63
17	73	Steady	Kazakhstan	61.9
18	75	▲6	Saudi Arabia	59.48
19	76	▲9	United Arab Emirates	58.47
20	81	▼1	Bangladesh	54.47
21	90	Steady	Sri Lanka	48.18
22	92	Steady	Philippines	46.19
23	93	Steady	Kuwait	46.03
24	94	Steady	Jordan	45.6
25	99	Steady	Iraq	43.98
26	103	Steady	Macau	31.87
27	104	Steady	Hong Kong	31.08
28	107	Steady	Mongolia	27.83
29	112	Steady	Uzbekistan	26.15
30	117	Steady	Lebanon	19
31	123	Steady	Cambodia	14.25
32	125	Steady	New Zealand	12.66
33	126	Steady	Guam	11.38
34	127	Steady	Papua New Guinea	10.27
35	137	Steady	Cook Islands	1.22
*Change from 1 October 2026
Complete rankings at volleyballworld.com

=== Top-ranked women's national teams ===
Top ranked AVC Women's Teams as of 2 October 2026
AVC	Rank	Change	Team	Points
1	6	▼1	Japan	337.16
2	7	▼1	China	324.9
3	13	▲5	Thailand	244.01
4	28	▲11	South Korea	156
5	33	▼5	Vietnam	140.91
6	38	▼1	Chinese Taipei	125.23
7	40	▲4	Iran	120.75
8	44	▼9	Kazakhstan	113.84
9	51	▲23	Indonesia	87.24
10	56	▼9	Philippines	80.17
11	64	Steady	India	62.77
12	73	▼1	Singapore	53.17
13	85	▼9	Australia	37.68
14	87	▼24	Kyrgyzstan	36.43
15	88	▼10	Macau	36
16	93	▼5	Tajikistan	33.14
17	97	▼12	Hong Kong	25.04
18	99	▼6	Mongolia	22.55
19	100	Steady	Mongolia	21.61
20	108	▼16	Uzbekistan	15.23
*Change from 24 May 2026
Complete rankings at volleyballworld.com

== Competitions ==
=== Volleyball ===
National teams:

Men

- AVC Men's Volleyball Continental Championship
- AVC Men's Volleyball Cup
- AVC Men's U20 Volleyball Championship
- AVC Boys' U18 Volleyball Championship
- AVC Boys' U16 Volleyball Championship

Women

- AVC Women's Volleyball Continental Championship
- AVC Women's Volleyball Cup
- AVC Women's U20 Volleyball Championship
- AVC Girls' U18 Volleyball Championship
- AVC Girls' U16 Volleyball Championship

Defunct:

Men

- AVC Cup for Men
- AVC Men's Olympic Volleyball Qualification
- AVC Men's Volleyball World Championship Qualification
- Asian Men's U23 Volleyball Championship

Women

- AVC Cup for Women
- AVC Women's Olympic Volleyball Qualification
- AVC Women's Volleyball World Championship Qualification
- Asian Women's U23 Volleyball Championship

Clubs:

Men

- AVC Men's Volleyball Champions League

Women

- AVC Women's Volleyball Champions League

=== Beach volleyball ===
National teams:

- AVC Beach Volleyball Continental Championships
- AVC Beach Volleyball Continental Cup
- AVC U21 Beach Volleyball Championships
- AVC U19 Beach Volleyball Championships

Professional tours:

- AVC Beach Volleyball Tour

== Title holders ==
=== Volleyball ===
	Championship	Cup	U–20	U–18	U–16	Champions League
Men	Japan (2026)	Indonesia (2026)	Iran (2024)	Iran (2026)	Pakistan (2025)	(Indonesia) Jakarta Bhayangkara Presisi (2026)
Women	Thailand (2026)	South Korea (2026)	China (2024)	China (2026)	South Korea (2025)	(Japan) NEC Red Rockets (2026)

=== Beach volleyball ===
	Championship	U–21	U–19
Men	M. Nicolaidis / I. Carracher; Australia (2026)	V. Mastikhin / K. Ryukhov; Kazakhstan (2025)	K.H. Akbarzadeh / A.A. Ghalehnovi; Iran (2024)
Women	S. Fejes / T. Clancy; Australia (2026)	K. Y. Jiang / M. L. Zhou; China (2025)	J. Rayner / C. Zajer; Australia (2024)

== See also ==
- African Volleyball Confederation (CAVB)
- European Volleyball Confederation (CEV)
- North, Central America and Caribbean Volleyball Confederation (NORCECA)
- South American Volleyball Confederation (CSV)
