= Bangladesh women's national under-19 volleyball team =

Youth volleyball team representing Bangladesh

Bangladesh U-19
- Association: Bangladesh Volleyball Federation
- Confederation: AVC
- Head coach: Md Shamim Dewan
- FIVB ranking: NR (2 October 2026)

Uniforms
| Home | Away |

Summer Olympics
- Appearances: None

World Championship
- Appearances: No Appearances

AVC U-18 Asian Championship
- Appearances: No Appearances

The Bangladesh women's national under-19 volleyball team represents Bangladesh in women's under-19 volleyball events, it is controlled and managed by the Bangladesh Volleyball Federation that is a member of Asian volleyball body Asian Volleyball Confederation (AVC) and the international volleyball body government the Fédération Internationale de Volleyball (FIVB).

== Competitions history ==
=== Summer Youth Olympics ===
Champions Runners up Third place Fourth place

Youth Olympic Games records
| Year | Round | Position | Pld | W | L | SW | SL | Squad |
|---|---|---|---|---|---|---|---|---|
| (Singapore) 2010 | Didn't Qualify | | | | | | | |
| (China) 2014 | No Volleyball Event | | | | | | | |
| (Argentina) 2018 | No Volleyball Event | | | | | | | |
| Total | 0 Title | 0/1 | 0 | 0 | 0 | 0 | 0 | — |

=== FIVB U-19 World Championship ===
Champions Runners up Third place Fourth place

FIVB U-19 World Championship records
| Year | Round | Position | Pld | W | L | SW | SL | Squad |
|---|---|---|---|---|---|---|---|---|
| (Brazil) 1989 | Didn't Qualify | | | | | | | |
| (Portugal) 1991 | Didn't Qualify | | | | | | | |
| (Czechoslovakia) 1993 | Didn't Qualify | | | | | | | |
| (France) 1995 | Didn't Qualify | | | | | | | |
| (Thailand) 1997 | Didn't Qualify | | | | | | | |
| (Portugal) 1999 | Didn't Qualify | | | | | | | |
| (Croatia) 2001 | Didn't Qualify | | | | | | | |
| (Poland) 2003 | Didn't Qualify | | | | | | | |
| (Macau) 2005 | Didn't Qualify | | | | | | | |
| (Mexico) 2007 | Didn't Qualify | | | | | | | |
| (Thailand) 2009 | Didn't Qualify | | | | | | | |
| (Turkey) 2011 | Didn't Qualify | | | | | | | |
| (Thailand) 2013 | Didn't Qualify | | | | | | | |
| (Peru) 2015 | Didn't Qualify | | | | | | | |
| (Argentina) 2017 | Didn't Qualify | | | | | | | |
| (Egypt) 2019 | Didn't Qualify | | | | | | | |
| (Mexico) 2021 | Didn't Qualify | | | | | | | |
| (Croatia) (Hungary) 2023 | Didn't Qualify | | | | | | | |
| Total | 0 Title | 0/18 | 0 | 0 | 0 | 0 | 0 | — |
