= Yasutaka Matsudaira =

Japanese volleyball coach (1930 - 2011)

Personal information
- Native name: 松平康隆
- Nationality: Japanese
- Born: 22 January 1930 Tokyo, Japan
- Died: 31 December 2011 (aged 81) Tokyo, Japan
- Occupations: coach, player

Sport
- Sport: Volleyball

Yasutaka Matsudaira (22 January 1930 – 31 December 2011) was a volleyball player, coach, and sports official. He was the coach of Japan men's national volleyball team from 1965–1972 and the first Japanese to enter the International Volleyball Hall of Fame. Matsudaira was also previously a captain for Keio University.

== Early life ==
Matsudaira was born on January 22, 1930, in Ebara Ward, Tokyo. (currently Shinagawa Ward, Tokyo.) Matsudaira was a former feudal retainer, and served as a chief retainer, and was a descendant of the Daini Matsudaira family, who served as the lord of Komatsu Castle for several years at the end of the Edo period.

== Volleyball ==
=== Playing career ===
In 1947, he entered the Department of Political Science, Faculty of Law, Keio University. As the captain of the volleyball team, he won the All Japan 9-man Championship in 1951 and won the Emperor's Cup (the first student team after the war).

Matsudaira began as a player in 1942.

In 1952, he graduated from Keio University (with a law degree) and joined Nippon Kokan in 1952, where he played an active role as a player, manager and captain (his position was back center). In 1954, he entered Japan as a nine-a-side player.

=== Coaching ===
He retired from playing in 1961, and went to the Soviet Union to study six-a-side volleyball. After returning to Japan, he became the coach of the Japanese men's volleyball team in 1965.

Matsudaira later won a gold medal as the Captain for the Japanese Team at the 1961 Asian Games, and at the 19th Summer Olympic Games in Mexico in 1968, he won the silver medal. Later, at the 20th Summer Olympic Games in Munich in 1972, he led the team to the gold medal after a big turnaround in the semi-finals. He continued to work for Nippon Kokan.

In 1979, he was appointed Executive Director of the Japan Volleyball Association, and served as General Manager of the 1980 Moscow Olympic World Final Qualifiers. In the same year, he became president of the Asian Volleyball Federation.

From 1989 to December 1995, served as president of the Japan Volleyball Association. As the chairman, he worked hard to spread volleyball among young people, such as the establishment of the V League on the premise of becoming a professional in the future.

In 1998, he became the first Japanese person to be inducted into the Volleyball Hall of Fame. After that, he served as vice-president and director of the Japanese Olympic Committee (JOC) and first vice-president of the International Volleyball Federation (FIVB), and was also a candidate for president at the JOC.

He went to South American countries such as Brazil and Argentina in parallel with his duties for the Japan Association, and taught volleyball there. The Japanese team was forced to struggle on the international stage, leading to the inability to win at international competitions.

In March 2000, he left Nippon Kokan.

In 2001, he returned to the Japan Volleyball Association, and in February 2011, he was appointed honorary advisor.

== Death ==
At 12:21 am, on December 31, 2011, he died of emphysema at a hospital in Tokyo. He died at the age of 81. After his death he was awarded the rank of Shogoi. His grave is at Tama Cemetery in Tokyo.
