= Bangladesh Volleyball Federation =

Sports governing body

- Sport: Volleyball
- Jurisdiction: Bangladesh
- Abbreviation: BVF
- Founded: 1973; 53 years ago
- Affiliation: FIVB
- Regional affiliation: AVC
- Headquarters: Dhaka, Bangladesh
- President: Faruque Hassan
- Secretary: Bimal Ghosh Bhulu

Official website
- bvf.com.bd
- (Bangladesh)

The Bangladesh Volleyball Federation is the national federation for volleyball and is responsible for governing the sport in Bangladesh. Mr. Faruque Hassan is the president and Bimal Ghosh Bhulu is the general secretary of the federation (Ad Hoc Committee) 2025.

The federation also runs many national and international tournaments.

== History ==
Bangladesh Volleyball Federation was established in 1973 by the Government of Bangladesh. Since its founding, the federation has held national volleyball tournaments for both, men and women.

== National teams ==
For details please refer to main articles for dedicated teams.

Men's

- Bangladesh men's national volleyball team
- Under-21
- Under-19
- Under-17

Women's

- Bangladesh women's national volleyball team
- Under-21
- Under-19
- Under-17

== National Tournaments ==
Tournament	Year	Sponsor	Winner	Runner's up
Victory Day	2022	Walton		
Independence Day	2022	Walton		

== International Tournaments ==
Tournaments	Year	Winner	Runner's up
Bangabandhu Volleyball Championship	2016	Winner	
Bangabandhu Volleyball Championship	2018		Runner up
Bangamata Volleyball Championship	2019		
Bangabandhu Volleyball Championship	2021		Runner up
Bangamata Volleyball Championship	2021		
Bangabandhu U23 Volleyball Championship	2022	Winner	
Bangabandhu CAVA International Beach Volleyball Championship Men's and Women's	2022		Runner up
Bangabandhu AVC Beach Continental Cup Phase 1 Olympic Qualification Men's and Women's	2023		
Bangabandhu CAVA International Beach Volleyball Championship Men's and Women's	2023		Runner up

! ! |-
