= Girls' U19 NORCECA Continental Championship =

- Current season, competition or edition: 2026 Girls U19 NORCECA Continental Championship
- Sport: Volleyball
- Founded: 1998
- Continent: NORCECA
- Most recent champion: United States (10th title)
- Most titles: United States (10 titles)

The Girls U19 NORCECA Continental Championship is a sport competition for national volleyball teams, currently held biannually and organized by the NORCECA, the North America, Central America and Caribbean volleyball federation. The competition is played by girls' under-19 teams.

== Summary ==
NORCECA Championship
Year	Host	Gold	Silver	Bronze
1998; Details	Puerto Rico	United States	Puerto Rico	Canada
2000; Details	Dominican Republic	Puerto Rico	United States	Dominican Republic
2002; Details	United States	United States	Dominican Republic	Puerto Rico
2004; Details	Puerto Rico	United States	Puerto Rico	Mexico
2006; Details	United States	United States	Dominican Republic	Puerto Rico
2008; Details	Puerto Rico	United States	Mexico	Dominican Republic
2010; Details	Guatemala	United States	Mexico	Puerto Rico
2012; Details	Mexico	United States	Dominican Republic	Mexico
2014; Details	Costa Rica	Dominican Republic	United States	Mexico
2016; Details	Puerto Rico	Dominican Republic	United States	Mexico
2018; Details	Honduras	United States	Canada	Cuba
2024; Details	Honduras	United States	Canada	Puerto Rico
2026; Details	Costa Rica	United States	Canada	Mexico

== Medal table ==
Rank	Nation	Gold	Silver	Bronze	Total
1	United States	10	3	0	13
2	Dominican Republic	2	3	2	7
3	Puerto Rico	1	2	4	7
4	Canada	0	3	1	4
5	Mexico	0	2	5	7
6	Cuba	0	0	1	1
Totals (6 entries)		13	13	13	39

== See also ==
- Boys' Youth NORCECA Volleyball Championship
