= 2026 Girls U19 NORCECA Continental Championship =

Tournament details
- Host country: Costa Rica
- City: San José
- Dates: 17–25 July
- Teams: 8 (from 1 confederation)
- Venue: 1 (in 1 host city)

Final positions
- Champions: United States (10th title)
- Runners-up: Canada
- Third place: Mexico

Tournament awards
- MVP: Cala Haffner (USA)

The 2026 Girls U19 NORCECA Continental Championship was the 13th edition of the Girls' Youth NORCECA Volleyball Championship, a biennial international volleyball tournament organised by the North, Central America and Caribbean Volleyball Confederation (NORCECA) for women's U18 national teams in the region. The tournament will take place from 17 to 25 July.

Costa Rica was awarded the hosting rights, with San José as the host city. This will be Costa Rica's second time hosting after 2014.

This tournament served as the qualification tournament for the FIVB Volleyball Girls' U19 World Championship. The top four teams of the tournament qualified for the 2027 FIVB Volleyball Girls' U19 World Championship as the NORCECA representatives.

United States are the two-time defending champions, most recently beating Canada 3–1 at the final in Tegucigalpa.

The United States won their third straight and tenth overall title, after defeated Canada 3–0 in the final. Cala Haffner of the United States won the Most Valuable Player award.

== Host selection ==
Costa Rica was awarded the hosting rights, with San José as the host city. This will be Costa Rica's second time hosting after 2014.

== Preliminary round ==
=== Group A ===
Pos	Team	Pld	W	L	Pts	SW	SL	SR	SPW	SPL	SPR	Qualification
1	United States	2	2	0	10	6	0	MAX	150	92	1.630	Semifinals
2	Dominican Republic	2	1	1	4	3	4	0.750	146	154	0.948	Quarterfinals
3	Cuba	2	0	2	1	1	6	0.167	121	171	0.708	

Date	Time		Score		Set 1	Set 2	Set 3	Set 4	Set 5	Total	Report
19 July	15:30	United States	3–0	Cuba	25–16	25–16	25–10			75–42	
20 July	17:30	Dominican Republic	3–1	Cuba	25–19	25–13	21–25	25–22		96–79	
21 July	15:30	United States	3–0	Dominican Republic	25–18	25–18	25–14			75–50	

=== Group B ===
Pos	Team	Pld	W	L	Pts	SW	SL	SR	SPW	SPL	SPR	Qualification
1	Mexico	2	2	0	9	6	1	6.000	177	139	1.273	Semifinals
2	Puerto Rico	2	1	1	5	4	4	1.000	182	173	1.052	Quarterfinals
3	U.S. Virgin Islands	2	0	2	1	1	6	0.167	124	171	0.725	

Date	Time		Score		Set 1	Set 2	Set 3	Set 4	Set 5	Total	Report
19 July	17:30	Mexico	3–0	U.S. Virgin Islands	25–22	25–16	25–15			75–53	
20 July	15:30	Puerto Rico	3–1	U.S. Virgin Islands	25–14	21–25	25–17	25–15		96–71	
21 July	17:30	Mexico	3–1	Puerto Rico	25–17	27–25	25–27	25–17		102–86	

=== Group C ===
Pos	Team	Pld	W	L	Pts	SW	SL	SR	SPW	SPL	SPR	Qualification
1	Canada	2	2	0	10	6	0	MAX	150	77	1.948	Semifinals
2	Costa Rica	2	1	1	5	3	3	1.000	123	116	1.060	Quarterfinals
3	Jamaica	2	0	2	0	0	6	0.000	70	150	0.467	

Date	Time		Score		Set 1	Set 2	Set 3	Set 4	Set 5	Total	Report
19 July	19:30	Costa Rica	3–0	Jamaica	25–11	25–15	25–15			75–41	
20 July	19:30	Canada	3–0	Jamaica	25–8	25–11	25–10			75–29	
21 July	19:30	Costa Rica	0–3	Canada	21–25	14–25	13–25			48–75	

== Bracket ==
Quarterfinals
C2	Costa Rica	0
B2	Puerto Rico	3
A2	Dominican Republic	2
B1	Mexico	3

Semifinals
A1	United States	3
B2	Puerto Rico	0
C1	Canada	3
B1	Mexico	0

Final
A1	United States	3
C1	Canada	0
Third place
B2	Puerto Rico	1
B1	Mexico	3

== 9th place game ==
Date	Time		Score		Set 1	Set 2	Set 3	Set 4	Set 5	Total	Report
22 July	15:30	Cuba	3–0	Jamaica	25–9	25–7	25–10			75–26	

== Quarterfinals ==
Date	Time		Score		Set 1	Set 2	Set 3	Set 4	Set 5	Total	Report
22 July	19:30	Costa Rica	0–3	Puerto Rico	14–25	16–25	23–25			53–75	
22 July	17:30	Mexico	3–2	Dominican Republic	25–15	21–25	25–16	18–25	15–9	104–90	

== 7th place game ==
Date	Time		Score		Set 1	Set 2	Set 3	Set 4	Set 5	Total	Report
23 July	15:30	U.S. Virgin Islands	1–3	Cuba	13–25	16–25	25–22	25–27		79–99	

== Semifinals ==
Date	Time		Score		Set 1	Set 2	Set 3	Set 4	Set 5	Total	Report
23 July	17:30	United States	3–0	Puerto Rico	25–16	25–12	25–10			75–38	
23 July	19:30	Canada	3–0	Mexico	25–20	26–24	25–18			76–62	

== 5th place game ==
Date	Time		Score		Set 1	Set 2	Set 3	Set 4	Set 5	Total	Report
24 July	12:00	Costa Rica	0–3	Dominican Republic	11–25	19–25	13–25			43–75	

== Third place game ==
Date	Time		Score		Set 1	Set 2	Set 3	Set 4	Set 5	Total	Report
24 July	14:00	Puerto Rico	1–3	Mexico	12–25	23–25	25–21	18–25		78–96	

== Final ==
Date	Time		Score		Set 1	Set 2	Set 3	Set 4	Set 5	Total	Report
24 July	16:00	United States	3–0	Canada	25–7	25–16	25–20			75–43	

== Final standing ==
Rank	Team
1st place, gold medalist(s)	United States
2nd place, silver medalist(s)	Canada
3rd place, bronze medalist(s)	Mexico
4	Puerto Rico
5	Dominican Republic
6	Costa Rica
7	Cuba
8	U.S. Virgin Islands
9	Jamaica

== Individual awards ==
- Most valuable player
  - Cala Haffner (USA)
- Best scorer
  - Alajandra Gonzalez (MEX)
- Best setter
  - Olivia Orsz (CAN)
- Best Opposite
  - Rayni Mondesi (DOM)
- Best spikers
  - Ireland Real (USA)
  - Leandry Almonte (DOM)
- Best middle blockers
  - Isabella Gallardo (MEX)
  - Brenda Esquivel (MEX)
- Best libero
  - Iana Gonzalez (PUR)
- Best server
  - Josalyn Samuels (USA)
- Best receiver
  - Cala Haffner (USA)
- Best digger
  - Iana Gonzalez (PUR)

== See also ==
- 2026 Boys U19 NORCECA Continental Championship
