= 2025 Girls' U19 NORCECA Pan American Cup =

Tournament details
- Host country: Canada
- Dates: 22–29 June 2025
- Teams: 7
- Venue: (in Kingston, Ontario host cities)

Final positions
- Champions: United States (3rd title)
- Runners-up: Mexico
- Third place: Canada

Tournament awards
- MVP: Kari Knotts (USA)

The 2025 Girls' U19 NORCECA Pan American Cup was the eighth edition of the bi-annual women's volleyball tournament. Seven teams participated in this edition held in Kingston, Ontario.

The United States won their third consecutive title. Kari Knotts of the United States won the Most Valuable Player award.

== Preliminary round ==
=== Group A ===
Pos	Team	Pld	W	L	Pts	SPW	SPL	SPR	SW	SL	SR	Qualification
1	United States	3	3	0	14	247	202	1.223	9	1	9.000	Semifinals
2	Mexico	3	2	1	9	232	214	1.084	6	4	1.500	Semifinals
3	Venezuela	3	1	2	4	250	271	0.923	4	8	0.500	
4	Puerto Rico	3	0	3	3	246	288	0.854	3	9	0.333	

Date	Time		Score		Set 1	Set 2	Set 3	Set 4	Set 5	Total	Report
24 June	14:30	Puerto Rico	0–3	Mexico	20–25	20–25	18–25			58–75	P2 P3
24 June	16:30	United States	3–0	Venezuela	25–9	25–23	25–21			75–53	P2 P3
25 June	14:30	Puerto Rico	2–3	Venezuela	15–25	20–25	30–28	25–22	14–16	104–116	P2 P3
25 June	16:30	United States	3–0	Mexico	25–21	25–21	25–23			75–65	P2 P3
26 June	14:30	Mexico	3–1	Venezuela	17–25	25–23	25–13	25–20		92–81	P2 P3
26 June	16:30	United States	3–1	Puerto Rico	20–25	25–20	25–14	27–25		97–84	P2 P3

=== Group B ===
Pos	Team	Pld	W	L	Pts	SPW	SPL	SPR	SW	SL	SR	Qualification
1	Canada	2	2	0	10	153	127	1.205	6	0	MAX	Semifinals
2	Dominican Republic	2	1	1	5	137	111	1.234	3	3	1.000	Semifinals
3	Costa Rica	2	0	2	0	101	153	0.660	0	6	0.000	

Date	Time		Score		Set 1	Set 2	Set 3	Set 4	Set 5	Total	Report
24 June	18:30	Canada	3–0	Costa Rica	25–19	28–26	25–20			78–65	P2 P3
25 June	18:30	Canada	3–0	Dominican Republic	25–22	25–23	25–17			75–62	P2 P3
26 June	18:30	Costa Rica	0–3	Dominican Republic	14–25	8–25	14–25			36–75	P2 P3

== Final round ==
=== Championship bracket ===
Semifinals
United States	3
Dominican Republic	0
Canada	2
Mexico	3

Final
United States	3
Mexico	0
Third place
Dominican Republic	2
Canada	3

=== Classification 5–7 ===
Date	Time		Score		Set 1	Set 2	Set 3	Set 4	Set 5	Total	Report
27 June	14:30	Venezuela	3–0	Costa Rica	25–22	25–19	25–19			75–60	P2 P3

=== Semifinals ===
Date	Time		Score		Set 1	Set 2	Set 3	Set 4	Set 5	Total	Report
27 June	16:30	United States	3–0	Dominican Republic	25–22	25–14	25–20			75–56	P2 P3
27 June	18:30	Canada	2–3	Mexico	25–19	19–25	26–24	16–25	10–15	96–108	P2 P3

=== Sixth place match ===
Date	Time		Score		Set 1	Set 2	Set 3	Set 4	Set 5	Total	Report
28 June	12:00	Costa Rica	0–3	Puerto Rico	20–25	29–31	19–25			68–81	P2 P3

=== Bronze medal match ===
Date	Time		Score		Set 1	Set 2	Set 3	Set 4	Set 5	Total	Report
28 June	14:00	Dominican Republic	2–3	Canada	22–25	18–25	25–18	25–19	10–15	100–102	P2 P3

=== Final ===
Date	Time		Score		Set 1	Set 2	Set 3	Set 4	Set 5	Total	Report
28 June	16:00	United States	3–0	Mexico	25–21	25–22	25–21			75–64	P2 P3

== Final standing ==
Rank	Team
1st place, gold medalist(s)	United States
2nd place, silver medalist(s)	Mexico
3rd place, bronze medalist(s)	Canada
4	Dominican Republic
5	Venezuela
6	Puerto Rico
7	Costa Rica

== Individual awards ==
- Most valuable player
  - Kari Knotts (USA)
- Best scorer
  - Naomi Cruz (MEX)
- Best setter
  - Taimane Ainu’u (USA)
- Best Opposite
  - Julie Arias (DOM)
- Best spiker
  - Kari Knotts (USA)
  - Ireland Real (USA)
- Best blocker
  - Sofia Esquivel (MEX)
  - Maya Bukovcan (CAN)
- Best libero
  - Valeria Gutierrez (CRC)
- Best server
  - Julie Arias (DOM)
- Best receiver
  - Pamela Agosto (PUR)
- Best digger
  - Valeria Gutierrez (CRC)
