= 2023 Girls' U19 NORCECA Pan American Cup =

Tournament details
- Host country: Puerto Rico
- Dates: 7–15 May 2023
- Teams: 8
- Venue: (in Juana Diaz host cities)

Final positions
- Champions: United States (2nd title)
- Runners-up: Mexico
- Third place: Puerto Rico

Tournament awards
- MVP: Blaire Bayless (USA)

The 2023 Girls' U19 NORCECA Pan American Cup was the seventh edition of the bi-annual women's volleyball tournament. Eight teams participated in this edition held in Juana Diaz.

The United States won their second consecutive title. Blaire Bayless of the United States won the Most Valuable Player award.

== Preliminary round ==
=== Group A ===
Pos	Team	Pld	W	L	Pts	SPW	SPL	SPR	SW	SL	SR	Qualification
1	United States	3	3	0	15	225	116	1.940	9	0	MAX	Semifinals
2	Mexico	3	2	1	10	192	169	1.136	6	3	2.000	Quarterfinals
3	Costa Rica	3	1	2	5	161	194	0.830	3	6	0.500	Quarterfinals
4	U.S. Virgin Islands	3	0	3	0	126	225	0.560	0	9	0.000	

Date	Time		Score		Set 1	Set 2	Set 3	Set 4	Set 5	Total	Report
9 May	14:00	United States	3–0	U.S. Virgin Islands	25–6	25–18	25–12			75–36	P2 P3
9 May	16:00	Mexico	3–0	Costa Rica	25–19	25–14	25–15			75–48	P2 P3
10 May	14:00	United States	3–0	Costa Rica	25–13	25–13	25–12			75–38	P2 P3
10 May	16:00	Mexico	3–0	U.S. Virgin Islands	25–15	25–14	25–17			75–46	P2 P3
11 May	14:00	Costa Rica	3–0	U.S. Virgin Islands	25–16	25–13	25–15			75–44	P2 P3
11 May	16:00	United States	3–0	Mexico	25–14	25–11	25–17			75–42	P2 P3

=== Group B ===
Pos	Team	Pld	W	L	Pts	SPW	SPL	SPR	SW	SL	SR	Qualification
1	Puerto Rico	3	3	0	14	245	170	1.441	9	1	9.000	Semifinals
2	Dominican Republic	3	2	1	11	235	178	1.320	7	3	2.333	Quarterfinals
3	Canada	3	1	2	5	191	184	1.038	3	6	0.500	Quarterfinals
4	Honduras	3	0	3	0	86	225	0.382	0	9	0.000	

Date	Time		Score		Set 1	Set 2	Set 3	Set 4	Set 5	Total	Report
9 May	18:00	Dominican Republic	3–0	Honduras	25–10	25–6	25–9			75–25	P2 P3
9 May	20:00	Canada	0–3	Puerto Rico	20–25	17–25	21–25			58–75	P2 P3
10 May	18:00	Canada	3–0	Honduras	25–10	25–7	25–13			75–30	P2 P3
10 May	20:00	Dominican Republic	1–3	Puerto Rico	20–25	25–19	24–26	12–25		81–95	P2 P3
11 May	18:00	Dominican Republic	3–0	Canada	25–17	29–27	25–14			79–58	P2 P3
11 May	20:00	Puerto Rico	3–0	Honduras	25–10	25–12	25–9			75–31	P2 P3

== Final round ==
=== Championship bracket ===
Quarterfinals
A2	Mexico	3
B3	Canada	2
B2	Dominican Republic	2
A3	Costa Rica	3

Semifinals
A2	Mexico	3
B1	Puerto Rico	1
A3	United States	3
A1	Costa Rica	0

Final
A2	Mexico	0
A1	United States	3
Third place
B1	Puerto Rico	3
A3	Costa Rica	1

=== Quarterfinals ===
Date	Time		Score		Set 1	Set 2	Set 3	Set 4	Set 5	Total	Report
12 May	18:00	Mexico	3–2	Canada	23–25	25–17	29–27	23–25	15–12	115–106	P2 P3
12 May	20:00	Dominican Republic	2–3	Costa Rica	25–20	26–28	25–22	22–25	13–15	111–110	P2 P3

=== Classification 5–8 ===
Date	Time		Score		Set 1	Set 2	Set 3	Set 4	Set 5	Total	Report
13 May	14:00	Honduras	0–3	Dominican Republic	9–25	9–25	7–25			25–75	P2 P3
13 May	16:00	U.S. Virgin Islands	0–3	Canada	12–25	16–25	13–25			41–75	P2 P3

=== Semifinals ===
Date	Time		Score		Set 1	Set 2	Set 3	Set 4	Set 5	Total	Report
13 May	20:00	Puerto Rico	1–3	Mexico	23–25	21–25	25–18	23–25		92–93	P2 P3
13 May	18:00	United States	3–0	Costa Rica	25–14	25–20	25–6			75–40	P2 P3

=== Seventh place match ===
Date	Time		Score		Set 1	Set 2	Set 3	Set 4	Set 5	Total	Report
14 May	13:00	Honduras	0–3	U.S. Virgin Islands	20–25	20–25	17–25			57–75	P2 P3

=== Fifth place match ===
Date	Time		Score		Set 1	Set 2	Set 3	Set 4	Set 5	Total	Report
14 May	15:00	Dominican Republic	3–1	Canada	19–25	26–24	25–14	25–19		95–82	P2 P3

=== Bronze medal match ===
Date	Time		Score		Set 1	Set 2	Set 3	Set 4	Set 5	Total	Report
14 May	17:00	Puerto Rico	3–1	Costa Rica	25–19	22–25	29–27	25–12		101–83	P2 P3

=== Final ===
Date	Time		Score		Set 1	Set 2	Set 3	Set 4	Set 5	Total	Report
14 May	19:00	Mexico	0–3	United States	8–25	18–25	18–25			44–75	P2 P3

== Final standing ==
Rank	Team
1st place, gold medalist(s)	United States
2nd place, silver medalist(s)	Mexico
3rd place, bronze medalist(s)	Puerto Rico
4	Costa Rica
5	Dominican Republic
6	Canada
7	U.S. Virgin Islands
8	Honduras

== Individual awards ==
- Most valuable player
  - Blaire Bayless (USA)
- Best scorer
  - Ariana Rodríguez (DOM)
- Best setter
  - Dariana Valencia (PUR)
- Best Opposite
  - Grace López (PUR)
- Best outside hitters
  - Elena Garcia (PUR)
  - Katielle Alonza (DOM)
- Best middle blockers
  - Elizabeth Andrew (USA)
  - Yalyn Firpo (DOM)
- Best libero
  - Ainoah Cruz (PUR)
- Best server
  - Ariana Rodríguez (DOM)
- Best receiver
  - Ava Falduto (USA)
- Best digger
  - Ainoah Cruz (PUR)
