= 2024 Girls U19 NORCECA Continental Championship =

Tournament details
- Host country: Honduras
- Dates: 12–20 July
- Teams: 8
- Venue: 1 (in 1 host city)

Final positions
- Champions: United States (9th title)
- Runners-up: Canada
- Third place: Puerto Rico
- Fourth place: Mexico

Tournament awards
- MVP: Manaia Ogbechie (USA)

The 2024 Girls U19 NORCECA Continental Championship was the twelfth edition of the bi-annual volleyball tournament. It was held in Tegucigalpa, Honduras from 12 to 20 July among eight countries. The United States won the tournament with ninth titles. Manaia Ogbechie of the United States won the Most Valuable Player award.

== Preliminary round ==
=== Group A ===
Pos	Team	Pld	W	L	Pts	SPW	SPL	SPR	SW	SL	SR	Qualification
1	United States	3	3	0	15	225	145	1.552	9	0	MAX	Semifinals
2	Canada	3	2	1	10	197	186	1.059	6	3	2.000	Quarterfinals
3	Puerto Rico	3	1	2	5	191	194	0.985	3	6	0.500	Quarterfinals
4	Cuba	3	0	3	0	137	225	0.609	0	9	0.000	5th–8th classification

Date	Time		Score		Set 1	Set 2	Set 3	Set 4	Set 5	Total	Report
14 Jul	16:00	Canada	3–0	Puerto Rico	25–22	25–15	25–21			75–58	P2 P3
14 Jul	18:00	United States	3–0	Cuba	25–8	25–11	25–21			75–40	P2 P3
15 Jul	16:00	Cuba	0–3	Puerto Rico	17–25	17–25	10–25			44–75	P2 P3
15 Jul	18:00	Canada	0–3	United States	19–25	13–25	15–25			47–75	P2 P3
16 Jul	16:00	United States	3–0	Puerto Rico	25–20	25–16	25–22			75–58	P2 P3
16 Jul	18:00	Canada	3–0	Cuba	25–20	25–12	25–21			75–53	P2 P3

=== Group B ===
Pos	Team	Pld	W	L	Pts	SPW	SPL	SPR	SW	SL	SR	Qualification
1	Mexico	3	3	0	15	228	142	1.606	9	0	MAX	Semifinals
2	Dominican Republic	3	2	1	10	213	170	1.253	6	3	2.000	Quarterfinals
3	Costa Rica	3	1	2	3	203	252	0.806	3	8	0.375	Quarterfinals
4	Honduras	3	0	3	2	178	258	0.690	2	9	0.222	5th–8th classification

Date	Time		Score		Set 1	Set 2	Set 3	Set 4	Set 5	Total	Report
14 Jul	14:00	Mexico	3–0	Dominican Republic	25–19	28–26	25–18			78–63	P2 P3
14 Jul	20:00	Honduras	2–3	Costa Rica	23–25	27–25	14–25	25–18	13–15	102–108	P2 P3
15 Jul	14:00	Mexico	3–0	Costa Rica	25–16	25–15	25–15			75–46	P2 P3
15 Jul	20:00	Honduras	0–3	Dominican Republic	20–25	11–25	12–25			43–75	P2 P3
16 Jul	14:00	Costa Rica	0–3	Dominican Republic	11–25	20–25	18–25			49–75	P2 P3
16 Jul	20:00	Honduras	0–3	Mexico	10–25	15–25	8–25			33–75	P2 P3

== Final round ==
=== Bracket ===
Quarterfinals
Dominican Republic	0
Puerto Rico	3
Canada	3
Costa Rica	0

Semifinals
United States	3
Puerto Rico	0
Canada	3
Mexico	2

Finals
United States	3
Canada	1
Third place
Puerto Rico	3
Mexico	0

=== Quarterfinals ===
Date	Time		Score		Set 1	Set 2	Set 3	Set 4	Set 5	Total	Report
17 July	17:00	Dominican Republic	0–3	Puerto Rico	16–25	13–25	21–25			50–75	P2 P3
17 July	19:00	Canada	3–0	Costa Rica	25–4	25–19	25–11			75–34	P2 P3

=== 5th–8th Classification ===
Date	Time		Score		Set 1	Set 2	Set 3	Set 4	Set 5	Total	Report
18 July	14:00	Honduras	0–3	Dominican Republic	18–25	19–25	11–25			48–75	P2 P3
18 July	16:00	Cuba	1–3	Costa Rica	25–19	18–25	21–25	19–25		83–94	P2 P3

=== Semifinals ===
Date	Time		Score		Set 1	Set 2	Set 3	Set 4	Set 5	Total	Report
18 July	18:00	Mexico	2–3	Canada	19–25	25–7	26–24	21–25	11–15	102–96	P2 P3
18 July	20:00	United States	3–0	Puerto Rico	25–21	25–22	25–16			75–59	P2 P3

=== 7th place ===
Date	Time		Score		Set 1	Set 2	Set 3	Set 4	Set 5	Total	Report
19 July	12:00	Honduras	0–3	Cuba	23–25	27–29	23–25			73–79	P2 P3

=== 5th place ===
Date	Time		Score		Set 1	Set 2	Set 3	Set 4	Set 5	Total	Report
19 July	14:00	Dominican Republic	3–0	Costa Rica	25–13	25–14	25–13			75–40	P2 P3

=== 3rd place ===
Date	Time		Score		Set 1	Set 2	Set 3	Set 4	Set 5	Total	Report
19 July	16:00	Mexico	0–3	Puerto Rico	19–25	23–25	23–25			65–75	P2 P3

=== Final ===
Date	Time		Score		Set 1	Set 2	Set 3	Set 4	Set 5	Total	Report
19 July	18:00	Canada	1–3	United States	17–25	25–20	24–26	14–25		80–96	P2 P3

== Finals standing ==
Rank	Team
1st place, gold medalist(s)	United States
2nd place, silver medalist(s)	Canada
3rd place, bronze medalist(s)	Puerto Rico
4	Mexico
5	Dominican Republic
6	Costa Rica
7	Cuba
8	Honduras

== Individual awards ==
- Most valuable player
  - Manaia Ogbechie (USA)
- Best spiker
  - Audrey Flanagan (USA)
- Best blocker
  - Julie Arias (DOM)
- Best setter
  - Genevieve Harris (USA)
- Best opposite
  - Caroline Rodríguez (DOM)
- Best libero
  - Jimena Alfaro (CRC)
- Best receiver
  - Audrey Flanagan (USA)
- Best digger
  - Jimena Alfaro (CRC)
- Best server
  - Audrey Flanagan (USA)
- Best scorer
  - Naomi Cruz (MEX)
