= Cuba women's national under-19 volleyball team =

Youth volleyball team representing Cuba

Cuba
- Association: Cuban Volleyball Federation
- Confederation: NORCECA

Uniforms
Home	Away	Third

Youth Olympic Games
- Appearances: None

FIVB U19 World Championship
- Appearances: 6 (First in 1989)
- Best result: 5th place : (1989)

NORCECA U18 Championship
- Appearances: None

The Cuba women's national under-18 volleyball team represents Cuba in women's under-18 volleyball events, it is controlled and managed by the Cuban Volleyball Federation that is a member of North American volleyball body North, Central America and Caribbean Volleyball Confederation (NORCECA) and the international volleyball body government the Fédération Internationale de Volleyball (FIVB).

== Results ==
=== Summer Youth Olympics ===
Champions Runners up Third place Fourth place

Youth Olympic Games
Year	Round	Position	Pld	W	L	SW	SL	Squad
(Singapore) 2010	Didn't Qualify							
(China) 2014	No Volleyball Event							
(Argentina) 2018	No Volleyball Event							
Total	0 Titles	0/1						

=== FIVB U18 World Championship ===
Champions Runners up Third place Fourth place

FIVB U18 World Championship
Year	Round	Position	Pld	W	L	SW	SL	Squad
(Brazil) 1989		5th place						Squad
(Portugal) 1991	Didn't Qualify							
(Czechoslovakia) 1993		7th place						Squad
(France) 1995		8th place						Squad
(Thailand) 1997		8th place						Squad
(Portugal) 1999	Didn't Qualify							
(Croatia) 2001	Didn't Qualify							
(Poland) 2003	Didn't Qualify							
(Macau) 2005	Didn't Qualify							
(Mexico) 2007	Didn't Qualify							
(Thailand) 2009	Didn't Qualify							
(Turkey) 2011	Didn't Qualify							
(Thailand) 2013	Didn't Qualify							
(Peru) 2015		20th place						Squad
(Argentina) 2017		20th place						Squad
(Egypt) 2019	Didn't Qualify							
(Mexico) 2021	Didn't Qualify							
Total	0 Titles	6/17						

=== NORCECA Girls' U18 Championship ===
Champions Runners up Third place Fourth place

NORCECA Girls' U18 Championship
Year	Round	Position	Pld	W	L	SW	SL	Squad
(Puerto Rico) 1998	Didn't Enter							
(Dominican Republic) 2000	Didn't Enter							
(United States) 2002	Didn't Enter							
(Puerto Rico) 2004	Didn't Enter							
(United States) 2006	Didn't Enter							
(Puerto Rico) 2008	Didn't Enter							
(Guatemala) 2010	Didn't Enter							
(Mexico) 2012	Didn't Enter							
(Costa Rica) 2014	Didn't Enter							
(Puerto Rico) 2016	Didn't Enter							
(Honduras) 2018	Semifinals	3rd place	5	4	1	14	4	Squad
Total	0 Titles	1/11						

=== Pan-American U18 Cup ===
Champions Runners up Third place Fourth place

Pan-American U18 Cup
Year	Round	Position	Pld	W	L	SW	SL	Squad
(Mexico) 2011	Didn't Enter							
(Guatemala) 2013	Didn't Enter							
(Cuba) 2015	Semifinals	Third place						Squad
(Cuba) 2017	Final	Runners-Up						Squad
(Mexico) 2019	Quarterfinals	5th place	6	4	2	15	8	Squad
Total	0 Titles	2/4						

== Team ==
=== Current squad ===
The following is the Cuban roster in the 2019 Girls' Youth Pan-American Volleyball Cup.

Head Coach: (Cuba) Jaime Luis Echevarria

No.	Name	Date of birth	Height	Weight	Spike	Block	2019 club
2	Dezirett Rosales	10 December 2002	1.83 m (6 ft 0 in)	71 kg (157 lb)	289 cm (114 in)	278 cm (109 in)	(Cuba) La Habana
3	Yensy Iznaga	26 December 2003	1.8 m (5 ft 11 in)	56 kg (123 lb)	289 cm (114 in)	285 cm (112 in)	(Cuba) Ciego de Avila
5	Dayana Hernandez	19 October 2002	1.89 m (6 ft 2 in)	74 kg (163 lb)	285 cm (112 in)	280 cm (110 in)	(Cuba) Cienfuegos
8	Danieisy Springer	19 September 2002	1.8 m (5 ft 11 in)	71 kg (157 lb)	289 cm (114 in)	275 cm (108 in)	(Cuba) Las Tunas
9	Yaimaris Victoria	3 December 2002	1.83 m (6 ft 0 in)	73 kg (161 lb)	265 cm (104 in)	258 cm (102 in)	(Cuba) Camagüey
10	Yamilena Pis	31 January 2003	1.8 m (5 ft 11 in)	56 kg (123 lb)	289 cm (114 in)	285 cm (112 in)	(Cuba) Holguín
11	Claudia Alarcon	26 January 2003	1.89 m (6 ft 2 in)	76 kg (168 lb)	315 cm (124 in)	308 cm (121 in)	(Cuba) Las Tunas
14	Alejandro Hechevarria	1 January 2003	1.78 m (5 ft 10 in)	65 kg (143 lb)	312 cm (123 in)	310 cm (120 in)	Santiago de Cuba
15	Amelia Moises	7 February 2002	1.86 m (6 ft 1 in)	67 kg (148 lb)	246 cm (97 in)	244 cm (96 in)	(Cuba) Camagüey
16	Thainalien Leyva	17 March 2003	1.79 m (5 ft 10 in)	67 kg (148 lb)	230 cm (91 in)	227 cm (89 in)	(Cuba) Granma
20	Yalain Gonzalez	6 September 2003	1.8 m (5 ft 11 in)	56 kg (123 lb)	278 cm (109 in)	275 cm (108 in)	(Cuba) La Habana
24	Thalia Reyes	10 April 2002	1.89 m (6 ft 2 in)	76 kg (168 lb)	315 cm (124 in)	308 cm (121 in)	(Cuba) Villa Clara
