= 2019 FIVB Volleyball Girls' U18 World Championship squads =

This article shows the rosters of all participating teams at the 2019 FIVB Volleyball Girls' U18 World Championship in Egypt.

== Pool A ==
=== Brazil ===
The following is the Brazilian roster in the 2019 FIVB Girls' U18 World Championship.

Head coach: Hylmer do Nascimento Dias

No.	Name	Date of birth	Height	Weight	Spike	Block	2019 club
1	Istefani dos Santos Silva	24 March 2003	1.8 m (5 ft 11 in)	62 kg (137 lb)	284 cm (112 in)	278 cm (109 in)	(Brazil) Nova Trento
2	Marcelle de Arruda Mattos da Silva	2 February 2002	1.63 m (5 ft 4 in)	54 kg (119 lb)	286 cm (113 in)	262 cm (103 in)	(Brazil) Tijuca T.C.
3	Ana Cecília Aparecida Lopes	25 September 2003	1.76 m (5 ft 9 in)	74 kg (163 lb)	286 cm (113 in)	274 cm (108 in)	(Brazil) Bradesco
5	Stephany Gomes Xavier Morete (c)	30 August 2003	1.79 m (5 ft 10 in)	76 kg (168 lb)	289 cm (114 in)	276 cm (109 in)	(Brazil) Fluminense FC
7	Ana Cristina Menezes Oliveira de Souza	7 April 2004	1.92 m (6 ft 4 in)	79 kg (174 lb)	309 cm (122 in)	296 cm (117 in)	(Brazil) E.C.Pinheiros
8	Lívia dos Santos Gomes Lima	8 June 2003	1.84 m (6 ft 0 in)	70 kg (150 lb)	302 cm (119 in)	284 cm (112 in)	(Brazil) Tijuca T.C.
10	Júlia Gambatto Kudiess	2 January 2003	1.89 m (6 ft 2 in)	76 kg (168 lb)	301 cm (119 in)	287 cm (113 in)	(Brazil) Minas TC
11	Maria Clara Albrecht Carvalhaes	28 September 2003	1.73 m (5 ft 8 in)	74 kg (163 lb)	282 cm (111 in)	275 cm (108 in)	(Brazil) Fluminense FC
12	Carolina Grossi de Souza Santos	28 June 2002	1.91 m (6 ft 3 in)	76 kg (168 lb)	292 cm (115 in)	282 cm (111 in)	(Brazil) Barueri
16	Kátia Larissa Machado da Silva	4 October 2002	1.84 m (6 ft 0 in)	74 kg (163 lb)	291 cm (115 in)	285 cm (112 in)	(Brazil) Recreio da Juventude
18	Ana Luiza Rüdiger	2 January 2003	1.82 m (6 ft 0 in)	68 kg (150 lb)	290 cm (110 in)	278 cm (109 in)	(Brazil) Palotina
20	Letícia Araújo Almeida Holanda Moura	8 May 2003	1.59 m (5 ft 3 in)	54 kg (119 lb)	272 cm (107 in)	252 cm (99 in)	(Brazil) Fluminense F

=== Cameroon ===
The following is the Camerooni roster in the 2019 FIVB Girls' U18 World Championship.

Head coach: Rose Beleng A Ngon

No.	Name	Date of birth	Height	Weight	Spike	Block	2019 club
1	Ruth Manuela Marie Bibinbe (c)	23 April 2002	1.98 m (6 ft 6 in)	90 kg (200 lb)	330 cm (130 in)	310 cm (120 in)	(Cameroon) BAFIA VOLLEYBALL EVOLUTION
2	Chantal Dang	22 July 2003	1.88 m (6 ft 2 in)	79 kg (174 lb)	0 cm (0 in)	0 cm (0 in)	(Cameroon) BAFIA VOLLEYBALL EVOLUTION
3	Reine Ngameni Mbopda Davina	14 November 2002	1.68 m (5 ft 6 in)	65 kg (143 lb)	250 cm (98 in)	240 cm (94 in)	(Cameroon) BAFIA VOLLEYBALL EVOLUTION
4	Christiane Brandy Gatcheu Djeutchoko	25 March 2003	1.82 m (6 ft 0 in)	74 kg (163 lb)	220 cm (87 in)	190 cm (75 in)	(Cameroon) ARC EN CIEL VOLLEYBALL
5	Ivan Nancy Agnoung A Mbira	22 August 2002	1.75 m (5 ft 9 in)	65 kg (143 lb)	280 cm (110 in)	260 cm (100 in)	(Cameroon) BAFIA VOLLEYBALL EVOLUTION
6	Gaelle Estelle Tchuembou Wambo	1 December 2002	1.81 m (5 ft 11 in)	79 kg (174 lb)	320 cm (130 in)	300 cm (120 in)	(Cameroon) NYONG ET KELLE VOLLEYBALL
7	Danna Gracile Fosso Nguemtchueng	14 May 2004	1.8 m (5 ft 11 in)	82 kg (181 lb)	240 cm (94 in)	235 cm (93 in)	(Cameroon) BAFIA VOLLEYBALL EVOLUTION
8	Larissa Amrakaye Wakissa	11 June 2002	1.66 m (5 ft 5 in)	54 kg (119 lb)	210 cm (83 in)	190 cm (75 in)	(Cameroon) DANAY VOLLEYBALL EVOLUTION
9	Jeanne D'arc Ayangma Kabadiang Beni	12 May 2002	1.87 m (6 ft 2 in)	77 kg (170 lb)	320 cm (130 in)	300 cm (120 in)	(Cameroon) CONQUISTADORES VOLLEYBALL
10	Michelle Wete Sissako	8 January 2003	1.8 m (5 ft 11 in)	66 kg (146 lb)	210 cm (83 in)	190 cm (75 in)	(Cameroon) BAFIA VOLLEYBALL EVOLUTION
11	Ange Nicaise Motba A Mbep	8 March 2003	1.8 m (5 ft 11 in)	72 kg (159 lb)	200 cm (79 in)	170 cm (67 in)	(Cameroon) BAFIA VOLLEYBALL EVOLUTION
15	Julienne Serena Bikomo Bomba	20 March 2003	1.82 m (6 ft 0 in)	68 kg (150 lb)	290 cm (110 in)	290 cm (110 in)	(Cameroon) CONQUISTADORES VOLLEYBAL

=== China ===
The following is the Chinese roster in the 2019 FIVB Girls' U18 World Championship.

Head coach: Changwen Yu

No.	Name	Date of birth	Height	Weight	Spike	Block	2019 club
1	Mengjie Wu (c)	10 September 2002	1.89 m (6 ft 2 in)	64 kg (141 lb)	323 cm (127 in)	315 cm (124 in)	(China) Jiangsu
2	Yushan Zhuang	28 April 2003	1.82 m (6 ft 0 in)	73 kg (161 lb)	305 cm (120 in)	297 cm (117 in)	(China) Fujian
3	Wenhan Wang	28 June 2002	1.91 m (6 ft 3 in)	75 kg (165 lb)	313 cm (123 in)	307 cm (121 in)	(China) Shandong
4	Ruiqi Wang	2 March 2002	1.86 m (6 ft 1 in)	65 kg (143 lb)	310 cm (120 in)	305 cm (120 in)	(China) Beijing
5	Kefan Zhang	3 June 2002	1.77 m (5 ft 10 in)	66 kg (146 lb)	287 cm (113 in)	280 cm (110 in)	(China) Shandong
6	Xin Liu	28 February 2002	1.85 m (6 ft 1 in)	75 kg (165 lb)	304 cm (120 in)	298 cm (117 in)	(China) Tianjin
7	Xingchen Zhu	24 October 2003	1.65 m (5 ft 5 in)	63 kg (139 lb)	279 cm (110 in)	273 cm (107 in)	(China) Shanghai
8	Yetong Zhou	4 May 2002	1.86 m (6 ft 1 in)	76 kg (168 lb)	311 cm (122 in)	306 cm (120 in)	(China) Jiangsu
9	Meijun Liu	21 August 2002	1.81 m (5 ft 11 in)	62 kg (137 lb)	302 cm (119 in)	294 cm (116 in)	(China) Tianjin
11	Xiaorui Yang	7 June 2002	1.81 m (5 ft 11 in)	60 kg (130 lb)	293 cm (115 in)	287 cm (113 in)	(China) Liaoning
12	Yifei Wang	14 September 2002	1.85 m (6 ft 1 in)	78 kg (172 lb)	309 cm (122 in)	300 cm (120 in)	(China) Liaoning
15	Sijia Xia	13 April 2002	1.87 m (6 ft 2 in)	67 kg (148 lb)	312 cm (123 in)	306 cm (120 in)	(China) Tianjin

=== Egypt ===
The following is the Egyptian roster in the 2019 FIVB Girls' U18 World Championship.

Head coach: Marco Queiroga

No.	Name	Date of birth	Height	Weight	Spike	Block	2019 club
1	Nada Morgan	1 August 2003	1.76 m (5 ft 9 in)	70 kg (150 lb)	285 cm (112 in)	275 cm (108 in)	(Egypt) Shooting Club
2	Loujayn Sadek	27 August 2002	1.79 m (5 ft 10 in)	73 kg (161 lb)	275 cm (108 in)	265 cm (104 in)	(Egypt) HELIOPOLIS
3	Sama Mohamed	10 January 2002	1.77 m (5 ft 10 in)	55 kg (121 lb)	275 cm (108 in)	265 cm (104 in)	(Egypt) Shooting Club
5	Mariam Bakr	26 February 2003	1.77 m (5 ft 10 in)	71 kg (157 lb)	265 cm (104 in)	255 cm (100 in)	(Egypt) AL AHLY SC
7	Salma Mahmoud	3 December 2003	1.85 m (6 ft 1 in)	78 kg (172 lb)	285 cm (112 in)	275 cm (108 in)	(Egypt) NASR CITY CLUB
8	Sabine Ali	4 September 2002	1.73 m (5 ft 8 in)	64 kg (141 lb)	275 cm (108 in)	265 cm (104 in)	(Egypt) Zamalek SC
9	Sandy Abdellatif	28 May 2002	1.78 m (5 ft 10 in)	72 kg (159 lb)	275 cm (108 in)	265 cm (104 in)	(Egypt) AL AHLY SC
10	Farida Elhenawy	1 March 2003	1.75 m (5 ft 9 in)	78 kg (172 lb)	285 cm (112 in)	275 cm (108 in)	(Egypt) AL AHLY SC
11	Nour Ali	30 May 2003	1.82 m (6 ft 0 in)	72 kg (159 lb)	285 cm (112 in)	275 cm (108 in)	(Egypt) AL AHLY SC
14	May Abdelmaguid (c)	4 May 2003	1.8 m (5 ft 11 in)	81 kg (179 lb)	285 cm (112 in)	275 cm (108 in)	(Egypt) AL AHLY SC
17	Ayah Elnady	25 August 2002	1.73 m (5 ft 8 in)	65 kg (143 lb)	285 cm (112 in)	275 cm (108 in)	(Egypt) Shooting Club
19	Salma Abdelhady	1 August 2003	2.08 m (6 ft 10 in)	94 kg (207 lb)	305 cm (120 in)	295 cm (116 in)	(Egypt) Shooting Club

=== Puerto Rico ===
The following is the Puerto Rican roster in the 2019 FIVB Girls' U18 World Championship.

Head coach: Juan C. Gonzalez

No.	Name	Date of birth	Height	Weight	Spike	Block	2019 club
1	Jennifer Collazo Monte De Oca	18 February 2002	1.8 m (5 ft 11 in)	50 kg (110 lb)	274 cm (108 in)	254 cm (100 in)	(Puerto Rico) National Team
2	Mariana Trujillo	24 April 2002	0.77 m (2 ft 6 in)	188 kg (414 lb)	247 cm (97 in)	242 cm (95 in)	(Puerto Rico) National Team
3	Kiaraliz Perez	29 July 2002	0.67 m (2 ft 2 in)	183 kg (403 lb)	244 cm (96 in)	235 cm (93 in)	(Puerto Rico) National Team
4	Sofia Victoria (c)	3 May 2002	1.8 m (5 ft 11 in)	69 kg (152 lb)	284 cm (112 in)	279 cm (110 in)	(Puerto Rico) National Team
5	Valeria Otero Morales	26 December 2002	1.7 m (5 ft 7 in)	58 kg (128 lb)	262 cm (103 in)	248 cm (98 in)	(Puerto Rico) National Team
7	Paola Matos Carrasquillo	24 December 2002	1.78 m (5 ft 10 in)	55 kg (121 lb)	270 cm (110 in)	250 cm (98 in)	(Puerto Rico) National Team
8	Alondra Maldonado	14 November 2002	0.72 m (2 ft 4 in)	190 kg (420 lb)	245 cm (96 in)	238 cm (94 in)	(Puerto Rico) National Team
9	Carolina Camacho Castro	12 September 2002	1.68 m (5 ft 6 in)	48 kg (106 lb)	265 cm (104 in)	248 cm (98 in)	(Puerto Rico) National Team
11	Maria Carattini Colon	25 June 2002	1.68 m (5 ft 6 in)	50 kg (110 lb)	260 cm (100 in)	241 cm (95 in)	(Puerto Rico) National Team
12	Marcelle Baez Carlo	14 February 2003	1.81 m (5 ft 11 in)	53 kg (117 lb)	273 cm (107 in)	253 cm (100 in)	(Puerto Rico) National Team
14	Cristal Paulino Rubel	26 April 2003	1.82 m (6 ft 0 in)	61 kg (134 lb)	274 cm (108 in)	256 cm (101 in)	(Puerto Rico) National Team
15	Claudia Borri Fernandez	11 April 2002	1.78 m (5 ft 10 in)	64 kg (141 lb)	270 cm (110 in)	252 cm (99 in)	(Puerto Rico) National Team

== Pool B ==
=== Canada ===
The following is the Canadian roster in the 2019 FIVB Girls' U18 World Championship.

Head coach: Scott Koskie

No.	Name	Date of birth	Height	Weight	Spike	Block	2019 club
1	Katerina Georgiadis	7 January 2002	1.68 m (5 ft 6 in)	54 kg (119 lb)	284 cm (112 in)	262 cm (103 in)	(Canada) Titans Volleyball Association
2	Katarina Pantovic	31 August 2002	1.82 m (6 ft 0 in)	66 kg (146 lb)	300 cm (120 in)	282 cm (111 in)	(Canada) Thunder 17U
4	Hannah Duchesneau	15 May 2002	1.83 m (6 ft 0 in)	71 kg (157 lb)	304 cm (120 in)	291 cm (115 in)	(Canada) Storm 17U
5	Madyson Saris	9 November 2003	1.81 m (5 ft 11 in)	81 kg (179 lb)	298 cm (117 in)	284 cm (112 in)	(Canada) Defensa 15U
6	Kaylee Plouffe	22 October 2002	1.85 m (6 ft 1 in)	77 kg (170 lb)	312 cm (123 in)	282 cm (111 in)	(Canada) Nooks Volleyball Club
7	Julia Murmann	10 November 2002	1.81 m (5 ft 11 in)	76 kg (168 lb)	298 cm (117 in)	282 cm (111 in)	(Canada) Leaside 18U
8	Lauren Pastor (c)	4 January 2002	1.79 m (5 ft 10 in)	76 kg (168 lb)	292 cm (115 in)	281 cm (111 in)	(Canada) Pakmen 17U
10	Emoni Bush	4 July 2003	1.86 m (6 ft 1 in)	81 kg (179 lb)	307 cm (121 in)	293 cm (115 in)	(Canada) Wave 16U
11	Emma Mckinnon	2 February 2002	1.82 m (6 ft 0 in)	63 kg (139 lb)	310 cm (120 in)	298 cm (117 in)	(Canada) HRVC 16U
14	Anna Smrek	11 October 2003	2 m (6 ft 7 in)	76 kg (168 lb)	320 cm (130 in)	309 cm (122 in)	(Canada) Defensa 15U
15	Kendra Kern	1 February 2002	1.79 m (5 ft 10 in)	81 kg (179 lb)	285 cm (112 in)	275 cm (108 in)	(Canada) Nooks Volleyball Club
18	Jenna Pollock	9 May 2003	1.87 m (6 ft 2 in)	68 kg (150 lb)	302 cm (119 in)	290 cm (110 in)	(Canada) Rapids 16U

=== Italy ===
The following is the Italian roster in the 2019 FIVB Girls' U18 World Championship.

Head coach: Marco Nazzareno Mencarelli

No.	Name	Date of birth	Height	Weight	Spike	Block	2019 club
2	Giulia Marconato	26 April 2003	1.88 m (6 ft 2 in)	81 kg (179 lb)	306 cm (120 in)	296 cm (117 in)	(Italy) Imoco Conegliano
3	Gaia Guiducci	9 March 2002	1.75 m (5 ft 9 in)	70 kg (150 lb)	0 cm (0 in)	0 cm (0 in)	(Italy) Volleyrò Roma
4	Emma Graziani	16 August 2002	1.9 m (6 ft 3 in)	77 kg (170 lb)	314 cm (124 in)	300 cm (120 in)	(Italy) Volleyrò Roma
5	Martina Armini	19 September 2002	1.75 m (5 ft 9 in)	69 kg (152 lb)	298 cm (117 in)	288 cm (113 in)	(Italy) Volleyrò Roma
6	Alessia Bolzonetti	15 February 2002	1.88 m (6 ft 2 in)	82 kg (181 lb)	310 cm (120 in)	298 cm (117 in)	(Italy) Igor Volley Novara
7	Linda Nkiruka Nwakalor	17 September 2002	1.87 m (6 ft 2 in)	70 kg (150 lb)	0 cm (0 in)	0 cm (0 in)	(Italy) Club Italia
8	Beatrice Gardini	1 April 2003	1.85 m (6 ft 1 in)	73 kg (161 lb)	306 cm (120 in)	299 cm (118 in)	(Italy) Volley Academy Modena
9	Sofia Monza (c)	11 May 2002	1.74 m (5 ft 9 in)	60 kg (130 lb)	304 cm (120 in)	299 cm (118 in)	(Italy) UYBA Volley Busto A.
12	Ajack John Majak Malual	3 June 2002	1.81 m (5 ft 11 in)	68 kg (150 lb)	310 cm (120 in)	298 cm (117 in)	(Italy) UYBA Volley Busto A.
15	Loveth Omoruyi	25 August 2002	1.84 m (6 ft 0 in)	75 kg (165 lb)	0 cm (0 in)	0 cm (0 in)	(Italy) Club Italia
17	Stella Nervini	10 September 2003	1.84 m (6 ft 0 in)	68 kg (150 lb)	302 cm (119 in)	294 cm (116 in)	(Italy) Volleyrò Roma
19	Giorgia Frosini	29 November 2002	1.88 m (6 ft 2 in)	75 kg (165 lb)	0 cm (0 in)	0 cm (0 in)	(Italy) San Donà

=== South Korea ===
The following is the Korean roster in the 2019 FIVB Girls' U18 World Championship.

Head coach: Dongsun Seo

No.	Name	Date of birth	Height	Weight	Spike	Block	2019 club
1	Jeonga Kim	8 February 2002	1.73 m (5 ft 8 in)	60 kg (130 lb)	270 cm (110 in)	260 cm (100 in)	(South Korea) Jecheon Girls Highschool
3	Haejin Park	15 April 2002	1.77 m (5 ft 10 in)	62 kg (137 lb)	270 cm (110 in)	260 cm (100 in)	(South Korea) Sunmyung Girls Highschool
7	Youkyeong Seo	2 May 2002	1.66 m (5 ft 5 in)	58 kg (128 lb)	260 cm (100 in)	255 cm (100 in)	(South Korea) Daejeon Yongsan Highschool
10	Seonwoo Lee	12 July 2002	1.83 m (6 ft 0 in)	68 kg (150 lb)	275 cm (108 in)	265 cm (104 in)	(South Korea) Namsung Girls Highschool
11	Hyojin Chong	20 September 2002	1.74 m (5 ft 9 in)	63 kg (139 lb)	260 cm (100 in)	250 cm (98 in)	(South Korea) Ilshin Girls Commercial Highschool
12	Subin Kim	14 September 2002	1.65 m (5 ft 5 in)	57 kg (126 lb)	253 cm (100 in)	243 cm (96 in)	(South Korea) Gangneung Girls Highschool
14	Jeongmin Choi	21 December 2002	1.8 m (5 ft 11 in)	62 kg (137 lb)	270 cm (110 in)	260 cm (100 in)	(South Korea) Hanbom Highschool
15	Suyeon Park	17 April 2003	1.76 m (5 ft 9 in)	62 kg (137 lb)	265 cm (104 in)	255 cm (100 in)	(South Korea) Gangneung Girls Highschool
16	Eunseo Park	16 April 2003	1.76 m (5 ft 9 in)	68 kg (150 lb)	263 cm (104 in)	253 cm (100 in)	(South Korea) IlshinGirlsCommercialHighschool
17	Sarang Park	26 August 2003	1.77 m (5 ft 10 in)	66 kg (146 lb)	265 cm (104 in)	255 cm (100 in)	(South Korea) Daegu Girls Highschool
18	Mireu Han (c)	13 July 2002	1.65 m (5 ft 5 in)	57 kg (126 lb)	255 cm (100 in)	245 cm (96 in)	(South Korea) Sunmyung Girls Highschool
19	Hyunji Lee	16 August 2003	1.78 m (5 ft 10 in)	73 kg (161 lb)	267 cm (105 in)	257 cm (101 in)	(South Korea) Mokpo Girls Commercial Highschool

=== Mexico ===
The following is the Mexican roster in the 2019 FIVB Girls' U18 World Championship.

Head coach: Ricardo De Jesus Naranjo Ponce

No.	Name	Date of birth	Height	Weight	Spike	Block	2019 club
2	Aime Margarita Topete Pardo	16 October 2005	1.78 m (5 ft 10 in)	80 kg (180 lb)	270 cm (110 in)	260 cm (100 in)	(Mexico) NAYARIT
3	Sofia Maldonado Diaz	6 February 2002	1.78 m (5 ft 10 in)	58 kg (128 lb)	275 cm (108 in)	260 cm (100 in)	(Mexico) JALISCO
4	Gabriela Félix Baeza	15 June 2002	1.56 m (5 ft 1 in)	55 kg (121 lb)	240 cm (94 in)	230 cm (91 in)	(Mexico) JALISCO
6	Grecia María Ung Enriquez	8 April 2003	1.71 m (5 ft 7 in)	55 kg (121 lb)	260 cm (100 in)	255 cm (100 in)	(Mexico) SONORA
7	Gloria Argentina Ung Enriquez	25 April 2002	1.81 m (5 ft 11 in)	59 kg (130 lb)	290 cm (110 in)	270 cm (110 in)	(Mexico) SONORA
8	Marian Aylin Ovalle Leyva	14 September 2002	1.78 m (5 ft 10 in)	66 kg (146 lb)	278 cm (109 in)	260 cm (100 in)	(Mexico) Chihuahua
10	María José González De La Cerda	15 September 2002	1.79 m (5 ft 10 in)	76 kg (168 lb)	270 cm (110 in)	268 cm (106 in)	(Mexico) JALISCO
11	Izabella Ceratti Cervantes	28 January 2003	1.76 m (5 ft 9 in)	68 kg (150 lb)	280 cm (110 in)	265 cm (104 in)	(Mexico) BAJA CALIFORNIA
12	Stephanie Mercado Salinas	6 May 2003	1.59 m (5 ft 3 in)	55 kg (121 lb)	230 cm (91 in)	230 cm (91 in)	(Mexico) NUEVO LEON
14	Cruz Solar Maria Ximena	3 January 2004	1.85 m (6 ft 1 in)	75 kg (165 lb)	290 cm (110 in)	260 cm (100 in)	(Mexico) VERACRUZ
16	Melanie Guadalupe Parra Quintero (c)	12 September 2002	1.76 m (5 ft 9 in)	50 kg (110 lb)	249 cm (98 in)	242 cm (95 in)	(Mexico) SINALOA
18	Angella Audrey Rivera Rios	30 September 2002	1.65 m (5 ft 5 in)	58 kg (128 lb)	260 cm (100 in)	255 cm (100 in)	(Mexico) NUEVO LEON

=== United States ===
The following is the American roster in the 2019 FIVB Girls' U18 World Championship.

Head coach: James Stone

No.	Name	Date of birth	Height	Weight	Spike	Block	2019 club
1	Lexi Rodriguez	11 March 2003	1.68 m (5 ft 6 in)	59 kg (130 lb)	282 cm (111 in)	269 cm (106 in)	(United States) Sports Performance Volleyball
3	Elena Oglivie	22 January 2002	1.78 m (5 ft 10 in)	66 kg (146 lb)	287 cm (113 in)	274 cm (108 in)	(United States) Ku'ikahi VBC
4	Sydney Taylor	15 April 2003	1.78 m (5 ft 10 in)	66 kg (146 lb)	287 cm (113 in)	274 cm (108 in)	(United States) Mintonette Sports
5	Allison Jacobs	1 February 2002	1.8 m (5 ft 11 in)	70 kg (150 lb)	323 cm (127 in)	297 cm (117 in)	(United States) Legacy Volleyball Club
6	Kamerynn Miner	17 March 2003	1.83 m (6 ft 0 in)	72 kg (159 lb)	315 cm (124 in)	300 cm (120 in)	(United States) Mizuno Long Beach
7	Kennedi Orr (c)	7 November 2002	1.83 m (6 ft 0 in)	75 kg (165 lb)	310 cm (120 in)	302 cm (119 in)	(United States) Mizuno Northern Lights
11	Jessica Mruzik	15 June 2002	1.85 m (6 ft 1 in)	77 kg (170 lb)	302 cm (119 in)	297 cm (117 in)	(United States) Legacy Volleyball Club
12	Caroline Crawford	5 March 2002	1.88 m (6 ft 2 in)	70 kg (150 lb)	324 cm (128 in)	310 cm (120 in)	(United States) Mid-America Volleyball
13	Devyn Robinson	9 July 2002	1.88 m (6 ft 2 in)	82 kg (181 lb)	302 cm (119 in)	287 cm (113 in)	(United States) Iowa Power Plex
14	Emily Londot	13 May 2002	1.88 m (6 ft 2 in)	86 kg (190 lb)	318 cm (125 in)	307 cm (121 in)	(United States) Mintonette Sports
17	Lindsay Krause	11 December 2002	1.91 m (6 ft 3 in)	75 kg (165 lb)	310 cm (120 in)	302 cm (119 in)	(United States) Nebraska Premier
20	Carter Booth	23 October 2003	2.01 m (6 ft 7 in)	95 kg (209 lb)	330 cm (130 in)	307 cm (121 in)	(United States) Colorado Juniors

== Pool C ==
=== Argentina ===
The following is the Argentinian roster in the 2019 FIVB Girls' U18 World Championship.

Head coach: Roberto Woelflin

No.	Name	Date of birth	Height	Weight	Spike	Block	2019 club
2	Aylen Ayub	18 June 2002	1.81 m (5 ft 11 in)	63 kg (139 lb)	290 cm (110 in)	273 cm (107 in)	(Argentina) GER - Rosario
3	Julieta Sandez	19 November 2002	1.9 m (6 ft 3 in)	85 kg (187 lb)	298 cm (117 in)	280 cm (110 in)	(Argentina) GELP
4	Maria Tiziana Puljiz	13 February 2002	1.8 m (5 ft 11 in)	68 kg (150 lb)	290 cm (110 in)	270 cm (110 in)	(Argentina) Regatas Resistencia
5	Catalina Rochaix	29 August 2002	1.71 m (5 ft 7 in)	64 kg (141 lb)	271 cm (107 in)	259 cm (102 in)	(Argentina) Club Bell
6	Bianca Bertolino	4 July 2002	1.85 m (6 ft 1 in)	70 kg (150 lb)	302 cm (119 in)	281 cm (111 in)	(Argentina) Union San Guillermo
7	Valentina Paredes	4 April 2002	1.73 m (5 ft 8 in)	60 kg (130 lb)	284 cm (112 in)	268 cm (106 in)	(Argentina) Trebolense
8	Guadalupe Martin (c)	23 March 2002	1.81 m (5 ft 11 in)	72 kg (159 lb)	288 cm (113 in)	273 cm (107 in)	(Argentina) Universidad - San Juan
9	Florencia Wolkowyski	10 December 2002	1.79 m (5 ft 10 in)	61 kg (134 lb)	290 cm (110 in)	277 cm (109 in)	(Argentina) Mar Chiquita
11	Bianca Cugno	22 April 2003	1.91 m (6 ft 3 in)	72 kg (159 lb)	290 cm (110 in)	270 cm (110 in)	(Argentina) S.S. Devoto
12	Evelyn Rohrberg	7 April 2003	1.86 m (6 ft 1 in)	76 kg (168 lb)	290 cm (110 in)	281 cm (111 in)	(Argentina) Union San Guillermo
13	Balbanera Azul Ulla	12 March 2002	1.84 m (6 ft 0 in)	80 kg (180 lb)	290 cm (110 in)	273 cm (107 in)	(Argentina) Estudiantes - La Plata
14	Julieta Holzmaisters	9 January 2002	1.78 m (5 ft 10 in)	59 kg (130 lb)	290 cm (110 in)	280 cm (110 in)	(Argentina) Boca Juniors

=== Belarus ===
The following is the Belarusian roster in the 2019 FIVB Girls' U18 World Championship.

Head coach: Dzmitry Kot

No.	Name	Date of birth	Height	Weight	Spike	Block	2019 club
1	Palina Shletsar	1 July 2002	1.72 m (5 ft 8 in)	64 kg (141 lb)	270 cm (110 in)	257 cm (101 in)	(Belarus) RGUOR MINSK
2	Yuliya Hrynevich	9 August 2002	1.75 m (5 ft 9 in)	62 kg (137 lb)	268 cm (106 in)	255 cm (100 in)	(Belarus) RGUOR MINSK
5	Kseniya Liabiodkina (c)	18 February 2002	1.82 m (6 ft 0 in)	70 kg (150 lb)	287 cm (113 in)	277 cm (109 in)	(Belarus) Minchanka-2 MINSK
6	Darya Burak	12 September 2002	1.88 m (6 ft 2 in)	72 kg (159 lb)	291 cm (115 in)	284 cm (112 in)	(Belarus) Zhemchuzhina Polessia MOZYR
7	Hanna Karabinovich	15 April 2003	1.84 m (6 ft 0 in)	65 kg (143 lb)	301 cm (119 in)	288 cm (113 in)	(Belarus) Zhemchuzhina Polessia MOZYR
9	Darya Sauchuk	13 July 2002	1.8 m (5 ft 11 in)	67 kg (148 lb)	274 cm (108 in)	265 cm (104 in)	(Belarus) Pribuzhie BREST
10	Anastasiya Shahun	1 November 2002	1.8 m (5 ft 11 in)	61 kg (134 lb)	286 cm (113 in)	273 cm (107 in)	(Belarus) Minchanka-2 MINSK
11	Lizaveta Bahayeva	3 September 2003	1.71 m (5 ft 7 in)	57 kg (126 lb)	267 cm (105 in)	256 cm (101 in)	(Belarus) Minchanka-2 MINSK
12	Darya Borys	12 March 2003	1.8 m (5 ft 11 in)	68 kg (150 lb)	278 cm (109 in)	270 cm (110 in)	(Belarus) Minchanka-2 MINSK
13	Viktoryia Kastsiuchyk	10 April 2002	1.78 m (5 ft 10 in)	67 kg (148 lb)	275 cm (108 in)	250 cm (98 in)	(Belarus) Kommunalnik-GrGU GRODNO
14	Darya Vakulka	7 June 2002	1.87 m (6 ft 2 in)	62 kg (137 lb)	287 cm (113 in)	276 cm (109 in)	(Belarus) Minchanka-2 MINSK
15	Emilia Mikanovich	24 November 2003	1.8 m (5 ft 11 in)	62 kg (137 lb)	279 cm (110 in)	268 cm (106 in)	(Belarus) Minchanka-2 MINSK

=== Romania ===
The following is the Romanian roster in the 2019 FIVB Girls' U18 World Championship.

Head coach: Marius Macarie

No.	Name	Date of birth	Height	Weight	Spike	Block	2019 club
2	Andra Elena Cojocaru	8 May 2002	1.6 m (5 ft 3 in)	54 kg (119 lb)	262 cm (103 in)	254 cm (100 in)	
3	Iarina Luana Axinte	16 June 2005	1.78 m (5 ft 10 in)	53 kg (117 lb)	284 cm (112 in)	270 cm (110 in)	(Romania) C.S.S. SIBIU
6	Andreea Cristina Murar	17 March 2002	1.67 m (5 ft 6 in)	52 kg (115 lb)	262 cm (103 in)	254 cm (100 in)	(Romania) L.P.S. CLUJ NAPOCA
7	Adriana-Valentina Alexandru	13 September 2002	1.83 m (6 ft 0 in)	63 kg (139 lb)	280 cm (110 in)	270 cm (110 in)	
10	Georgiana Florentina Popa	24 March 2003	1.8 m (5 ft 11 in)	58 kg (128 lb)	295 cm (116 in)	284 cm (112 in)	(Romania) C.S.S. LUGOJ
12	Patricia-Carina Barbulescu	26 July 2003	1.71 m (5 ft 7 in)	50 kg (110 lb)	270 cm (110 in)	260 cm (100 in)	(Romania) C.S.S. LUGOJ
13	Denisa Stefania Cheluta	6 April 2004	1.87 m (6 ft 2 in)	58 kg (128 lb)	302 cm (119 in)	290 cm (110 in)	(Romania) S.C. Juvenil N.Titulescu BRASOV
14	Alexia-Ioana Carutasu (c)	10 June 2003	1.83 m (6 ft 0 in)	54 kg (119 lb)	290 cm (110 in)	275 cm (108 in)	(Romania) C.S.M. BUCURESTI
15	Denisa Ioana Ionescu	8 July 2002	1.89 m (6 ft 2 in)	65 kg (143 lb)	290 cm (110 in)	280 cm (110 in)	(Romania) C.S.U. Medicina TIRGU MURES
16	Mara Dumitrescu	16 May 2002	1.79 m (5 ft 10 in)	65 kg (143 lb)	293 cm (115 in)	280 cm (110 in)	(Romania) C.S.U. Medicina TIRGU MURES
17	Francesca Ioana Alupei	3 January 2003	1.9 m (6 ft 3 in)	65 kg (143 lb)	290 cm (110 in)	280 cm (110 in)	(Romania) C.S.M. BUCURESTI
20	Florina Murariu	13 February 2002	1.8 m (5 ft 11 in)	82 kg (181 lb)	283 cm (111 in)	271 cm (107 in)	(Romania) C.S.U. Medicina TIRGU MURES

=== Russia ===
The following is the Russian roster in the 2019 FIVB Girls' U18 World Championship.

Head coach: Svetlana Safronova

No.	Name	Date of birth	Height	Weight	Spike	Block	2019 club
1	Elizaveta Kochurina	1 October 2002	1.89 m (6 ft 2 in)	78 kg (172 lb)	310 cm (120 in)	294 cm (116 in)	(Russia) WVC Dynamo Kazan
2	Valeriia Perova	30 August 2002	1.7 m (5 ft 7 in)	65 kg (143 lb)	275 cm (108 in)	254 cm (100 in)	(Russia) WVC Dynamo Kazan
4	Polina Matveeva	8 August 2002	1.88 m (6 ft 2 in)	69 kg (152 lb)	300 cm (120 in)	281 cm (111 in)	(Russia) WVC Dynamo Kazan
7	Elizaveta Gosheva (c)	23 May 2002	1.82 m (6 ft 0 in)	73 kg (161 lb)	288 cm (113 in)	269 cm (106 in)	(Russia) WVC Dynamo Kazan
8	Vita Akimova	16 July 2002	1.91 m (6 ft 3 in)	71 kg (157 lb)	312 cm (123 in)	301 cm (119 in)	(Russia) WVC Dynamo Kazan
9	Elizaveta Popova	7 June 2002	1.85 m (6 ft 1 in)	63 kg (139 lb)	298 cm (117 in)	291 cm (115 in)	(Russia) WVC Dynamo Kazan
10	Arina Fedorovtseva	19 January 2004	1.9 m (6 ft 3 in)	69 kg (152 lb)	311 cm (122 in)	300 cm (120 in)	(Russia) WVC Dynamo Kazan
11	Alexandra Murushkina	17 February 2002	1.82 m (6 ft 0 in)	65 kg (143 lb)	304 cm (120 in)	286 cm (113 in)	(Russia) WVC Dynamo Kazan
12	Natalia Suvorova	5 March 2004	1.89 m (6 ft 2 in)	65 kg (143 lb)	305 cm (120 in)	300 cm (120 in)	(Russia) Severyanka
15	Valeriia Gorbunova	21 March 2003	1.88 m (6 ft 2 in)	65 kg (143 lb)	305 cm (120 in)	297 cm (117 in)	(Russia) WVC Dynamo Kazan
16	Natalia Slautina	5 August 2002	1.98 m (6 ft 6 in)	78 kg (172 lb)	302 cm (119 in)	286 cm (113 in)	(Russia) WVC Dynamo Kazan
17	Tatiana Kadochkina	21 March 2003	1.92 m (6 ft 4 in)	77 kg (170 lb)	310 cm (120 in)	292 cm (115 in)	(Russia) WVC Dynamo Kazan

=== Thailand ===
The following is the Thai roster in the 2019 FIVB Girls' U18 World Championship.

Head coach: Kritideach Arjwichai

No.	Name	Date of birth	Height	Weight	Spike	Block	2017 club
1	Waranya Srilaoong	20 October 2002	1.73 m (5 ft 8 in)	62 kg (137 lb)	282 cm (111 in)	280 cm (110 in)	(Thailand) Ayutthaya Technological Commercial
2	Wiranyupa Inchan	23 May 2002	1.82 m (6 ft 0 in)	80 kg (180 lb)	290 cm (110 in)	287 cm (113 in)	(Thailand) Mengrai Maharaj Witthyakhom School
3	Orrakan Singkhan	24 May 2003	1.71 m (5 ft 7 in)	68 kg (150 lb)	280 cm (110 in)	278 cm (109 in)	(Thailand) Nakornnon Witthaya Sport 6 School
5	Jidapa Nahuanong	22 February 2002	1.66 m (5 ft 5 in)	54 kg (119 lb)	258 cm (102 in)	248 cm (98 in)	(Thailand) Nakornnon Witthaya Sport 6 School
7	Aungkana Pasang	11 July 2002	1.73 m (5 ft 8 in)	62 kg (137 lb)	282 cm (111 in)	280 cm (110 in)	(Thailand) Ayutthaya Technological Commercial
9	Amonrada Loeksawang	12 August 2002	1.76 m (5 ft 9 in)	66 kg (146 lb)	289 cm (114 in)	286 cm (113 in)	(Thailand) Ayutthaya Technological Commercial
11	Kewalin Chuemuangphan	7 July 2003	1.73 m (5 ft 8 in)	59 kg (130 lb)	281 cm (111 in)	279 cm (110 in)	(Thailand) Nakornnon Witthaya Sport 6 School
12	Pimtawan Thongyos	30 April 2002	1.71 m (5 ft 7 in)	60 kg (130 lb)	268 cm (106 in)	250 cm (98 in)	(Thailand) Ayutthaya Technological Commercial
13	Suphatcha Khamtrareaksa (c)	28 July 2002	1.77 m (5 ft 10 in)	75 kg (165 lb)	288 cm (113 in)	285 cm (112 in)	(Thailand) Nakornnon Witthaya Sport 6 School
15	Saowapha Soosuk	9 March 2002	1.73 m (5 ft 8 in)	59 kg (130 lb)	282 cm (111 in)	279 cm (110 in)	(Thailand) Nakornnon Witthaya Sport 6 School
16	Pajaree Maneesri	17 October 2002	1.74 m (5 ft 9 in)	78 kg (172 lb)	281 cm (111 in)	279 cm (110 in)	(Thailand) Angthong Sports School
18	Wimonrat Thanapan	2 April 2002	1.79 m (5 ft 10 in)	56 kg (123 lb)	289 cm (114 in)	283 cm (111 in)	(Thailand) Nakornnon Witthaya Sport 6 School

== Pool D ==
=== Bulgaria ===
The following is the Bulgarian roster in the 2019 FIVB Girls' U18 World Championship.

Head coach: Stoyan Gunchev

No.	Name	Date of birth	Height	Weight	Spike	Block	2019 club
1	Aleksandra Georgieva	15 February 2002	1.9 m (6 ft 3 in)	70 kg (150 lb)	300 cm (120 in)	290 cm (110 in)	(Bulgaria) Partizan
3	Selin Salim	31 December 2002	1.85 m (6 ft 1 in)	70 kg (150 lb)	290 cm (110 in)	280 cm (110 in)	(Bulgaria) Beroe
5	Maria Yordanova (c)	25 May 2002	1.81 m (5 ft 11 in)	72 kg (159 lb)	295 cm (116 in)	283 cm (111 in)	(Bulgaria) Levski
6	Galina Karabasheva	6 August 2002	1.66 m (5 ft 5 in)	54 kg (119 lb)	272 cm (107 in)	255 cm (100 in)	(Bulgaria) Levski
7	Joanna Atanasova	24 July 2003	1.8 m (5 ft 11 in)	62 kg (137 lb)	285 cm (112 in)	270 cm (110 in)	(Bulgaria) Levski
9	Borislava Licheva	6 November 2003	1.68 m (5 ft 6 in)	53 kg (117 lb)	275 cm (108 in)	265 cm (104 in)	(Bulgaria) Levski
10	Aleksandra Saykova	22 July 2003	1.85 m (6 ft 1 in)	70 kg (150 lb)	285 cm (112 in)	275 cm (108 in)	(Bulgaria) CSKA
11	Tanya Trendafilova	28 July 2003	1.84 m (6 ft 0 in)	59 kg (130 lb)	285 cm (112 in)	275 cm (108 in)	(Bulgaria) Maritza Plovdiv
13	Merelin Nikolova	17 May 2003	1.8 m (5 ft 11 in)	56 kg (123 lb)	285 cm (112 in)	275 cm (108 in)	(Bulgaria) Bdin Vidin
16	Mila Pashkuleva	6 September 2003	1.75 m (5 ft 9 in)	60 kg (130 lb)	270 cm (110 in)	260 cm (100 in)	(Bulgaria) Maritza Plovdiv
18	Mila Ilieva	19 June 2002	1.84 m (6 ft 0 in)	65 kg (143 lb)	285 cm (112 in)	275 cm (108 in)	(Bulgaria) Bdin Vidin
19	Natali Stanoeva	1 June 2002	1.75 m (5 ft 9 in)	56 kg (123 lb)	275 cm (108 in)	270 cm (110 in)	(Bulgaria) Slavia

=== DR Congo ===
The following is the Congo roster in the 2019 FIVB Girls' U18 World Championship.

Head coach: Hamid Abdellaoui Maan

No.	Name	Date of birth	Height	Weight	Spike	Block	2019 club
1	Benie Nlevo Landlu	27 December 2002	1.7 m (5 ft 7 in)	63 kg (139 lb)	241 cm (95 in)	232 cm (91 in)	(Democratic Republic of the Congo) VOLLEYBALL VITA
3	Benedicte Tetila Monge (c)	4 January 2002	1.71 m (5 ft 7 in)	58 kg (128 lb)	240 cm (94 in)	228 cm (90 in)	
4	Irene Mpeti Lelo	29 November 2005	1.7 m (5 ft 7 in)	61 kg (134 lb)	239 cm (94 in)	238 cm (94 in)	
6	Dorcas Mianda Ania	23 March 2002	1.71 m (5 ft 7 in)	68 kg (150 lb)	241 cm (95 in)	232 cm (91 in)	
7	Mavie Ngundu Mpata	18 July 2002	1.83 m (6 ft 0 in)	64 kg (141 lb)	246 cm (97 in)	240 cm (94 in)	
9	Grace Soki Menga	6 March 2002	1.77 m (5 ft 10 in)	69 kg (152 lb)	247 cm (97 in)	239 cm (94 in)	
10	Faida Bakanke	27 March 2002	1.68 m (5 ft 6 in)	52 kg (115 lb)	239 cm (94 in)	229 cm (90 in)	
11	Souzane Beya Sheka	9 March 2002	1.76 m (5 ft 9 in)	63 kg (139 lb)	247 cm (97 in)	234 cm (92 in)	
12	Christine Zenga Abala Christine Grace	24 June 2002	1.75 m (5 ft 9 in)	68 kg (150 lb)	248 cm (98 in)	245 cm (96 in)	
14	Christelle Makiese Ndongo	16 November 2004	1.69 m (5 ft 7 in)	62 kg (137 lb)	237 cm (93 in)	231 cm (91 in)	
15	Nathalie Bijimine Kutekemenyi	23 February 2002	1.73 m (5 ft 8 in)	70 kg (150 lb)	240 cm (94 in)	231 cm (91 in)	
16	Dorcas Nkunimbe Masiyo	7 July 2002	1.74 m (5 ft 9 in)	71 kg (157 lb)	236 cm (93 in)	230 cm (91 in)	

=== Japan ===
The following is the Japanese roster in the 2019 FIVB Girls' U18 World Championship.

Head coach: Daichi Saegusa

No.	Name	Date of birth	Height	Weight	Spike	Block	2019 club
1	Yoshino Sato	30 June 2002	1.83 m (6 ft 0 in)	73 kg (161 lb)	291 cm (115 in)	277 cm (109 in)	(Japan) Yonezawa Chuo High School
4	Yoshino Nishikawa	10 September 2002	1.78 m (5 ft 10 in)	62 kg (137 lb)	289 cm (114 in)	279 cm (110 in)	(Japan) Kinrankai High School
5	Mika Yoshitake	20 April 2003	1.8 m (5 ft 11 in)	69 kg (152 lb)	295 cm (116 in)	282 cm (111 in)	(Japan) Kinrankai High School
6	Natsumi Kondo	12 June 2002	1.71 m (5 ft 7 in)	65 kg (143 lb)	285 cm (112 in)	267 cm (105 in)	(Japan) Hikami High School
7	Ai Hirota	23 August 2003	1.73 m (5 ft 8 in)	66 kg (146 lb)	300 cm (120 in)	285 cm (112 in)	(Japan) Bunkyo Gakuin Univ. Girls HS
8	Manami Koyama	29 July 2002	1.76 m (5 ft 9 in)	67 kg (148 lb)	288 cm (113 in)	277 cm (109 in)	(Japan) Kyoei Gakuen Senior HS
9	Yukiko Wada (c)	8 January 2002	1.75 m (5 ft 9 in)	55 kg (121 lb)	293 cm (115 in)	277 cm (109 in)	(Japan) Kyoto Tachibana High School
10	Yoshie Kawakami	23 September 2002	1.74 m (5 ft 9 in)	63 kg (139 lb)	286 cm (113 in)	278 cm (109 in)	(Japan) Kinrankai High School
11	Haruka Kaji	24 March 2003	1.72 m (5 ft 8 in)	61 kg (134 lb)	284 cm (112 in)	276 cm (109 in)	(Japan) Sundai Gakuen High School
12	Madoka Kashimura	6 November 2002	1.83 m (6 ft 0 in)	71 kg (157 lb)	305 cm (120 in)	299 cm (118 in)	(Japan) Mito Girls' High School
18	Rino Murooka	16 June 2002	1.61 m (5 ft 3 in)	55 kg (121 lb)	295 cm (116 in)	286 cm (113 in)	(Japan) Higashi-Kyushu Ryukoku HS
19	Mana Nishizaki	1 May 2002	1.58 m (5 ft 2 in)	57 kg (126 lb)	254 cm (100 in)	251 cm (99 in)	(Japan) Kinrankai High School

=== Peru ===
The following is the Peruvian roster in the 2019 FIVB Girls' U18 World Championship.

Head coach: Natalia Málaga Dibós

No.	Name	Date of birth	Height	Weight	Spike	Block	2019 club
1	Yadhira Anchante (c)	19 November 2002	1.78 m (5 ft 10 in)	59 kg (130 lb)	286 cm (113 in)	290 cm (110 in)	(Peru) Túpac Amaru
2	Carolina Takahashi Omote	18 September 2002	1.77 m (5 ft 10 in)	68 kg (150 lb)	281 cm (111 in)	270 cm (110 in)	
4	Maria Jose Rojas	12 July 2003	1.75 m (5 ft 9 in)	67 kg (148 lb)	275 cm (108 in)	260 cm (100 in)	(Peru) Alianza Lima
6	Janelly Sarita Ceopa Dongo	30 March 2002	1.75 m (5 ft 9 in)	65 kg (143 lb)	285 cm (112 in)	270 cm (110 in)	(Peru) Tupac Amaru
9	Camila Nicolle Perez Rivas	2 September 2002	1.8 m (5 ft 11 in)	60 kg (130 lb)	291 cm (115 in)	275 cm (108 in)	
10	Maria Lopez Torres	7 May 2002	1.75 m (5 ft 9 in)	68 kg (150 lb)	281 cm (111 in)	280 cm (110 in)	(Peru) CRISTAL
13	Andrea Francesca Calderon Rios	2 October 2002	1.64 m (5 ft 5 in)	60 kg (130 lb)	265 cm (104 in)	250 cm (98 in)	(Peru) Sporting Cristal
15	Carolina Brunella Milla Romero	2 December 2002	1.76 m (5 ft 9 in)	57 kg (126 lb)	276 cm (109 in)	266 cm (105 in)	(Peru) Alianza Lima
16	Lizanyela Lopez Linares	21 April 2003	1.87 m (6 ft 2 in)	60 kg (130 lb)	295 cm (116 in)	285 cm (112 in)	(Peru) Sporting Cristal
19	Antuanett Arteaga	15 May 2003	1.75 m (5 ft 9 in)	70 kg (150 lb)	280 cm (110 in)	265 cm (104 in)	(Peru) Geminis
20	Alondra Alarcon	24 September 2004	1.75 m (5 ft 9 in)	0 kg (0 lb)	280 cm (110 in)	265 cm (104 in)	(Peru) Tupac Amaru
22	Thaisa Mc Leod	1 January 2002	1.89 m (6 ft 2 in)	75 kg (165 lb)	301 cm (119 in)	305 cm (120 in)	(Peru) Club Sporting Cristal

=== Turkey ===
The following is the Turkish roster in the 2019 FIVB Girls' U18 World Championship.

Head coach: Çatma Şahin

No.	Name	Date of birth	Height	Weight	Spike	Block	2019 club
1	Hilal Kocakara	1 January 2002	1.79 m (5 ft 10 in)	63 kg (139 lb)	295 cm (116 in)	278 cm (109 in)	(Turkey) Fenerbahce
4	Derin Ezgi Tasdemir	20 July 2002	1.86 m (6 ft 1 in)	71 kg (157 lb)	297 cm (117 in)	277 cm (109 in)	(Turkey) ECZACIBAŞI
5	İpar Kurt	10 November 2003	1.86 m (6 ft 1 in)	69 kg (152 lb)	305 cm (120 in)	290 cm (110 in)	(Turkey) Fenerbahce
7	Elif Su Eriçek	16 December 2002	1.8 m (5 ft 11 in)	72 kg (159 lb)	300 cm (120 in)	290 cm (110 in)	(Turkey) Galatasaray
8	Çağla Salih (c)	5 April 2002	1.79 m (5 ft 10 in)	68 kg (150 lb)	298 cm (117 in)	285 cm (112 in)	(Turkey) Galatasaray
9	Sabire Karacaova	5 July 2002	1.78 m (5 ft 10 in)	63 kg (139 lb)	290 cm (110 in)	280 cm (110 in)	(Turkey) Fenerbahce
10	Dalia Wilson	28 October 2004	1.91 m (6 ft 3 in)	79 kg (174 lb)	315 cm (124 in)	293 cm (115 in)	(Turkey) ECZACIBAŞI
11	Hanife Nur Özaydinli	1 November 2002	1.88 m (6 ft 2 in)	70 kg (150 lb)	294 cm (116 in)	283 cm (111 in)	(Turkey) TVF SPOR LİSESİ VOLEYBOL İHT.
14	Pelin Eroktay	14 November 2004	1.56 m (5 ft 1 in)	71 kg (157 lb)	297 cm (117 in)	277 cm (109 in)	(Turkey) ECZACIBAŞI
16	Damla Tokman	2 April 2002	1.87 m (6 ft 2 in)	67 kg (148 lb)	290 cm (110 in)	280 cm (110 in)	(Turkey) Eczacibasi
18	Aleyna Göçmen	1 June 2004	1.88 m (6 ft 2 in)	68 kg (150 lb)	289 cm (114 in)	272 cm (107 in)	(Turkey) VAKIFBANK
21	Gülce Güçtekin	10 October 2002	1.67 m (5 ft 6 in)	55 kg (121 lb)	275 cm (108 in)	270 cm (110 in)	(Turkey) Fenerbahce
