= Girls' Youth Pan-American Volleyball Cup =

Recurring volleyball competition

- Current season, competition or edition: 2025 Girls' U19 NORCECA Pan American Cup
- Sport: Volleyball
- Founded: 2011; 15 years ago
- First season: 2011
- No. of teams: 7
- Continent: Pan American (NORCECA)
- Most recent champions: United States (3rd title)
- Most titles: United States (3 titles)

The Girls' Youth Pan-American Volleyball Cup is a bi-annual Continental Cup organized by NORCECA for U19 teams from all over America (North-, South- and Central America, and the Caribbean)

== History ==
Pan-American Cup
Year	Host	Champion	Runner-up	3rd Place
2011; Details	Tijuana, Mexico	Argentina	Mexico	Dominican Republic
2013; Details	Guatemala City, Guatemala	Brazil	Puerto Rico	Dominican Republic
2015; Details	Habana, Cuba	Argentina	Dominican Republic	Cuba
2017; Details	Habana, Cuba	Colombia	Cuba	Dominican Republic
2019; Details	Durango City, Mexico	Peru	Puerto Rico	Mexico
2022; Details	Tulsa, Oklahoma, United States	United States	Brazil	Dominican Republic
2023; Details	Juana Diaz, Puerto Rico	United States	Mexico	Puerto Rico
2025; Details	Kingston, Ontario, Canada	United States	Mexico	Canada

== Medal table ==
Rank	Nation	Gold	Silver	Bronze	Total
1	United States	3	0	0	3
2	Argentina	2	0	0	2
3	Brazil	1	1	0	2
4	Colombia	1	0	0	1
4	Peru	1	0	0	1
6	Mexico	0	3	1	4
7	Puerto Rico	0	2	1	3
8	Dominican Republic	0	1	4	5
9	Cuba	0	1	1	2
10	Canada	0	0	1	1
Totals (10 entries)		8	8	8	24

== Participating nations ==
Nation	(Mexico) 2011	(Guatemala) 2013	(Cuba) 2015	(Cuba) 2017	(Mexico) 2019	(United States) 2022	(Puerto Rico) 2023	(Canada) 2025	Years
Argentina	1st	4th	1st	4th	–	–	–	–	4
Brazil	–	1st	–	–	–	2nd	–	–	2
Canada	–	–	–	–	–	6th	6th	3rd	3
Chile	6th	5th	7th	6th	4th	–	–	–	5
Colombia	–	7th	–	1st	–	–	–	–	2
Costa Rica	7th	–	8th	8th	–	8th	4th	7th	6
Cuba	–	–	3rd	2nd	5th	–	–	–	3
Dominican Republic	3rd	3rd	2nd	3rd	6th	3rd	5th	4th	8
El Salvador	8th	–	–	–	–	–	–	–	1
Guatemala	–	8th	–	10th	7th	–	–	–	3
Honduras	–	–	–	–	8th	–	8th	–	2
Mexico	2nd	–	6th	5th	3rd	5th	2nd	2nd	7
Peru	4th	6th	5th	–	1st	7th	–	–	5
Puerto Rico	5th	2nd	4th	7th	2nd	4th	3rd	6th	8
United States	–	–	–	–	–	1st	1st	1st	3
Uruguay	–	–	–	9th	–	–	–	–	1
U.S. Virgin Islands	–	–	–	–	–	–	7th	–	1
Venezuela	–	–	–	–	–	–	–	5th	1
Total	8	8	8	10	8	8	8	7	

== See also ==
- Women's Pan-American Volleyball Cup
- Women's Junior Pan-American Volleyball Cup
- Boys' Youth Pan-American Volleyball Cup
