= United States women's national under-19 volleyball team =

United States U19
- Association: USA Volleyball
- Confederation: NORCECA

Uniforms
| Home | Away |

Youth Olympic Games
- Appearances: 1 (First in 2010)
- Best result: Silver : (2010)

FIVB U19 World Championship
- Appearances: 14 (First in 1989)
- Best result: Champions : (2019, 2023)

Girls' U19 NORCECA Continental Championship
- Appearances: 13 (First in 1998)
- Best result: (gold) Gold : (1998, 2002, 2004, 2006, 2008, 2010, 2012, 2018, 2024, 2026)
- www.usavolleyball.org
Honours
Youth Olympic Games
| Silver medal – second place | 2010 Singapore | Team |
FIVB Girls' U19 World Championship
| Gold medal – first place | 2019 Egypt | Team |
| Gold medal – first place | 2023 Croatia-Hungary | Team |
| Silver medal – second place | 2013 Thailand | Team |
| Silver medal – second place | 2015 Peru | Team |
| Silver medal – second place | 2025 Croatia-Serbia | Team |
| Bronze medal – third place | 2021 Mexico | Team |
Girls' U19 NORCECA Continental Championship
| Gold medal – first place | 1998 Puerto Rico | Team |
| Gold medal – first place | 2002 United States | Team |
| Gold medal – first place | 2004 Puerto Rico | Team |
| Gold medal – first place | 2006 United States | Team |
| Gold medal – first place | 2008 Puerto Rico | Team |
| Gold medal – first place | 2010 Guatemala | Team |
| Gold medal – first place | 2012 Mexico | Team |
| Gold medal – first place | 2018 Honduras | Team |
| Gold medal – first place | 2024 Honduras | Team |
| Gold medal – first place | 2026 Costa Rica | Team |
| Silver medal – second place | 2000 Dominican Republic | Team |
| Silver medal – second place | 2014 Costa Rica | Team |
| Silver medal – second place | 2016 Puerto Rico | Team |
Girls' U19 NORCECA Pan American Cup
| Gold medal – first place | 2022 United States | Team |
| Gold medal – first place | 2023 Puerto Rico | Team |
| Gold medal – first place | 2025 Canada | Team |

The United States women's national under-19 volleyball team represents the United States in international women's volleyball competitions and friendly matches under the age 19 and it is ruled by the American Volleyball Federation USAV body That is an affiliate of International Volleyball Federation FIVB and also a part of North, Central America and Caribbean Volleyball Confederation NORCECA.

== Results ==
=== Summer Youth Olympics ===
Champions Runners up Third place Fourth place

Youth Olympic Games
| Year | Round | Position | Pld | W | L | SW | SL | Squad |
|---|---|---|---|---|---|---|---|---|
| (Singapore) 2010 | Final | Silver | 4 | 3 | 1 | 10 | 5 | Squad |
| (China) 2014 | No Volleyball Event | | | | | | | |
| (Argentina) 2018 | No Volleyball Event | | | | | | | |
| Total | 0 Titles | 1/1 | 4 | 3 | 1 | 10 | 5 | —N/a |

=== FIVB Girls' U19 World Championship ===
Champions Runners up Third place Fourth place

FIVB Girls' U19 World Championship
| Year | Round | Position | Pld | W | L | SW | SL | Squad |
|---|---|---|---|---|---|---|---|---|
| (Brazil) 1989 | First round | 9th place | 5 | 2 | 3 | 8 | 9 | Squad |
| (Portugal) 1991 | Didn't Qualify | | | | | | | |
| (Czechoslovakia) 1993 | Didn't Qualify | | | | | | | |
| (France) 1995 | Didn't Qualify | | | | | | | |
| (Thailand) 1997 | Didn't Qualify | | | | | | | |
| (Portugal) 1999 | Quarterfinals | 6th place | 7 | 4 | 3 | 14 | 12 | Squad |
| (Croatia) 2001 | Didn't Qualify | | | | | | | |
| (Poland) 2003 | Semifinals | Fourth place | 7 | 4 | 3 | 13 | 12 | Squad |
| (Macau) 2005 | Semifinals | Fourth place | 7 | 5 | 2 | 18 | 8 | Squad |
| (Mexico) 2007 | First round | 10th place | 8 | 3 | 5 | 10 | 15 | Squad |
| (Thailand) 2009 | First round | 12th place | 8 | 2 | 6 | 9 | 20 | Squad |
| (Turkey) 2011 | First round | 9th place | 8 | 6 | 2 | 19 | 6 | Squad |
| (Thailand) 2013 | Final | Runners Up | 8 | 6 | 2 | 19 | 8 | Squad |
| (Peru) 2015 | Final | Runners Up | 8 | 6 | 2 | 20 | 8 | Squad |
| (Argentina) 2017 | Quarterfinals | 8th place | 8 | 3 | 5 | 12 | 19 | Squad |
| (Egypt) 2019 | Final | Champions | 8 | 7 | 1 | 23 | 6 | Squad |
| (Mexico) 2021 | Semifinals | Third Place | 8 | 7 | 1 | 21 | 9 | Squad |
| (Croatia) (Hungary) 2023 | Final | Champions | 9 | 9 | 0 | 27 | 10 | Squad |
| (Croatia) (Serbia) 2025 | Final | Runners Up | 9 | 6 | 3 | 23 | 15 | Squad |
| 2027 | Qualified | | | | | | | Squad |
| Total | 2 Titles | 14/20 | 108 | 70 | 38 | 236 | 157 | —N/a |

=== Girls U19 NORCECA Continental Championship ===
Champions Runners up Third place Fourth place

Girls' U19 NORCECA Continental Championship
| Year | Round | Position | Pld | W | L | SW | SL | Squad |
|---|---|---|---|---|---|---|---|---|
| (Puerto Rico) 1998 | Final | Gold | 5 | 5 | 0 | 15 | 4 | Squad |
| (Dominican Republic) 2000 | Final | Silver | 5 | 3 | 2 | 9 | 8 | Squad |
| (United States) 2002 | Final | Gold | 4 | 4 | 0 | 12 | 1 | Squad |
| (Puerto Rico) 2004 | Final | Gold | 4 | 4 | 0 | 12 | 2 | Squad |
| (United States) 2006 | Final | Gold | 6 | 6 | 0 | 18 | 3 | Squad |
| (Puerto Rico) 2008 | Final | Gold | 5 | 5 | 0 | 15 | 0 | Squad |
| (Guatemala) 2010 | Final | Gold | 5 | 5 | 0 | 15 | 1 | Squad |
| (Mexico) 2012 | Final | Gold | 5 | 5 | 0 | 15 | 2 | Squad |
| (Costa Rica) 2014 | Final | Silver | 4 | 3 | 1 | 10 | 3 | Squad |
| (Puerto Rico) 2016 | Final | Silver | 5 | 4 | 1 | 14 | 7 | Squad |
| (Honduras) 2018 | Final | Gold | 5 | 5 | 0 | 15 | 0 | Squad |
| (Honduras) 2024 | Final | Gold | 5 | 5 | 0 | 15 | 1 | Squad |
| (Costa Rica) 2026 | Final | Gold | 4 | 4 | 0 | 12 | 0 | Squad |
| Total | 10 Titles | 13/13 | 62 | 58 | 4 | 177 | 32 | —N/a |

=== Girls' U19 NORCECA Pan American Cup ===
Champions Runners up Third place Fourth place

Girls' U19 NORCECA Pan American Cup
| Year | Round | Position | Pld | W | L | SW | SL | Squad |
|---|---|---|---|---|---|---|---|---|
| (Mexico) 2011 | Didn't participate | | | | | | | |
| (Guatemala) 2013 | Didn't participate | | | | | | | |
| (Cuba) 2015 | Didn't participate | | | | | | | |
| (Cuba) 2017 | Didn't participate | | | | | | | |
| (Mexico) 2019 | Didn't participate | | | | | | | |
| (United States) 2022 | Final | Champions | 5 | 5 | 0 | 15 | 0 | Squad |
| (Puerto Rico) 2023 | Final | Champions | 5 | 5 | 0 | 15 | 0 | Squad |
| (Canada) 2025 | Final | Champions | 5 | 5 | 0 | 15 | 1 | Squad |
| Total | 3 Titles | 3/8 | 15 | 15 | 0 | 45 | 1 | —N/a |

== Team ==
=== Current squad ===
The following is the American roster in the 2026 Girls U19 NORCECA Continental Championship.

Head coach: Alex Dunphy

| No. | Name | Date of birth | Height | Weight | Spike | Block | School / Club |
|---|---|---|---|---|---|---|---|
| 1 | Taimane Ainu’u | | 1.84 m (6 ft 0 in) | | | | (United States) Iolani HS |
| 2 | Nejari Crooks | | 1.86 m (6 ft 1 in) | | | | (United States) Wesleyan Christian Academy |
| 3 | Cala Haffner | | 1.72 m (5 ft 8 in) | | | | (United States) Carroll HS |
| 5 | Olivia Henry | | 1.95 m (6 ft 5 in) | | | | (United States) IMG Academy |
| 6 | Megan Hodges | | 1.95 m (6 ft 5 in) | | | | (United States) San Juan Hills HS |
| 9 | Pulelehua Laikona | | 1.72 m (5 ft 8 in) | | | | (United States) Mesa HS |
| 12 | Brynn Stephens | | 1.91 m (6 ft 3 in) | | | | (United States) Walnut Grove HS |
| 13 | Shayla Rautenberg | | 1.93 m (6 ft 4 in) | | | | (United States) Milford HS |
| 14 | Ireland Real | | 1.93 m (6 ft 4 in) | | | | (United States) Santa Margarita Catholic HS |
| 15 | Josalyn Samuels | | 1.86 m (6 ft 1 in) | | | | (United States) Harrisburg HS |
| 17 | Sarah Floyd | | 1.91 m (6 ft 3 in) | | | | (United States) Highland Park HS |
| 18 | Kyla Williams | | 1.93 m (6 ft 4 in) | | | | (United States) Gilmour Academy |
| 19 | Ava Burgess | | 1.88 m (6 ft 2 in) | | | | (United States) Lone Peak HS |
| 20 | Willtrace Ngoh | | 1.86 m (6 ft 1 in) | | | | (United States) Katy Seven Lakes HS |

== Notable players ==
- Micha Hancock
- Megan Hodge
- Rachael Adams
- Jordan Larson
- Nicole Fawcett
