= 2008 Girls' Youth NORCECA Volleyball Championship =

Tournament details
- Host country: (Puerto Rico) Guaynabo
- Dates: 5–10 July 2008
- Teams: 7
- Venue: 1 (in 1 host city)

Final positions
- Champions: United States (5th title)

The 2008 Girls' Youth NORCECA Volleyball Championship was played from 5 to 10 July 2008 in Guaynabo, Puerto Rico. Seven teams competed in this tournament. United States won the tournament for the fifth time defeating Mexico. Dominican Republic joined the United States and Mexico to compete at the 2009 Girls' U18 World Championship.

== Competing nations ==
Group A	Group B
Mexico; Puerto Rico; Costa Rica	United States; Dominican Republic; Trinidad and Tobago; U.S. Virgin Islands

== Preliminary round ==
- All times are in Atlantic Standard Time (UTC−04:00)

=== Group A ===
Pos	Team	Pld	W	L	Pts	SW	SL	SR	SPW	SPL	SPR	
1	Mexico	1	1	0	2	3	0	MAX	75	36	2.083	Advances to semifinals
2	Puerto Rico	1	1	0	2	3	0	MAX	75	49	1.531	Advances to quarterfinals
3	Costa Rica	2	0	2	2	0	6	0.000	85	150	0.567	

Date	Time		Score		Set 1	Set 2	Set 3	Set 4	Set 5	Total	Report
5-JULY	20:00	Puerto Rico	3–0	Costa Rica	25–20	25–7	25–22			75–49	
6-JULY	20:00	Costa Rica	0–3	Mexico	12–25	9–25	15–25			36–75	
7-JULY	20:00	Puerto Rico	1–3	Mexico	15–25	10–25	25–18	16–25		66–93	

=== Group B ===
Pos	Team	Pld	W	L	Pts	SW	SL	SR	SPW	SPL	SPR	
1	United States	2	2	0	4	6	0	MAX	150	81	1.852	Advances to semifinals
2	Dominican Republic	2	1	1	3	3	3	1.000	129	93	1.387	Advances to quarterfinals
3	Trinidad and Tobago	2	1	1	3	3	4	0.750	123	139	0.885	Advances to quarterfinals
4	U.S. Virgin Islands	2	0	2	2	1	6	0.167	82	171	0.480	

Date	Time		Score		Set 1	Set 2	Set 3	Set 4	Set 5	Total	Report
5-JULY	16:00	Trinidad and Tobago	3–1	U.S. Virgin Islands	21–25	25–17	25–13	25–9		96–64	
5-JULY	18:00	Dominican Republic	0–3	United States	22–25	17–25	15–25			54–75	
6-JULY	16:00	United States	3–0	Trinidad and Tobago	25–8	25–11	25–8			75–27	
6-JULY	18:00	U.S. Virgin Islands	0–3	Dominican Republic	6–25	3–25	9–25			18–75	
7-JULY	16:00	Dominican Republic	3–0	Trinidad and Tobago	25–3	25–6	25–7			75–16	
7-JULY	18:00	United States	3–0	U.S. Virgin Islands	25–7	25–7	25–7			75–21	

== Final round ==
=== Championship bracket ===
Quarterfinals
B2	Dominican Republic	3
A3	Costa Rica	0
A2	Puerto Rico	3
B3	Trinidad and Tobago	0

Semifinals
B2	Dominican Republic	0
A1	Mexico	3
A2	Puerto Rico	0
B1	United States	3

Finals
A1	Mexico	0
B1	United States	3
Third place
B2	Dominican Republic	3
A2	Puerto Rico	1

=== Quarterfinals ===
Date	Time		Score		Set 1	Set 2	Set 3	Set 4	Set 5	Total	Report
8-JULY	18:00	Dominican Republic	3–0	Costa Rica	25–14	25–15	25–13			75–42	
8-JULY	20:00	Puerto Rico	3–0	Trinidad and Tobago	25–12	25–12	25–18			75–42	

=== 6/7 classification ===
Date	Time		Score		Set 1	Set 2	Set 3	Set 4	Set 5	Total	Report
10-JULY	14:00	Trinidad and Tobago		U.S. Virgin Islands	25–17	25–21	17–25	25–20		92–83	

=== Fifth place match ===
Date	Time		Score		Set 1	Set 2	Set 3	Set 4	Set 5	Total	Report
9-JULY	16:00	Costa Rica	3–0	Trinidad and Tobago	25–13	25–9	25–16			75–38	

=== Semifinals ===
Date	Time		Score		Set 1	Set 2	Set 3	Set 4	Set 5	Total	Report
9-JULY	18:00	United States	3–0	Puerto Rico	25–20	25–14	25–20			75–54	
9-JULY	20:00	Mexico	0–3	Dominican Republic	20–25	25–21	25–19	26–24		96–89	

=== Bronze medal match ===
Date	Time		Score		Set 1	Set 2	Set 3	Set 4	Set 5	Total	Report
10-JULY	20:00	Dominican Republic	3–1	Puerto Rico	25–12	22–25	25–14	25–23		97–74	

=== Final ===
Date	Time		Score		Set 1	Set 2	Set 3	Set 4	Set 5	Total	Report
10-JULY	16:00	United States	3–0	Mexico	25–17	25–14	25–20			75–51	

== Final standing ==
Rank	Team
1st place, gold medalist(s)	United States
2nd place, silver medalist(s)	Mexico
3rd place, bronze medalist(s)	Dominican Republic
4	Puerto Rico
5	Costa Rica
6	Trinidad and Tobago
7	U.S. Virgin Islands

Qualified for FIVB U18 World Championship

2008 Girls' Youth NORCECA Championship

United States
5th title
