= 2006 Girls' Youth NORCECA Volleyball Championship =

Tournament details
- Host country: (United States) Gainesville, Florida
- Dates: 23 – 31 July 2006
- Teams: 6
- Venue: 1 (in 1 host city)

Final positions
- Champions: United States (4th title)

Tournament awards
- MVP: Tarrah Murrey (USA)

The 2006 Girls' Youth NORCECA Volleyball Championship was played from July 23 to July 31, 2006, in Gainesville, Florida, United States. Six teams competed in this tournament. United States won the tournament for the fourth time defeating Dominican Republic. Puerto Rico joined the United States and Dominican Republic to compete at the 2007 Girls' U18 World Championship. Team USA's Tarah Murrey won the tournament MVP award.

== Competing nations ==
Group A

United States
Dominican Republic
Puerto Rico
Canada
Mexico
Honduras

== Preliminary round ==
- All times are in Atlantic Standard Time (UTC−04:00)

=== Group A ===
| Pos | Team | Pld | W | L | Pts | SW | SL | SR | SPW | SPL | SPR | |
|---|---|---|---|---|---|---|---|---|---|---|---|---|
| 1 | United States | 5 | 5 | 0 | 10 | 15 | 3 | 5.000 | 331 | 288 | 1.149 | Advances to semifinals |
| 2 | Dominican Republic | 5 | 4 | 1 | 9 | 14 | 8 | 1.750 | 477 | 361 | 1.321 | Advances to semifinals |
| 3 | Canada | 5 | 3 | 2 | 8 | 11 | 8 | 1.375 | 437 | 395 | 1.106 | Advances to semifinals |
| 4 | Puerto Rico | 5 | 2 | 3 | 7 | 9 | 9 | 1.000 | 371 | 350 | 1.060 | Advances to semifinals |
| 5 | Mexico | 5 | 1 | 4 | 6 | 6 | 12 | 0.500 | 365 | 393 | 0.929 | |
| 6 | Honduras | 5 | 0 | 5 | 5 | 0 | 15 | 0.000 | 181 | 375 | 0.483 | |

| Date | Time | | Score | | Set 1 | Set 2 | Set 3 | Set 4 | Set 5 | Total | Report |
|---|---|---|---|---|---|---|---|---|---|---|---|
| 25-Jul | 14:30 | Mexico | 1–3 | Canada | 23–25 | 25–19 | 18–25 | 22–25 | | 88–94 | |
| 25-Jul | 17:30 | Puerto Rico | 2–3 | Dominican Republic | 25–15 | 25–20 | 20–25 | 18–25 | 11–15 | 99–100 | |
| 25-Jul | 19:30 | United States | 3–0 | Honduras | 25–14 | 25–9 | 25–10 | | | 75–33 | |
| 26-Jul | 14:30 | Honduras | 0–3 | Dominican Republic | 16–25 | 22–25 | 13–25 | | | 51–75 | |
| 26-Jul | 17:30 | Puerto Rico | 1–3 | Canada | 25–21 | 18–25 | 23–25 | 17–25 | | 83–96 | |
| 26-Jul | 19:30 | Mexico | 0–3 | United States | 14–25 | 14–25 | 18–25 | | | 46–75 | |
| 27-Jul | 14:30 | Mexico | 3–0 | Honduras | 25–6 | 25–14 | 25–12 | | | 75–32 | |
| 27-Jul | 17:30 | Dominican Republic | 3–1 | Canada | 25–23 | 18–25 | 26–24 | 25–21 | | 94–93 | |
| 27-Jul | 19:30 | United States | 3–0 | Puerto Rico | 25–13 | 25–14 | 25–12 | | | 75–39 | |
| 28-Jul | 14:30 | Puerto Rico | 3–0 | Honduras | 25–9 | 25–8 | 25–14 | | | 75–31 | |
| 28-Jul | 17:30 | Mexico | 2–3 | Dominican Republic | 25–22 | 19–25 | 21–25 | 32–30 | 11–15 | 108–117 | |
| 28-Jul | 19:30 | United States | 3–1 | Canada | 25–18 | 25–18 | 21–25 | 21–25 | 25–18 | 117–104 | |
| 29-Jul | 14:30 | Canada | 3–0 | Honduras | 25–14 | 25–13 | 25–7 | | | 75–34 | |
| 29-Jul | 17:30 | Mexico | 0–3 | Puerto Rico | 14–25 | 16–25 | 18–25 | | | 48–75 | |
| 29-Jul | 19:30 | United States | 3–2 | Dominican Republic | 25–10 | 19–25 | 25–20 | 25–27 | 15–9 | 109–91 | |

== Final round ==
=== Fifth place match ===
| Date | Time | | Score | | Set 1 | Set 2 | Set 3 | Set 4 | Set 5 | Total | Report |
|---|---|---|---|---|---|---|---|---|---|---|---|
| 30-Jul | 14:30 | Mexico | 3–0 | Honduras | 25–14 | 25–14 | 25–14 | | | 75–42 | |

=== Bronze medal match ===
| Date | Time | | Score | | Set 1 | Set 2 | Set 3 | Set 4 | Set 5 | Total | Report |
|---|---|---|---|---|---|---|---|---|---|---|---|
| 30-Jul | 17:30 | Canada | 0–3 | Puerto Rico | 23–25 | 20–25 | 25–27 | | | 68–77 | |

=== Final ===
| Date | Time | | Score | | Set 1 | Set 2 | Set 3 | Set 4 | Set 5 | Total | Report |
|---|---|---|---|---|---|---|---|---|---|---|---|
| 30-Jul | 19:30 | United States | 3–0 | Dominican Republic | 25–13 | 25–22 | 25–13 | | | 75–48 | |

== Final standing ==
| Rank | Team |
|---|---|
| 1st place, gold medalist(s) | United States |
| 2nd place, silver medalist(s) | Dominican Republic |
| 3rd place, bronze medalist(s) | Puerto Rico |
| 4 | Canada |
| 5 | Mexico |
| 6 | Honduras |

| Qualified for FIVB U18 World Championship |

2006 Girls' Youth NORCECA Championship

United States
4th title

== Individual awards ==
- Most valuable player
  - Tarrah Murrey (USA)
- Best scorer
  - Tarrah Murrey (USA)
- Best spiker
  - Tarrah Murrey (USA)
- Best blocker
  - Becky Pavan (CAN)
- Best server
  - Alexandra Hunt (USA)
- Best setter
  - Jenifer Nogueras (PUR)
- Best receiver
  - Kanani Herring (USA)
- Best libero
  - Sydney Yogi (USA)
- Best Defense
  - Maria Escoto (PUR)
