= 2010 Girls' Youth NORCECA Volleyball Championship =

Tournament details
- Host country: Guatemala City
- Dates: 27 April – 2 May 2010
- Teams: 10
- Venue: 1 (in 1 host city)

Final positions
- Champions: United States (6th title)

Tournament awards
- MVP: Samantha Bricio (MEX)

The 2010 Girls' Youth NORCECA Volleyball Championship was played from April 27 to May 2, 2010, in Guatemala City, Guatemala. Ten teams competed in this tournament. United States won the tournament for the sixth time defeating Mexico. Puerto Rico joined the United States and Mexico to compete at the 2011 Girls' U18 World Championship. Samantha Bricio of Mexico was named the tournament MVP.

== Competing nations ==
Group A	Group B	Group C
Mexico; Costa Rica; Trinidad and Tobago	Puerto Rico; Guatemala; El Salvador	United States; Dominican Republic; Canada; Jamaica

== Preliminary round ==
- All times are in Peru Standard Time (UTC−05:00)

=== Group A ===
Pos	Team	Pld	W	L	Pts	SW	SL	SR	SPW	SPL	SPR	
1	Mexico	2	2	0	4	6	0	MAX	150	64	2.344	Advances to semifinals
2	Costa Rica	2	1	1	3	3	5	0.600	139	161	0.863	Advances to quarterfinals
3	Trinidad and Tobago	2	0	2	2	2	6	0.333	120	184	0.652	

Date	Time		Score		Set 1	Set 2	Set 3	Set 4	Set 5	Total	Report
27 Apr	16:00	Mexico	3–0	Trinidad and Tobago	25–16	25–7	25–11			75–34	P2P3
28 Apr	14:00	Trinidad and Tobago	2–3	Costa Rica	12–25	25–22	13–25	25–22	11–15	86–109	P2P3
29 Apr	16:00	Costa Rica	0–3	Mexico	9–25	10–25	11–25			30–75	P2P3

=== Group B ===
Pos	Team	Pld	W	L	Pts	SW	SL	SR	SPW	SPL	SPR	
1	Puerto Rico	2	2	0	4	6	0	MAX	150	77	1.948	Advances to semifinals
2	Guatemala	2	1	1	3	3	3	1.000	121	133	0.910	Advances to quarterfinals
3	El Salvador	2	0	2	2	0	6	0.000	88	150	0.587	

Date	Time		Score		Set 1	Set 2	Set 3	Set 4	Set 5	Total	Report
27 Apr	14:00	Puerto Rico	3–0	El Salvador	25–8	25–11	25–12			75–31	P2P3
28 Apr	18:00	El Salvador	0–3	Guatemala	21–25	18–25	19–25			58–75	P2P3
29 Apr	18:00	Guatemala	0–3	Puerto Rico	19–25	16–25	11–25			46–75	P2P3

=== Group C ===
Pos	Team	Pld	W	L	Pts	SW	SL	SR	SPW	SPL	SPR	
1	United States	3	3	0	6	9	0	MAX	225	100	2.250	Advances to semifinals
2	Dominican Republic	3	2	1	5	6	4	1.500	216	164	1.317	Advances to quarterfinals
3	Canada	3	1	2	4	4	6	0.667	194	205	0.946	
3	Jamaica	3	0	3	3	0	9	0.000	59	225	0.262	

Date	Time		Score		Set 1	Set 2	Set 3	Set 4	Set 5	Total	Report
27 Apr	12:00	Jamaica	0–3	Canada	10–25	9–25	15–25			34–75	P2P3
27 Apr	19:00	Dominican Republic	0–3	United States	12–25	18–25	15–25			45–75	P2P3
28 Apr	16:00	United States	3–0	Jamaica	25–4	25–7	25–4			75–15	P2P3
28 Apr	20:00	Canada	1–3	Dominican Republic	25–21	19–25	16–25	19–25		79–96	P2P3
29 Apr	14:00	Dominican Republic	3–0	Jamaica	25–4	25–4	25–2			75–10	P2P3
29 Apr	20:00	United States	3–0	Canada	25–14	25–12	25–14			75–40	P2P3

== Final round ==
=== Championship bracket ===
Quarterfinals
B1	Puerto Rico	3
A2	Costa Rica	1
B2	Guatemala	0
C2	Dominican Republic	3

Semifinals
B1	Puerto Rico	0
C1	United States	3
C2	Dominican Republic	1
A1	Mexico	3

Finals
C1	United States	3
A1	Mexico	1
Third place
C2	Dominican Republic	0
B1	Puerto Rico	3

=== Quarterfinals ===
Date	Time		Score		Set 1	Set 2	Set 3	Set 4	Set 5	Total	Report
30-Apr.	15:00	Puerto Rico	3–1	Costa Rica	23–25	25–19	25–19	25–16		98–79	P2P3
30-Apr.	17:00	Guatemala	0–3	Dominican Republic	11–25	16–25	13–25			40–75	P2P3

=== Classification 7–10 ===
Date	Time		Score		Set 1	Set 2	Set 3	Set 4	Set 5	Total	Report
30-Apr.	9:00	Trinidad and Tobago	3–0	Jamaica	25–16	25–12	25–10			75–38	P2P3
30-Apr.	11:00	El Salvador	0–3	Canada	11–25	15–25	18–25			44–75	P2P3

=== Classification 7–8 ===
Date	Time		Score		Set 1	Set 2	Set 3	Set 4	Set 5	Total	Report
1-May	9:00	Jamaica	0–3	El Salvador	13–25	9–25	10–25			32–75	P2P3
1-May	11:00	Trinidad and Tobago	0–3	Canada	16–25	12–25	22–25			50–75	P2P3

=== Semifinals ===
Date	Time		Score		Set 1	Set 2	Set 3	Set 4	Set 5	Total	Report
1-May	15:00	Mexico	3–1	Dominican Republic	21–25	25–15	25–14	25–20		96–74	P2P3
1-May	17:00	United States	3–0	Puerto Rico	25–23	25–16	25–18			75–57	P2P3

=== Fifth place match ===
Date	Time		Score		Set 1	Set 2	Set 3	Set 4	Set 5	Total	Report
2-May	12:00	Costa Rica	3–0	Guatemala	25–18	25–16	25–11			75–45	P2P3

=== Bronze medal match ===
Date	Time		Score		Set 1	Set 2	Set 3	Set 4	Set 5	Total	Report
2-May	14:00	Dominican Republic	0–3	Puerto Rico	20–25	16–25	21–25			57–75	P2P3

=== Final ===
Date	Time		Score		Set 1	Set 2	Set 3	Set 4	Set 5	Total	Report
2-May	16:00	United States	3–1	Mexico	25–19	25–21	15–25	25–17		90–82	P2P3

== Final standing ==
Rank	Team
1st place, gold medalist(s)	United States
2nd place, silver medalist(s)	Mexico
3rd place, bronze medalist(s)	Puerto Rico
4	Dominican Republic
5	Costa Rica
6	Guatemala
7	Canada
8	Trinidad and Tobago
9	El Salvador
10	Jamaica

Qualified for FIVB U18 World Championship

2010 Girls' Youth Pan-American Cup champions

United States
6th title

== Individual awards ==
- Most valuable player
  - Samantha Bricio (MEX)
- Best scorer
  - Channon Thompson (TTO)
- Best setter
  - Madison Bugg (USA)
- Best Middle Blockers
  - Mallory McCage (USA)
- Best libero
  - Winifer Fernández (DOM)
- Best server
  - Winifer Fernández (DOM)
- Best receiver
  - Winifer Fernández (DOM)
