= Puerto Rico women's national under-19 volleyball team =

Puerto Rico
- Association: Puerto Rican Volleyball Federation
- Confederation: NORCECA

Uniforms
Home	Away	Third

Youth Olympic Games
- Appearances: None

FIVB U19 World Championship
- Appearances: 5 (First in 1991)
- Best result: 10th Place : (1991)

NORCECA U18 Championship
- Appearances: 10 (First in 1998)
- Best result: (gold) Gold : (2000)

The Puerto Rico women's national under-18 volleyball team represents Puerto Rico in international women's volleyball competitions and friendly matches under the age 18 and it is ruled by the Puerto Rican Volleyball Federation That Follow the North, Central America and Caribbean Volleyball Confederation NORCECA and also is a part of The Federation of International Volleyball FIVB.

== Results ==
=== Summer Youth Olympics ===
Champions Runners up Third place Fourth place

Youth Olympic Games
Year	Round	Position	Pld	W	L	SW	SL	Squad
(Singapore) 2010	Didn't Qualify							
(China) 2014	No Volleyball Event							
(Argentina) 2018	No Volleyball Event							
Total	0 Titles	0/1						

=== FIVB U18 World Championship ===
Champions Runners up Third place Fourth place

FIVB U18 World Championship
Year	Round	Position	Pld	W	L	SW	SL	Squad
(Brazil) 1989	Didn't Enter							
(Portugal) 1991		10th place						Squad
(Czechoslovakia) 1993	Didn't Qualify							
(France) 1995	Didn't Qualify							
(Thailand) 1997	Didn't Qualify							
(Portugal) 1999	Didn't Qualify							
(Croatia) 2001	Didn't Qualify							
(Poland) 2003	Didn't Qualify							
(Macau) 2005		13th place						Squad
(Mexico) 2007		15th place						Squad
(Thailand) 2009	Didn't Qualify							
(Turkey) 2011		15th place						Squad
(Thailand) 2013		14th place						Squad
(Peru) 2015	Didn't Qualify							
(Argentina) 2017	Didn't Qualify							
(Egypt) 2019		16th place						Squad
(Mexico) 2021		15th place						Squad
Total	0 Titles	7/15						

=== NORCECA Girls' U18 Championship ===
Champions Runners up Third place Fourth place

NORCECA Girls' U18 Championship
Year	Round	Position	Pld	W	L	SW	SL	Squad
(Puerto Rico) 1998	Final	Runners-Up						Squad
(Dominican Republic) 2000	Final	1st place						Squad
(United States) 2002	Semifinals	Third place						Squad
(Puerto Rico) 2004	Final	Runners-Up						Squad
(United States) 2006	Semifinals	Third place						Squad
(Puerto Rico) 2008	Semifinals	4th place						Squad
(Guatemala) 2010	Semifinals	Third place						Squad
(Mexico) 2012	Semifinals	4th place						Squad
(Costa Rica) 2014	Semifinals	4th place						Squad
(Puerto Rico) 2016	Semifinals	4th place						Squad
(Honduras) 2018	Didn't Enter							
Total	1 Title	10/11						

=== Pan-American U18 Cup ===
Champions Runners up Third place Fourth place

Pan-American U18 Cup
Year	Round	Position	Pld	W	L	SW	SL	Squad
(Mexico) 2011		5th place						Squad
(Guatemala) 2013	Final	Runners-Up						Squad
(Cuba) 2015	Semifinals	4th place						Squad
(Cuba) 2017		7th place						Squad
(Mexico) 2019	Final	2nd place						Squad
Total	0 Titles	5/5						

== Team ==
=== Current squad ===
The following is the Puerto Rican roster in the 2019 Girls' Youth Pan-American Volleyball Cup.

Head Coach: (Puerto Rico) Juan Rodriguez

No.	Name	Date of birth	Height	Weight	Spike	Block	2019 club
1	Jennifer Collazo Monte De Oca	18 February 2002	1.8 m (5 ft 11 in)	50 kg (110 lb)	274 cm (108 in)	254 cm (100 in)	(Puerto Rico) National Team
2	Mariana Trujillo	24 April 2002	1.88 m (6 ft 2 in)	77 kg (170 lb)	247 cm (97 in)	242 cm (95 in)	(Puerto Rico) National Team
3	Kiaraliz Perez	29 July 2002	1.83 m (6 ft 0 in)	67 kg (148 lb)	244 cm (96 in)	235 cm (93 in)	(Puerto Rico) National Team
4	Sofia Victoria	3 May 2002	1.8 m (5 ft 11 in)	69 kg (152 lb)	284 cm (112 in)	279 cm (110 in)	(Puerto Rico) National Team
5	Valeria Otero Morales	26 December 2002	1.7 m (5 ft 7 in)	59 kg (130 lb)	262 cm (103 in)	248 cm (98 in)	(Puerto Rico) National Team
7	Paola Matos Carrasquillo	24 December 2002	1.78 m (5 ft 10 in)	55 kg (121 lb)	270 cm (110 in)	250 cm (98 in)	(Puerto Rico) National Team
8	Alondra Maldonado	14 November 2002	1.9 m (6 ft 3 in)	72 kg (159 lb)	245 cm (96 in)	238 cm (94 in)	(Puerto Rico) National Team
9	Carolina Carmacho Castro	12 September 2002	1.68 m (5 ft 6 in)	48 kg (106 lb)	265 cm (104 in)	248 cm (98 in)	(Puerto Rico) National Team
11	Maria Caratrini Colon	25 June 2002	1.68 m (5 ft 6 in)	50 kg (110 lb)	260 cm (100 in)	241 cm (95 in)	(Puerto Rico) National Team
12	Marcelle Baez Carlo	14 February 2003	1.81 m (5 ft 11 in)	53 kg (117 lb)	273 cm (107 in)	253 cm (100 in)	(Puerto Rico) National Team
14	Cristal Paulino Rubel	26 April 2003	1.82 m (6 ft 0 in)	61 kg (134 lb)	274 cm (108 in)	256 cm (101 in)	(Puerto Rico) National Team
15	Clauda Borri Fernandez	11 April 2002	1.78 m (5 ft 10 in)	64 kg (141 lb)	270 cm (110 in)	252 cm (99 in)	(Puerto Rico) National Team
