= Mexico women's national under-19 volleyball team =

Mexico
- Association: Mexican Volleyball Federation
- Confederation: NORCECA

Uniforms
Home	Away	Third

Youth Olympic Games
- Appearances: None

FIVB U19 World Championship
- Appearances: 8 (First in 1993)
- Best result: 9th Place : (1993, 2009)

NORCECA U18 Championship
- Appearances: 8 (First in 2000)
- Best result: (silver) Silver : (2008, 2010)

The Mexico women's national under-18 volleyball team represents Mexico in international women's volleyball competitions and friendly matches under the age 18 and it is ruled by the Mexican Volleyball Federation That Follow the North, Central America and Caribbean Volleyball Confederation NORCECA and also is a part of The Federation of International Volleyball FIVB.

== Results ==
=== Summer Youth Olympics ===
Champions Runners up Third place Fourth place

Youth Olympic Games
Year	Round	Position	Pld	W	L	SW	SL	Squad
(Singapore) 2010	Didn't Qualify							
(China) 2014	No Volleyball Event							
(Argentina) 2018	No Volleyball Event							
Total	0 Titles	0/1						

=== FIVB U18 World Championship ===
Champions Runners up Third place Fourth place

FIVB U18 World Championship
Year	Round	Position	Pld	W	L	SW	SL	Squad
(Brazil) 1989	Didn't Enter							
(Portugal) 1991	Didn't Enter							
(Czechoslovakia) 1993		9th place						Squad
(France) 1995		11th place						Squad
(Thailand) 1997	Didn't Qualify							
(Portugal) 1999	Didn't Qualify							
(Croatia) 2001	Didn't Qualify							
(Poland) 2003	Didn't Qualify							
(Macau) 2005	Didn't Qualify							
(Mexico) 2007		13th place						Squad
(Thailand) 2009		9th place						Squad
(Turkey) 2011		12th place						Squad
(Thailand) 2013		18th place						Squad
(Peru) 2015		15th place						Squad
(Argentina) 2017		18th place						Squad
(Egypt) 2019		18th place						Squad
(Mexico) 2021		13th place						Squad
Total	0 Titles	9/17						

=== NORCECA Girls' U18 Championship ===
Champions Runners up Third place Fourth place

NORCECA Girls' U18 Championship
Year	Round	Position	Pld	W	L	SW	SL	Squad
(Puerto Rico) 1998	Didn't Enter							
(Dominican Republic) 2000		5th place						Squad
(United States) 2002	Didn't Enter							
(Puerto Rico) 2004	Semifinals	Third place						Squad
(United States) 2006		5th place						Squad
(Puerto Rico) 2008	Final	Runners-Up						Squad
(Guatemala) 2010	Final	Runners-Up						Squad
(Mexico) 2012	Semifinals	Third place						Squad
(Costa Rica) 2014	Semifinals	Third place						Squad
(Puerto Rico) 2016	Semifinals	Third place						Squad
(Honduras) 2018	Didn't Enter							
Total	0 Titles	8/11						

=== Pan-American U18 Cup ===
Champions Runners up Third place Fourth place

Pan-American U18 Cup
Year	Round	Position	Pld	W	L	SW	SL	Squad
(Mexico) 2011	Final	Runners-Up						Squad
(Guatemala) 2013	Didn't Enter							
(Cuba) 2015		6th place						Squad
(Cuba) 2017		5th place						Squad
(Mexico) 2019	Semifinals	3rd place						Squad
Total	0 Titles	4/5						

== Team ==
=== Current squad ===
The following is the Mexican roster in the 2019 Girls' Youth Pan-American Volleyball Cup.

Head Coach: (Mexico) Ricardo Naranjo Ponce

No.	Name	Date of birth	Height	Weight	Spike	Block	2019 club
2	Aime Pardo	16 October 2005	1.78 m (5 ft 10 in)	80 kg (180 lb)	270 cm (110 in)	260 cm (100 in)	(Mexico) Nayarit
3	Sofia Diaz	6 February 2002	1.78 m (5 ft 10 in)	58 kg (128 lb)	275 cm (108 in)	260 cm (100 in)	(Mexico) Jalisco
5	Anna Nunez	5 April 2004	1.67 m (5 ft 6 in)	58 kg (128 lb)	250 cm (98 in)	240 cm (94 in)	(Mexico) Baja California
6	Grecia Enriquez	8 April 2003	1.71 m (5 ft 7 in)	55 kg (121 lb)	260 cm (100 in)	255 cm (100 in)	(Mexico) Sonora
7	Gloria Enriques	25 April 2002	1.81 m (5 ft 11 in)	59 kg (130 lb)	290 cm (110 in)	270 cm (110 in)	(Mexico) Sonora
8	Marian Leyva	14 June 2002	1.78 m (5 ft 10 in)	66 kg (146 lb)	278 cm (109 in)	260 cm (100 in)	(Mexico) Chihuahua
9	Ana Vargas	26 April 2004	1.75 m (5 ft 9 in)	67 kg (148 lb)	270 cm (110 in)	265 cm (104 in)	(Mexico) Baja California
10	Maria De la Cerda	15 September 2002	1.79 m (5 ft 10 in)	76 kg (168 lb)	270 cm (110 in)	268 cm (106 in)	(Mexico) Jalisco
11	Izabella Cervantes	28 January 2003	1.76 m (5 ft 9 in)	68 kg (150 lb)	280 cm (110 in)	265 cm (104 in)	(Mexico) Baja California
12	Stephanie Salinas	6 May 2003	1.59 m (5 ft 3 in)	55 kg (121 lb)	230 cm (91 in)	230 cm (91 in)	(Mexico) Nuevo León
16	Melanie Quintero	12 September 2002	1.76 m (5 ft 9 in)	50 kg (110 lb)	249 cm (98 in)	242 cm (95 in)	(Mexico) Sinaloa
18	Angella Rios	30 September 2002	1.65 m (5 ft 5 in)	58 kg (128 lb)	260 cm (100 in)	255 cm (100 in)	(Mexico) Nuevo León
