= 2014 Girls' Youth NORCECA Volleyball Championship =

Volleyball competition in Costa Rica

2014 Girls' Youth NORCECA Youth Championship
Tournament details
- Host country: San José
- Dates: 22–30 June 2014
- Teams: 9
- Venue: 1 (in 1 host city)

Final positions
- Champions: Dominican Republic (1st title)
- Runners-up: United States
- Third place: Mexico

Tournament awards
- MVP: Natalia Martinez (DOM)

The 2014 Girls' Youth NORCECA Volleyball Championship played by nine countries from June 22–30, 2014 in San José, Costa Rica. The Dominican Republic won the tournament for the first time and qualified for the 2015 FIVB Girls' World Championship along with the United States and Mexico. Dominican Republic player Natalia Martínez won the Most Valuable Player award.

== Competing nations ==
| Group A | Group B | Group C |
|---|---|---|
| Trinidad and Tobago; Costa Rica; Guatemala | United States; Mexico; Honduras | Puerto Rico; Dominican Republic; Saint Lucia |

== Preliminary round ==
=== Group A ===
| Pos | Team | Pld | W | L | Pts | SW | SL | SR | SPW | SPL | SPR | Qualification |
|---|---|---|---|---|---|---|---|---|---|---|---|---|
| 1 | Costa Rica | 2 | 2 | 0 | 6 | 6 | 1 | 6.000 | 170 | 130 | 1.308 | Quarterfinals |
| 2 | Guatemala | 2 | 1 | 1 | 3 | 4 | 3 | 1.333 | 155 | 153 | 1.013 | Quarterfinals |
| 3 | Trinidad and Tobago | 2 | 0 | 2 | 0 | 0 | 6 | 0.000 | 108 | 150 | 0.720 | |

| Date | Time | | Score | | Set 1 | Set 2 | Set 3 | Set 4 | Set 5 | Total | Report |
|---|---|---|---|---|---|---|---|---|---|---|---|
| 24 Jun | 20:00 | Trinidad and Tobago | 0–3 | Costa Rica | 21–25 | 15–25 | 14–26 | | | 50–76 | P2 P3 |
| 25 Jun | 18:00 | Guatemala | 3–0 | Trinidad and Tobago | 25–19 | 25–19 | 25–20 | | | 75–58 | P2 P3 |
| 26 Jun | 20:00 | Costa Rica | 3-1 | Guatemala | 25-19 | 25-23 | 20–25 | 25-13 | | 95–25 | P2 P3 |

=== Group B ===
| Pos | Team | Pld | W | L | Pts | SW | SL | SR | SPW | SPL | SPR | Qualification |
|---|---|---|---|---|---|---|---|---|---|---|---|---|
| 1 | United States | 2 | 2 | 0 | 6 | 6 | 0 | MAX | 150 | 81 | 1.852 | Semifinals |
| 2 | Mexico | 2 | 1 | 1 | 3 | 3 | 3 | 1.000 | 131 | 99 | 1.323 | Quarterfinals |
| 3 | Honduras | 2 | 0 | 2 | 0 | 0 | 6 | 0.000 | 49 | 150 | 0.327 | |

| Date | Time | | Score | | Set 1 | Set 2 | Set 3 | Set 4 | Set 5 | Total | Report |
|---|---|---|---|---|---|---|---|---|---|---|---|
| 24 Jun | 18:00 | Honduras | 0–3 | United States | 8–25 | 9–25 | 8–25 | | | 25–75 | P2 P3 |
| 25 Jun | 20:00 | Mexico | 3–0 | Honduras | 25–9 | 25–8 | 25–7 | | | 75–24 | P2 P3 |
| 26 Jun | 16:00 | United States | 3-0 | Mexico | 25-20 | 25-17 | 25–19 | | | 75–19 | P2 P3 |

=== Group C ===
| Pos | Team | Pld | W | L | Pts | SW | SL | SR | SPW | SPL | SPR | Qualification |
|---|---|---|---|---|---|---|---|---|---|---|---|---|
| 1 | Dominican Republic | 2 | 2 | 0 | 6 | 6 | 0 | MAX | 150 | 68 | 2.206 | Semifinals |
| 2 | Puerto Rico | 2 | 1 | 1 | 3 | 3 | 3 | 1.000 | 133 | 94 | 1.415 | Quarterfinals |
| 3 | Saint Lucia | 2 | 0 | 2 | 0 | 0 | 6 | 0.000 | 29 | 150 | 0.193 | |

| Date | Time | | Score | | Set 1 | Set 2 | Set 3 | Set 4 | Set 5 | Total | Report |
|---|---|---|---|---|---|---|---|---|---|---|---|
| 24 Jun | 16:00 | Puerto Rico | 3-0 | Saint Lucia | 25-6 | 25-8 | 25-5 | | | 75–0 | P2 P3 |
| 25 Jun | 16:00 | Saint Lucia | 0-3 | Dominican Republic | 4-25 | 2-25 | 4-25 | | | 10–0 | P2 P3 |
| 26 Jun | 18:00 | Dominican Republic | 3-0 | Puerto Rico | 25-21 | 25-19 | 25–18 | | | 75–18 | P2 P3 |

== Final round ==
=== Championship bracket ===
Quarterfinals
C2 | Puerto Rico | 3
A2 | Guatemala | 0
A1 | Costa Rica | 0
B2 | Mexico | 3

Semifinals
B1 | United States | 3
C2 | Puerto Rico | 0
C1 | Dominican Republic | 3
B2 | Mexico | 0
5th & 6th
A2 | Guatemala | 0
A1 | Costa Rica | 3

Gold Medal
B1 | United States | 1
C1 | Dominican Republic | 3
Bronze Medal
B2 | Mexico | 3
C2 | Puerto Rico | 1

=== 7th-9th places bracket ===
| 7th-9th place | | | 7th & 8th |
| | | | A3 | Trinidad and Tobago | 3 |
| B3 | Honduras | 3 | B3 | Honduras | 0 |
| C3 | Saint Lucia | 0 |

=== Classification 7/9 ===
| Date | Time | | Score | | Set 1 | Set 2 | Set 3 | Set 4 | Set 5 | Total | Report |
|---|---|---|---|---|---|---|---|---|---|---|---|
| 27 Jun | 16:00 | Honduras | 3–0 | Saint Lucia | 25–13 | 25–13 | 25–22 | | | 75–48 | P2 P3 |

=== Quarterfinals ===
| Date | Time | | Score | | Set 1 | Set 2 | Set 3 | Set 4 | Set 5 | Total | Report |
|---|---|---|---|---|---|---|---|---|---|---|---|
| 27 Jun | 18:00 | Puerto Rico | 3–0 | Guatemala | 25–13 | 25-19 | 25–19 | | | 75–32 | P2 P3 |
| 27 Jun | 20:00 | Costa Rica | 0–3 | Mexico | 11-25 | 15-25 | 13-25 | | | 39–0 | P2 P3 |

=== Semifinals ===
| Date | Time | | Score | | Set 1 | Set 2 | Set 3 | Set 4 | Set 5 | Total | Report |
|---|---|---|---|---|---|---|---|---|---|---|---|
| 28 Jun | 18:00 | United States | 3–0 | Puerto Rico | 25-17 | 25-21 | 25–17 | | | 75–17 | P2 P3 |
| 28 Jun | 20:00 | Dominican Republic | 3-0 | Mexico | 25-19 | 25-21 | 25–14 | | | 75–14 | P2 P3 |

=== Seventh place match ===
| Date | Time | | Score | | Set 1 | Set 2 | Set 3 | Set 4 | Set 5 | Total | Report |
|---|---|---|---|---|---|---|---|---|---|---|---|
| 28 Jun | 16:00 | Trinidad and Tobago | 3-0 | Honduras | 25–23 | 26-24 | 25–15 | | | 76–38 | P2 P3 |

=== Fifth place match ===
| Date | Time | | Score | | Set 1 | Set 2 | Set 3 | Set 4 | Set 5 | Total | Report |
|---|---|---|---|---|---|---|---|---|---|---|---|
| 29 Jun | 16:00 | Guatemala | 0–3 | Costa Rica | 18–25 | 14-25 | 18-25 | | | 50–25 | P2 P3 |

=== Bronze medal match ===
| Date | Time | | Score | | Set 1 | Set 2 | Set 3 | Set 4 | Set 5 | Total | Report |
|---|---|---|---|---|---|---|---|---|---|---|---|
| 29 Jun | 18:00 | Puerto Rico | 1–3 | Mexico | 24-26 | 20–25 | 25-19 | 19-25 | | 88–25 | P2 P3 |

=== Final ===
| Date | Time | | Score | | Set 1 | Set 2 | Set 3 | Set 4 | Set 5 | Total | Report |
|---|---|---|---|---|---|---|---|---|---|---|---|
| 29 Jun | 20:00 | United States | 1–3 | Dominican Republic | 14–25 | 21–25 | 25–20 | 20–25 | | 80–95 | P2 P3 |

== Final standing ==
| Qualifies to the 2015 FIVB Volleyball Girls' U18 World Championship |

| Rank | Team |
|---|---|
| 1st place, gold medalist(s) | Dominican Republic |
| 2nd place, silver medalist(s) | United States |
| 3rd place, bronze medalist(s) | Mexico |
| 4 | Puerto Rico |
| 5 | Costa Rica |
| 6 | Guatemala |
| 7 | Trinidad and Tobago |
| 8 | Honduras |
| 9 | Saint Lucia |

2014 Girls' Youth NORCECA Youth Championship

Dominican Republic
1st title

== Individual awards ==
- Most valuable player
  - Natalia Martinez (DOM)
- Best setter
  - Lauren Speckman (USA)
- Best Opposite
  - Massiel Matos (DOM)
- Best Outside Hitters
  - Vielka Peralta (DOM)
  - Alejandra Negron (PUR)
- Best Middle Blockers
  - Mariana Rodríguez (CRC)
  - Joseline Coronel (PUR)
- Best libero
  - Valeria Monge (CRC)
