= 2018 Girls' Youth NORCECA Volleyball Championship =

Tournament details
- Host country: Honduras
- Dates: 25 August – 2 September
- Teams: 8
- Venue: 1 (in 1 host city)

Final positions
- Champions: United States (8th title)

Tournament awards
- MVP: Jessica Mzurik (USA)

The 2018 Girls' Youth NORCECA Volleyball Championship was the eleventh edition of the bi-annual volleyball tournament. It was held in Tegucigalpa National Gymnasium, Tegucigalpa, Honduras from 25 August to 2 September among eight countries. The United States won the tournament and qualified for the 2019 FIVB Girls' World Championship along with Canada. United States player Jessica Mzurik won the Most Valuable Player award.

== Qualification ==
A total of 9 teams qualify for the 2018 Girls' Youth NORCECA Volleyball Championship. In addition to Honduras who qualified automatically as hosts, the other 8 teams qualify based on top 5 teams from the NORCECA U 18 Continental Ranking and the 3 Zonal Champions from the AFECAVOL, ECVA and CAZOVA, U-18 Zonal Championships. Mexico withdrew from the tournament and the event continued with only 8 teams.

== Pool composition ==
Group A	Group B
Cuba	United States
Dominican Republic	Honduras
Canada	Nicaragua
Costa Rica	Barbados

== Pool standing procedure ==
1. Number of matches won
2. Match points
3. Points ratio
4. Sets ratio
5. Result of the last match between the tied teams

Match won 3–0: 5 match points for the winner, 0 match points for the loser
Match won 3–1: 4 match points for the winner, 1 match point for the loser
Match won 3–2: 3 match points for the winner, 2 match points for the loser

== Preliminary round ==
- All times are in Central Standard Time

=== Group A ===
Pos	Team	Pld	W	L	Pts	SPW	SPL	SPR	SW	SL	SR	Qualification
1	Cuba	3	3	0	15	225	154	1.461	9	0	MAX	Semifinals
2	Dominican Republic	3	2	1	10	207	174	1.190	6	3	2.000	Quarterfinals
3	Canada	3	1	2	5	193	194	0.995	3	6	0.500	Quarterfinals
4	Costa Rica	3	0	3	0	122	225	0.542	0	9	0.000	5th–8th classification

Date	Time		Score		Set 1	Set 2	Set 3	Set 4	Set 5	Total	Report
27 Aug	16:00	Cuba	3–0	Canada	25–19	25–20	25–20			75–59	P2 P3
27 Aug	18:00	Dominican Republic	3–0	Costa Rica	25–12	25–15	25–13			75–40	P2 P3
28 Aug	16:00	Dominican Republic	3–0	Canada	25–19	25–21	25–19			75–59	P2 P3
28 Aug	18:00	Cuba	3–0	Costa Rica	25–11	25–15	25–12			75–38	P2 P3
29 Aug	14:00	Costa Rica	0–3	Canada	17–25	14–25	13–25			44–75	P2 P3
29 Aug	18:00	Cuba	3–0	Dominican Republic	25–19	25–19	25–19			75–57	P2 P3

=== Group B ===
Pos	Team	Pld	W	L	Pts	SPW	SPL	SPR	SW	SL	SR	Qualification
1	United States	3	3	0	15	225	97	2.320	9	0	MAX	Semifinals
2	Honduras	3	2	1	10	185	176	1.051	6	3	2.000	Quarterfinals
3	Nicaragua	3	1	2	5	152	202	0.752	3	6	0.500	Quarterfinals
4	Barbados	3	0	3	0	138	225	0.613	0	9	0.000	5th–8th classification

Date	Time		Score		Set 1	Set 2	Set 3	Set 4	Set 5	Total	Report
27 Aug	14:00	United States	3–0	Nicaragua	25–6	25–11	25–12			75–29	P2 P3
27 Aug	20:00	Honduras	3–0	Barbados	25–12	25–19	25–22			75–53	P2 P3
28 Aug	14:00	United States	3–0	Barbados	25–10	25–7	25–16			75–33	P2 P3
28 Aug	20:00	Honduras	3–0	Nicaragua	25–18	25–18	25–12			75–48	P2 P3
29 Aug	16:00	Barbados	0–3	Nicaragua	15–25	18–25	19–25			52–75	P2 P3
29 Aug	20:00	United States	3–0	Honduras	25–12	25–10	25–13			75–35	P2 P3

== Final round ==
=== Bracket ===
Quarterfinals
Dominican Republic	3
Nicaragua	0
Honduras	0
Canada	3

Semifinals
United States	3
Dominican Republic	0
Cuba	2
Canada	3

Finals
United States	3
Canada	0
Third place
Dominican Republic	1
Cuba	3

Consolation semifinals
Costa Rica	3
Nicaragua	0
Barbados	0
Honduras	3

7th place
Nicaragua	3
Barbados	0
5th place
Costa Rica	3
Honduras	0

=== Quarterfinals ===
Date	Time		Score		Set 1	Set 2	Set 3	Set 4	Set 5	Total	Report
30 Aug	18:00	Dominican Republic	3–0	Nicaragua	25–6	25–11	25–16			75–33	P2 P3
30 Aug	20:00	Honduras	0–3	Canada	15–25	16–25	16–25			47–75	P2 P3

=== 5th–8th Classification ===
Date	Time		Score		Set 1	Set 2	Set 3	Set 4	Set 5	Total	Report
31 Aug	14:00	Costa Rica	3–0	Nicaragua	25–19	25–17	25–12			75–48	P2 P3
31 Aug	16:00	Barbados	0–3	Honduras	14–25	16–25	16–25			46–75	P2 P3

=== Semifinals ===
Date	Time		Score		Set 1	Set 2	Set 3	Set 4	Set 5	Total	Report
31 Aug	18:00	Cuba	2–3	Canada	25–18	19–25	25–20	23–25	14–16	106–104	P2 P3
31 Aug	20:00	United States	3–0	Dominican Republic	25–12	25–17	25–17			75–46	P2 P3

=== 7th place ===
Date	Time		Score		Set 1	Set 2	Set 3	Set 4	Set 5	Total	Report
1 Sep	14:00	Nicaragua	3–0	Barbados	25–18	25–21	25–14			75–53	P2 P3

=== 5th place ===
Date	Time		Score		Set 1	Set 2	Set 3	Set 4	Set 5	Total	Report
1 Sep	16:00	Costa Rica	3–0	Honduras	25–20	25–17	25–16			75–53	

=== 3rd place ===
Date	Time		Score		Set 1	Set 2	Set 3	Set 4	Set 5	Total	Report
1 Sep	18:00	Cuba	3–1	Dominican Republic	19–25	25–20	28–26	25–16		97–87	P2 P3

=== Final ===
Date	Time		Score		Set 1	Set 2	Set 3	Set 4	Set 5	Total	Report
1 Sep	20:00	Canada	0–3	United States	13–25	12–25	23–25			48–75	P2 P3

== Finals standing ==
Qualified to 2019 FIVB Girls' World Championship.

Rank	Team
1st place, gold medalist(s)	United States
2nd place, silver medalist(s)	Canada
3rd place, bronze medalist(s)	Cuba
4	Dominican Republic
5	Costa Rica
6	Honduras
7	Nicaragua
8	Barbados

== Individual awards ==
- Most valuable player
  - Jessica Mzurik (USA)
- Best setter
  - Kennedi Orr (USA)
- Best Opposite
  - Emily Londot (USA)
- Best Outside Hitters
  - Jessica Mzurik (USA)
  - Alison Jacobs (USA)
- Best Middle Blockers
  - Geraldine González (DOM)
  - Esthefany Rabit (DOM)
- Best libero
  - Katerina Georgiadis (CAN)
- Best digger
  - Hattie Monson (USA)
- Best receiver
  - Hattie Monson (USA)
- Best server
  - Thainalien Castillo (CUB)
- Best scorer
  - Thainalien Castillo (CUB)
