= Dominican Republic women's national under-19 volleyball team =

Dominican Republic
- Association: Dominican Volleyball Federation
- Confederation: NORCECA

Uniforms
Home	Away

FIVB U19 World Championship
- Appearances: 7 (First in 1997)
- Best result: (silver) Silver : (2017)

NORCECA Girls U18 Championship
- Appearances: 10 (First in 1998)
- Best result: (gold) Gold : (2014, 2016)
- www.fedovoli.org (in Spanish)

The Dominic Republic women's national under-18 volleyball team represents the Dominican Republic in international women's volleyball competitions and friendly matches under the age 18 and it is ruled by the Dominican Volleyball Federation That Follow the North, Central America and Caribbean Volleyball Confederation NORCECA and also is a part of The Federation of International Volleyball FIVB.

== Results ==
=== FIVB U18 World Championship ===
Champions Runners up Third place Fourth place

FIVB U18 World Championship
Year	Round	Position	Pld	W	L	SW	SL	Squad
(Brazil) 1989	Didn't Qualify							
(Portugal) 1991	Didn't Qualify							
(Czechoslovakia) 1993	Didn't Qualify							
(France) 1995	Didn't Qualify							
(Thailand) 1997		13th place						Squad
(Portugal) 1999	Didn't Qualify							
(Croatia) 2001		8th place						Squad
(Poland) 2003	Didn't Qualify							
(Macau) 2005	Didn't Qualify							
(Mexico) 2007		8th place						Squad
(Thailand) 2009		11th place						Squad
(Turkey) 2011	Didn't Qualify							
(Thailand) 2013		8th place						Squad
(Peru) 2015		17th place						Squad
(Argentina) 2017	Final	2nd place						Squad
(Egypt) 2019	Didn't Qualify							
(Mexico) 2021		10th place						Squad
Total	0 Titles	9/17						—

=== NORCECA Girls U18 Championship ===
Champions Runners up Third place Fourth place

NORCECA Girls U18 Championship
Year	Round	Position	Pld	W	L	SW	SL	Squad
(Puerto Rico) 1998		4th place						Squad
(Dominican Republic) 2000	Semifinal	Third place						Squad
(United States) 2002	Final	2nd place						Squad
(Puerto Rico) 2004	Didn't Enter							
(United States) 2006	Final	2nd place						Squad
(Puerto Rico) 2008	Semifinal	Third place						Squad
(Guatemala) 2010	Semifinal	4th place						Squad
(Mexico) 2012	Final	2nd place						Squad
(Costa Rica) 2014	Final	1st place						Squad
(Puerto Rico) 2016	Final	1st place						Squad
(Honduras) 2018	Semifinal	4th place						Squad
Total	2 Titles	10/11						—

=== Pan-American U18 Cup ===
Champions Runners up Third place Fourth place

Pan-American U18 Cup
Year	Round	Position	Pld	W	L	SW	SL	Squad
(Mexico) 2011		Third place						Squad
(Guatemala) 2013		Third place						Squad
(Cuba) 2015	Final	2nd place						Squad
(Cuba) 2017	Semifinal	Third place						Squad
(Mexico) 2019	Quarterfinal	6th place						Squad
Total	0 Titles	5/5						

== Team ==
=== Current squad ===
The following is the Dominican roster in the 2019 Girls' Youth Pan-American Volleyball Cup.

Head Coach: (Brazil) Alexandre Ceccato

No.	Name	Date of birth	Height	Weight	Spike	Block	2019 club
1	Ailyn Gomez	5 April 2005	1.78 m (5 ft 10 in)	58 kg (128 lb)	295 cm (116 in)	283 cm (111 in)	(Dominican Republic) Calero
2	Laura Baez	14 April 2003	1.63 m (5 ft 4 in)	52 kg (115 lb)	265 cm (104 in)	261 cm (103 in)	(Dominican Republic) Mirador
4	Yanelys Mendoza	20 February 2003	1.8 m (5 ft 11 in)	65 kg (143 lb)	280 cm (110 in)	275 cm (108 in)	(Dominican Republic) La Hora de Dios
6	Michell Rosario	28 August 2002	1.62 m (5 ft 4 in)	53 kg (117 lb)	262 cm (103 in)	259 cm (102 in)	(Dominican Republic) Deportivo Nacional
7	Joeliza Mota	1 February 2003	1.7 m (5 ft 7 in)	66 kg (146 lb)	280 cm (110 in)	271 cm (107 in)	(Dominican Republic) Los Trinitarios
12	Cherlin Basilio	3 November 2003	1.91 m (6 ft 3 in)	75 kg (165 lb)	290 cm (110 in)	284 cm (112 in)	(Dominican Republic) La Romana
14	Esthefany Rabit	18 January 2002	1.86 m (6 ft 1 in)	82 kg (181 lb)	290 cm (110 in)	280 cm (110 in)	(Dominican Republic) San Pedro
15	Sarah Cruz	11 December 2002	1.76 m (5 ft 9 in)	55 kg (121 lb)	288 cm (113 in)	271 cm (107 in)	(Dominican Republic) Mirador
16	Jarolin Lugo	6 June 2002	1.89 m (6 ft 2 in)	82 kg (181 lb)	287 cm (113 in)	278 cm (109 in)	(Dominican Republic) Mirador
17	Romina Medina	29 June 2002	1.81 m (5 ft 11 in)	74 kg (163 lb)	286 cm (113 in)	280 cm (110 in)	(Dominican Republic) La Vega
19	Flormarie Colon	21 October 2002	1.81 m (5 ft 11 in)	80 kg (180 lb)	284 cm (112 in)	280 cm (110 in)	(Dominican Republic) Mirador
20	Geraldine González	18 April 2002	1.96 m (6 ft 5 in)	77 kg (170 lb)	295 cm (116 in)	290 cm (110 in)	(Dominican Republic) Mirador
