= Brazil women's national under-19 volleyball team =

Women's national volleyball team representing Brazil

Brazil
- Association: CBV
- Confederation: CSV

Uniforms
Home	Away

Youth Olympic Games
- Appearances: None

FIVB U19 World Championship
- Appearances: 15 (First in 1989)
- Best result: (gold) Gold : (1997, 2005, 2009)

The Brazil women's national under-18 volleyball team represents Brazil in international women's volleyball competitions and friendly matches under the age 18 and it is ruled by the Brazilian Volleyball Federation that is a member of South American volleyball body Confederación Sudamericana de Voleibol (CSV) and the international volleyball body government the Fédération Internationale de Volleyball (FIVB).

== Results ==
=== U19 World Championship ===
Champions Runners up Third place Fourth place

World Championship record
Year	Round	Position	GP	MW	ML	SW	SL	Squad
(Brazil) 1989	Final	Runners up	7	6	1	20	4	Squad
(Portugal) 1991	Final	Runners up						Squad
(Czechoslovakia) 1993		5th place						Squad
(France) 1995	Semifinals	4th place						Squad
(Thailand) 1997	Final	Champions	7	7	0	21	2	Squad
(Portugal) 1999	Final	Runners up	7	6	1	18	6	Squad
(Croatia) 2001	Final	Runners up	7	6	1	19	9	Squad
(Poland) 2003	Semifinals	3rd place	7	6	1	20	7	Squad
(Macau) 2005	Final	Champions	7	7	0	21	1	Squad
(Mexico) 2007	5th–8th semifinals	5th place	8	5	3	18	14	Squad
(Thailand) 2009	Final	Champions	8	8	0	24	4	Squad
(Turkey) 2011	5th–8th semifinals	6th place	8	5	3	19	14	Squad
(Thailand) 2013	Semifinals	3rd place	8	6	2	20	10	Squad
(Peru) 2015	Round of 16	11th Place	8	4	4	14	15	Squad
(Argentina) 2017	Round of 16	10th Place	8	3	5	15	16	Squad
(Egypt) 2019	Semifinals	3rd place	8	6	2	18	9	Squad
(Mexico) 2021	5th–8th semifinals	5th place	8	6	2	21	10	Squad
(Croatia) (Hungary) 2023	5th–8th semifinals	7th place	9	5	4	21	14	Squad
(Croatia) (Serbia) 2025	5th–8th semifinals	8th place	9	6	3	20	12	Squad
Total	3 Titles	16/16	—	—	—	—	—	—

=== U17 South America Championship ===
Champions Runners up Third place Fourth place

South America Championship record
Year	Round	Position	GP	MW	ML	SW	SL	Squad
(Argentina) 1978	Round robin	Runners up						
(Brazil) 1980	Round robin	Runners up						
(Paraguay) 1982	Round robin	Champions						
(Chile) 1984	Round robin	Champions						
(Peru) 1986	Round robin	Champions						
(Argentina) 1988	Round robin	Champions						
(Bolivia) 1990	Round robin	Champions						
(Venezuela) 1992	Round robin	Champions						
(Peru) 1994	Round robin	Champions						
(Uruguay) 1996	Round robin	Runners up						
(Bolivia) 1998	Round robin	Champions						
(Venezuela) 2000	Round robin	Champions						
(Venezuela) 2002	Round robin	Champions	5	5	0	15	2	—
(Ecuador) 2004	Final	Champions	5	5	0	15	1	—
(Peru) 2006	Final	Champions	5	5	0	15	1	—
(Peru) 2008	Final	Champions	5	5	0	15	1	—
(Peru) 2010	Final	Champions	5	5	0	15	2	—
(Peru) 2012	Final	Runners up	5	4	1	14	3	—
(Peru) 2014	Round robin	Champions	5	5	0	15	2	—
(Peru) 2016	Final	Champions	5	5	0	15	1	—
(Colombia) 2018	Semifinals	3rd place	5	4	1	12	5	—
Total	16 Titles	21/21	—	—	—	—	—	—

== Team ==
=== Current squad ===
The following is the Brazilian roster in the 2015 FIVB Volleyball Girls' U18 World Championship.

Head Coach: Luizomar de Moura

No.	Name	Date of birth	Height	Weight	Spike	Block	2015 club
2	Diana Duarte	22 February 1999	1.94 m (6 ft 4 in)	69 kg (152 lb)	297 cm (117 in)	287 cm (113 in)	(Brazil) Barueri
3	Jackeline Moreno	30 December 1999	1.74 m (5 ft 9 in)	67 kg (148 lb)	286 cm (113 in)	271 cm (107 in)	(Brazil) Barueri
5	Cassia Rauber	2 May 1998	1.83 m (6 ft 0 in)	62 kg (137 lb)	285 cm (112 in)	272 cm (107 in)	(Brazil) Saudade
8	Amanda Sehn (C)	16 July 1998	1.80 m (5 ft 11 in)	64 kg (141 lb)	280 cm (110 in)	270 cm (110 in)	(Brazil) Estrela
9	Lorrayna Da Silva	19 June 1999	1.85 m (6 ft 1 in)	62 kg (137 lb)	306 cm (120 in)	286 cm (113 in)	(Brazil) Taubaté Vôlei
10	Beatriz Carvalho	18 December 1998	1.80 m (5 ft 11 in)	67 kg (148 lb)	292 cm (115 in)	276 cm (109 in)	(Brazil) Regina Mundi
11	Eduarda Cavatão	28 September 1998	1.92 m (6 ft 4 in)	90 kg (200 lb)	298 cm (117 in)	287 cm (113 in)	(Brazil) Sesi-SP
12	Karina Souza	30 November 1998	1.82 m (6 ft 0 in)	65 kg (143 lb)	294 cm (116 in)	276 cm (109 in)	(Brazil) Pinheiros
13	Ana Beatriz Franklin	19 January 1998	1.82 m (6 ft 0 in)	67 kg (148 lb)	286 cm (113 in)	272 cm (107 in)	(Brazil) Pinheiros
14	Giovana Viezel	21 July 1999	1.90 m (6 ft 3 in)	76 kg (168 lb)	309 cm (122 in)	290 cm (110 in)	(Brazil) São José
17	Gabriella Da Silva	10 March 1999	1.63 m (5 ft 4 in)	60 kg (130 lb)	296 cm (117 in)	254 cm (100 in)	(Brazil) Fluminense
20	Nyeme Costa	11 October 1998	1.75 m (5 ft 9 in)	79 kg (174 lb)	297 cm (117 in)	280 cm (110 in)	(Brazil) Bradesco

== Former squads ==
=== U18 World Championship ===
- 2005 – Gold medal
  Camila Monteiro, Erica Adachi, Martina Roese, Nicole Silva, Betina Schmidt (c), Silvana Papini, Priscila Daroit, Natalia Pereira, Amanda Francisco, Renata Maggioni, Maria de Lourdes Silva and Tandara Caixeta
- 2007 – 5th place
  Ivna Marra, Patricia Stasiak, Rafaella Ponte, Leticia Raymundi (c), Ana Beatriz Correa, Ohana Moraes, Rosane Maggioni, Roberta Ratzke, Aline Lebioda, Rupia Furtado, Diana Silva and Glauciele Silva
- 2009 – Gold medal
  Rosane Maggioni (c), Sthefanie Paulino, Francynne Jacintho, Carolina Freitas, Eduarda Kraisch, Isabela Paquiardi, Ana Beatriz Correa, Samara Almeida, Priscila Heldes, Gabriella Souza, Sâmera Alcides and Carla Santos
- 2011 – 6th place
  Isabella Batista, Naiane Rios, Natália Silva, Carla Reginatto, Gabriela Guimarães, Rosamaria Montibeller, Valquiria Dullius, Paula Mohr, Juliana Filipelli, Raquel Oliveira (c), Stephanie Correa and Nayara Araújo
- 2013 – Bronze medal
  Drussyla Costa (c), Lana Conceição, Amanda Brock, Mariana Dias, Laiza Ferreira, Gabriela Candido, Gabriela Silva, Karoline Tormena, Lorenne Teixeira, Thais Oliveira, Lais Vasques and Marina Sanches
- 2015 – 11th place
  Diana Alecrim, Jackeline Santos, Cassia Rauber, Amanda Sehn (c), Lorrayna da Silva, Beatriz Carvalho, Eduarda Cavatão, Karina Souza, Ana Beatriz Franklin, Lorena Viezel, Gabriella Silva and Nyeme Costa
- 2017 – 10th place
  Julia Bergmann, Larissa Besen, Maria Clara Cavalcante, Rosely Nogueira, Daniela Seibt, Beatriz Santana, Lanna Machado, Sabrina Groth, Daniela Cechetto, Kenya Malachias (c), Mariana Brambilla and Tainara Santos
- 2019 – Bronze medal
  Istefani Silva, Marcelle da Silva, Ana Cecilia Lopes, Stephany Morete (c), Ana Cristina de Souza, Livia Lima, Julia Kudiess, Maria Clara Carvalhaes, Carolina Santos, Katia Silva, Ana Luiza Rüdiger and Letícia Moura

== See also ==
- Brazil men's national under-19 volleyball team
- Brazil women's national volleyball team
- Brazil women's national under-23 volleyball team
- Brazil women's national under-20 volleyball team
