= 2017 FIVB Volleyball Girls' U18 World Championship squads =

This article shows the rosters of all participating teams at the 2017 FIVB Volleyball Girls' U18 World Championship in Argentina.

== Pool A ==
=== Argentina ===
The following is the Argentinian roster in the 2017 FIVB Girls' U18 World Championship.

Head coach: Estanislao Vachino

No.	Name	Date of birth	Height	Weight	Spike	Block	2017 club
1	Pilar Cina	1 November 2000	1.76 m (5 ft 9 in)	58 kg (128 lb)	277 cm (109 in)	266 cm (105 in)	Banco Provincial
2	Victoria Mayer	19 June 2001	1.80 m (5 ft 11 in)	59 kg (130 lb)	285 cm (112 in)	265 cm (104 in)	Regatas - Santa Fe
4	Rocio Navarro	23 December 2000	1.84 m (6 ft 0 in)	67 kg (148 lb)	285 cm (112 in)	270 cm (110 in)	Argentino - Marcos Juarez
5	Candela Sol Salinas	23 May 2000	1.83 m (6 ft 0 in)	64 kg (141 lb)	278 cm (109 in)	265 cm (104 in)	Boca Juniors
7	Angeles Ligorria	24 January 2000	1.8 m (5 ft 11 in)	68 kg (150 lb)	290 cm (110 in)	270 cm (110 in)	Atenas - Cordoba
8	Guadalupe Martin	23 March 2002	1.81 m (5 ft 11 in)	72 kg (159 lb)	288 cm (113 in)	273 cm (107 in)	Universidad - San Juan
10	Sofia Meinardi	22 November 2001	1.75 m (5 ft 9 in)	70 kg (150 lb)	287 cm (113 in)	270 cm (110 in)	Central San Carlos
11	Bianca Farriol	18 December 2001	1.80 m (5 ft 11 in)	68 kg (150 lb)	290 cm (110 in)	270 cm (110 in)	Universidad La Matanza
14	Melisa Gabriela Corzo	5 January 2000	1.80 m (5 ft 11 in)	64 kg (141 lb)	283 cm (111 in)	274 cm (108 in)	9 DE JULIO - FREYRE
15	Zoe Gomez	19 September 2000	1.60 m (5 ft 3 in)	52 kg (115 lb)	290 cm (110 in)	270 cm (110 in)	Circulo Policial - Mza
17	Dominique Corsaro	8 June 2001	1.84 m (6 ft 0 in)	80 kg (180 lb)	290 cm (110 in)	273 cm (107 in)	Boca Juniors
19	Yuliana Pacheco	21 July 2001	1.96 m (6 ft 5 in)	72 kg (159 lb)	290 cm (110 in)	270 cm (110 in)	Parque Velez Sarsfield - Cba

=== Germany ===
The following is the German roster in the 2017 FIVB Girls' U18 World Championship.

Head coach: Jens Tietböhl

No.	Name	Date of birth	Height	Weight	Spike	Block	2017 club
1	Patricia Nestler	17 May 2001	1.69 m (5 ft 7 in)	56 kg (123 lb)	280 cm (110 in)	280 cm (110 in)	Dresdner Sc
2	Lea Ambrosius	22 May 2000	1.89 m (6 ft 2 in)	79 kg (174 lb)	305 cm (120 in)	298 cm (117 in)	Schwerner SC
3	Josepha Bock	23 January 2000	1.87 m (6 ft 2 in)	77 kg (170 lb)	300 cm (120 in)	289 cm (114 in)	VCO Berlin/ VC Bitterfeld-Wolf
4	Linda Bock	27 May 2000	1.72 m (5 ft 8 in)	60 kg (130 lb)	278 cm (109 in)	270 cm (110 in)	RC-Borken-Hoxfeld
5	Emma Cyris	9 April 2001	1.87 m (6 ft 2 in)	70 kg (150 lb)	301 cm (119 in)	292 cm (115 in)	VC Olympia Berlin
6	Athina Dimitriadis	23 June 2000	1.95 m (6 ft 5 in)	81 kg (179 lb)	301 cm (119 in)	291 cm (115 in)	VCO Berlin
7	Romy-Aylin Jatzko	26 January 2000	1.87 m (6 ft 2 in)	73 kg (161 lb)	303 cm (119 in)	292 cm (115 in)	VCO Berlin
9	Alexa Kaminski	17 February 2000	1.88 m (6 ft 2 in)	66 kg (146 lb)	302 cm (119 in)	292 cm (115 in)	VCO Schwerin
10	Lina Alsmeier	29 June 2000	1.89 m (6 ft 2 in)	70 kg (150 lb)	305 cm (120 in)	290 cm (110 in)	USC Münster
13	Corina Glaab	25 May 2000	1.80 m (5 ft 11 in)	65 kg (143 lb)	291 cm (115 in)	281 cm (111 in)	Rote Raben Vilsbiburg
14	Emilia Weske	26 March 2000	1.88 m (6 ft 2 in)	68 kg (150 lb)	299 cm (118 in)	290 cm (110 in)	SC Potsdam
16	Luisa Theresa Keller	25 August 2001	184 m (603 ft 8 in)	65 kg (143 lb)	301 cm (119 in)	285 cm (112 in)	USC Münster

=== Slovenia ===
The following is the Slovenian roster in the 2017 FIVB Girls' U18 World Championship.

Head coach: Joze Casar

No.	Name	Date of birth	Height	Weight	Spike	Block	2017 club
1	Tonka Pucnik	21 April 2000	1.82 m (6 ft 0 in)	66 kg (146 lb)	288 cm (113 in)	268 cm (106 in)	OK NOVA KBM BRANIK
2	Eva Pogacar	14 July 2000	1.85 m (6 ft 1 in)	70 kg (150 lb)	293 cm (115 in)	270 cm (110 in)	MLADI JESENICE
4	Zana Zdovc Sporer	22 March 2002	1.86 m (6 ft 1 in)	70 kg (150 lb)	290 cm (110 in)	267 cm (105 in)	OK COMET ZRECE
5	Eva Zatkovic	2 August 2001	1.88 m (6 ft 2 in)	63 kg (139 lb)	292 cm (115 in)	269 cm (106 in)	CALCIT VOLLEYBALL
6	Alja Jerala	26 July 2000	1.78 m (5 ft 10 in)	57 kg (126 lb)	288 cm (113 in)	257 cm (101 in)	OK NOVA KBM BRANIK
7	Nika Bavdaz	4 July 2000	1.77 m (5 ft 10 in)	63 kg (139 lb)	288 cm (113 in)	258 cm (102 in)	OK GORICA
8	Brina Bracko	12 January 2000	1.80 m (5 ft 11 in)	60 kg (130 lb)	291 cm (115 in)	254 cm (100 in)	OK NOVA KBM BRANIK
10	Ajda Scuka	23 October 2000	1.79 m (5 ft 10 in)	63 kg (139 lb)	283 cm (111 in)	260 cm (100 in)	OD KRIM
11	Nika Cigale	6 May 2000	1.80 m (5 ft 11 in)	63 kg (139 lb)	294 cm (116 in)	272 cm (107 in)	OK MOZIRJE
14	Tali Lekse	1 July 2000	1.81 m (5 ft 11 in)	65 kg (143 lb)	292 cm (115 in)	268 cm (106 in)	ŽOK MISLINJA
15	Anja Mazej	4 January 2000	1.68 m (5 ft 6 in)	50 kg (110 lb)	269 cm (106 in)	257 cm (101 in)	OK SPODNJA SAVINJSKA
18	Manja Jerala	22 January 2002	1.83 m (6 ft 0 in)	68 kg (150 lb)	286 cm (113 in)	265 cm (104 in)	CALCIT LJUBLJANA

=== South Korea ===
The following is the Korean roster in the 2017 FIVB Girls' U18 World Championship.

Head coach: Cho Wan-ki

No.	Name	Date of birth	Height	Weight	Spike	Block	2017 club
1	Choi Min-ji	24 May 2000	1.81 m (5 ft 11 in)	79 kg (174 lb)	290 cm (110 in)	280 cm (110 in)	Gangneung Girls' High School
2	Lee Ju-ah	21 August 2000	1.85 m (6 ft 1 in)	70 kg (150 lb)	280 cm (110 in)	270 cm (110 in)	Wongok High School
3	Lee Won-jeong	12 January 2000	1.77 m (5 ft 10 in)	64 kg (141 lb)	270 cm (110 in)	260 cm (100 in)	Sunmyung Girls' High School
5	Park Eun-seo	4 September 2000	1.74 m (5 ft 9 in)	58 kg (128 lb)	270 cm (110 in)	265 cm (104 in)	Suwon Girls' High School
7	Lee Ye-sol	8 June 2000	1.78 m (5 ft 10 in)	61 kg (134 lb)	280 cm (110 in)	272 cm (107 in)	Sunmyung Girls' High School
10	Ko Ui-jeong	5 July 2000	1.82 m (6 ft 0 in)	77 kg (170 lb)	260 cm (100 in)	250 cm (98 in)	Wongok High School
12	Kim Hae-bin	1 March 2000	1.57 m (5 ft 2 in)	55 kg (121 lb)	247 cm (97 in)	240 cm (94 in)	Gangneung Girls' High School
13	Kwon Min-ji	2 November 2001	1.77 m (5 ft 10 in)	69 kg (152 lb)	265 cm (104 in)	260 cm (100 in)	Daegu Girls' High School
15	Jeong Ji-yun	1 January 2001	1.79 m (5 ft 10 in)	68 kg (150 lb)	250 cm (98 in)	240 cm (94 in)	Gyeongnam Girls' High School
17	Sim Mi-og	14 March 2000	1.80 m (5 ft 11 in)	62 kg (137 lb)	281 cm (111 in)	274 cm (108 in)	Daejeon Yongsan High School
18	Park Hye-min	8 November 2000	1.80 m (5 ft 11 in)	63 kg (139 lb)	270 cm (110 in)	260 cm (100 in)	Sunmyung Girls' High School
19	Kim Da-hee	8 March 2000	1.72 m (5 ft 8 in)	61 kg (134 lb)	265 cm (104 in)	260 cm (100 in)	Wongok High School

=== Cuba ===
The following is the Cuban roster in the 2017 FIVB Girls' U18 World Championship.

Head coach: Tomas Fernandez

No.	Name	Date of birth	Height	Weight	Spike	Block	2017 club
1	Thalia Moreno	10 April 2002	1.89 m (6 ft 2 in)	76 kg (168 lb)	315 cm (124 in)	308 cm (121 in)	(Cuba) Villa Clara
2	Yailen Leslie	20 February 2001	1.78 m (5 ft 10 in)	62 kg (137 lb)	289 cm (114 in)	278 cm (109 in)	(Cuba) Las Tunas
3	Elizabeth Vicet (C)	9 August 2000	1.73 m (5 ft 8 in)	63 kg (139 lb)	293 cm (115 in)	284 cm (112 in)	(Cuba) Matanzas
4	Amelia Morozo	7 February 2002	1.86 m (6 ft 1 in)	67 kg (148 lb)	246 cm (97 in)	241 cm (95 in)	(Cuba) Camaguey
7	Odaimis Leliebre	16 January 2001	1.75 m (5 ft 9 in)	70 kg (150 lb)	228 cm (90 in)	226 cm (89 in)	(Cuba) Cienfuegos
9	Kamila Periche	10 February 2000	1.69 m (5 ft 7 in)	70 kg (150 lb)	212 cm (83 in)	208 cm (82 in)	(Cuba) La Habana
12	Ailama Cese	29 October 2000	1.88 m (6 ft 2 in)	58 kg (128 lb)	322 cm (127 in)	308 cm (121 in)	(Cuba) Mayabeque
13	Yamisleydis Viltres	26 July 2001	1.89 m (6 ft 2 in)	73 kg (161 lb)	247 cm (97 in)	244 cm (96 in)	(Cuba) Granma
14	Dadmara Navarro	20 October 2001	1.80 m (5 ft 11 in)	71 kg (157 lb)	236 cm (93 in)	234 cm (92 in)	(Cuba) La Habana
17	Daima Del Rió	9 September 2000	1.80 m (5 ft 11 in)	77 kg (170 lb)	236 cm (93 in)	234 cm (92 in)	(Cuba) La Habana
19	Evilania Martinez	11 January 2000	1.84 m (6 ft 0 in)	71 kg (157 lb)	305 cm (120 in)	300 cm (120 in)	(Cuba) Camaguey
20	Ivy Vila	22 July 2001	1.81 m (5 ft 11 in)	78 kg (172 lb)	235 cm (93 in)	232 cm (91 in)	(Cuba) Camaguey

== Pool B ==
=== United States ===
The following is the American roster in the 2017 FIVB Girls' U18 World Championship.

Head coach: Jim Stone

No.	Name	Date of birth	Height	Weight	Spike	Block	2017 club
3	Brooke Nuneviller	25 January 2000	1.80 m (5 ft 11 in)	64 kg (141 lb)	300 cm (120 in)	286 cm (113 in)	(United States) Aspire Volleyball Club
4	Mica Allison	4 March 2000	1.80 m (5 ft 11 in)	70 kg (150 lb)	298 cm (117 in)	288 cm (113 in)	(United States) Illini Elite
5	Nicklin Hames	18 January 2000	1.82 m (6 ft 0 in)	68 kg (150 lb)	305 cm (120 in)	282 cm (111 in)	(United States) K2 Volleyball
6	Selina Xu	15 May 2001	1.82 m (6 ft 0 in)	57 kg (126 lb)	310 cm (120 in)	296 cm (117 in)	(United States) Vision Volleyball
8	Madison Williams	3 December 2001	1.85 m (6 ft 1 in)	70 kg (150 lb)	325 cm (128 in)	304 cm (120 in)	(United States) Texas Advantage Volleyball Club
9	Logan Eggleston	13 November 2000	1.85 m (6 ft 1 in)	73 kg (161 lb)	316 cm (124 in)	298 cm (117 in)	(United States) Alliance Volleyball Club
11	Skylar Fields	17 February 2001	1.88 m (6 ft 2 in)	80 kg (180 lb)	326 cm (128 in)	310 cm (120 in)	(United States) Houston Juniors
14	Madison Kubik	8 January 2001	1.89 m (6 ft 2 in)	70 kg (150 lb)	314 cm (124 in)	292 cm (115 in)	(United States) Central Iowa Select
15	Kendall Kipp	12 December 2000	1.91 m (6 ft 3 in)	80 kg (180 lb)	316 cm (124 in)	296 cm (117 in)	(United States) Laguna Beach Volleyball Club
16	Madison Horin (C)	29 March 2001	1.92 m (6 ft 4 in)	80 kg (180 lb)	319 cm (126 in)	305 cm (120 in)	(United States) First Alliance
17	Holly Campbell	2 May 2000	1.93 m (6 ft 4 in)	77 kg (170 lb)	312 cm (123 in)	298 cm (117 in)	(United States) Austin Juniors Volleyball
19	Taylor Landfair	12 November 2001	1.96 m (6 ft 5 in)	68 kg (150 lb)	319 cm (126 in)	305 cm (120 in)	(United States) Elite Sports Performance

=== Russia ===
The following is the Russian roster in the 2017 FIVB Girls' U18 World Championship.

Head coach: Alexander Karikov

No.	Name	Date of birth	Height	Weight	Spike	Block	2017 club
1	Varvara Shepeleva	19 February 2000	1.80 m (5 ft 11 in)	70 kg (150 lb)	300 cm (120 in)	291 cm (115 in)	(Russia) Severyanka Cherepovets
2	Tatiana Kadochkina	21 March 2003	1.92 m (6 ft 4 in)	77 kg (170 lb)	310 cm (120 in)	292 cm (115 in)	(Russia) Dinamo Kazan
3	Aleksandra Borisova	20 June 2001	1.88 m (6 ft 2 in)	75 kg (165 lb)	305 cm (120 in)	297 cm (117 in)	(Russia) Severyanka Cherepovets
4	Polina Shemanova	21 January 2001	1.82 m (6 ft 0 in)	55 kg (121 lb)	296 cm (117 in)	290 cm (110 in)	(Russia) Nevskiye Zvezdy
5	Victoriia Pushina	9 March 2000	1.98 m (6 ft 6 in)	83 kg (183 lb)	310 cm (120 in)	302 cm (119 in)	(Russia) Severyanka Cherepovets
7	Olga Zvereva	5 March 2000	1.85 m (6 ft 1 in)	72 kg (159 lb)	290 cm (110 in)	281 cm (111 in)	(Russia) Dinamo Krasnodar
10	Veronika Rasputnaia	29 August 2001	1.76 m (5 ft 9 in)	65 kg (143 lb)	295 cm (116 in)	285 cm (112 in)	(Russia) Dinamo Moscow
11	Yulia Brovkina	31 May 2001	1.90 m (6 ft 3 in)	51 kg (112 lb)	305 cm (120 in)	295 cm (116 in)	(Russia) Dinamo Moscow
12	Irina Soboleva	18 May 2000	1.88 m (6 ft 2 in)	72 kg (159 lb)	305 cm (120 in)	295 cm (116 in)	(Russia) Severyanka Cherepovets
15	Valeriya Shevchuk	19 February 2001	1.83 m (6 ft 0 in)	65 kg (143 lb)	302 cm (119 in)	297 cm (117 in)	(Russia) Dinamo Moscow
17	Angelina Nikashova (C)	3 August 2000	1.83 m (6 ft 0 in)	67 kg (148 lb)	300 cm (120 in)	290 cm (110 in)	(Russia) Severyanka Cherepovets
18	Oxana Yakushina	24 January 2001	1.92 m (6 ft 4 in)	74 kg (163 lb)	305 cm (120 in)	297 cm (117 in)	(Russia) Zarechie Odintsovo

=== Belarus ===
The following is the Belarusian roster in the 2017 FIVB Girls' U18 World Championship.

Head coach: Natallia Melianiuk

No.	Name	Date of birth	Height	Weight	Spike	Block	2017 club
1	Lizaveta Manchak	27 July 2000	1.78 m (5 ft 10 in)	55 kg (121 lb)	280 cm (110 in)	245 cm (96 in)	(Belarus) Pribuzhie COR Viktoriya BREST
2	Vealeta Bialiauskaya	31 July 2000	1.65 m (5 ft 5 in)	50 kg (110 lb)	270 cm (110 in)	250 cm (98 in)	(Belarus) DUSH KIROVSK
4	Yuliya Kisliuk	18 January 2000	1.82 m (6 ft 0 in)	69 kg (152 lb)	290 cm (110 in)	250 cm (98 in)	(Belarus) Pribuzhie COR Viktoriya BREST
6	Vera Kastsiuchyk	27 September 2000	1.90 m (6 ft 3 in)	75 kg (165 lb)	300 cm (120 in)	260 cm (100 in)	(Belarus) Proton SARATOV
7	Agata Beksha	21 November 2000	1.90 m (6 ft 3 in)	76 kg (168 lb)	272 cm (107 in)	244 cm (96 in)	(Belarus) SDUSHOR GRODNO
8	Yuliya Miniuk	23 May 2000	1.89 m (6 ft 2 in)	83 kg (183 lb)	290 cm (110 in)	247 cm (97 in)	(Belarus) Pribuzhie COR Viktoriya BREST
9	Hanna Kniazeva (C)	30 March 2000	1.67 m (5 ft 6 in)	48 kg (106 lb)	265 cm (104 in)	230 cm (91 in)	(Belarus) Pribuzhie COR Viktoriya BREST
10	Lizaveta Shupliak	26 September 2000	1.65 m (5 ft 5 in)	54 kg (119 lb)	280 cm (110 in)	230 cm (91 in)	(Belarus) Pribuzhie COR Viktoriya BREST
11	Tatsiana Kholad	26 May 2000	1.76 m (5 ft 9 in)	73 kg (161 lb)	290 cm (110 in)	240 cm (94 in)	(Belarus) Pribuzhie COR Viktoriya BREST
12	Alina Egorowa	3 November 2000	1.84 m (6 ft 0 in)	78 kg (172 lb)	295 cm (116 in)	245 cm (96 in)	(Belarus) Pribuzhie COR Viktoriya BREST
13	Kseniya Liabiodkina	18 February 2002	1.79 m (5 ft 10 in)	62 kg (137 lb)	255 cm (100 in)	245 cm (96 in)	(Belarus) RGUOR MINSK
14	Hanna Hryshkevich	8 February 2000	1.88 m (6 ft 2 in)	82 kg (181 lb)	295 cm (116 in)	245 cm (96 in)	(Belarus) Minchanka MINSK

=== Brazil ===
The following is the Brazilian roster in the 2017 FIVB Girls' U18 World Championship.

Head coach: Mauricio Thomas

No.	Name	Date of birth	Height	Weight	Spike	Block	2017 club
1	Julia Bergmann	21 February 2001	1.96 m (6 ft 5 in)	78 kg (172 lb)	301 cm (119 in)	289 cm (114 in)	(Brazil) ABEL Havan Brusque
2	Larissa Besen	2 March 2001	1.90 m (6 ft 3 in)	74 kg (163 lb)	304 cm (120 in)	298 cm (117 in)	(Brazil) Marthin Luther - PR
3	Maria Clara Cavalcante	22 May 2000	1.76 m (5 ft 9 in)	63 kg (139 lb)	284 cm (112 in)	278 cm (109 in)	(Brazil) Fluminense Volei
5	Rosely Nogueira	6 March 2001	1.75 m (5 ft 9 in)	67 kg (148 lb)	270 cm (110 in)	265 cm (104 in)	(Brazil) Varginha Volei
7	Daniela Seibt	17 April 2000	1.90 m (6 ft 3 in)	74 kg (163 lb)	295 cm (116 in)	290 cm (110 in)	(Brazil) A.D. Guaraciaba
8	Beatriz Santana	21 August 2000	1.83 m (6 ft 0 in)	72 kg (159 lb)	291 cm (115 in)	281 cm (111 in)	(Brazil) Bradesco
9	Lanna Machado	4 January 2000	1.87 m (6 ft 2 in)	74 kg (163 lb)	298 cm (117 in)	290 cm (110 in)	(Brazil) ABEL Havan Brusque
10	Sabrina Groth	7 June 2000	1.83 m (6 ft 0 in)	64 kg (141 lb)	294 cm (116 in)	284 cm (112 in)	(Brazil) ABEL Havan Brusque
12	Daniela Cechetto	30 December 2000	1.88 m (6 ft 2 in)	68 kg (150 lb)	293 cm (115 in)	284 cm (112 in)	(Brazil) SESI São Paulo
13	Kenya Malachias (C)	29 November 2000	1.85 m (6 ft 1 in)	73 kg (161 lb)	294 cm (116 in)	280 cm (110 in)	(Brazil) Bradesco
14	Mariana Brambilla	19 March 2000	1.83 m (6 ft 0 in)	60 kg (130 lb)	293 cm (115 in)	284 cm (112 in)	(Brazil) SOGIBA
17	Tainara Santos	9 March 2000	1.90 m (6 ft 3 in)	81 kg (179 lb)	306 cm (120 in)	289 cm (114 in)	(Brazil) Hinode Barueri

=== Mexico ===
The following is the Mexican roster in the 2017 FIVB Girls' U18 World Championship.

Head coach: Jesus Ricardo

No.	Name	Date of birth	Height	Weight	Spike	Block	2017 club
1	Uxue Guereca	12 February 2001	1.76 m (5 ft 9 in)	64 kg (141 lb)	270 cm (110 in)	259 cm (102 in)	(Mexico) Jalisco
2	Valeria Salinas	2 June 2000	1.75 m (5 ft 9 in)	70 kg (150 lb)	265 cm (104 in)	252 cm (99 in)	(Mexico) Nuevo Leon
3	Grecia Castro	5 March 2001	1.80 m (5 ft 11 in)	75 kg (165 lb)	255 cm (100 in)	241 cm (95 in)	(Mexico) Baja California
4	Natalie Nava	19 October 2000	1.80 m (5 ft 11 in)	76 kg (168 lb)	295 cm (116 in)	288 cm (113 in)	(Mexico) Baja California
5	Renata Lopez	15 February 2001	1.85 m (6 ft 1 in)	74 kg (163 lb)	291 cm (115 in)	283 cm (111 in)	(Mexico) Jalisco
7	Karla Mireles (C)	25 January 2000	1.76 m (5 ft 9 in)	73 kg (161 lb)	270 cm (110 in)	250 cm (98 in)	(Mexico) Nuevo Leon
8	Melanie Parra	12 September 2002	1.76 m (5 ft 9 in)	50 kg (110 lb)	249 cm (98 in)	242 cm (95 in)	(Mexico) Sinaloa
10	Daniela Siller	25 March 2000	1.75 m (5 ft 9 in)	58 kg (128 lb)	258 cm (102 in)	249 cm (98 in)	(Mexico) Nuevo Leon
12	Joseline Palacios	20 December 2000	1.69 m (5 ft 7 in)	60 kg (130 lb)	0 cm (0 in)	0 cm (0 in)	(Mexico) Nuevo Leon
14	Sofia Maldonado	6 February 2002	1.78 m (5 ft 10 in)	58 kg (128 lb)	270 cm (110 in)	260 cm (100 in)	(Mexico) Jalisco
15	Diana Gutierrez	27 June 2002	1.80 m (5 ft 11 in)	58 kg (128 lb)	275 cm (108 in)	260 cm (100 in)	(Mexico) Nuevo Leon
19	Maria Vela	19 May 2000	1.75 m (5 ft 9 in)	64 kg (141 lb)	250 cm (98 in)	239 cm (94 in)	(Mexico) Jalisco

== Pool C ==
=== Italy ===
The following is the Italian roster in the 2017 FIVB Girls' U18 World Championship.

Head coach: Marco Mencarelli

No.	Name	Date of birth	Height	Weight	Spike	Block	2017 club
1	Terry Enweonwu	12 May 2000	1.87 m (6 ft 2 in)	86 kg (190 lb)	339 cm (133 in)	309 cm (122 in)	(Italy) Club Italia
2	Valeria Battista	23 January 2001	1.84 m (6 ft 0 in)	64 kg (141 lb)	316 cm (124 in)	300 cm (120 in)	(Italy) Foppapedretti Bergamo
5	Marina Lubian	11 April 2000	1.87 m (6 ft 2 in)	67 kg (148 lb)	304 cm (120 in)	288 cm (113 in)	(Italy) Club Italia
6	Sarah Fahr	12 September 2001	1.94 m (6 ft 4 in)	81 kg (179 lb)	314 cm (124 in)	302 cm (119 in)	(Italy) Agil Volley Novara
9	Fatime Kone	25 October 2000	1.84 m (6 ft 0 in)	73 kg (161 lb)	310 cm (120 in)	298 cm (117 in)	(Italy) Lilliput Settimo T.se
12	Elena Pietrini	17 March 2000	1.90 m (6 ft 3 in)	66 kg (146 lb)	315 cm (124 in)	305 cm (120 in)	(Italy) Volleyro' Roma
13	Alessia Populini (C)	10 September 2000	1.81 m (5 ft 11 in)	65 kg (143 lb)	304 cm (120 in)	296 cm (117 in)	(Italy) Agil Volley Novara
14	Sara Panetoni	6 May 2000	1.75 m (5 ft 9 in)	59 kg (130 lb)	294 cm (116 in)	288 cm (113 in)	(Italy) Robur Costa Ravenna
16	Francesca Scola	15 September 2001	1.76 m (5 ft 9 in)	70 kg (150 lb)	292 cm (115 in)	286 cm (113 in)	(Italy) Volleyrò Roma
17	Alice Tanase	25 May 2000	1.78 m (5 ft 10 in)	71 kg (157 lb)	302 cm (119 in)	296 cm (117 in)	(Italy) Volleyrò Roma
18	Rachele Morello	7 November 2000	1.82 m (6 ft 0 in)	77 kg (170 lb)	302 cm (119 in)	296 cm (117 in)	(Italy) Club Italia
21	Virginia Peruzzo	7 November 2000	1.78 m (5 ft 10 in)	81 kg (179 lb)	296 cm (117 in)	288 cm (113 in)	(Italy) UYBA Busto Arsizio

=== Serbia ===
The following is the Serbian roster in the 2017 FIVB Girls' U18 World Championship.

Head coach: Jovo Cakovic

No.	Name	Date of birth	Height	Weight	Spike	Block	2017 club
1	Sara Caric	1 February 2001	1.93 m (6 ft 4 in)	73 kg (161 lb)	300 cm (120 in)	290 cm (110 in)	(Serbia) Vizura Beograd
3	Andjelija Draskovic	8 September 2000	1.77 m (5 ft 10 in)	62 kg (137 lb)	290 cm (110 in)	279 cm (110 in)	(Serbia) Jendinstvo Stara Pazova
4	Isidora Rodic	27 January 2001	1.85 m (6 ft 1 in)	70 kg (150 lb)	290 cm (110 in)	280 cm (110 in)	(Serbia) Vizura Beograd
5	Mila Kocic	31 August 2001	1.67 m (5 ft 6 in)	58 kg (128 lb)	268 cm (106 in)	253 cm (100 in)	(Serbia) Vizura Beograd
7	Dejana Lekic	8 March 2000	1.80 m (5 ft 11 in)	63 kg (139 lb)	298 cm (117 in)	287 cm (113 in)	(Serbia) Crvena Zvezda Beograd
8	Barbara Batinic	4 October 2001	1.85 m (6 ft 1 in)	63 kg (139 lb)	303 cm (119 in)	294 cm (116 in)	(Serbia) Spartak Subotica
9	Rada Perovic	13 April 2001	1.80 m (5 ft 11 in)	72 kg (159 lb)	291 cm (115 in)	280 cm (110 in)	(Serbia) KLEK Klek
10	Miljana Glusac	3 September 2000	1.84 m (6 ft 0 in)	72 kg (159 lb)	295 cm (116 in)	287 cm (113 in)	(Serbia) FOK Novi Sad
11	Milica Milunovic	27 February 2001	1.81 m (5 ft 11 in)	63 kg (139 lb)	287 cm (113 in)	276 cm (109 in)	(Serbia) Crvena Zvezda Beograd
12	Jovana Mirosavljevic (C)	16 January 2000	1.82 m (6 ft 0 in)	63 kg (139 lb)	288 cm (113 in)	280 cm (110 in)	(Serbia) Jendinstvo Stara Pazova
13	Ana-Marija Jonjev	1 January 2000	1.75 m (5 ft 9 in)	61 kg (134 lb)	270 cm (110 in)	261 cm (103 in)	(Serbia) Crvena Zvezda Beograd
17	Veronika Djokic	27 August 2001	1.87 m (6 ft 2 in)	76 kg (168 lb)	298 cm (117 in)	289 cm (114 in)	(Serbia) Jendinstvo Stara Pazova

=== Poland ===
The following is the Polish roster in the 2017 FIVB Girls' U18 World Championship.

Head coach: Rafal Gasior

No.	Name	Date of birth	Height	Weight	Spike	Block	2017 club
2	Malgorzata Andersohn	4 November 2000	1.70 m (5 ft 7 in)	65 kg (143 lb)	286 cm (113 in)	274 cm (108 in)	(Poland) KS Palac Bydgoszcz
3	Monika Jagla	4 April 2000	1.77 m (5 ft 10 in)	69 kg (152 lb)	298 cm (117 in)	285 cm (112 in)	(Poland) KS Palac Bydgoszcz
4	Julia Szczurowska	29 July 2001	1.88 m (6 ft 2 in)	85 kg (187 lb)	303 cm (119 in)	291 cm (115 in)	(Poland) Mloda Gwardia Wroclaw
7	Rozalia Hnatyszyn	17 August 2000	1.85 m (6 ft 1 in)	62 kg (137 lb)	301 cm (119 in)	287 cm (113 in)	(Poland) GEDANIA S.A. Gdansk
8	Zuzanna Gorecka	10 April 2000	1.81 m (5 ft 11 in)	63 kg (139 lb)	301 cm (119 in)	284 cm (112 in)	(Poland) LTS Legionovia Legionowo
9	Paulina Damaske	1 January 2001	1.78 m (5 ft 10 in)	64 kg (141 lb)	304 cm (120 in)	292 cm (115 in)	(Poland) GEDANIA S.A. Gdansk
10	Adrianna Rybak	29 September 2000	1.88 m (6 ft 2 in)	72 kg (159 lb)	300 cm (120 in)	287 cm (113 in)	(Poland) GEDANIA S.A. Gdansk
12	Oliwia Baluk (C)	17 May 2000	1.75 m (5 ft 9 in)	62 kg (137 lb)	288 cm (113 in)	279 cm (110 in)	(Poland) Chemik Police
13	Klaudia Laskowska	23 January 2000	1.88 m (6 ft 2 in)	77 kg (170 lb)	303 cm (119 in)	291 cm (115 in)	(Poland) KS Palac Bydgoszcz
14	Paulina Zaborowska	7 June 2000	1.79 m (5 ft 10 in)	66 kg (146 lb)	290 cm (110 in)	271 cm (107 in)	(Poland) LTS Legionovia Legionowo
16	Julia Mazur	17 April 2001	1.69 m (5 ft 7 in)	62 kg (137 lb)	286 cm (113 in)	270 cm (110 in)	(Poland) Pomorzanin Szczecin
18	Aleksandra Gryka	6 February 2000	1.90 m (6 ft 3 in)	71 kg (157 lb)	302 cm (119 in)	278 cm (109 in)	(Poland) LTS Legionovia Legionowo

=== Colombia ===
The following is the Colombian roster in the 2017 FIVB Girls' U18 World Championship.

Head coach: Antonio Rizola

No.	Name	Date of birth	Height	Weight	Spike	Block	2017 club
1	Darlevis Mosquera	23 June 2000	1.80 m (5 ft 11 in)	51 kg (112 lb)	306 cm (120 in)	296 cm (117 in)	(Colombia) Bolivar
3	Valentina Bahamon	20 October 2001	1.87 m (6 ft 2 in)	66 kg (146 lb)	298 cm (117 in)	285 cm (112 in)	(Colombia) Bolivar
5	Ana Karina Olaya	13 September 2002	1.87 m (6 ft 2 in)	78 kg (172 lb)	312 cm (123 in)	297 cm (117 in)	(Colombia) Liga Vallecaucana
6	Valerin Carabali (C)	25 October 2000	1.83 m (6 ft 0 in)	67 kg (148 lb)	301 cm (119 in)	286 cm (113 in)	(Colombia) Liga Vallecaucana
8	Emelys Martinez	8 May 2000	1.82 m (6 ft 0 in)	60 kg (130 lb)	270 cm (110 in)	265 cm (104 in)	(Colombia) Bolivar
9	Maria Sarmiento	30 March 2000	1.65 m (5 ft 5 in)	56 kg (123 lb)	273 cm (107 in)	270 cm (110 in)	(Colombia) Valle
10	Briyith Prado	19 March 2000	1.63 m (5 ft 4 in)	56 kg (123 lb)	270 cm (110 in)	255 cm (100 in)	(Colombia) Valle
11	Lina Espejo	7 June 2001	1.76 m (5 ft 9 in)	56 kg (123 lb)	288 cm (113 in)	278 cm (109 in)	(Colombia) Bogota
14	Angie Velasquez	13 June 2000	1.71 m (5 ft 7 in)	58 kg (128 lb)	275 cm (108 in)	264 cm (104 in)	(Colombia) Cundinamarca
15	Manuela Ibarguen	19 December 2001	1.78 m (5 ft 10 in)	69 kg (152 lb)	293 cm (115 in)	287 cm (113 in)	(Colombia) Valle
18	Kenia Mendoza	1 July 2002	1.81 m (5 ft 11 in)	75 kg (165 lb)	287 cm (113 in)	275 cm (108 in)	(Colombia) Bolivar
20	Wendy Martinez	29 August 2000	1.85 m (6 ft 1 in)	65 kg (143 lb)	290 cm (110 in)	277 cm (109 in)	(Colombia) Bolivar

=== Thailand ===
The following is the Thai roster in the 2017 FIVB Girls' U18 World Championship.

Head coach: Jarun Niemtubtim

No.	Name	Date of birth	Height	Weight	Spike	Block	2017 club
3	Parichat Intharasit	22 July 2001	1.67 m (5 ft 6 in)	57 kg (126 lb)	268 cm (106 in)	258 cm (102 in)	(Thailand) 3BB Nakornnont
6	Prapatsorn Kongudom	20 July 2000	1.68 m (5 ft 6 in)	55 kg (121 lb)	282 cm (111 in)	265 cm (104 in)	(Thailand) King-Bangkok
7	Tichakorn Boonlert	22 March 2001	1.80 m (5 ft 11 in)	78 kg (172 lb)	294 cm (116 in)	283 cm (111 in)	(Thailand) 3BB Nakornnont
9	Usa Daowern	26 January 2000	1.80 m (5 ft 11 in)	72 kg (159 lb)	304 cm (120 in)	285 cm (112 in)	(Thailand) Thai-Denmark Nongrua
10	Yuwalee Choksamai	22 April 2000	1.65 m (5 ft 5 in)	62 kg (137 lb)	267 cm (105 in)	258 cm (102 in)	(Thailand) King-Bangkok
11	Ruchisaya Kansattru	12 September 2000	1.61 m (5 ft 3 in)	60 kg (130 lb)	263 cm (104 in)	254 cm (100 in)	(Thailand) Wat Chainawat School
13	Pannapa Chanphuk (C)	3 February 2000	1.73 m (5 ft 8 in)	63 kg (139 lb)	287 cm (113 in)	280 cm (110 in)	(Thailand) King-Bangkok
15	Aonanong Saisri	28 January 2001	1.70 m (5 ft 7 in)	60 kg (130 lb)	287 cm (113 in)	271 cm (107 in)	(Thailand) 3BB Nakornnont
16	Chularak Nuanboribun	21 July 2000	1.68 m (5 ft 6 in)	58 kg (128 lb)	287 cm (113 in)	276 cm (109 in)	(Thailand) King-Bangkok
17	Chuleeporn Ritwisat	31 July 2001	1.75 m (5 ft 9 in)	57 kg (126 lb)	287 cm (113 in)	274 cm (108 in)	(Thailand) Supreme Chonburi
18	Oanchisa Lonok	27 April 2000	1.77 m (5 ft 10 in)	75 kg (165 lb)	292 cm (115 in)	276 cm (109 in)	(Thailand) Thai-Denmark Nongrua
19	Piyarat Buddawong	15 February 2001	1.69 m (5 ft 7 in)	64 kg (141 lb)	282 cm (111 in)	276 cm (109 in)	(Thailand) King-Bangkok

== Pool D ==
=== China ===
The following is the Chinese roster in the 2017 FIVB Girls' U18 World Championship.

Head coach: Xu Jiande

No.	Name	Date of birth	Height	Weight	Spike	Block	2017 club
1	Che Wenhan	11 April 2000	1.93 m (6 ft 4 in)	67 kg (148 lb)	305 cm (120 in)	297 cm (117 in)	(China) Shandong
3	Liu Yu	13 May 2001	1.86 m (6 ft 1 in)	72 kg (159 lb)	317 cm (125 in)	311 cm (122 in)	(China) Zhejiang
4	Fang Jingyi	9 July 2001	1.84 m (6 ft 0 in)	65 kg (143 lb)	281 cm (111 in)	265 cm (104 in)	(China) Fujian
5	Liu Jingjing	13 March 2000	1.83 m (6 ft 0 in)	71 kg (157 lb)	302 cm (119 in)	294 cm (116 in)	(China) Guangdong
6	Jiao Dian	8 September 2000	1.93 m (6 ft 4 in)	72 kg (159 lb)	297 cm (117 in)	292 cm (115 in)	(China) Bayi
7	Zhang Jiaxin	20 April 2000	1.83 m (6 ft 0 in)	64 kg (141 lb)	320 cm (130 in)	310 cm (120 in)	(China) Guangdong
8	Liang Weifan	26 November 2000	1.85 m (6 ft 1 in)	65 kg (143 lb)	310 cm (120 in)	300 cm (120 in)	(China) Fujian
9	Sun Yuqing	18 February 2001	1.87 m (6 ft 2 in)	63 kg (139 lb)	320 cm (130 in)	310 cm (120 in)	(China) Liaoning
10	Cui Meichen	17 September 2000	1.88 m (6 ft 2 in)	73 kg (161 lb)	300 cm (120 in)	290 cm (110 in)	(China) Bayi
11	Sun Pingyuan	6 April 2001	1.86 m (6 ft 1 in)	68 kg (150 lb)	304 cm (120 in)	298 cm (117 in)	(China) Henan
12	Zhang Zihan	2 May 2000	1.84 m (6 ft 0 in)	75 kg (165 lb)	291 cm (115 in)	282 cm (111 in)	(China) Henan
14	Chen Fanglin (C)	2 September 2000	1.80 m (5 ft 11 in)	67 kg (148 lb)	310 cm (120 in)	300 cm (120 in)	(China) Shanghai

=== Turkey ===
The following is the Turkish roster in the 2017 FIVB Girls' U18 World Championship.

Head coach: Sahin Catma

No.	Name	Date of birth	Height	Weight	Spike	Block	2017 club
1	Simay Kurt	29 July 2000	1.73 m (5 ft 8 in)	68 kg (150 lb)	260 cm (100 in)	285 cm (112 in)	(Turkey) Beylikudüzü İhtisas
2	Elif Sahin	19 January 2001	1.90 m (6 ft 3 in)	68 kg (150 lb)	302 cm (119 in)	300 cm (120 in)	(Turkey) Karayollari
3	Eylül Karadas	3 September 2001	1.75 m (5 ft 9 in)	67 kg (148 lb)	280 cm (110 in)	278 cm (109 in)	(Turkey) İller Bankası
5	Merve Atlier	31 March 2000	1.91 m (6 ft 3 in)	70 kg (150 lb)	310 cm (120 in)	296 cm (117 in)	(Turkey) Eczacıbaşı VitrA
9	Ezgi Kara	27 December 2000	1.85 m (6 ft 1 in)	71 kg (157 lb)	299 cm (118 in)	297 cm (117 in)	(Turkey) Halkbank
11	Zeynep Uzen	15 May 2000	1.82 m (6 ft 0 in)	66 kg (146 lb)	293 cm (115 in)	278 cm (109 in)	(Turkey) Eczacıbaşı VitrA
12	Ilkin Aydin (C)	5 January 2000	1.83 m (6 ft 0 in)	67 kg (148 lb)	300 cm (120 in)	284 cm (112 in)	(Turkey) İller Bankası
14	Yaprak Erkek	2 September 2001	1.82 m (6 ft 0 in)	60 kg (130 lb)	300 cm (120 in)	286 cm (113 in)	(Turkey) İller Bankası
15	Selen Durusoy	22 February 2000	1.83 m (6 ft 0 in)	78 kg (172 lb)	298 cm (117 in)	296 cm (117 in)	(Turkey) Eczacıbaşı VitrA
17	Derya Cebecioglu	24 October 2000	1.85 m (6 ft 1 in)	65 kg (143 lb)	290 cm (110 in)	280 cm (110 in)	(Turkey) VakıfBank
18	Ebrar Karakurt	17 January 2000	1.96 m (6 ft 5 in)	72 kg (159 lb)	307 cm (121 in)	305 cm (120 in)	(Turkey) VakıfBank
20	Ilayda Isçimen	15 February 2000	1.83 m (6 ft 0 in)	72 kg (159 lb)	285 cm (112 in)	283 cm (111 in)	(Turkey) İller Bankası

=== Japan ===
The following is the Japanese roster in the 2017 FIVB Girls' U18 World Championship.

Head coach: Daichi Saegusa

No.	Name	Date of birth	Height	Weight	Spike	Block	2017 club
1	Tsukasa Nakagawa	13 August 2000	1.59 m (5 ft 3 in)	57 kg (126 lb)	265 cm (104 in)	255 cm (100 in)	(Japan) Kinrankai High School
2	Shuri Kurata (C)	22 November 2000	1.69 m (5 ft 7 in)	57 kg (126 lb)	281 cm (111 in)	270 cm (110 in)	(Japan) Sundai Gakuen High School
3	Rena Mizusugi	6 April 2000	1.61 m (5 ft 3 in)	47 kg (104 lb)	265 cm (104 in)	255 cm (100 in)	(Japan) Kinrankai High School
4	Mao Ito	23 June 2000	1.77 m (5 ft 10 in)	71 kg (157 lb)	292 cm (115 in)	278 cm (109 in)	(Japan) Fujimi High School
5	Haruna Soga	25 March 2001	1.72 m (5 ft 8 in)	62 kg (137 lb)	304 cm (120 in)	293 cm (115 in)	(Japan) Kinrankai High School
6	Nichika Yamada	24 February 2000	1.83 m (6 ft 0 in)	70 kg (150 lb)	300 cm (120 in)	290 cm (110 in)	(Japan) Toyohashi Chuo High School
7	Megumi Nakazawa	28 May 2000	1.71 m (5 ft 7 in)	62 kg (137 lb)	288 cm (113 in)	280 cm (110 in)	(Japan) Kinrankai High School
8	Yuki Nishikawa	4 September 2000	1.78 m (5 ft 10 in)	59 kg (130 lb)	290 cm (110 in)	275 cm (108 in)	(Japan) Kinrankai High School
9	Yuri Takayanagi	19 April 2000	1.77 m (5 ft 10 in)	69 kg (152 lb)	289 cm (114 in)	280 cm (110 in)	(Japan) Osaka Kokusai Takii HS
10	Ayaka Araki	2 September 2001	1.84 m (6 ft 0 in)	74 kg (163 lb)	295 cm (116 in)	285 cm (112 in)	(Japan) Higashi Kyushu Ryukoku HS
11	Rui Nonaka	3 August 2001	1.76 m (5 ft 9 in)	60 kg (130 lb)	295 cm (116 in)	279 cm (110 in)	(Japan) Akita Kita High School
12	Ameze Miyabe	12 October 2001	1.73 m (5 ft 8 in)	54 kg (119 lb)	304 cm (120 in)	280 cm (110 in)	(Japan) Kinrankai High School

=== Peru ===
The following is the Peruvian roster in the 2017 FIVB Girls' U18 World Championship.

Head coach: Marco Queiroga

No.	Name	Date of birth	Height	Weight	Spike	Block	2017 club
1	Danitza Llara	6 September 2000	1.77 m (5 ft 10 in)	69 kg (152 lb)	289 cm (114 in)	281 cm (111 in)	(Peru) Club Tupac Amaru
3	Claudia Palza	4 July 2001	1.83 m (6 ft 0 in)	71 kg (157 lb)	288 cm (113 in)	280 cm (110 in)	(Peru) Club Deportivo Geminis
5	Nayeli Vilchez	27 June 2000	1.79 m (5 ft 10 in)	65 kg (143 lb)	290 cm (110 in)	287 cm (113 in)	(Peru) Club Deportivo Geminis
6	Aixa Vigil	23 September 2001	1.80 m (5 ft 11 in)	65 kg (143 lb)	284 cm (112 in)	295 cm (116 in)	(Peru) Club Univ. Cesar Vallejo
7	Flavia Montes (C)	22 November 2000	1.87 m (6 ft 2 in)	60 kg (130 lb)	295 cm (116 in)	290 cm (110 in)	(Peru) Club Sporting Cristal
8	Shanaiya Ayme	3 March 2001	1.79 m (5 ft 10 in)	60 kg (130 lb)	285 cm (112 in)	290 cm (110 in)	(Peru) Club Alianza Lima
9	Ariagna Linares	30 March 2000	1.78 m (5 ft 10 in)	60 kg (130 lb)	280 cm (110 in)	283 cm (111 in)	(Peru) Club Univ. San Martin de Porres
10	Thaisa Mc Leod	1 January 2002	1.89 m (6 ft 2 in)	75 kg (165 lb)	301 cm (119 in)	305 cm (120 in)	(Peru) Club Sporting Cristal
11	Kiara Montes	13 January 2001	1.76 m (5 ft 9 in)	68 kg (150 lb)	282 cm (111 in)	293 cm (115 in)	(Peru) Club Sporting Cristal
12	Zandra Del Aguila	17 February 2000	1.78 m (5 ft 10 in)	68 kg (150 lb)	289 cm (114 in)	290 cm (110 in)	(Peru) Club Deportivo Geminis
17	Yadhira Anchante	19 November 2002	1.78 m (5 ft 10 in)	59 kg (130 lb)	286 cm (113 in)	290 cm (110 in)	(Peru) Club Tupac Amarú
18	Valeria Takeda	5 February 2000	1.62 m (5 ft 4 in)	58 kg (128 lb)	250 cm (98 in)	263 cm (104 in)	(Peru) Club Univ. Cesar Vallejo

=== Dominican Republic ===
The following is the Dominican roster in the 2017 FIVB Girls' U18 World Championship.

Head coach: Alexandre Ceccato

No.	Name	Date of birth	Height	Weight	Spike	Block	2017 club
1	Erika Asencio	2 April 2000	1.75 m (5 ft 9 in)	65 kg (143 lb)	279 cm (110 in)	267 cm (105 in)	(Dominican Republic) Deportivo Nacional
3	Hennesys Lalane	10 April 2000	1.85 m (6 ft 1 in)	74 kg (163 lb)	275 cm (108 in)	263 cm (104 in)	(Dominican Republic) Deportivo Nacional
4	Yanlis Feliz	3 June 2000	1.81 m (5 ft 11 in)	69 kg (152 lb)	282 cm (111 in)	263 cm (104 in)	(Dominican Republic) Pedernales
5	Yaneirys Rodriguez	26 June 2000	1.71 m (5 ft 7 in)	56 kg (123 lb)	280 cm (110 in)	251 cm (99 in)	(Dominican Republic) Bonao
6	Mesalina Yosil	18 July 2000	1.85 m (6 ft 1 in)	63 kg (139 lb)	283 cm (111 in)	272 cm (107 in)	(Dominican Republic) Deportivo Nacional
7	Raquel Rodriguez	12 July 2000	1.83 m (6 ft 0 in)	60 kg (130 lb)	284 cm (112 in)	268 cm (106 in)	(Dominican Republic) Deportivo Nacional
8	Natalia Martínez (C)	25 November 2000	1.86 m (6 ft 1 in)	71 kg (157 lb)	300 cm (120 in)	275 cm (108 in)	(Dominican Republic) Mirador
9	Madeline Guillen	4 June 2001	1.86 m (6 ft 1 in)	74 kg (163 lb)	273 cm (107 in)	242 cm (95 in)	(Dominican Republic) Malanga
11	Geraldine González	18 April 2002	1.93 m (6 ft 4 in)	64 kg (141 lb)	273 cm (107 in)	245 cm (96 in)	(Dominican Republic) Deportivo Nacional
13	Flormarie Colon	21 October 2002	1.72 m (5 ft 8 in)	70 kg (150 lb)	160 cm (63 in)	175 cm (69 in)	(Dominican Republic) Deportivo Nacional
14	Miriela Jimenez	10 May 2001	1.94 m (6 ft 4 in)	86 kg (190 lb)	285 cm (112 in)	277 cm (109 in)	(Dominican Republic) Deportivo Nacional
16	Camila Herrera	2 July 2001	1.78 m (5 ft 10 in)	73 kg (161 lb)	273 cm (107 in)	260 cm (100 in)	(Dominican Republic) Deportivo Nacional
