= 2026 Girls' U19 South American Volleyball Championship =

Tournament details
- Host country: Venezuela
- City: Maracaibo
- Dates: 7–11 October 2026
- Teams: 8
- Venue: 1 (in 1 host city)

Final positions
- Champions: Argentina (4th title)
- Runners-up: Peru
- Third place: Brazil
- Fourth place: Venezuela

Tournament statistics
- Matches played: 20

The 2026 Girls' U19 South American Volleyball Championship was the 24th edition of the Girls' U19 South American Volleyball Championship, a biennial international youth volleyball tournament organised by the Confederación Sudamericana de Voleibol (CSV) for the girls' under-19 national teams of South America. It was held in Maracaibo, Venezuela from 7 to 11 October 2026.

Same as previous editions, the tournament acted as the CSV qualifiers for the FIVB Volleyball Girls' U19 World Championship. The top three teams qualified for the 2027 FIVB Volleyball Girls' U19 World Championship as the CSV representatives.

Argentina won their fourth title by beating Peru 3–0 in the final. Defending champions Brazil failed to retain their title but secured a spot on the podium after defeating the hosts Venezuela in the third-place match. Champions Argentina, runners-up Peru and third-place Brazil qualified for the 2027 FIVB Volleyball Girls' U19 World Championship.

== Host and venue ==
Maracaibo	Location map of the venue
Gimnasio Pedro Elías Belisario Aponte	Location map of the venue
Capacity: 4,500	Location map of the venue

Maracaibo, Venezuela was confirmed as host city of the tournament on 25 July 2026, following a notification from the CSV to the Venezuelan Volleyball Federation. This was subsequently ratified at the 77th CSV Ordinary Congress held on 28 July 2026 in Lima, Peru. It was the fourth time that Venezuela hosted the tournament having previously done so in 1992, 2000 and 2002.

The competition was entirely played at the Gimnasio Pedro Elías Belisario Aponte, which is part of the Luis Aparicio Montiel Sports and Recreation Complex. The teams' training sessions took place at Gimnasio Dr. Antonio Borjas Romero owned by University of Zulia.

== Teams ==
Seven of the twelve CSV member associations entered the tournament.

Team	App	Previous best performance
Argentina (holders)	23rd	Champions (1996, 2018, 2022)
Bolivia	10th	Fifth place (1990, 1992, 1998, 2000, 2022)
Brazil (hosts)	24th	Champions (17 times, most recent 2024)
Chile	23rd	Third place (2022)
Ecuador	3rd	Seventh place (2018)
Peru	24th	Champions (1978, 1980, 2012)
Uruguay	14th	Fourth place (1988)
Venezuela	18th	Third place (1994, 2002, 2004, 2008)

=== Squads ===
Each national team had to register a squad of a minimum of 12 and a maximum of 14 players players. Players born on or after 1 January 2009 were eligible to compete in the tournament.

== Competition format ==
The competition format depends on the number of participating teams. With 7 teams two groups were formed, one of three teams and the other of four, which were played on a single round-robin basis. The group standing procedure was as follows:

1. Number of matches won;
2. Match points;
  - Match won 3–0: 3 match points for the winner, 0 match points for the loser
  - Match won 3–1: 3 match points for the winner, 0 match point for the loser
  - Match won 3–2: 2 match points for the winner, 1 match points for the loser
3. Sets ratio;
4. Points ratio;
5. If the tie continues between two teams: result of the last match between the tied teams;
6. If the tie continues between three or more teams: a new classification would be made taking into consideration only the matches between involved teams.

== Classification phase ==
All match times are local times, VET (UTC-4).

=== Group A ===
Pos	Team	Pld	W	L	Pts	SW	SL	SR	SPW	SPL	SPR	Qualification
1	Peru	3	3	0	9	9	2	4.500	264	216	1.222	Semi-finals
2	Venezuela (H)	3	2	1	6	7	3	2.333	234	187	1.251	Semi-finals
3	Chile	3	1	2	3	4	6	0.667	210	238	0.882	5th–8th semi-finals
4	Uruguay	3	0	3	0	0	9	0.000	158	225	0.702	5th–8th semi-finals

Source: FIVB
Rules for classification: Tiebreakers
(H) Host

Date	Time		Score		Set 1	Set 2	Set 3	Set 4	Set 5	Total	Attd	Report
7 Oct	18:00	Chile	1–3	Peru	24–26	12–25	25–21	19–25		80–97	5,120	P2 Report
7 Oct	20:00	Venezuela	3–0	Uruguay	25–9	25–17	25–14			75–40	5,280	P2 Report
8 Oct	18:00	Chile	3–0	Uruguay	25–23	25–23	25–20			75–66	2,435	P2 Report
8 Oct	20:00	Venezuela	1–3	Peru	19–25	25–17	23–25	17–25		84–92	4,027	P2 Report
9 Oct	16:00	Peru	3–0	Uruguay	25–23	25–18	25–11			75–52	733	P2 Report
9 Oct	20:00	Venezuela	3–0	Chile	25–21	25–18	25–16			75–55	5,066	P2 Report

=== Group B ===
Pos	Team	Pld	W	L	Pts	SW	SL	SR	SPW	SPL	SPR	Qualification
1	Argentina	3	3	0	9	9	1	9.000	255	178	1.433	Semi-finals
2	Brazil	3	2	1	6	7	4	1.750	272	220	1.236	Semi-finals
3	Bolivia	3	1	2	3	4	6	0.667	189	229	0.825	5th–8th semi-finals
4	Ecuador	3	0	3	0	0	9	0.000	136	225	0.604	5th–8th semi-finals

Source: FIVB
Rules for classification: Tiebreakers

Date	Time		Score		Set 1	Set 2	Set 3	Set 4	Set 5	Total	Attd	Report
7 Oct	14:00	Argentina	3–0	Ecuador	25–8	25–8	25–20			75–36	350	P2 Report
7 Oct	16:00	Brazil	1–3	Bolivia	22–25	25–15	25–16	25–16		97–72	850	P2 Report
8 Oct	14:00	Argentina	3–0	Bolivia	25–15	25–13	25–14			75–42	334	P2 Report
8 Oct	16:00	Brazil	3–0	Ecuador	25–16	25–9	25–18			75–43	884	P2 Report
9 Oct	14:00	Bolivia	3–0	Ecuador	25–19	25–17	25–21			75–57	296	P2 Report
9 Oct	18:00	Brazil	1–3	Argentina	23–25	25–27	30–28	22–25		100–105	3,427	P2 Report

== Final phase ==
All match times are local times, VET (UTC-4).

=== 5th–8th places ===
5th–8th semi-finals
10 October
Uruguay	1
Bolivia	3
10 October
Chile	3
Ecuador	1

5th place match
11 October
Bolivia	3
Chile	0
7th place match
11 October
Uruguay	3
Ecuador	2

==== 5th–8th semi-finals ====
Date	Time		Score		Set 1	Set 2	Set 3	Set 4	Set 5	Total	Attd	Report
10 Oct	14:00	Uruguay	1–3	Bolivia	28–26	14–25	21–25	23–25		86–101	376	P2 Report
10 Oct	16:00	Chile	3–1	Ecuador	25–23	19–25	25–20	25–20		94–88	3,488	P2 Report

==== 7th place match ====
Date	Time		Score		Set 1	Set 2	Set 3	Set 4	Set 5	Total	Attd	Report
11 Oct	12:00	Uruguay	3–2	Ecuador	25–15	25–16	20–25	11–25	15–11	96–92	224	P2 Report

==== 5th place match ====
Date	Time		Score		Set 1	Set 2	Set 3	Set 4	Set 5	Total	Attd	Report
11 Oct	14:30	Bolivia	3–0	Chile	25–20	25–23	27–25			77–68		P2 Report

=== 1st–4th places ===
Semi-finals
10 October
Peru	3
Brazil	2
10 October
Argentina	3
Venezuela	1

Final
11 October
Peru	0
Argentina	3
3rd place match
11 October
Brazil	3
Venezuela	1

==== Semi-finals ====
Date	Time		Score		Set 1	Set 2	Set 3	Set 4	Set 5	Total	Attd	Report
10 Oct	18:00	Peru	3–2	Brazil	25–15	16–25	25–21	17–25	15–7	98–93	5,032	P2 Report
10 Oct	20:00	Argentina	3–1	Venezuela	25–16	16–25	25–23	25–12		91–76	5,293	P2 Report

==== 3rd place match ====
Date	Time		Score		Set 1	Set 2	Set 3	Set 4	Set 5	Total	Attd	Report
11 Oct	17:00	Brazil	3–1	Venezuela	23–25	25–21	25–13	25–22		98–81		P2 Report

==== Final ====
Date	Time		Score		Set 1	Set 2	Set 3	Set 4	Set 5	Total	Attd	Report
11 Oct	20:00	Peru	0–3	Argentina	12–25	12–25	15–25			39–75	3,756	P2 Report

== Final standing ==
Qualified for 2027 FIVB Girls' U19 World Championship.

Rank	Team
1st place, gold medalist(s)	Argentina
2nd place, silver medalist(s)	Peru
3rd place, bronze medalist(s)	Brazil
4	Venezuela
5	Bolivia
6	Chile
7	Uruguay
8	Ecuador

2026 Girls' U19 South American Championship champions

Argentina
Fourth title

Team Roster:

1 Agustina Pérez (C), 2 Azul Pérez Tucci (L), 3 Abril Faiazzo, 4 Abril Cano, 5 Sofía Cicchelli, 6 Pilar Mannarino, 7 Sofía Baldo, 9 Emma Oldani, 10 Abril Araya, 11 Catalina Borrero, 14 Zoe Policella (L), 15 Linda Landi, 18 Martina Vanni, 23 Violeta Efrón

Head coach: (Argentina) Nicolás Efrón

== Individual awards ==
The following individual awards were presented at the end of the tournament.

- Most valuable player (MVP)

Sofía Baldo (ARG)

- Best middle blockers

Karina Lima (BRA)
Catalina Romero (PER)

- Best setter

Marcela Manrique (PER)

- Best opposite spiker

Emma Oldani (ARG)

- Best outside spikers

Sofía Baldo (ARG)
Catalina Borrero (ARG)

- Best libero

Ihara Arias (VEN)

== See also ==
- 2026 Boys' U19 South American Volleyball Championship
