= Francynne Jacintho =

Brazilian volleyball player (born 1993)

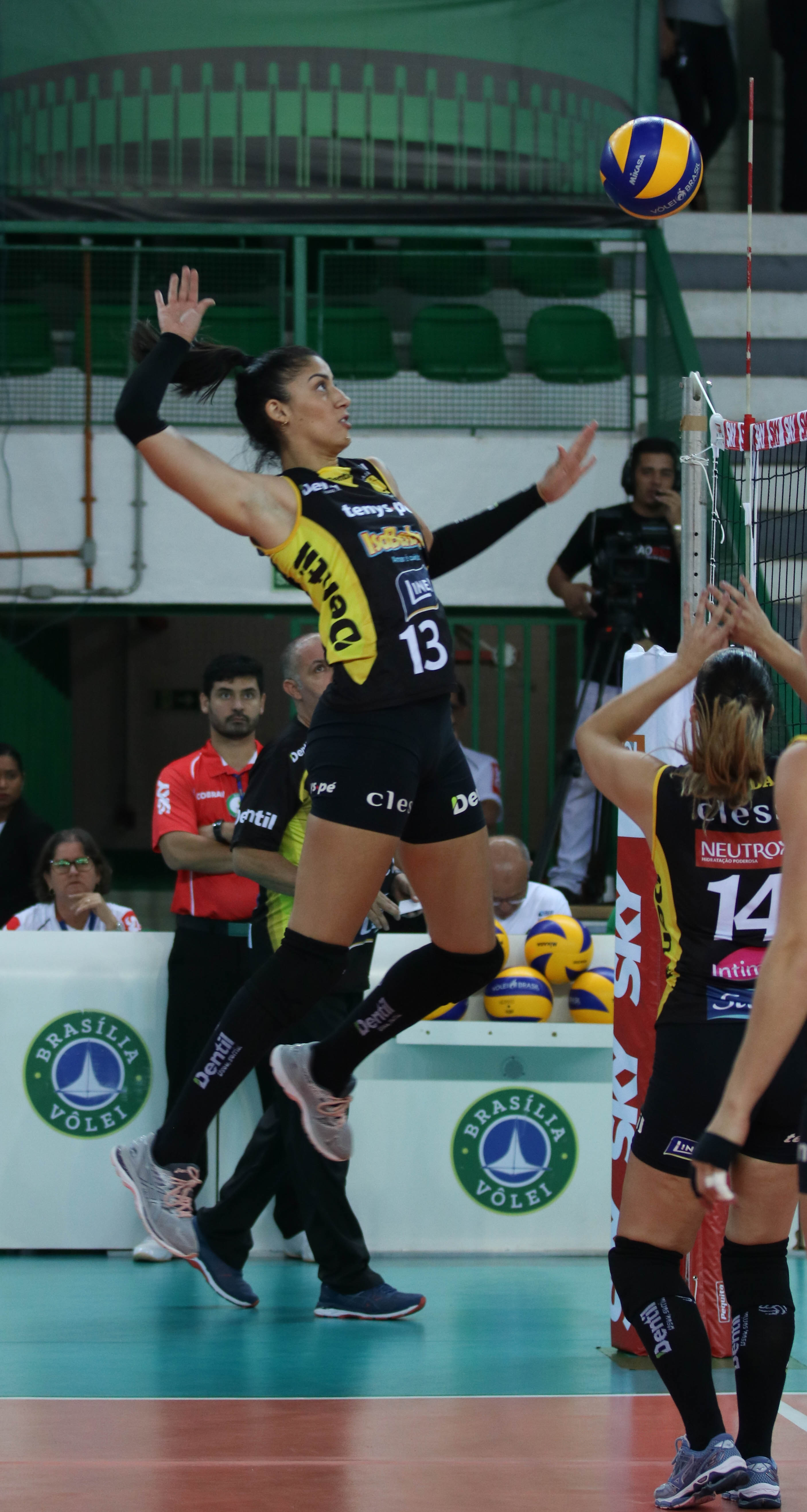

Personal information
- Nationality: Brazilian
- Born: July 16, 1993 (age 33); Maringá
- Height: 1.90 cm (1 in)
- Weight: 77 kg (170 lb)

Volleyball information
- Position: Middle blocker
- Current club: (Brazil) Praia Clube
- Number: 13

Career
Years	Teams
2009-2010; 2010-2011; 2011-2012; 2012-2014; 2014-2015; 2015-2016; 2016-2017; 2017-2018; 2018-	(Brazil) Clube Desportivo Macaé Sports (Brazil) Minas Tênis Clube (Brazil) Esporte Clube Pinheiros (Brazil) Sesi São Paulo (Brazil) Esporte Clube Pinheiros (Brazil) Associação Rio do Sul Vôlei (Brazil) Minas Tênis Clube (Brazil) Hinode Barueri (Brazil) Praia Clube

Francynne Jacintho (born July 16, 1993) is a Brazilian volleyball player, a member of the club Praia Clube.

== Sporting achievements ==
=== Clubs ===
South American Club Championship:

- 2014
- 2019

Brazilian Championship:

- 2014, 2019

Brazilian Cup:

- 2015

Brazilian SuperCup:

- 2018, 2019

=== National team ===
Youth South American Championship:

- 2008

U18 World Championship:

- 2009

Junior South American Championship:

- 2010

U20 World Championship:

- 2011

=== Individual ===
- 2010: The Best Blocker Junior South American Championship
