= 2016 Girls' Youth South American Volleyball Championship =

Tournament details
- Host country: Peru
- Dates: 24–28 August 2016
- Teams: 8
- Venue: 1

Final positions
- Champions: Brazil (16th title)

Tournament awards
- MVP: Tainara Santos (BRA)

The 2016 Girls' Youth South American Volleyball Championship was the 20th edition of the Girls' Youth South American Volleyball Championship, organised by South America's governing volleyball body, the Confederación Sudamericana de Voleibol (CSV).

== Competing nations ==
The following national teams participated:

- Argentina
- Bolivia
- Brazil
- Chile
- Colombia
- Peru
- Uruguay
- Venezuela

== Preliminary round ==
=== Pool A ===
Pos	Team	Pld	W	L	Pts	SW	SL	SR	SPW	SPL	SPR	Qualification
1	Brazil	3	3	0	9	9	1	9.000	246	146	1.685	Semifinals
2	Colombia	3	2	1	5	7	5	1.400	260	254	1.024	Semifinals
3	Chile	3	1	2	4	5	6	0.833	208	234	0.889	5th–8th place classification
4	Bolivia	3	0	3	0	0	9	0.000	145	225	0.644	5th–8th place classification

Date	Time		Score		Set 1	Set 2	Set 3	Set 4	Set 5	Total	Report
24 Aug	10:30	Colombia	3–2	Chile	25–17	19–25	21–25	25–21	15–10	105–98	Result
24 Aug	15:00	Brazil	3–0	Bolivia	25–7	25–12	25–12			75–31	Result
25 Aug	10:30	Bolivia	0–3	Colombia	16–25	21–25	23–25			60–75	Result
25 Aug	15:00	Chile	0–3	Brazil	12–25	14–25	9–25			35–75	Result
26 Aug	10:30	Chile	3–0	Bolivia	25–14	25–23	25–17			75–54	Result
26 Aug	15:00	Brazil	3–1	Colombia	25–15	21–25	25–22	25–18		96–80	Result

=== Pool B ===
Pos	Team	Pld	W	L	Pts	SW	SL	SR	SPW	SPL	SPR	Qualification
1	Peru	3	3	0	9	9	0	MAX	225	133	1.692	Semifinals
2	Argentina	3	2	1	6	6	3	2.000	202	146	1.384	Semifinals
3	Uruguay	3	1	2	3	3	7	0.429	179	232	0.772	5th–8th place classification
4	Venezuela	3	0	3	0	1	9	0.111	149	244	0.611	5th–8th place classification

Date	Time		Score		Set 1	Set 2	Set 3	Set 4	Set 5	Total	Report
24 Aug	12:45	Argentina	3–0	Uruguay	25–13	25–14	25–18			75–45	Result
24 Aug	17:05	Peru	3–0	Venezuela	25–16	25–12	25–13			75–41	Result
25 Aug	12:45	Venezuela	0–3	Argentina	5–25	7–25	14–25			26–75	Result
25 Aug	17:05	Uruguay	0–3	Peru	15–25	12–25	13–25			40–75	Result
26 Aug	12:45	Uruguay	3–1	Venezuela	25–7	15–25	27–25	27–25		94–82	Result
26 Aug	17:05	Peru	3–0	Argentina	25–19	25–12	25–21			75–52	Result

== Final round ==
=== 5th–8th classification ===
5th–8th Semifinals
27 August
Chile	3
Venezuela	1
27 August
Bolivia	3
Uruguay	0

Fifth place
28 August
Chile	3
Bolivia	0
Seven place
28 August
Venezuela	0
Uruguay	3

==== 5th–8th semifinals ====
Date	Time		Score		Set 1	Set 2	Set 3	Set 4	Set 5	Total	Report
27 Aug	11:30	Chile	3–1	Venezuela	25–16	25–17	17–25	25–16		92–74	Result
27 Aug	13:30	Bolivia	3–0	Uruguay	25–23	25–15	25–21			75–59	Result

==== Seventh place match ====
Date	Time		Score		Set 1	Set 2	Set 3	Set 4	Set 5	Total	Report
28 Aug	12:30	Venezuela	0–3	Uruguay	16–25	17–25	9–25			42–75	Result

==== Fifth place match ====
Date	Time		Score		Set 1	Set 2	Set 3	Set 4	Set 5	Total	Report
28 Aug	14:30	Chile	3–0	Bolivia	25–17	25–20	25–16			75–53	Result

=== Championship ===
Semifinals
27 August
Brazil	3
Argentina	0
27 August
Peru	3
Colombia	1

Final
28 August
Brazil	3
Peru	0
Third place
28 August
Argentina	3
Colombia	1

==== Semifinals ====
Date	Time		Score		Set 1	Set 2	Set 3	Set 4	Set 5	Total	Report
27 Aug	15:45	Brazil	3–0	Argentina	25–18	25–16	25–18			75–52	Result
27 Aug	18:05	Peru	3–1	Colombia	25–21	22–25	25–18	25–20		97–84	Result

==== Third place match ====
Date	Time		Score		Set 1	Set 2	Set 3	Set 4	Set 5	Total	Report
28 Aug	16:45	Argentina	3–1	Colombia	27–25	23–25	25–14	25–14		100–78	Result

==== Final ====
Date	Time		Score		Set 1	Set 2	Set 3	Set 4	Set 5	Total	Report
28 Aug	19:05	Brazil	3–0	Peru	25–16	25–16	25–22			75–54	Result

== Final standing ==
Rank	Team
1st place, gold medalist(s)	Brazil
2nd place, silver medalist(s)	Peru
3rd place, bronze medalist(s)	Argentina
4	Colombia
5	Chile
6	Bolivia
7	Uruguay
8	Venezuela

Qualified for the 2017 Youth World Championship

== All-Star Team ==
- Most valuable player
  - Tainara Santos (BRA)
- Best Outside Hitters
  - Kiara Montes (PER)
  - Mariana Brambilla (BRA)
- Best setter
  - Nayeli Vilchez (PER)
- Best Middle Blockers
  - Daniela Seibt (BRA)
  - Flavia Montes (PER)
- Best Opposite
  - Mayara Silva (BRA)
- Best libero
  - Valeria Takeda (PER)
