= 2024 Girls' U19 South American Volleyball Championship =

Tournament details
- Host country: Brazil
- City: Araguari
- Dates: 28 August – 1 September 2024
- Teams: 7
- Venue: 1 (in 1 host city)

Final positions
- Champions: Brazil (17th title)
- Runners-up: Argentina
- Third place: Peru
- Fourth place: Chile

Tournament awards
- MVP: (Brazil) Mikaela Hestmann
- Best Setter: (Brazil) Luanna Markus
- Best OH: (Brazil) Mikaela Hestmann (Argentina) Julia Allub
- Best MB: (Brazil) Lara Gabriele (Peru) Fátima Villafuerte
- Best OPP: (Argentina) Paula Tomasa
- Best Libero: (Chile) Martina Pérez

Tournament statistics
- Matches played: 14

The 2024 Girls' U19 South American Volleyball Championship was the 23rd edition of the Girls' U19 South American Volleyball Championship, a biennial international youth volleyball tournament organised by the Confederación Sudamericana de Voleibol (CSV) for the girls' under-19 national teams of South America. It was held in Araguari, Brazil from 28 August to 1 September 2024.

Same as previous editions, the tournament acted as the CSV qualifiers for the FIVB Volleyball Girls' U19 World Championship. The top three teams qualified for the 2025 FIVB Volleyball Girls' U19 World Championship as the CSV representatives.

Brazil won their 17th title by beating the two-time defending champions Argentina 3–0 in the final. Peru completed the podium after defeating Chile in the third-place match. Champions Brazil, runners-up Argentina and third-place Peru qualified for the 2025 FIVB Volleyball Girls' U19 World Championship.

== Host and venue ==
Araguari	Location of the host city in the Federative Unit of Minas Gerais
Ginásio Poliesportivo General Mário Brum Negreiros	Location of the host city in the Federative Unit of Minas Gerais
Capacity: 2,200	Location of the host city in the Federative Unit of Minas Gerais

Araguari, Brazil was confirmed as host city of the tournament during the 76th CSV Annual Congress held on 13 July 2024 in Belo Horizonte, Brazil. This was the fourth time that Brazil hosted the tournament having previously done so in 1980, 2008 and the previous 2022 edition.

The competition was entirely played at the Ginásio Poliesportivo General Mário Brum Negreiros.

== Teams ==
Seven of the twelve CSV member associations entered the tournament.

Team	App	Previous best performance
Argentina (holders)	22nd	Champions (1996, 2018, 2022)
Brazil (hosts)	23rd	Champions (16 times, most recent 2016)
Chile	22nd	Third place (2022)
Colombia	10th	Fourth place (1986, 1996, 2014, 2016, 2018)
Paraguay	9th	Fourth place (1978, 1982)
Peru	23rd	Champions (1978, 1980, 2012)
Venezuela	18th	Third place (1994, 2002, 2004, 2008)

=== Squads ===
Each national team had to register a squad of a minimum of 12 and a maximum of 14 players players. Players born on or after 1 January 2007 were eligible to compete in the tournament.

== Competition format ==
The competition format depends on the number of participating teams. With 7 teams two groups were formed, one of three teams and the other of four, which were played on a single round-robin basis. The group standing procedure was as follows:

1. Number of matches won;
2. Match points;
  - Match won 3–0: 3 match points for the winner, 0 match points for the loser
  - Match won 3–1: 3 match points for the winner, 0 match point for the loser
  - Match won 3–2: 2 match points for the winner, 1 match points for the loser
3. Sets ratio;
4. Points ratio;
5. If the tie continues between two teams: result of the last match between the tied teams;
6. If the tie continues between three or more teams: a new classification would be made taking into consideration only the matches between involved teams.

== Classification phase ==
All match times are local times, BRT (UTC-3).

=== Group A ===
Pos	Team	Pld	W	L	Pts	SW	SL	SR	SPW	SPL	SPR	Qualification
1	Brazil (H)	2	2	0	6	6	0	MAX	150	86	1.744	Semi-finals
2	Peru	2	1	1	3	3	3	1.000	127	124	1.024	Semi-finals
3	Venezuela	2	0	2	0	0	6	0.000	83	150	0.553	Fifth-place match

Rules for classification: Tiebreakers
(H) Host

Date	Time		Score		Set 1	Set 2	Set 3	Set 4	Set 5	Total	Report
28 Aug	17:30	Brazil	3–0	Venezuela	25–10	25–11	25–13			75–34	P2 Report
29 Aug	15:00	Brazil	3–0	Peru	25–13	25–22	25–17			75–52	P2 Report
30 Aug	20:00	Peru	3–0	Venezuela	25–13	25–19	25–17			75–49	P2 Report

=== Group B ===
Pos	Team	Pld	W	L	Pts	SW	SL	SR	SPW	SPL	SPR	Qualification
1	Argentina	3	3	0	9	9	1	9.000	247	188	1.314	Semi-finals
2	Chile	3	2	1	5	6	5	1.200	229	221	1.036	Semi-finals
3	Colombia	3	1	2	4	6	6	1.000	254	258	0.984	Fifth-place match
4	Paraguay	3	0	3	0	0	9	0.000	162	225	0.720	

Rules for classification: Tiebreakers

Date	Time		Score		Set 1	Set 2	Set 3	Set 4	Set 5	Total	Report
28 Aug	15:00	Argentina	3–0	Paraguay	25–15	25–20	25–19			75–54	P2 Report
28 Aug	20:00	Chile	3–2	Colombia	20–25	26–24	18–25	25–12	15–9	104–95	P2 Report
29 Aug	17:30	Argentina	3–1	Colombia	22–25	25–17	25–19	25–23		97–84	P2 Report
29 Aug	20:00	Chile	3–0	Paraguay	25–17	25–19	25–15			75–51	P2 Report
30 Aug	15:00	Argentina	3–0	Chile	25–14	25–19	25–17			75–50	P2 Report
30 Aug	17:30	Paraguay	0–3	Colombia	22–25	14–25	21–25			57–75	P2 Report

== Final phase ==
=== Bracket ===
Semi-finals
31 August
Argentina	3
Peru	1
31 August
Brazil	3
Chile	0

Final
1 September
Argentina	0
Brazil	3

Fifth-place match
31 August
Venezuela	0
Colombia	3

Third-place match
1 September
Peru	3
Chile	0

=== Semi-finals ===
Date	Time		Score		Set 1	Set 2	Set 3	Set 4	Set 5	Total	Report
31 Aug	15:30	Argentina	3–1	Peru	25–21	25–18	23–25	25–15		98–79	P2 Report
31 Aug	18:00	Brazil	3–0	Chile	25–17	25–19	25–19			75–55	P2 Report

=== 5th place match ===
Date	Time		Score		Set 1	Set 2	Set 3	Set 4	Set 5	Total	Report
31 Aug	13:00	Venezuela	0–3	Colombia	14–25	17–25	18–25			49–75	P2 Report

=== 3rd place match ===
Date	Time		Score		Set 1	Set 2	Set 3	Set 4	Set 5	Total	Report
1 Sep	14:30	Peru	3–0	Chile	25–22	25–19	25–18			75–59	P2 Report

=== Final ===
Date	Time		Score		Set 1	Set 2	Set 3	Set 4	Set 5	Total	Report
1 Sep	17:00	Argentina	0–3	Brazil	18–25	20–25	15–25			53–75	P2 Report

== Final standing ==
Qualified for 2025 FIVB Girls' U19 World Championship.

Rank	Team
1st place, gold medalist(s)	Brazil
2nd place, silver medalist(s)	Argentina
3rd place, bronze medalist(s)	Peru
4	Chile
5	Colombia
6	Venezuela
7	Paraguay

2024 Girls' U19 South American Championship champions

Brazil
Seventeenth title

Team Roster:

Luanna Markus, Giovanna Micaelli, Júlia Fernandes (L), Giovana Pires, Mikaela Hestmann (C), Lorena Rezende, Nayla Letícia, Maria Júlia Hildebrand, Sophia Bom, Alyce Vasconcelos (L), Lara Gabriele, Luize Tavares, Isabela Vieira, Morgana Uberbacker,

Head coach: (Brazil) Guilherme Schmitz

== Individual awards ==
The following individual awards were presented at the end of the tournament.

- Most valuable player (MVP)

Mikaela Hestmann (BRA)

- Best middle blockers

Lara Gabriele (BRA)
Fátima Villafuerte (PER)

- Best setter

Luanna Markus (BRA)

- Best opposite spiker

Paula Tomasa (ARG)

- Best outside spikers

Mikaela Hestmann (BRA)
Julia Allub (ARG)

- Best libero

Martina Pérez (CHI)

== See also ==
- 2024 Boys' U19 South American Volleyball Championship
