= 2010 Girls' Youth South American Volleyball Championship =

Tournament details
- Host country: Peru
- Dates: 24 – 29 August
- Teams: 8
- Venues: 3 (in Callao, Tarapoto and Tacna host cities)

Final positions
- Champions: Brazil (14th title)

Tournament awards
- MVP: Gabriela Guimarães (BRA)

The 2010 Girls' Youth South American Volleyball Championship was the 17th edition of the tournament, organised by South America's governing volleyball body, the Confederación Sudamericana de Voleibol (CSV). Held in Tacna, Tarapoto and Callao in Peru. The top two teams qualified for the 2011 Youth World Championship.

== Competing nations ==
The following national teams participated in the tournament, teams were seeded according to how they finished in the previous edition of the tournament with host Peru being seeded first:

Pool A	Pool B
Brazil (1st); Argentina (4th); Colombia (5th); Bolivia	Peru (Host & 2nd); Venezuela (3rd); Chile (7th); Paraguay (8th)

== First round ==
=== Pool A ===
- Venue: Coliseo Cerrado de Tacna, Tacna, Peru

Pos	Team	Pld	W	L	Pts	SW	SL	SR	SPW	SPL	SPR	Qualification
1	Peru	3	3	0	6	9	0	MAX	225	142	1.585	Semifinals
2	Chile	3	2	1	5	6	4	1.500	238	199	1.196	Semifinals
3	Venezuela	3	1	2	4	4	6	0.667	219	218	1.005	
4	Paraguay	3	0	3	3	0	9	0.000	102	225	0.453	

Date		Score		Set 1	Set 2	Set 3	Set 4	Set 5	Total
24 Aug	Paraguay	0–3	Venezuela	11–25	13–25	15–25			39–75
24 Aug	Peru	3–0	Chile	25–20	25–17	25–22			75–59
25 Aug	Venezuela	1–3	Chile	14–25	20–25	31–29	22–25		87–104
25 Aug	Peru	3–0	Paraguay	25–10	25–6	25–10			75–26
26 Aug	Chile	3–0	Paraguay	25–13	25–12	25–12			75–37
26 Aug	Peru	3–0	Venezuela	25–22	25–14	25–21			75–57

=== Pool B ===
- Venue: Coliseo Cerrado de Tarapoto, Tarapoto, Peru

Pos	Team	Pld	W	L	Pts	SW	SL	SR	SPW	SPL	SPR	Qualification
1	Brazil	3	3	0	6	9	2	4.500	262	184	1.424	Semifinals
2	Argentina	3	2	1	5	8	4	2.000	275	223	1.233	Semifinals
3	Colombia	3	1	2	4	4	6	0.667	204	222	0.919	
4	Bolivia	3	0	3	3	0	9	0.000	113	225	0.502	

Date		Score		Set 1	Set 2	Set 3	Set 4	Set 5	Total
24 Aug	Brazil	3–0	Bolivia	25–21	25–10	25–6			75–37
24 Aug	Argentina	3–1	Colombia	22–25	25–20	28–26	25–11		100–82
25 Aug	Argentina	3–0	Bolivia	25–14	25–15	25–3			75–32
25 Aug	Brazil	3–0	Colombia	25–12	25–9	28–26			78–47
26 Aug	Colombia	3–0	Bolivia	25–14	25–15	25–15			75–44
26 Aug	Brazil	3–2	Argentina	20–25	25–18	25–18	24–26	15–13	109–100

== Final round ==
- Venue: Coliseo Miguel Grau, Callao, Peru

=== 5th to 8th places bracket ===
5th to 8th Classification
2012-08-28 – Callao
Colombia	3
Paraguay	0
2012-08-28 – Callao
Venezuela	3
Bolivia	0

5th place match
2012-08-29 – Callao
Colombia	3
Venezuela	0
7th place match
2012-08-29 – Callao
Paraguay	1
Bolivia	3

=== Championship bracket ===
Semifinal
2012-08-28 – Callao
Peru	2
Argentina	3
2012-08-28 – Callao
Brazil	3
Chile	0

1st place match
2012-08-29 – Callao
Argentina	0
Brazil	3
3rd place match
2012-08-29 – Callao
Peru	3
Chile	1

=== 5th to 8th classification ===
Date		Score		Set 1	Set 2	Set 3	Set 4	Set 5	Total
28 Aug	Venezuela	3–0	Bolivia	25–14	25–8	25–15			75–37
28 Aug	Colombia	3–0	Paraguay	25–5	25–13	25–5			75–23

=== Semifinals ===
Date		Score		Set 1	Set 2	Set 3	Set 4	Set 5	Total
28 Aug	Brazil	3–0	Chile	25–14	25–9	25–11			75–34
28 Aug	Peru	2–3	Argentina	25–18	25–23	10–25	19–25	11–15	90–106

=== 7th place match ===
Date		Score		Set 1	Set 2	Set 3	Set 4	Set 5	Total
29 Aug	Paraguay	1–3	Bolivia	7-25	25-21	14-25	19-25		65-96

=== 5th place match ===
Date		Score		Set 1	Set 2	Set 3	Set 4	Set 5	Total
29 Aug	Colombia	3–0	Venezuela	25–18	25–21	25–20			75–59

=== 3rd place match ===
Date		Score		Set 1	Set 2	Set 3	Set 4	Set 5	Total
29 Aug	Peru	3–1	Chile	16–25	25–22	25–14	25–9		91–70

=== Final ===
Date		Score		Set 1	Set 2	Set 3	Set 4	Set 5	Total
29 Aug	Argentina	0–3	Brazil	24–26	20–25	18–25			62–76

== Final standing ==
Rank	Team
1st place, gold medalist(s)	Brazil
2nd place, silver medalist(s)	Argentina
3rd place, bronze medalist(s)	Peru
4	Chile
5	Colombia
6	Venezuela
7	Bolivia
8	Paraguay

Qualified for the 2011 Youth World Championship

2010 Girls' Youth South American Volleyball Championship

Brazil
14th title

== Individual awards ==
- Most valuable player
  - Gabriela Guimarães (BRA)
- Best spiker
  - Gabriela Guimarães (BRA)
- Best blocker
  - Natalia Cendan (ARG)
- Best server
  - Carla Reginatto (BRA)
- Best digger
  - Micaela Spahn (ARG)
- Best setter
  - Naiane Rios (BRA)
- Best receiver
  - Juliana Paes (BRA)
- Best libero
  - Juliana Paes (BRA)
