= Candela Sol Salinas =

Argentine volleyball player (born 2000)

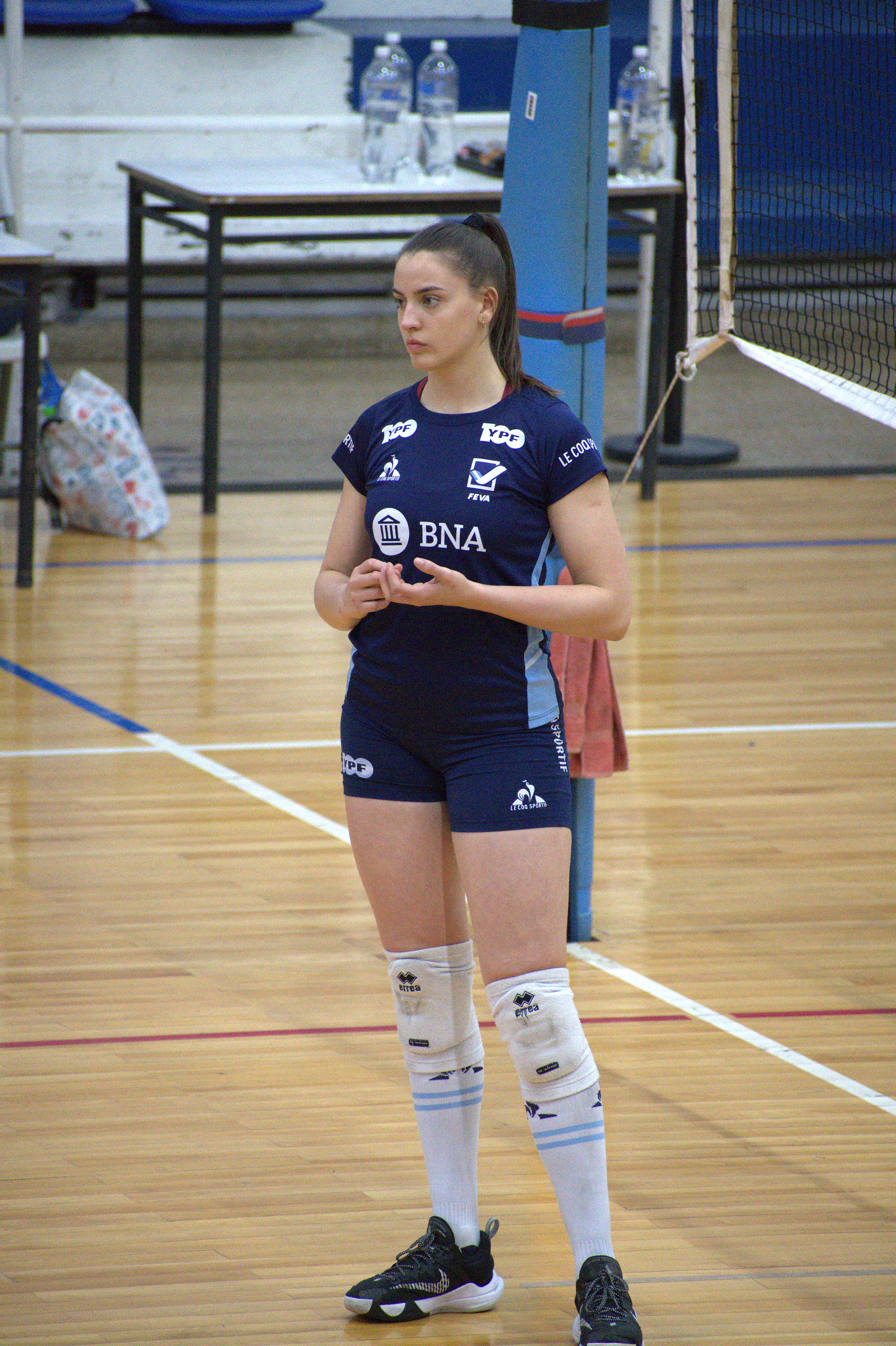

Personal information
- Full name: Candela Sol Salinas
- Nationality: Argentine
- Born: 23 May 2000 (age 26); Buenos Aires
- Hometown: Avellaneda
- Height: 180 cm (71 in)
- Weight: 70 kg (154 lb)
- Spike: 300 cm (118 in)
- Block: 265 cm (104 in)
- Education: Jose Manuel Estrada

Volleyball information
- Position: Punta
- Current club: Boca Juniors
- Number: 5 (national team)

Career
Years	Teams
2018	Boca Juniors

National team
2014	Argentina

Candela Sol Salinas (born 23 May 2000) is an Argentine female volleyball player. She is part of the Argentina women's national volleyball team.

She participated in the 2017 FIVB Volleyball Girls' U18 World Championship and FIVB Girls U20 Championship, and 2018 FIVB Volleyball Women's Nations League At club level she played for Boca Juniors in 2018 and 2019.

== International career ==
Candela Sol Salinas left Boca Juniors in 2020 to join Green Warriors Sassuolo, which is a Volleyball team located in Sassuolo Italy. The team currently plays in the Serie A2 Femminile which is the second division of women's volleyball in Italy.
