= Mariana Brambilla =

Brazilian volleyball player

Personal information
- Nationality: Brazil
- Born: 19 March 2000 (age 26); Porto Alegre, Brazil
- Height: 1.84 m (6 ft 0 in)
- Weight: 60 kg (130 lb)
- Spike: 293 cm (115 in)
- Block: 284 cm (112 in)

Volleyball information
- Position: Outside hitter/Opposite

Career
Years	Teams
2015–2016; 2016–2017; 2018–2022; 2022; 2022–	(Brazil) Sogipa (Brazil) Abel/Moda Brusque (United States) Georgia Tech Yellow Jackets (Greece) Panathinaikos (France) Pays d'Aix Venelles

National team
2017	Brazil U18
Honours
World University Games
Bronze medal – third place	2025 Rhine-Ruhr	Team
- Last updated: 30 July 2025

Mariana Brambilla (born 19 March 2000, in Porto Alegre, Brazil), is a female professional volleyball player, playing as an opposite.

== Professional career ==
On 16 January 2022, she signed with Greek powerhouse Panathinaikos. On 27 May 2022, she was announced by the French team Pays d'Aix Venelles Volley-Ball.

== National team ==
She competed for the Brazil women's national under-18 volleyball team at the 2017 FIVB Volleyball Girls' U18 World Championship.

== Titles ==
=== National championships ===
- 2021–22 Greek Championship, with Panathinaikos

=== National cups ===
- 2021–22 Greek Cup, with Panathinaikos
