= Oliwia Bałuk =

Polish volleyball player (born 2000)

Personal information
- Nationality: Polish
- Born: 17 May 2000 (age 26)
- Height: 175 cm (69 in)
- Weight: 62 kg (137 lb)
- Spike: 280 cm (110 in)
- Block: 279 cm (110 in)

Volleyball information
- Position: Wing spiker
- Number: 18 (national team)

Career
Years	Teams
2017-	KPS Chemik Police

National team
2017-	Poland

Oliwia Bałuk (born 17 May 2000) is a Polish volleyball player. She is part of the Poland women's national volleyball team.

She participated in the 2017 Girls' U18 Volleyball European Championship, 2017 FIVB Volleyball Women's U20 World Championship, and 2018 FIVB Volleyball Women's Nations League. On club level she played for KPS Chemik Police.
