= Girls' Youth South American Volleyball Championship =

- Current season, competition or edition: 2026 Girls' U19 South American Volleyball Championship
- Sport: Volleyball
- Founded: 1978
- Continent: South America (CSV)
- Most recent champion: Argentina (4th title)
- Most titles: Brazil (17 titles)

The Girls' Youth South American Volleyball Championship is a sport competition for national women's volleyball teams with players under 19 years, currently held biannually and organized by the Confederación Sudamericana de Voleibol (CSV), the South American volleyball federation.

== Results summary ==
Year	Host	Final			3rd place match			Teams
Year	Host	Champions	Score	Runners-up	3rd place	Score	4th place	Teams
1978; Details	(Argentina); Buenos Aires	Peru	Round-robin	Brazil	Argentina	Round-robin	Paraguay	7
1980; Details	(Brazil); São Paulo	Peru	Round-robin	Brazil	Argentina	Round-robin	Chile	6
1982; Details	(Paraguay); Asunción	Brazil	Round-robin	Peru	Argentina	Round-robin	Paraguay	5
1984; Details	(Chile); Santiago	Brazil	Round-robin	Peru	Argentina	Round-robin	Chile	4
1986; Details	(Peru); Lima	Brazil	Round-robin	Peru	Argentina	Round-robin	Colombia	6
1988; Details	(Argentina); Resistencia	Brazil	Round-robin	Peru	Argentina	Round-robin	Uruguay	6
1990; Details	(Bolivia); La Paz	Brazil	Round-robin	Argentina	Peru	Round-robin	Venezuela	7
1992; Details	(Venezuela); Valencia	Brazil	Round-robin	Argentina	Peru	Round-robin	Venezuela	6
1994; Details	(Peru); Trujillo	Brazil	Round-robin	Peru	Venezuela	Round-robin	Chile	5
1996; Details	(Uruguay); Paysandú	Argentina	Round-robin	Brazil	Peru	Round-robin	Colombia	6
1998; Details	(Bolivia); Sucre	Brazil	Round-robin	Argentina	Peru	Round-robin	Venezuela	6
2000; Details	(Venezuela); Valencia	Brazil	Round-robin	Argentina	Peru	Round-robin	Venezuela	6
2002; Details	(Venezuela); Barquisimeto	Brazil	Round-robin	Argentina	Venezuela	Round-robin	Peru	6
2004; Details	(Ecuador); Guayaquil	Brazil	3–1	Argentina	Venezuela	3–1	Peru	8
2006; Details	(Peru); Lima / Lurigancho-Chosica	Brazil	3–0	Peru	Argentina	3–2	Venezuela	8
2008; Details	(Peru); Lima / Pucallpa	Brazil	3–1	Peru	Venezuela	3–1	Argentina	8
2010; Details	(Peru); Callao / Tacna / Tarapoto	Brazil	3–0	Argentina	Peru	3–1	Chile	8
2012; Details	(Peru); Callao	Peru	3–2	Brazil	Argentina	3–0	Chile	8
2014; Details	(Peru); Tarapoto	Brazil	Round-robin	Argentina	Peru	Round-robin	Colombia	6
2016; Details	(Peru); Lima	Brazil	3–0	Peru	Argentina	3–1	Colombia	8
2018; Details	(Colombia); Valledupar	Argentina	3–1	Peru	Brazil	3–0	Colombia	8
2022; Details	(Bolivia); La Paz	Argentina	Round-robin	Brazil	Chile	Round-robin	Peru	6
2024; Details	(Brazil); Araguari	Brazil	3–0	Argentina	Peru	3–0	Chile	7
2026; Details	(Venezuela); Maracaibo	Argentina	3–0	Peru	Brazil	3–1	Venezuela	8

== Medal table ==
Rank	Nation	Gold	Silver	Bronze	Total
1	Brazil	17	5	2	24
2	Argentina	4	9	9	22
3	Peru	3	10	8	21
4	Venezuela	0	0	4	4
5	Chile	0	0	1	1
Totals (5 entries)		24	24	24	72

== Most valuable player by edition ==
- 1978 – 2000 – Unknown
- 2002 – Adenízia da Silva (BRA)
- 2004 – Natália Pereira (BRA)
- 2006 – Leticia Raimundi (BRA)
- 2008 – Sthéfanie Paulino (BRA)
- 2010 – Gabriela Guimarães (BRA)
- 2012 – Ángela Leyva (PER)
- 2014 – Beatriz Carvalho (BRA)
- 2016 – Tainara Santos (BRA)
- 2018 – Bianca Cugno (ARG)
- 2022 – Milena Margaria (ARG)
- 2024 – Mikaela Hestmann (BRA)
- 2026 – Sofía Baldo (ARG)

== See also ==
- Boys' Youth South American Volleyball Championship
- Women's U22 South American Volleyball Championship
- Women's Junior South American Volleyball Championship
- Girls' U16 South American Volleyball Championship
