= 2014 Girls' Youth South American Volleyball Championship =

Tournament details
- Host country: Peru
- Dates: 2 – 6 July 2014
- Teams: 6
- Venue: 1 (in Tarapoto host cities)

Final positions
- Champions: Brazil (15th title)

Tournament awards
- MVP: Beatriz Carvalho (BRA)

The 2014 Girls' Youth South American Volleyball Championship was the 19th edition of the tournament, organised by South America's governing volleyball body, the Confederación Sudamericana de Voleibol (CSV).

Brazil girls won their 15th title in the Championship. The top three teams; Brazil, Argentina and Peru, qualified to the 2015 Youth World Championship.

== Competing nations ==
Pool A

Argentina
Brazil
Chile
Colombia
Peru
Uruguay
~~Venezuela~~ (withdrew)

== Competition format ==
The 2014 Girls' Youth South American Volleyball Championship consisted of a single round-robin pool between the six teams, the champion was determined from the ranking after the round.

== Competition ==
- Venue: Coliseo Bicentenario de Morales, Tarapoto, Peru
- All times are Peruvian Standard Time (UTC−05:00)

Pos	Team	Pld	W	L	Pts	SW	SL	SR	SPW	SPL	SPR
1	Brazil	5	5	0	15	15	2	7.500	414	319	1.298
2	Argentina	5	4	1	11	13	6	2.167	431	327	1.318
3	Peru	5	3	2	9	9	7	1.286	343	338	1.015
4	Colombia	5	2	3	6	8	11	0.727	386	407	0.948
5	Chile	5	1	4	4	8	12	0.667	406	440	0.923
6	Uruguay	5	0	5	0	0	15	0.000	226	375	0.603

Date	Time		Score		Set 1	Set 2	Set 3	Set 4	Set 5	Total
2 July	14:00	Argentina	3–1	Chile	25–23	25–16	22–25	25–13		97–77
2 July	16:30	Brazil	3–0	Colombia	25–16	25–23	25–23			75–62
2 July	19:00	Peru	3–0	Uruguay	25–20	25–11	25–8			75–39
3 July	14:00	Brazil	3–1	Chile	25–16	25–20	21–25	25–10		96–71
3 July	16:30	Argentina	3–0	Uruguay	25–10	25–10	25–16			75–36
3 July	19:00	Peru	3–0	Colombia	25–20	25–22	25–23			75–65
4 July	14:00	Colombia	3–0	Uruguay	25–15	25–13	25–21			75–49
4 July	16:30	Brazil	3–1	Argentina	25–15	25–15	18–25	25–20		93–75
4 July	19:00	Peru	3–1	Chile	27–25	17–25	25–18	25–16		94–84
5 July	13:00	Colombia	3–2	Chile	25–17	15–25	25–19	23–25	15–13	103–99
5 July	15:30	Brazil	3–0	Uruguay	25–18	25–21	25–13			75–52
5 July	18:00	Peru	0–3	Argentina	10–25	13–25	17–25			40–75
6 July	13:00	Chile	3–0	Uruguay	25–15	25–14	25–21			75–50
6 July	15:30	Argentina	3–2	Colombia	22–25	22–25	25–12	25–14	15–5	109–81
6 July	18:00	Peru	0–3	Brazil	17–25	20–25	22–25			59–75

== Final standing ==
Rank	Team
1st place, gold medalist(s)	Brazil
2nd place, silver medalist(s)	Argentina
3rd place, bronze medalist(s)	Peru
4	Colombia
5	Chile
6	Uruguay

Qualified for the 2015 Youth World Championship

2014 Girls' Youth South American Volleyball Championship

Brazil
15th title

== All-Star Team ==
- Most valuable player
  - Beatriz Carvalho (BRA)
- Best Opposite
  - Katherine Regalado (PER)
- Best Outside Hitters
  - Adriana Durán (COL)
  - Anahí Tosi (ARG)
- Best Middle Blockers
  - Candelaria Herrera (ARG)
  - María Paula Caraballo (COL)
- Best setter
  - Amanda Sehn (BRA)
- Best libero
  - Valentina González (ARG)
