= 2008 Girls' Youth South American Volleyball Championship =

Tournament details
- Host country: Peru
- Dates: 1 – 6 September
- Teams: 8
- Venues: 3 (in Lima and Pucallpa host cities)

Final positions
- Champions: Brazil (13th title)

Tournament awards
- MVP: Sthéfanie Paulino (BRA)

The 2008 Girls' Youth South American Volleyball Championship was the 16th edition of the tournament, organised by South America's governing volleyball body, the Confederación Sudamericana de Voleibol (CSV). Held in Lima and Pucallpa in Peru. The top two teams qualified for the 2009 Youth World Championship.

== Competing nations ==
The following national teams participated in the tournament, teams were seeded according to how they finished in the previous edition of the tournament with host Peru being seeded first:

Pool A	Pool B
Brazil (1st); Venezuela (4th); Chile (5th); Colombia	Peru (Host & 2nd); Argentina (3rd); Uruguay (6th); Paraguay (8th)

== First round ==
=== Pool A ===
- Venue: Coliseo Cerrado de Pucallpa, Pucallpa, Peru

Pos	Team	Pld	W	L	Pts	SW	SL	SR	SPW	SPL	SPR	Qualification
1	Brazil	3	3	0	6	9	0	MAX	225	103	2.184	Semifinals
2	Venezuela	3	2	1	5	6	6	1.000	233	246	0.947	Semifinals
3	Colombia	3	1	2	4	5	7	0.714	237	264	0.898	
4	Chile	3	0	3	3	2	9	0.222	183	265	0.691	

Date		Score		Set 1	Set 2	Set 3	Set 4	Set 5	Total
1 Sep	Venezuela	3–1	Chile	25–16	22–25	25–12	25–16		97–69
1 Sep	Brazil	3–0	Colombia	25–12	25–20	25–10			75–42
2 Sep	Venezuela	3–2	Colombia	23–25	14–25	25–19	25–23	15–10	102–102
2 Sep	Brazil	3–0	Chile	25–4	25–11	25–12			75–27
3 Sep	Chile	1–3	Colombia	12–25	25–18	20–25	20–25		87–93
3 Sep	Brazil	3–0	Venezuela	25–9	25–15	25–10			75–34

=== Pool B ===
- Venue: Coliseo Eduardo Dibos, Lima, Peru

Pos	Team	Pld	W	L	Pts	SW	SL	SR	SPW	SPL	SPR	Qualification
1	Peru	3	3	0	6	9	0	MAX	225	128	1.758	Semifinals
2	Argentina	3	2	1	5	6	3	2.000	210	122	1.721	Semifinals
3	Uruguay	3	1	2	4	3	6	0.500	147	200	0.735	
4	Paraguay	3	0	3	3	0	9	0.000	115	229	0.502	

Date		Score		Set 1	Set 2	Set 3	Set 4	Set 5	Total
1 Sep	Argentina	3–0	Uruguay	25–11	25–6	25–15			75–32
1 Sep	Peru	3–0	Paraguay	25–12	25–5	25–15			75–32
2 Sep	Argentina	3–0	Paraguay	25–12	25–14	25–7			75–33
2 Sep	Peru	3–0	Uruguay	25–11	25–12	25–13			75–36
3 Sep	Uruguay	3–0	Paraguay	29–27	25–8	25–15			79–50
3 Sep	Peru	3–0	Argentina	25–22	25–18	25–20			75–60

== Final round ==
- Venue: Coliseo Eduardo Dibos, Lima, Peru

=== Championship bracket ===
Semifinal
2008-09-05 – Lima
Peru	3
Venezuela	0
2008-09-05 – Lima
Brazil	3
Argentina	0

1st place match
2008-09-06 – Lima
Peru	1
Brazil	3
3rd place match
2008-09-06 – Lima
Venezuela	3
Argentina	1

=== Semifinals ===
Date		Score		Set 1	Set 2	Set 3	Set 4	Set 5	Total
5 Sep	Brazil	3–0	Argentina	25–20	25–16	25–22			75–58
5 Sep	Peru	3–0	Venezuela	25–14	25–17	25–22			75–53

=== 7th place match ===
Date		Score		Set 1	Set 2	Set 3	Set 4	Set 5	Total
5 Sep	Paraguay	0–3	Chile	13–25	18–25	10–25			41–75

=== 5th place match ===
Date		Score		Set 1	Set 2	Set 3	Set 4	Set 5	Total
5 Sep	Colombia	3–0	Uruguay	25–17	25–11	25–13			75–41

=== Bronze medal match ===
Date		Score		Set 1	Set 2	Set 3	Set 4	Set 5	Total
6 Sep	Venezuela	3–1	Argentina	33–31	19–25	25–20	25–23		102–99

=== Gold medal match ===
Date		Score		Set 1	Set 2	Set 3	Set 4	Set 5	Total
6 Sep	Peru	1–3	Brazil	27–25	12–25	20–25	19–25		78–100

== Final standing ==
Rank	Team
1st place, gold medalist(s)	Brazil
2nd place, silver medalist(s)	Peru
3rd place, bronze medalist(s)	Venezuela
4	Argentina
5	Colombia
6	Uruguay
7	Chile
8	Paraguay

Qualified for the 2009 Youth World Championship

2008 Girls' Youth South American Volleyball Championship

Brazil
13th title

== Individual awards ==
- Most valuable player
  - Sthéfanie Paulino (BRA)
- Best spiker
  - Vivian Baella (PER)
- Best blocker
  - Nelamira Valdez (VEN)
- Best server
  - Josefina Baili (ARG)
- Best digger
  - Samara Almeida (BRA)
- Best setter
  - Rosane Maggioni (BRA)
- Best receiver
  - Lisset Sosa (PER)
- Best libero
  - Priscila Almeida (BRA)
