= 2017 FIVB Volleyball Girls' U18 World Championship =

2017 FIVB Girls' U18 World Championship
Campeonato Mundial de Femenino Sub-18 Argentina 2017

Tournament details
- Host country: Argentina
- Dates: 18–27 August
- Teams: 20
- Venues: 2 (in 2 host cities)

Final positions
- Champions: Italy (2nd title)

Tournament awards
- MVP: (Italy) Elena Pietrini

The 2017 FIVB Volleyball Girls' U18 World Championship was the fifteenth edition of the international volleyball tournament and the world championship for women's national teams under the age of 18, organized by the sport's world governing body, FIVB. The tournament was hosted by Argentina in the cities of Rosario and Santa Fe from 18 to 27 August 2017. 20 teams from the 5 confederations competed in the tournament.

Italy won its second title in the competition, after also winning the previous edition, defeating Dominican Republic in the final. Russia defeated Turkey for the bronze medal. Elena Pietrini from Italy was elected the MVP.

== Qualification ==
The FIVB Sports Events Council revealed a proposal to streamline the number of teams participating in the Age Group World Championships.

Means of qualification		Date	Venue	Vacancies	Qualifier
Host country		2 February 2016	(Switzerland) Lausanne	1	Argentina
2016 South American Championship		24–28 August 2016	(Peru) Lima	2	Brazil
2016 South American Championship		24–28 August 2016	(Peru) Lima	2	Peru
2016 NORCECA Championship		2–7 September 2016	(Puerto Rico) San Juan	2	Dominican Republic
2016 NORCECA Championship		2–7 September 2016	(Puerto Rico) San Juan	2	United States
2017 Asian Championship		5–13 March 2017	(China) Chongqing	4	Japan
2017 Asian Championship		5–13 March 2017	(China) Chongqing	4	China
2017 Asian Championship		5–13 March 2017	(China) Chongqing	4	South Korea
2017 Asian Championship		5–13 March 2017	(China) Chongqing	4	Thailand
2017 Pan-American Cup	for CSV	28 March – 2 April 2017	(Cuba) Havana	1	Colombia
2017 Pan-American Cup	for NORCECA	28 March – 2 April 2017	(Cuba) Havana	2	Cuba
2017 Pan-American Cup	for NORCECA	28 March – 2 April 2017	(Cuba) Havana	2	Mexico
2017 European Championship		1–9 April 2017	(Netherlands) Arnhem	6	Russia
2017 European Championship		1–9 April 2017	(Netherlands) Arnhem	6	Italy
2017 European Championship		1–9 April 2017	(Netherlands) Arnhem	6	Belarus
2017 European Championship		1–9 April 2017	(Netherlands) Arnhem	6	Serbia
2017 European Championship		1–9 April 2017	(Netherlands) Arnhem	6	Slovenia
2017 European Championship		1–9 April 2017	(Netherlands) Arnhem	6	Germany
World Ranking		As per 1 January 2017	(Switzerland) Lausanne	2	Turkey
World Ranking		As per 1 January 2017	(Switzerland) Lausanne	2	Poland
Total				20	

== Pools composition ==
The drawing of lots was held in Rosario, Argentina on 10 May 2017. Argentina as a host country team were seeded in the top position of pool A, And the top seven teams from World ranking as per January 2017 were seed in serpentine system in first two rows. the twelve remaining teams were drawn in next three rows under the condition that there were not too much country in the same confederation were drawn in the same pool. Numbers in brackets denote the World ranking.

Pool A	Pool B	Pool C	Pool D
Argentina (10)	United States (1)	Italy (2)	China (3)
Germany (7)	Russia (6)	Serbia (5)	Turkey (4)
Slovenia (37)	Belarus (45)	Poland (15)	Japan (8)
South Korea (18)	Brazil (9)	Colombia (22)	Peru (14)
Cuba (29)	Mexico (16)	Thailand (16)	Dominican Rep. (12)

== Venues ==
Pool C, D and Final round	Pool A, B and Final round
Rosario, Argentina	Santa Fe, Argentina
Estadio Cubierto Newell's Old Boys	Estadio Universidad Tecnológica de Santa Fe
Capacity: 7,500	Capacity: 5,000

== Referees ==
AVC (4)

- (Australia) Carla Hoorweg
- (China) Wang Ziling
- (South Korea) Kang Joo-Hee
- (Syria) Maissaa Hachem

CAVB (2)

- (Cameroon) Marthe Clémence Eyike
- (Egypt) Waleed El Kheshen

CEV (5)

- (France) Olivier Guillet
- (Montenegro) Sonja Simonovska
- (Poland) Sokol Katarzyna
- (Russia) Kozlova Nadezhda
- (Ukraine) Mykhaylo Medvid

CSV (5)

- (Argentina) Concia Pedro Fabia
- (Brazil) Silvio Silveira
- (Colombia) Jorge Ernesto Erazo Maldonado
- (Peru) Rocio Aida Huarcaya Lopez
- (Uruguay) Denis Fabián Carbajal Mozzo

NORCECA (4)

- (Cuba) Lourdes Perez Perez
- (Mexico) Daniel Gonzalez
- (Trinidad and Tobago) Brian Charles
- (United States) Patricia Rolf

== Pool standing procedure ==
1. Number of matches won
2. Match points
3. Sets ratio
4. Points ratio
5. If the tie continues as per the point ratio between two teams, the priority will be given to the team which won the last match between them. When the tie in points ratio is between three or more teams, a new classification of these teams in the terms of points 1, 2 and 3 will be made taking into consideration only the matches in which they were opposed to each other.

Match won 3–0 or 3–1: 3 match points for the winner, 0 match points for the loser
Match won 3–2: 2 match points for the winner, 1 match point for the loser

== Preliminary round ==
- All times are Argentina Standard Time (UTC−03:00).

=== Pool A ===
Pos	Team	Pld	W	L	Pts	SW	SL	SR	SPW	SPL	SPR	Qualification
1	Argentina	4	4	0	11	12	4	3.000	377	317	1.189	Round of 16
2	Slovenia	4	2	2	7	9	6	1.500	322	307	1.049	Round of 16
3	Germany	4	2	2	5	9	10	0.900	395	393	1.005	Round of 16
4	South Korea	4	2	2	5	6	9	0.667	305	328	0.930	Round of 16
5	Cuba	4	0	4	2	5	12	0.417	327	381	0.858	17th–20th round robin

Date	Time		Score		Set 1	Set 2	Set 3	Set 4	Set 5	Total	Report
18 Aug	17:30	Slovenia	3–0	South Korea	25–16	25–18	26–24			76–58	P2 P3
18 Aug	19:30	Germany	1–3	Argentina	17–25	23–25	27–25	14–25		81–100	P2 P3
19 Aug	17:30	Cuba	2–3	Germany	22–25	25–16	25–22	20–25	10–15	102–103	P2 P3
19 Aug	19:30	Slovenia	1–3	Argentina	21–25	20–25	25–21	18–25		84–96	P2 P3
20 Aug	17:30	Cuba	0–3	Slovenia	12–25	17–25	22–25			51–75	P2 P3
20 Aug	19:30	South Korea	0–3	Argentina	21–25	15–25	10–25			46–75	P2 P3
21 Aug	17:30	Germany	3–2	Slovenia	19–25	25–15	25–12	18–25	15–10	102–87	P2 P3
21 Aug	19:30	Cuba	1–3	South Korea	16–25	18–25	25–22	9–25		68–97	P2 P3
22 Aug	17:30	Germany	2–3	South Korea	25–21	25–18	23–25	23–25	13–15	109–104	P2 P3
22 Aug	19:30	Cuba	2–3	Argentina	25–23	25–16	20–25	25–27	11–15	106–106	P2 P3

=== Pool B ===
Pos	Team	Pld	W	L	Pts	SW	SL	SR	SPW	SPL	SPR	Qualification
1	Russia	4	4	0	11	12	2	6.000	333	260	1.281	Round of 16
2	Belarus	4	3	1	9	9	4	2.250	304	262	1.160	Round of 16
3	United States	4	2	2	4	7	10	0.700	338	383	0.883	Round of 16
4	Brazil	4	1	3	5	7	9	0.778	337	329	1.024	Round of 16
5	Mexico	4	0	4	1	2	12	0.167	258	336	0.768	17th–20th round robin

Date	Time		Score		Set 1	Set 2	Set 3	Set 4	Set 5	Total	Report
18 Aug	10:00	Belarus	3–0	Brazil	25–18	26–24	25–14			76–56	P2 P3
18 Aug	12:00	Russia	3–0	Mexico	25–18	25–14	25–13			75–45	P2 P3
19 Aug	10:00	United States	0–3	Russia	17–25	20–25	19–25			56–75	P2 P3
19 Aug	12:00	Belarus	3–0	Mexico	25–19	25–20	25–14			75–53	P2 P3
20 Aug	10:00	Brazil	3–0	Mexico	25–17	25–16	25–19			75–52	P2 P3
20 Aug	12:00	United States	1–3	Belarus	20–25	13–25	25–21	20–25		78–96	P2 P3
21 Aug	10:00	Russia	3–0	Belarus	25–18	25–20	25–19			75–57	P2 P3
21 Aug	12:00	United States	3–2	Brazil	26–24	19–25	8–25	25–19	15–11	93–104	P2 P3
22 Aug	10:00	United States	3–2	Mexico	17–25	24–26	25–19	30–28	15–10	111–108	P2 P3
22 Aug	12:00	Russia	3–2	Brazil	25–23	23–25	25–20	20–25	15–9	108–102	P2 P3

=== Pool C ===
Pos	Team	Pld	W	L	Pts	SW	SL	SR	SPW	SPL	SPR	Qualification
1	Italy	4	4	0	11	12	2	6.000	336	250	1.344	Round of 16
2	Poland	4	3	1	10	11	4	2.750	352	311	1.132	Round of 16
3	Serbia	4	2	2	6	6	7	0.857	287	286	1.003	Round of 16
4	Colombia	4	1	3	3	4	9	0.444	277	293	0.945	Round of 16
5	Thailand	4	0	4	0	1	12	0.083	213	325	0.655	17th–20th round robin

Date	Time		Score		Set 1	Set 2	Set 3	Set 4	Set 5	Total	Report
18 Aug	17:30	Poland	3–0	Colombia	25–23	25–7	27–25			77–55	P2 P3
18 Aug	19:30	Serbia	3–0	Thailand	25–16	27–25	25–6			77–47	P2 P3
19 Aug	17:30	Italy	3–0	Serbia	25–15	25–18	25–18			75–51	P2 P3
19 Aug	19:30	Poland	3–1	Thailand	25–21	23–25	25–17	25–11		98–74	P2 P3
20 Aug	17:30	Italy	3–2	Poland	22–25	25–16	25–20	23–25	15–12	110–98	P2 P3
20 Aug	19:30	Colombia	3–0	Thailand	25–14	25–17	25–22			75–53	P2 P3
21 Aug	17:30	Serbia	0–3	Poland	27–29	22–25	23–25			72–79	P2 P3
21 Aug	19:30	Italy	3–0	Colombia	25–19	25–19	26–24			76–62	P2 P3
22 Aug	17:30	Serbia	3–1	Colombia	25–18	12–25	25–20	25–22		87–85	P2 P3
22 Aug	19:30	Italy	3–0	Thailand	25–10	25–12	25–17			75–39	P2 P3

=== Pool D ===
Pos	Team	Pld	W	L	Pts	SW	SL	SR	SPW	SPL	SPR	Qualification
1	Turkey	4	4	0	12	12	2	6.000	344	263	1.308	Round of 16
2	Japan	4	3	1	9	10	3	3.333	322	253	1.273	Round of 16
3	Dominican Republic	4	2	2	6	7	7	1.000	289	301	0.960	Round of 16
4	Peru	4	1	3	3	4	10	0.400	306	320	0.956	Round of 16
5	China	4	0	4	0	1	12	0.083	198	322	0.615	17th–20th round robin

Date	Time		Score		Set 1	Set 2	Set 3	Set 4	Set 5	Total	Report
18 Aug	10:00	Japan	3–0	Peru	25–23	26–24	25–18			76–65	P2 P3
18 Aug	12:00	Turkey	3–1	Dominican Republic	25–21	18–25	25–16	25–14		93–76	P2 P3
19 Aug	10:00	China	0–3	Turkey	22–25	8–25	5–25			35–75	P2 P3
19 Aug	12:00	Japan	3–0	Dominican Republic	25–20	25–8	25–19			75–47	P2 P3
20 Aug	10:00	Peru	1–3	Dominican Republic	18–25	25–16	22–25	23–25		88–91	P2 P3
20 Aug	12:00	China	0–3	Japan	13–25	11–25	16–25			40–75	P2 P3
21 Aug	10:00	Turkey	3–1	Japan	25–20	25–23	21–25	30–28		101–96	P2 P3
21 Aug	12:00	China	1–3	Peru	17–25	25–22	18–25	18–25		78–97	P2 P3
22 Aug	10:00	China	0–3	Dominican Republic	13–25	11–25	21–25			45–75	P2 P3
22 Aug	12:00	Turkey	3–0	Peru	25–20	25–17	25–19			75–56	P2 P3

== Final round ==
- All times are Argentina Standard Time (UTC−03:00).

=== Championship bracket ===
Round of 16
23 August
Russia	3
South Korea	1
23 August
Japan	3
Serbia	2
23 August
Argentina	3
Brazil	1
23 August
Poland	2
Dominican Republic	3
23 August
Italy	3
Peru	0
23 August
Slovenia	0
United States	3
23 August
Turkey	3
Colombia	0
23 August
Belarus	2
Germany	3

Quarterfinals
25 August
Russia	3
Japan	0
25 August
Argentina	0
Dominican Republic	3
25 August
Italy	3
United States	0
25 August
Turkey	3
Germany	0

Semifinals
26 August
Russia	0
Dominican Republic	3
26 August
Italy	3
Turkey	1

Final
27 August
Dominican Republic	1
Italy	3
3rd place match
27 August
Russia	3
Turkey	1

==== Round of 16 ====
Date	Time		Score		Set 1	Set 2	Set 3	Set 4	Set 5	Total	Report
23 Aug	12:00	Russia	3–1	South Korea	25–17	25–16	18–25	25–18		93–76	P2 P3
23 Aug	12:00	Japan	3–2	Serbia	25–21	25–18	26–28	19–25	17–15	112–107	P2 P3
23 Aug	16:00	Belarus	2–3	Germany	25–20	22–25	18–25	25–16	10–15	100–101	P2 P3
23 Aug	16:00	Turkey	3–0	Colombia	25–14	25–13	25–19			75–46	P2 P3
23 Aug	18:00	Slovenia	0–3	United States	21–25	18–25	22–25			61–75	P2 P3
23 Aug	18:00	Italy	3–0	Peru	25–20	25–13	25–13			75–46	P2 P3
23 Aug	20:00	Poland	2–3	Dominican Republic	21–25	22–25	25–15	25–20	14–16	107–101	P2 P3
23 Aug	20:00	Argentina	3–1	Brazil	22–25	25–23	25–17	25–18		97–83	P2 P3

==== Quarterfinals ====
Date	Time		Score		Set 1	Set 2	Set 3	Set 4	Set 5	Total	Report
25 Aug	13:00	United States	0–3	Italy	7–25	16–25	15–25			38–75	P2 P3
25 Aug	16:00	Germany	0–3	Turkey	20–25	8–25	28–30			56–80	P2 P3
25 Aug	18:00	Russia	3–0	Japan	25–22	25–17	32–30			82–69	P2 P3
25 Aug	20:00	Argentina	0–3	Dominican Republic	21–25	17–25	18–25			56–75	P2 P3

==== Semifinals ====
Date	Time		Score		Set 1	Set 2	Set 3	Set 4	Set 5	Total	Report
26 Aug	18:00	Italy	3–1	Turkey	25–20	25–22	27–29	26–24		103–95	P2 P3
26 Aug	20:00	Dominican Republic	3–0	Russia	25–17	28–26	25–21			78–64	P2 P3

==== 3rd place match ====
Date	Time		Score		Set 1	Set 2	Set 3	Set 4	Set 5	Total	Report
27 Aug	17:30	Turkey	1–3	Russia	21–25	21–25	25–16	15–25		82–91	P2 P3

==== Final ====
Date	Time		Score		Set 1	Set 2	Set 3	Set 4	Set 5	Total	Report
27 Aug	19:30	Italy	3–1	Dominican Republic	25–23	19–25	25–12	25–20		94–80	P2 P3

=== 5th–8th places ===
5th–8th semifinals
26 August
United States	1
Germany	3
26 August
Argentina	0
Japan	3

5th place match
27 August
Germany	0
Japan	3
7th place match
27 August
United States	1
Argentina	3

==== 5th–8th semifinals ====
Date	Time		Score		Set 1	Set 2	Set 3	Set 4	Set 5	Total	Report
26 Aug	13:00	United States	1–3	Germany	25–20	22–25	17–25	17–25		81–95	P2 P3
26 Aug	16:00	Argentina	0–3	Japan	18–25	19–25	17–25			54–75	P2 P3

==== 7th place match ====
Date	Time		Score		Set 1	Set 2	Set 3	Set 4	Set 5	Total	Report
27 Aug	10:00	United States	1–3	Argentina	17–25	19–25	25–19	28–30		89–99	P2 P3

==== 5th place match ====
Date	Time		Score		Set 1	Set 2	Set 3	Set 4	Set 5	Total	Report
27 Aug	12:00	Germany	0–3	Japan	22–25	10–25	21–25			53–75	P2 P3

=== 9th–16th places ===
9th–16th quarterfinals
25 August
Slovenia	1
Peru	3
25 August
Belarus	3
Colombia	0
25 August
South Korea	3
Serbia	1
25 August
Brazil	3
Poland	1

9th–12th semifinals
26 August
Peru	0
Belarus	3
26 August
South Korea	0
Brazil	3

9th place match
27 August
Belarus	3
Brazil	1
11th place match
27 August
Peru	1
South Korea	3

13th–16th semifinals
26 August
Poland	1
Serbia	3
26 August
Slovenia	2
Colombia	3

13th place match
27 August
Serbia	3
Colombia	0
15th place match
27 August
Poland	2
Slovenia	3

==== 9th–16th quarterfinals ====
Date	Time		Score		Set 1	Set 2	Set 3	Set 4	Set 5	Total	Report
25 Aug	14:00	Brazil	3–1	Poland	21–25	25–18	25–16	25–17		96–76	P2 P3
25 Aug	16:00	Slovenia	1–3	Peru	20–25	25–19	22–25	17–25		84–94	P2 P3
25 Aug	18:00	Belarus	3–0	Colombia	25–16	25–19	25–21			75–56	P2 P3
25 Aug	20:00	South Korea	3–1	Serbia	25–17	23–25	25–14	25–23		98–79	P2 P3

==== 13th–16th semifinals ====
Date	Time		Score		Set 1	Set 2	Set 3	Set 4	Set 5	Total	Report
26 Aug	14:00	Slovenia	2–3	Colombia	25–22	16–25	25–18	16–25	10–15	92–105	P2 P3
26 Aug	16:00	Poland	1–3	Serbia	24–26	25–23	16–25	12–25		77–99	P2 P3

==== 9th–12th semifinals ====
Date	Time		Score		Set 1	Set 2	Set 3	Set 4	Set 5	Total	Report
26 Aug	18:00	Peru	0–3	Belarus	18–25	17–25	23–25			58–75	P2 P3
26 Aug	20:00	Brazil	3–0	South Korea	25–13	25–13	25–15			75–41	P2 P3

==== 15th place match ====
Date	Time		Score		Set 1	Set 2	Set 3	Set 4	Set 5	Total	Report
27 Aug	10:00	Poland	2–3	Slovenia	25–16	25–22	13–25	19–25	12–15	94–103	P2 P3

==== 13th place match ====
Date	Time		Score		Set 1	Set 2	Set 3	Set 4	Set 5	Total	Report
27 Aug	12:00	Serbia	3–0	Colombia	25–18	25–18	25–21			75–57	P2 P3

==== 11th place match ====
Date	Time		Score		Set 1	Set 2	Set 3	Set 4	Set 5	Total	Report
27 Aug	14:00	Peru	1–3	South Korea	22–25	20–25	27–25	16–25		85–100	P2 P3

==== 9th place match ====
Date	Time		Score		Set 1	Set 2	Set 3	Set 4	Set 5	Total	Report
27 Aug	16:00	Belarus	3–1	Brazil	25–23	25–21	20–25	25–23		95–92	P2 P3

=== 17th–20th places ===
Pos	Team	Pld	W	L	Pts	SW	SL	SR	SPW	SPL	SPR
1	Thailand	3	2	1	7	8	3	2.667	250	231	1.082
2	Mexico	3	2	1	5	6	6	1.000	260	246	1.057
3	China	3	1	2	4	5	6	0.833	239	255	0.937
4	Cuba	3	1	2	2	4	8	0.500	253	270	0.937

Date	Time		Score		Set 1	Set 2	Set 3	Set 4	Set 5	Total	Report
23 Aug	09:00	Cuba	1–3	Mexico	15–25	25–16	17–25	16–25		73–91	P2 P3
23 Aug	11:00	Thailand	3–0	China	25–22	25–17	25–23			75–62	P2 P3
25 Aug	09:00	Cuba	0–3	China	23–25	23–25	27–29			73–79	P2 P3
25 Aug	11:00	Mexico	0–3	Thailand	23–25	20–25	19–25			62–75	P2 P3
26 Aug	09:00	Mexico	3–2	China	25–22	21–25	25–13	21–25	15–13	107–98	P2 P3
26 Aug	11:00	Cuba	3–2	Thailand	25–20	23–25	18–25	25–16	16–14	107–100	P2 P3

== Final standing ==
Rank	Team
1st place, gold medalist(s)	Italy
2nd place, silver medalist(s)	Dominican Republic
3rd place, bronze medalist(s)	Russia
4	Turkey
5	Japan
6	Germany
7	Argentina
8	United States
9	Belarus
10	Brazil
11	South Korea
12	Peru
13	Serbia
14	Colombia
15	Slovenia
16	Poland
17	Thailand
18	Mexico
19	China
20	Cuba

2017 Girls' U18 World champions

Italy
2nd title

12–woman roster
Terry Enweonwu, Valeria Battista, Marina Lubian, Sarah Fahr, Fatime Kone, Elena Pietrini, Alessia Populini (c), Sara Panetoni, Francesca Scola, Alice Tanase, Rachele Morello, Virginia Peruzzo
Head coach
Marco Mencarelli

== Awards ==
- Most valuable player
  (Italy) Elena Pietrini
- Best setter
  (Italy) Rachele Morello
- Best outside spikers
  (Dominican Republic) Madeline Guillen
  (Turkey) Ebrar Karakurt
- Best middle blockers
  (Russia) Victoriia Pushina
  (Italy) Sarah Fahr
- Best opposite spiker
  (Italy) Terry Enweonwu
- Best libero
  (Dominican Republic) Yaneirys Rodríguez

== See also ==
- 2017 FIVB Volleyball Boys' U19 World Championship
