= Tainara Santos =

Brazilian volleyball player (born 2000)

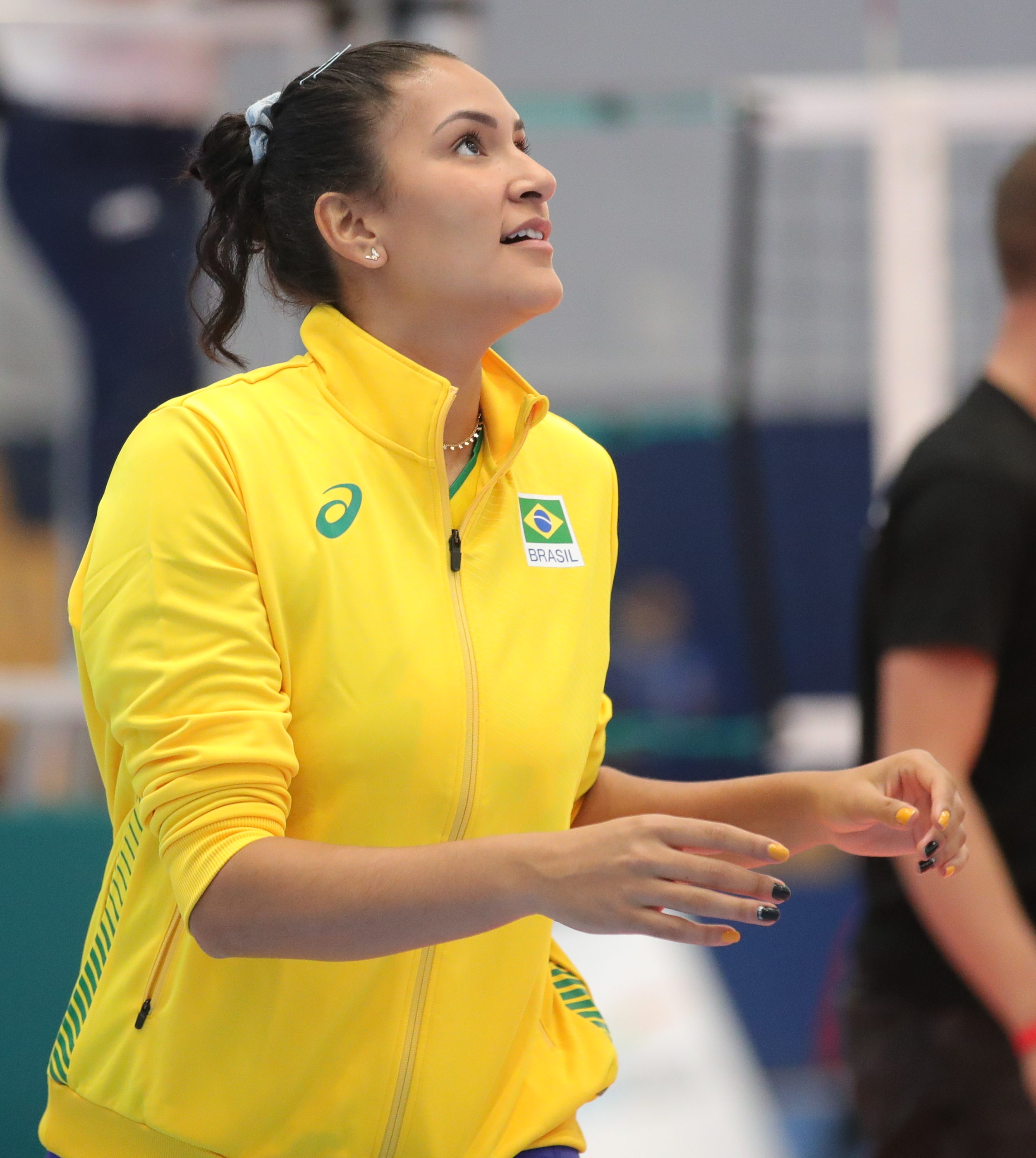
- Santos in 2022

Personal information
- Full name: Tainara Lemes Santos Figueiredo
- Nickname: Tai
- Nationality: Brazilian
- Born: 9 March 2000 (age 26); Jandira, SP, Brazil
- Height: 190 cm (6 ft 3 in)
Honours
Women's volleyball
Representing Brazil
Olympic Games
Bronze medal – third place	2024 Paris	Team
FIVB World Championship
Silver medal – second place	2022 Poland/Netherlands	Team
Bronze medal – third place	2025 Thailand	Team
Nations League
Silver medal – second place	2025 Łódź	Team
Silver medal – second place	2026 Macau	Team
Pan American Games
Silver medal – second place	2023 Santiago
South American Championship
Gold medal – first place	2023 Recife
Gold medal – first place	2026 Rio de Janeiro

Tainara Lemes Santos Figueiredo (Brazilian Portuguese pronunciation: [tajˈnaɾɐ ˈlemis ˈsɐ̃tus]; born 9 March 2000) is a Brazilian volleyball player. She represented Brazil at the 2024 Summer Olympics and won a bronze medal in the women's tournament.
