= 2015 in volleyball =

The following were the events of Volleyball for the year 2015 throughout the world.

== Beach volleyball ==
- April 21 – November 13: 2015 FIVB Beach Volleyball World Tour

=== Beach volleyball championships ===
- June 26 – July 5: 2015 Beach Volleyball World Championships in the Netherlands
  - Men's winners: (Brazil) Alison Cerutti / Bruno Oscar Schmidt
  - Women's winners: (Brazil) Agatha Bednarczuk / Bárbara Seixas
- July 28 – August 2: 2015 European Beach Volleyball Championships in (Austria) Klagenfurt
  - Men's winners: (Latvia) Jānis Šmēdiņš / Aleksandrs Samoilovs
  - Women's winners: (Germany) Laura Ludwig / Kira Walkenhorst
- September 2 – 6: Aquece Rio Open 2015 in Brazil (Olympic Test Event)
  - Men's winners: (Latvia) Jānis Šmēdiņš / Aleksandrs Samoilovs
  - Women's winners: (Brazil) Larissa França / Talita Antunes
- September 29 – October 4: 2015 World Tour Finals in (United States) Fort Lauderdale, Florida
  - Men's winners: (Brazil) Alison Cerutti / Bruno Oscar Schmidt
  - Women's winners: (Brazil) Larissa França / Talita Antunes

=== BV Grand Slams ===
- May 26 – August 30: 2015 FIVB Beach Volleyball Grand Slam
  - May 26 – 31: Grand Slam #1 in (Russia) Moscow
    - Men's winners: (Spain) Pablo Herrera / Adrián Gavira
    - Women's winners: (Brazil) Larissa França / Talita Antunes
  - June 16 – 21: Grand Slam #2 in (United States) St. Petersburg, Florida
    - Men's winners: (United States) Jake Gibb / Casey Patterson
    - Women's winners: (Brazil) Agatha Bednarczuk / Bárbara Seixas
  - July 21 – 26: Grand Slam #3 in (Japan) Yokohama
    - Men's winners: (Brazil) Alison Cerutti / Bruno Oscar Schmidt
    - Women's winners: (Germany) Laura Ludwig / Kira Walkenhorst
  - August 18 – 23: Grand Slam #4 in (United States) Long Beach, California
    - Men's winners: (Brazil) Alison Cerutti / Bruno Oscar Schmidt
    - Women's winners: (Brazil) Larissa França / Talita Antunes
  - August 25 – 30: Grand Slam #5 (final) in (Poland) Olsztyn
    - Men's winners: (Brazil) Alison Cerutti / Bruno Oscar Schmidt
    - Women's winners: (Brazil) Larissa França / Talita Antunes

=== BV Majors ===
- June 2 – July 12: 2015 FIVB Beach Volleyball Majors
  - June 2 – 7: Major #1 in (Croatia) Poreč
    - Men's Winners: (Netherlands) Alexander Brouwer / Robert Meeuwsen
    - Women's Winners: (Brazil) Larissa França / Talita Antunes
  - June 9 – 14: Major #2 in (Norway) Stavanger
    - Men's Winners: (Brazil) Evandro Gonçalves Oliveira Júnior / Pedro Solberg Salgado
    - Women's Winners: (Brazil) Juliana Silva / Maria Antonelli
  - July 7 – 12: Major #3 (final) in (Switzerland) Gstaad
    - Men's Winners: (Brazil) Alison Cerutti / Bruno Oscar Schmidt
    - Women's Winners: (Brazil) Larissa França / Talita Antunes

=== BV Open ===
- April 21 – December 13: 2015 FIVB Beach Volleyball Open
  - April 21 – 26: Open #1 in (China) Fuzhou
    - Men's winners: (Germany) Markus Böckermann / Lars Flüggen
    - Women's winners: (Canada) Jamie Lynn Broder / Kristina Valjas
  - May 12 – 17: Open #2 in (Switzerland) Lucerne
    - Men's winners: (Italy) Alex Ranghieri / Marco Caminati
    - Women's winners: (Germany) Karla Borger / Britta Büthe
  - May 20 – 24: Open #3 in (Czech Republic) Prague (women only)
    - Winners: (Brazil) Ágatha Bednarczuk / Bárbara Seixas
  - September 8 – 13: Open #4 in (Russia) Sochi
    - Men's winners: (Latvia) Jānis Šmēdiņš / Aleksandrs Samoilovs
    - Women's winners: (Italy) Marta Menegatti / Viktoria Orsi Toth
  - September 22 – 27: Open #5 in (China) Xiamen
    - Men's winners: (United States) Nicholas Lucena / Phil Dalhausser
    - Women's winners: (Switzerland) Nadine Zumkehr / Joana Heidrich
  - October 6 – 11: Open #6 in (Mexico) Puerto Vallarta
    - Men's winners: (United States) Nicholas Lucena / Phil Dalhausser
    - Women's winners: (Germany) Laura Ludwig / Kira Walkenhorst
  - October 20 – 25: Open #7 in (Turkey) Antalya
    - Men's winners: (Italy) Alex Ranghieri / Adrian Ignacio Carambula Raurich
    - Women's winners: (Czech Republic) Markéta Sluková / Barbora Hermannová
  - November 9 – 13: Open #8 (final) in (Qatar) Doha (men only)
    - Winners: (Germany) Markus Böckermann / Lars Flüggen

== Volleyball ==
=== Events ===
==== Men's national teams ====
===== CAVB =====
- July 20 – 31: 2015 Men's African Volleyball Championship in Cairo, Egypt.
  - (gold) : Egypt
  - (silver) : Tunisia
  - (bronze) : Morocco

===== FIVB =====
- May 15 – July 19: 2015 FIVB Volleyball World League
  - July 3 – 5: Group 3 Finals in (Slovakia) Bratislava
  - (gold) : Egypt
  - (silver) : Montenegro
  - (bronze) : Slovakia
  - July 10 – 12: Group 2 Finals in (Bulgaria) Varna
  - (gold) : France
  - (silver) : Bulgaria
  - (bronze) : Argentina
  - July 15 – 19: Group 1 Finals in (Brazil) Rio de Janeiro (Olympic Test Event)
  - (gold) : France
  - (silver) : Serbia
  - (bronze) : United States
- September 8 – 23: 2015 FIVB Volleyball Men's World Cup in Japan
  - (gold) : United States (10 wins and 30 points) (second FIVB Volleyball Men's World Cup title)
  - (silver) : Italy (10 wins, 29 points, and set ratio of 3.750)
  - (bronze) : Poland (10 wins, 29 points, and set ratio of 2.818)

=== Club continental champions ===
==== Men ====
Region	Tournament	Defending Champion	Champion	Title	Last honor	Runner up
African Volleyball Confederation (CAVB)	2015 African Clubs Championship	(Tunisia) ES Tunis VC	(Egypt) Al Ahly SC	11th	2011	(Tunisia) Espérance Sportive de Tunis
CEV (Europe)	2014–15 CEV Champions League	(Russia) Belogorie Belgorod	(Russia) VC Zenit-Kazan	3rd	2011–12	(Poland) Asseco Resovia Rzeszów
FIVB (Worldwide)	2015 FIVB Volleyball Men's Club World Championship	(Russia) Belogorie Belgorod	(Brazil) Sada Cruzeiro	2nd	2013	(Russia) Zenit Kazan

==== Women ====
Region	Tournament	Defending Champion	Champion	Title	Last honor	Runner up
African Volleyball Confederation (CAVB)	2015 Women's African Clubs Championship	(Algeria) GSP Alger	(Egypt) Al Ahly Club	6th	2009	Kenya Pipelines
CEV (Europe)	2014–15 CEV Women's Champions League	(Russia) Dinamo Kazan	(Turkey) Eczacıbaşı VitrA	1st	—	(Italy) Yamamay Busto Arsizio
FIVB (Worldwide)	2015 FIVB Volleyball Women's Club World Championship	(Russia) Dinamo Kazan	(Turkey) Eczacıbaşı VitrA	1st	—	(Russia) Dinamo Krasnodar

=== Leagues ===
- June 26 – August 2: 2015 FIVB World Grand Prix
  - July 10 – 12: Group 3 Finals in (Australia) Canberra
    - Kenya defeated Peru, 3–1 in matches played, in the final. Colombia took the bronze medal.
  - July 31 – August 2: Group 2 Finals in Lublin
    - The Netherlands defeated Poland, 3–0 in matches played, in the final. Czech Republic took the bronze medal.
  - July 22 – 26: Group 1 Finals in Omaha, Nebraska
    - The United States win their sixth FIVB World Grand Prix title by winning all their matches.
    - Russia took the silver medal. Brazil took the bronze medal.
- July 3 – August 14: 2015 Men's European Volleyball League
  - Slovenia defeated Macedonia, 3–0 in matches played, to win their first Men's European Volleyball League title. Poland took third place.
- July 30 – September 13: 2015 Women's European Volleyball League
  - Hungary defeated Turkey, 4–3 in matches played, to win their first Women's European Volleyball League title. Greece and Israel tied for third place.

=== World volleyball championships ===
- August 7 – 16: 2015 FIVB Volleyball Girls' U18 World Championship in (Peru) Lima
  - Italy defeated the United States, 3–0 in matches played, to win their first FIVB Volleyball Girls' U18 World Championship title. China took the bronze medal.
- August 12 – 19: 2015 FIVB Volleyball Women's U23 World Championship in Ankara
  - Brazil defeated Turkey, 3–1 in matches played, to win their first FIVB Volleyball Women's U23 World Championship title. Dominican Republic took the bronze medal.
- August 14 – 23: 2015 FIVB Volleyball Boys' U19 World Championship in Resistencia, Chaco and Corrientes
  - Poland defeated Argentina, 3–2 in matches played, to win their first FIVB Volleyball Boys' U19 World Championship title. Iran took the bronze medal.
- August 24 – 31: 2015 FIVB Volleyball Men's U23 World Championship in (United Arab Emirates) Dubai
  - Russia defeated Turkey, 3–1 in matches played, to win their first FIVB Volleyball Men's U23 World Championship title. Italy took the bronze medal.
- September 11 – 19: 2015 FIVB Volleyball Women's U20 World Championship in Caguas, Puerto Rico
  - The Dominican Republic defeated Brazil, 3–2, in matches played, to win their first FIVB Volleyball Women's U20 World Championship title. Italy took the bronze medal.
- September 11 – 20: 2015 FIVB Volleyball Men's U21 World Championship in (Mexico) Tijuana-Mexicali
  - Russia defeated Argentina, 3–2 in matches played, to win their tenth FIVB Volleyball Men's U21 World Championship title. This includes the 1977, 1981, 1985, and 1989 title wins, when it was part of the unified Soviet Union. China took the bronze medal.

=== Other volleyball events ===
==== African Volleyball Confederation (CAVB) ====
- January 21 – 24: 2015 African Volleyball Championship U19 in Kelibia
  - Winner: Egypt (5 points)
  - Second: Tunisia (4 points)
  - Third: Algeria (no points)
- February 27 – March 1: 2015 African Volleyball Championship U21 in Cairo
  - Winner: Egypt (6 points)
  - Second: Algeria (3 points)
  - Third: Morocco (no points)
- February 27 – March 1: 2015 Women's Junior African Volleyball Championship in Cairo
  - Winner: Egypt (6 points)
  - Second: Algeria (2 points)
  - Third: Kenya (1 point)
- June 12 – 20: 2015 Women's African Volleyball Championship in Nairobi
  - Kenya defeated Algeria, 3–0 in matches played, to win their ninth Women's African Volleyball Championship title. Cameroon took third place.

==== European Volleyball Confederation (CEV) ====
- October 25, 2014 – April 12, 2015: 2014–15 CEV Women's Challenge Cup
  - (Turkey) Bursa BBSK defeated (Russia) Uralochka–NTMK Yekaterinburg, 3–4 in matches played and on aggregate, along with the 15–11 golden set score, to win their first CEV Women's Challenge Cup title.
- November 4, 2014 – April 11, 2015: 2014–15 Men's CEV Cup
  - (Russia) VC Dynamo Moscow defeated (Italy) Energy T.I. Diatec Trentino, 4–4 in matches played and on aggregate, with the 15–12 golden set score, to win their second Men's CEV Cup title.
- November 4, 2014 – April 12, 2015: 2014–15 CEV Challenge Cup
  - (Serbia) Vojvodina NS Seme Novi Sad defeated (Portugal) S.L. Benfica, 5–4 in matches played and on aggregate, to win their first CEV Challenge Cup title.
- November 11, 2014 – April 11, 2015: 2014–15 Women's CEV Cup
  - (Russia) Dinamo Krasnodar defeated (Poland) PGE Atom Trefl Sopot, 4–3 in matches played and on aggregate, with the 15–10 golden set score, to win their first Women's CEV Cup title.
- March 28 – April 5: 2015 Girls' Youth European Volleyball Championship in (Bulgaria) Samokov and Plovdiv
  - Russia defeated Serbia, 3–2 in matches played, to win their second Girls' Youth European Volleyball Championship title. Belgium took third place.
- April 4 – 12: 2015 Boys' Youth European Volleyball Championship in Kocaeli and Sakarya
  - Poland defeated Italy, 3–1 in matches played, to win their second Boys' Youth European Volleyball Championship title. Turkey took third place.
- September 26 – October 4: 2015 Women's European Volleyball Championship in the Netherlands and Belgium
  - Russia defeated the Netherlands, 3–0 in matches played, to win their 19th Women's European Volleyball Championship title. This includes all the wins from being part of the Soviet Union from 1949 to 1991. Serbia took third place.
- October 9 – 18: 2015 Men's European Volleyball Championship in Bulgaria and Italy
  - France defeated Slovenia, 3–0 in matches played, to win their first Men's European Volleyball Championship title. Italy took third place.

==== Confederación Sudamericana de Voleibol (CSV) ====
- February 4 – 8: 2015 Women's South American Volleyball Club Championship in (Brazil) São Paulo
  - (Brazil) Rexona Ades defeated fellow Brazilian team, Molico/Osasco, 3–1 in matches played, to win their second Women's South American Volleyball Club Championship title. (Peru) Universidad de San Martín de Porres took third place.
- February 11 – 15: 2015 Men's South American Volleyball Club Championship in (Argentina) San Juan
  - (Argentina) UPCN San Juan defeated (Brazil) Sada Cruzeiro, 3–2 in matches played, to win their second Men's South American Volleyball Club Championship title. (Argentina) Lomas took third place.
- September 24 – October 2: 2015 Women's South American Volleyball Championship in Cartagena
  - Brazil defeated Peru, 3–0 in matches played, to win their 19th Women's South American Volleyball Championship title. Colombia took third place.
- September 30 – October 4: 2015 Men's South American Volleyball Championship in Maceió
  - Brazil defeated Argentina, 3–0 in matches played, to win their 25th consecutive and 30th overall Men's South American Volleyball Championship title. Colombia took third place.
- October 18 – 26: 2015 Boys' U17 South American Volleyball Championship in (Colombia) Cali
  - Event cancelled.
- December 9 – 12: 2015 Girls' U16 South American Volleyball Championship in Tarapoto
  - Peru defeated Bolivia, 3–0 in matches played, to win their second consecutive Girls' U16 South American Volleyball Championship title. Chile took third place.

==== North, Central America and Caribbean Volleyball Confederation (NORCECA) ====
- May 5 – 10: 2015 NORCECA Girls' Youth U18 Volleyball Final Four in Lima
  - Argentina defeated the Dominican Republic, 3–2 in sets played, in the final. Peru took third place.
- May 21 – 23: 2015 NORCECA Men's Champions Cup (Final Four) in Detroit
  - Canada defeated the United States, with 13 points, to win their first NORCECA Men's Champions Cup title. Cuba took third place.
- June 5 – 7: 2015 NORCECA Women's Champions Cup (Final Four) in Havana
  - The Dominican Republic defeated Cuba, with 10 points, to win their first NORCECA Women's Champions Cup title. Puerto Rico took third place.
- October 5 – 10: 2015 Men's NORCECA Volleyball Championship in (Mexico) Córdoba, Veracruz
  - Canada defeated Cuba, 3–1 in matches played, to win their first Men's NORCECA Volleyball Championship title. Puerto Rico took third place.

==== Joint CSV & NORCECA events ====
- March 17 – 22: 2015 Girls' Youth Pan-American Volleyball Cup in Havana
  - Argentina defeated the Dominican Republic, 3–2 in matches played, to win their second Girls' Youth Pan-American Volleyball Cup title. Cuba took third place.
- April 17 – 25: 2015 Women's Junior Pan-American Volleyball Cup in Santo Domingo
  - The Dominican Republic defeated Argentina, 3–1 in matches played, to win their first Women's Junior Pan-American Volleyball Cup title. Chile took third place.
- June 13 – 21: 2015 Women's Pan-American Volleyball Cup in (Peru) Lima and Callao
  - The United States defeated the Dominican Republic, 3–0 in matches played, to win their fourth Women's Pan-American Volleyball Cup title. Argentina took third place.
- June 23 – 28: 2015 Men's Junior Pan-American Volleyball Cup in Gatineau
  - Brazil defeated the United States, 3–0 in matches played, to win their first Men's Junior Pan-American Volleyball Cup title. Canada took third place.
- August 12 – 17: 2015 Men's Pan-American Volleyball Cup in (United States) Reno, Nevada
  - Brazil defeated Argentina, 3–1 in matches played, to win their third Men's Pan-American Volleyball Cup title. Venezuela took third place.

==== Asian Volleyball Confederation (AVC) ====
- May 1 – 9: 2015 Asian Women's U23 Volleyball Championship in (Philippines) Pasig (debut event)
  - China defeated Thailand, 3–1 in matches played, to win the inaugural Asian U23 Women’s Volleyball Championship title. South Korea took third place.
- May 12 – 20: 2015 Asian Men's U23 Volleyball Championship in (Myanmar) Naypyidaw (debut event)
  - Iran defeated South Korea, 3–0 in matches played, to win the inaugural Asian U23 Men’s Volleyball Championship title. Chinese Taipei took third place.
- May 20 – 28: 2015 Asian Women's Volleyball Championship in Tianjin
  - China defeated South Korea, 3–0 in matches played, to win their 13th Asian Women's Volleyball Championship title. Thailand took third place.
- July 31 – August 8: 2015 Asian Men's Volleyball Championship in Tehran
  - Japan defeated Iran, 3–1 in matches played, to win their eighth Asian Men's Volleyball Championship title. China took third place.
- August 13 – 21: 2015 Asian Men's Club Volleyball Championship in (Chinese Taipei) Taipei
  - (Chinese Taipei) Taichung Bank VC defeated (Qatar) Al Arabi, 3–1 in matches played, to win their first Asian Men's Club Volleyball Championship title. (Iran) Paykan Tehran took third place.
- September 12 – 20: 2015 Asian Women's Club Volleyball Championship in (Vietnam) Hà Nam Province
  - Team (Thailand) Bangkok Glass defeated Team (Japan) Hisamitsu Springs, 3–2 in matches played, to win their first Asian Women's Club Volleyball Championship title. Team (China) Zhejiang took third place.

==== Volleyball World Cups ====
- August 22 – September 6: 2015 FIVB Volleyball Women's World Cup in Japan
  - Winner: China (10 wins and 30 points) (fourth FIVB Volleyball Women's World Cup title)
  - Second: Serbia (10 wins and 26 points)
  - Third: United States (9 wins and 28 points)

== Volleyball Hall of Fame ==
- Class of 2015:
  - Lloy Ball
  - Renan Dal Zotto
  - Fofão
  - Bebeto de Freitas
