= Guatemala women's national under-19 volleyball team =

Guatemala
- Association: Federación Guatemalteca de Voleibol
- Confederation: NORCECA
- Head coach: William Fernandez

Uniforms
Home

Youth Olympic Games
- Appearances: None

FIVB U19 World Championship
- Appearances: None

NORCECA U18 Championship
- Appearances: 7 (First in 1998)
- Best result: 4th place (2004)

The Guatemala women's national under-18 volleyball team represents Guatemala in women's under-18 volleyball Events, it is controlled and managed by the National Volleyball Federation of Guatemala that is a member of North American volleyball body North, Central America and Caribbean Volleyball Confederation (NORCECA) and the international volleyball body government the Fédération Internationale de Volleyball (FIVB).

== Results ==
=== Summer Youth Olympics ===
Champions Runners up Third place Fourth place

Youth Olympic Games
Year	Round	Position	Pld	W	L	SW	SL	Squad
(Singapore) 2010	Didn't Qualify							
(China) 2014	No Volleyball Event							
(Argentina) 2018	No Volleyball Event							
Total	0 Titles	0/1						

=== FIVB U18 World Championship ===
Champions Runners up Third place Fourth place

FIVB U18 World Championship
Year	Round	Position	Pld	W	L	SW	SL	Squad
(Brazil) 1989	Didn't Qualify							
(Portugal) 1991	Didn't Qualify							
(Czechoslovakia) 1993	Didn't Qualify							
(France) 1995	Didn't Qualify							
(Thailand) 1997	Didn't Qualify							
(Portugal) 1999	Didn't Qualify							
(Croatia) 2001	Didn't Qualify							
(Poland) 2003	Didn't Qualify							
(Macau) 2005	Didn't Qualify							
(Mexico) 2007	Didn't Qualify							
(Thailand) 2009	Didn't Qualify							
(Turkey) 2011	Didn't Qualify							
(Thailand) 2013	Didn't Qualify							
(Peru) 2015	Didn't Qualify							
(Argentina) 2017	Didn't Qualify							
(Egypt) 2019	Didn't Qualify							
Total	0 Titles	0/16						

=== NORCECA Girls' U18 Championship ===
Champions Runners up Third place Fourth place

NORCECA Girls' U18 Championship
Year	Round	Position	Pld	W	L	SW	SL	Squad
(Puerto Rico) 1998	Preliminary round	6th Place	2	0	2	0	6	Squad
(Dominican Republic) 2000	Preliminary round	6th Place	4	1	3	3	6	Squad
(United States) 2002	Didn't Enter							
(Puerto Rico) 2004	Preliminary round	4th Place	3	0	3	0	9	Squad
(United States) 2006	Didn't Enter							
(Puerto Rico) 2008	Didn't Qualify							
(Guatemala) 2010	Quarterfinals	6th Place	4	1	3	3	9	Squad
(Mexico) 2012	Quarterfinals	5th Place	5	2	3	6	11	Squad
(Costa Rica) 2014	Quarterfinals	6th Place	4	1	3	4	9	Squad
(Puerto Rico) 2016	Quarterfinals	6th Place	6	2	4	7	13	Squad
(Honduras) 2018	Didn't Enter							
Total	0 Titles	7/11						

=== Pan-American U18 Cup ===
Champions Runners up Third place Fourth place

Pan-American U18 Cup
Year	Round	Position	Pld	W	L	SW	SL	Squad
(Mexico) 2011	Didn't Enter							
(Guatemala) 2013	Preliminary Round	8th Place	4	0	4	0	15	Squad
(Cuba) 2015	Didn't Enter							
(Cuba) 2017	Preliminary Round	10th Place	5	0	5	4	15	Squad
(Mexico) 2019	Preliminary Round	7th place	5	1	4	3	12	Squad
Total	0 Titles	3/5						

== Team ==
=== Current squad ===
The following is the Cuban roster in the 2019 Girls' Youth Pan-American Volleyball Cup.

Head Coach: (Cuba) William Fernandez

No.	Name	Date of birth	Height	Weight	Spike	Block	2019 club
1	Laura Lopez	30 August 2002	1.74 m (5 ft 9 in)	56 kg (123 lb)	266 cm (105 in)	253 cm (100 in)	(Guatemala) Aguilas
2	Carolina Monterroso	29 September 2002	1.59 m (5 ft 3 in)	68 kg (150 lb)	247 cm (97 in)	227 cm (89 in)	(Guatemala) Aguilas
4	Frida Marroquin	23 April 2003	1.61 m (5 ft 3 in)	57 kg (126 lb)	267 cm (105 in)	249 cm (98 in)	(Guatemala) Sagrado
5	Maria Garcia	31 January 2003	1.72 m (5 ft 8 in)	64 kg (141 lb)	270 cm (110 in)	260 cm (100 in)	(Guatemala) Smarbrams
7	Anrea Alvarez	11 April 2003	1.59 m (5 ft 3 in)	55 kg (121 lb)	237 cm (93 in)	227 cm (89 in)	(Guatemala) Sagrado
8	Ivana Mondal	31 May 2003	1.77 m (5 ft 10 in)	60 kg (130 lb)	268 cm (106 in)	262 cm (103 in)	Guatemala
9	Ana Prado	29 January 2003	1.58 m (5 ft 2 in)	58 kg (128 lb)	229 cm (90 in)	223 cm (88 in)	(Guatemala) Sagrado
11	Marjorie Mejia	12 May 2002	1.66 m (5 ft 5 in)	60 kg (130 lb)	260 cm (100 in)	247 cm (97 in)	(Guatemala) Sagrado
12	Mariangel Arriola	6 January 2004	1.74 m (5 ft 9 in)	65 kg (143 lb)	260 cm (100 in)	253 cm (100 in)	Guatemala
13	Andrea Carballo	11 February 2003	1.65 m (5 ft 5 in)	55 kg (121 lb)	250 cm (98 in)	238 cm (94 in)	(Guatemala) Escuintla
14	Ingrid Pinto	23 May 2004	1.66 m (5 ft 5 in)	59 kg (130 lb)	246 cm (97 in)	235 cm (93 in)	(Guatemala) San Marcos
15	Diana David	23 March 2004	1.65 m (5 ft 5 in)	53 kg (117 lb)	246 cm (97 in)	242 cm (95 in)	(Guatemala) Sagrado
