= Chile women's national under-19 volleyball team =

Youth volleyball team representing Chile

Chile
- Association: Chilean Volleyball Federation
- Confederation: CSV

Uniforms
Home	Away

Youth Olympic Games
- Appearances: NO Appearances

FIVB U19 World Championship
- Appearances: NO Appearances

South America U18 Championship
- Appearances: 20 (First in 1978)
- Best result: 4th Place : (1980, 1984, 1994, 2010, 2012).

The Chile women's national under-18 volleyball team represents Chile in women's under-18 volleyball Events, it is controlled and managed by the Chilean Volleyball Federation that is a member of South American volleyball body Confederación Sudamericana de Voleibol (CSV) and the international volleyball body government the Fédération Internationale de Volleyball (FIVB).

== Results ==
=== Summer Youth Olympics ===
Champions Runners up Third place Fourth place

Youth Olympic Games
Year	Round	Position	Pld	W	L	SW	SL	Squad
(Singapore) 2010	Didn't qualify							
(China) 2014	No Volleyball Event							
(Argentina) 2018	No Volleyball Event							
Total	0 Titles	0/1						

=== FIVB U19 World Championship ===
Champions Runners up Third place Fourth place

FIVB U19 World Championship
Year	Round	Position	Pld	W	L	SW	SL	Squad
(Brazil) 1989	Didn't qualify							
(Portugal) 1991	Didn't qualify							
(Czechoslovakia) 1993	Didn't qualify							
(France) 1995	Didn't qualify							
(Thailand) 1997	Didn't qualify							
(Portugal) 1999	Didn't qualify							
(Croatia) 2001	Didn't qualify							
(Poland) 2003	Didn't qualify							
(Macau) 2005	Didn't qualify							
(Mexico) 2007	Didn't qualify							
(Thailand) 2009	Didn't qualify							
(Turkey) 2011	Didn't qualify							
(Thailand) 2013	Didn't qualify							
(Peru) 2015	Didn't qualify							
(Argentina) 2017	Didn't qualify							
(Egypt) 2019	Didn't qualify							
(Mexico) 2021	Didn't qualify							
(Croatia) / (Hungary) 2023		23 th Place						Squad
Total	0 Titles	1/18						

=== South America U18 Championship ===
Champions Runners up Third place Fourth place

South America U18 Championship
Year	Round	Position	Pld	W	L	SW	SL	Squad
(Argentina) 1978		7th place						Squad
(Brazil) 1980		4th place						Squad
(Paraguay) 1982		5th place						Squad
(Chile) 1984		4th place						Squad
(Peru) 1986		6th place						Squad
(Argentina) 1988		5th place						Squad
(Bolivia) 1990		7th place						Squad
(Venezuela) 1992		6th place						Squad
(Peru) 1994		4th place						Squad
(Uruguay) 1996		7th place						Squad
(Bolivia) 1998		6th place						Squad
(Venezuela) 2000	Didn't Enter							
(Venezuela) 2002		6th place						Squad
(Ecuador) 2004		5th place						Squad

South America U18 Championship
Year	Round	Position	Pld	W	L	SW	SL	Squad
(Peru) 2006		5th place						Squad
(Peru) 2008		7th place						Squad
(Peru) 2010		4th place						Squad
(Peru) 2012		4th place						Squad
(Peru) 2014		5th place						Squad
(Peru) 2016		5th place						Squad
(Peru) 2018		5th place						Squad
Total	0 Titles	20/21						

=== Pan-American U18 Cup ===
Champions Runners up Third place Fourth place

Pan-American U18 Cup
Year	Round	Position	Pld	W	L	SW	SL	Squad
(Mexico) 2011		6th place						Squad
(Guatemala) 2013		5th place						Squad
(Cuba) 2015		7th place						Squad
(Cuba) 2017		6th place						Squad
(Mexico) 2019		4th place						Squad
Total	0 Titles	5/5						

== Team ==
=== Current squad ===
The following is the Chilean roster in the 2019 Girls' Youth Pan-American Volleyball Cup.

Head Coach: (Argentina) Eduardo Guillaume

No.	Name	Date of birth	Height	Weight	Spike	Block	2019 club
1	Colomba Gonzalez	9 June 2003	1.815 m (5 ft 11 in)	73 kg (161 lb)	295 cm (116 in)	275 cm (108 in)	(Chile) IMV Puente Alto
3	Coristanza Ramirez	12 May 2005	1.65 m (5 ft 5 in)	52 kg (115 lb)	266 cm (105 in)	255 cm (100 in)	(United States) Boston College
4	Rafaela Rozas	16 October 2004	1.57 m (5 ft 2 in)	51 kg (112 lb)	265 cm (104 in)	242 cm (95 in)	(Chile) Murano
6	Constanza Leiva	19 February 2002	1.785 m (5 ft 10 in)	73 kg (161 lb)	300 cm (120 in)	280 cm (110 in)	(Chile) Manquehue
7	Isabella Morono	12 February 2002	1.8 m (5 ft 11 in)	74 kg (163 lb)	295 cm (116 in)	280 cm (110 in)	(Chile) Aleman de Concepcion
8	Maria Munoz	29 January 2002	1.72 m (5 ft 8 in)	76 kg (168 lb)	300 cm (120 in)	278 cm (109 in)	(Chile) Manquehue
9	Elisa Cox	25 March 2002	1.785 m (5 ft 10 in)	63 kg (139 lb)	300 cm (120 in)	280 cm (110 in)	(Chile) Manquehue
10	Daniela Contreras	3 November 2004	1.64 m (5 ft 5 in)	61 kg (134 lb)	272 cm (107 in)	263 cm (104 in)	(United States) Boston College
12	Gabriela Morales	3 February 2003	1.74 m (5 ft 9 in)	74 kg (163 lb)	284 cm (112 in)	270 cm (110 in)	(Chile) San Felipe
13	Ana Busquets	21 June 2004	1.78 m (5 ft 10 in)	66 kg (146 lb)	291 cm (115 in)	269 cm (106 in)	(Chile) Arica
16	Antonia Espinoza	14 February 2003	1.56 m (5 ft 1 in)	63 kg (139 lb)	271 cm (107 in)	264 cm (104 in)	(Chile) Manquehue
17	Rosario Moller	27 October 2004	1.79 m (5 ft 10 in)	65 kg (143 lb)	286 cm (113 in)	271 cm (107 in)	(Chile) Aleman de Concepcion
