= 2015 Girls' Youth Pan-American Volleyball Cup squads =

This article show all participating team squads at the 2015 Girls' Youth Pan-American Volleyball Cup, played by sixteen countries with the final round held in Cuba

== Pool A ==
=== Dominican Republic ===
The following is the Dominican roster in the 2015 Girls' Youth Pan-American Volleyball Cup.

Head Coach: (Brazil) Alexandre Ceccato

| No. | Name | Date of birth | Height | Weight | Spike | Block | 2015 club |
|---|---|---|---|---|---|---|---|
| 2 | Madeline Guillen | 4 June 2001 | 1.86 m (6 ft 1 in) | 68 kg (150 lb) | 273 cm (107 in) | 242 cm (95 in) | (Dominican Republic) Malanga |
| 4 | Vielka Peralta | 13 April 1999 | 1.76 m (5 ft 9 in) | 56 kg (123 lb) | 275 cm (108 in) | 242 cm (95 in) | (Dominican Republic) Deportivo Nacional |
| 5 | Pamela Jorge | 26 November 1998 | 1.68 m (5 ft 6 in) | 61 kg (134 lb) | 262 cm (103 in) | 253 cm (100 in) | (Dominican Republic) Deportivo Nacional |
| 6 | Yemari Reyes | 23 August 1998 | 1.60 m (5 ft 3 in) | 68 kg (150 lb) | 240 cm (94 in) | 234 cm (92 in) | (Dominican Republic) Deportivo Nacional |
| 8 | Natalia Martínez | 25 November 2000 | 1.86 m (6 ft 1 in) | 71 kg (157 lb) | 300 cm (120 in) | 275 cm (108 in) | (Dominican Republic) Mirador |
| 12 | Hennesys Lalane | 10 April 2000 | 1.85 m (6 ft 1 in) | 70 kg (150 lb) | 270 cm (110 in) | 238 cm (94 in) | (Dominican Republic) Deportivo Nacional |
| 13 | Massiel Matos | 16 April 1998 | 1.88 m (6 ft 2 in) | 67 kg (148 lb) | 300 cm (120 in) | 292 cm (115 in) | (Dominican Republic) Mirador |
| 14 | Yokaty Pérez (C) | 6 August 1998 | 1.78 m (5 ft 10 in) | 71 kg (157 lb) | 291 cm (115 in) | 257 cm (101 in) | (Dominican Republic) Los Cachorros |
| 15 | Gabriela Hernández | 16 January 1998 | 1.84 m (6 ft 0 in) | 61 kg (134 lb) | 272 cm (107 in) | 240 cm (94 in) | (Dominican Republic) Deportivo Nacional |
| 16 | Geraldine González | 18 April 2002 | 1.93 m (6 ft 4 in) | 71 kg (157 lb) | 273 cm (107 in) | 245 cm (96 in) | (Dominican Republic) Deportivo Nacional |
| 18 | Yanibel Alcántara | 6 November 1998 | 1.80 m (5 ft 11 in) | 65 kg (143 lb) | 290 cm (110 in) | 263 cm (104 in) | (Dominican Republic) Mirador |
| 19 | Lisbeth Rosario | 26 May 1999 | 1.86 m (6 ft 1 in) | 61 kg (134 lb) | 297 cm (117 in) | 285 cm (112 in) | (Dominican Republic) Deportivo Nacional |

=== Argentina ===
The following is the Argentinean roster in the 2015 Girls' Youth Pan-American Volleyball Cup.

Head Coach: (Argentina) Mauro Silvestre

| No. | Name | Date of birth | Height | Weight | Spike | Block | 2015 club |
|---|---|---|---|---|---|---|---|
| 1 | Valentina Gonzalez | 23 February 1998 | 1.63 m (5 ft 4 in) | 56 kg (123 lb) | 271 cm (107 in) | 260 cm (100 in) | (Argentina) 9 De Julio - Freyre |
| 4 | Araceli Meinardi | 22 October 1999 | 1.72 m (5 ft 8 in) | 60 kg (130 lb) | 280 cm (110 in) | 271 cm (107 in) | (Argentina) Central San Carlos |
| 5 | Fiamma Biain | 30 January 1998 | 1.71 m (5 ft 7 in) | 67 kg (148 lb) | 279 cm (110 in) | 266 cm (105 in) | (Argentina) Union San Guillermo |
| 6 | Candela Salinas | 23 May 2000 | 1.83 m (6 ft 0 in) | 64 kg (141 lb) | 278 cm (109 in) | 265 cm (104 in) | (Argentina) Boca Juniors |
| 7 | Azul Benítez (C) | 5 February 1998 | 1.67 m (5 ft 6 in) | 57 kg (126 lb) | 272 cm (107 in) | 263 cm (104 in) | (Argentina) Mar Chiquita |
| 8 | Brenda Churin | 17 February 2000 | 1.73 m (5 ft 8 in) | 64 kg (141 lb) | 286 cm (113 in) | 278 cm (109 in) | (Argentina) Universidad la Plata |
| 9 | Anahi Tosi | 10 July 1998 | 1.81 m (5 ft 11 in) | 60 kg (130 lb) | 290 cm (110 in) | 272 cm (107 in) | (Argentina) 9 De Julio - Freyre |
| 10 | Candela Nota | 1 March 1999 | 1.82 m (6 ft 0 in) | 60 kg (130 lb) | 280 cm (110 in) | 271 cm (107 in) | (Argentina) Union San Guillermo |
| 11 | Maria Corbalan | 7 November 1998 | 1.75 m (5 ft 9 in) | 60 kg (130 lb) | 283 cm (111 in) | 275 cm (108 in) | (Argentina) Fundarte |
| 13 | Sabrina Germanier | 7 June 1999 | 1.75 m (5 ft 9 in) | 65 kg (143 lb) | 276 cm (109 in) | 269 cm (106 in) | (Argentina) Social Y Dep. San Jose |
| 14 | Agostina Beltramino | 25 April 1999 | 1.80 m (5 ft 11 in) | 65 kg (143 lb) | 283 cm (111 in) | 283 cm (111 in) | (Argentina) Provincial - Rosario |
| 15 | Melisa Corzo | 1 May 2000 | 1.80 m (5 ft 11 in) | 64 kg (141 lb) | 283 cm (111 in) | 274 cm (108 in) | (Argentina) 9 De Julio - Freyre |

=== Peru ===
The following is the Peruvian roster in the 2015 Girls' Youth Pan-American Volleyball Cup.

Head Coach: (Spain) Juan Diego García

| No. | Name | Date of birth | Height | Weight | Spike | Block | 2015 club |
|---|---|---|---|---|---|---|---|
| 2 | Saray Gutiérrez | 30 August 1998 | 1.87 m (6 ft 2 in) | 79 kg (174 lb) | 289 cm (114 in) | 279 cm (110 in) | (Peru) Divino Maestro |
| 3 | Katherine Regalado | 11 March 1998 | 1.87 m (6 ft 2 in) | 66 kg (146 lb) | 291 cm (115 in) | 284 cm (112 in) | (Peru) Alianza Lima |
| 4 | Nicole Abreu (C) | 27 March 1999 | 1.80 m (5 ft 11 in) | 63 kg (139 lb) | 285 cm (112 in) | 270 cm (110 in) | (Peru) Universidad César Vallejo |
| 5 | Valentina Carrasco | 20 July 1998 | 1.68 m (5 ft 6 in) | 61 kg (134 lb) | 253 cm (100 in) | 270 cm (110 in) | (Peru) Universidad San Martín |
| 6 | Maricarmen Guerrero | 17 January 1999 | 1.80 m (5 ft 11 in) | 70 kg (150 lb) | 290 cm (110 in) | 280 cm (110 in) | (Peru) Túpac Amaru |
| 7 | Diana Magallanes | 9 January 1998 | 1.77 m (5 ft 10 in) | 70 kg (150 lb) | 278 cm (109 in) | 273 cm (107 in) | (Peru) Sporting Cristal |
| 9 | Xiomeli Valencia | 20 May 1998 | 1.75 m (5 ft 9 in) | 73 kg (161 lb) | 280 cm (110 in) | 296 cm (117 in) | (Peru) Túpac Amaru |
| 10 | Maria Castillo | 6 March 1999 | 1.72 m (5 ft 8 in) | 68 kg (150 lb) | 268 cm (106 in) | 274 cm (108 in) | (Peru) Túpac Amaru |
| 12 | Leslie Leyva | 6 December 1998 | 1.75 m (5 ft 9 in) | 72 kg (159 lb) | 280 cm (110 in) | 300 cm (120 in) | (Peru) Universidad San Martín |
| 14 | Diana De la Peña | 7 June 1999 | 1.87 m (6 ft 2 in) | 60 kg (130 lb) | 294 cm (116 in) | 295 cm (116 in) | (Peru) Géminis |
| 15 | Reyshel Zea | 24 April 1998 | 1.77 m (5 ft 10 in) | 63 kg (139 lb) | 278 cm (109 in) | 290 cm (110 in) | (Peru) Géminis |
| 19 | Ysabella Sánchez | 2 July 1999 | 1.77 m (5 ft 10 in) | 59 kg (130 lb) | 279 cm (110 in) | 296 cm (117 in) | (Peru) Géminis |

=== Mexico ===
The following is the Mexican roster in the 2015 Girls' Youth Pan-American Volleyball Cup.

Head Coach: (Cuba) Ricardo Naranjo

| No. | Name | Date of birth | Height | Weight | Spike | Block | 2015 club |
|---|---|---|---|---|---|---|---|
| 3 | Alejandra Salinas | 4 April 1998 | 1.64 m (5 ft 5 in) | 58 kg (128 lb) | 255 cm (100 in) | 235 cm (93 in) | (Mexico) Nuevo Leon |
| 5 | Marla Arreola | 18 July 1999 | 1.61 m (5 ft 3 in) | 59 kg (130 lb) | 250 cm (98 in) | 230 cm (91 in) | (Mexico) Baja California |
| 6 | Karla Mireles | 25 January 2000 | 1.78 m (5 ft 10 in) | 60 kg (130 lb) | 270 cm (110 in) | 250 cm (98 in) | (Mexico) Nuevo Leon |
| 8 | Sirenia Gómez | 24 May 1999 | 1.79 m (5 ft 10 in) | 78 kg (172 lb) | 282 cm (111 in) | 271 cm (107 in) | (Mexico) Nuevo Leon |
| 9 | Kathya Garcia | 6 March 1998 | 1.75 m (5 ft 9 in) | 68 kg (150 lb) | 286 cm (113 in) | 275 cm (108 in) | (Mexico) Chihuahua |
| 10 | Daniela Sillier | 25 March 2000 | 1.75 m (5 ft 9 in) | 60 kg (130 lb) | 255 cm (100 in) | 243 cm (96 in) | (Mexico) Nuevo Leon |
| 11 | Abely Rodríguez | 14 August 1998 | 1.75 m (5 ft 9 in) | 62 kg (137 lb) | 286 cm (113 in) | 255 cm (100 in) | (Mexico) Nuevo Leon |
| 12 | Andrea Najera | 2 November 1999 | 1.72 m (5 ft 8 in) | 60 kg (130 lb) | 280 cm (110 in) | 235 cm (93 in) | (Mexico) Nuevo Leon |
| 16 | Angela Muñoz | 10 November 2000 | 1.78 m (5 ft 10 in) | 50 kg (110 lb) | 260 cm (100 in) | 247 cm (97 in) | (Mexico) Nuevo Leon |
| 17 | Karina Flores (C) | 16 August 1998 | 1.88 m (6 ft 2 in) | 72 kg (159 lb) | 293 cm (115 in) | 288 cm (113 in) | (Mexico) Nuevo Leon |
| 18 | Alondra Amaro | 9 June 1998 | 1.88 m (6 ft 2 in) | 69 kg (152 lb) | 275 cm (108 in) | 250 cm (98 in) | (Mexico) Durango |
| 20 | Gabriela Pérez | 17 May 1998 | 1.82 m (6 ft 0 in) | 75 kg (165 lb) | 284 cm (112 in) | 279 cm (110 in) | (Mexico) D.F. |

== Pool B ==
=== Cuba ===
The following is the Cuban roster in the 2015 Girls' Youth Pan-American Volleyball Cup.

Head Coach: (Cuba) Tomas Fernandez

| No. | Name | Date of birth | Height | Weight | Spike | Block | 2015 club |
|---|---|---|---|---|---|---|---|
| 3 | Diaris Perez | 16 November 1998 | 1.82 m (6 ft 0 in) | 75 kg (165 lb) | 304 cm (120 in) | 295 cm (116 in) | (Cuba) Havana |
| 5 | Heidy Casanova | 6 November 1998 | 1.84 m (6 ft 0 in) | 78 kg (172 lb) | 244 cm (96 in) | 240 cm (94 in) | (Cuba) Havana |
| 6 | Ana C. Fernández | 8 March 1999 | 1.60 m (5 ft 3 in) | 60 kg (130 lb) | 290 cm (110 in) | 280 cm (110 in) | (Cuba) Havana |
| 7 | Dalila Palma | 18 November 1999 | 1.82 m (6 ft 0 in) | 62 kg (137 lb) | 301 cm (119 in) | 285 cm (112 in) | (Cuba) Cienfuegos |
| 8 | Jessica Aguilera | 25 May 1999 | 1.84 m (6 ft 0 in) | 68 kg (150 lb) | 311 cm (122 in) | 302 cm (119 in) | (Cuba) Havana |
| 9 | Ailama Cese | 29 October 2000 | 1.88 m (6 ft 2 in) | 58 kg (128 lb) | 322 cm (127 in) | 308 cm (121 in) | (Cuba) Mayabeque |
| 10 | Kitania Medina | 24 February 1999 | 1.86 m (6 ft 1 in) | 77 kg (170 lb) | 308 cm (121 in) | 295 cm (116 in) | (Cuba) Havana |
| 11 | Gretell Moreno | 30 January 1998 | 1.83 m (6 ft 0 in) | 68 kg (150 lb) | 287 cm (113 in) | 280 cm (110 in) | (Cuba) Granma |
| 13 | Liset Herrera | 6 December 1998 | 1.92 m (6 ft 4 in) | 70 kg (150 lb) | 311 cm (122 in) | 300 cm (120 in) | (Cuba) Matanzas |
| 15 | Carmela Massip | 17 January 1998 | 1.81 m (5 ft 11 in) | 65 kg (143 lb) | 304 cm (120 in) | 295 cm (116 in) | (Cuba) Sancti Spiritus |
| 16 | Aidachi Aguero (C) | 19 March 1999 | 1.77 m (5 ft 10 in) | 69 kg (152 lb) | 304 cm (120 in) | 295 cm (116 in) | (Cuba) Camaguey |
| 17 | Laura Suarez | 13 December 1999 | 1.85 m (6 ft 1 in) | 75 kg (165 lb) | 304 cm (120 in) | 292 cm (115 in) | (Cuba) Pinar Del Río |

=== Puerto Rico ===
The following is the Puerto Rican roster in the 2015 Girls' Youth Pan-American Volleyball Cup.

Head Coach: (Puerto Rico) Luis Aponte

| No. | Name | Date of birth | Height | Weight | Spike | Block | 2015 club |
|---|---|---|---|---|---|---|---|
| 1 | Ivania Ortiz | 15 July 1999 | 1.75 m (5 ft 9 in) | 78 kg (172 lb) | 244 cm (96 in) | 235 cm (93 in) | (Puerto Rico) National Team |
| 2 | Gabriela Ramos | 10 September 1998 | 1.82 m (6 ft 0 in) | 68 kg (150 lb) | 243 cm (96 in) | 239 cm (94 in) | (Puerto Rico) National Team |
| 3 | Valeria Santos | 23 April 1998 | 1.78 m (5 ft 10 in) | 65 kg (143 lb) | 256 cm (101 in) | 248 cm (98 in) | (Puerto Rico) National Team |
| 4 | Dariana Hollingsworth | 17 June 1999 | 1.76 m (5 ft 9 in) | 69 kg (152 lb) | 236 cm (93 in) | 231 cm (91 in) | (Puerto Rico) National Team |
| 6 | Adeannette Ramos | 8 September 1999 | 1.78 m (5 ft 10 in) | 67 kg (148 lb) | 242 cm (95 in) | 237 cm (93 in) | (Puerto Rico) National Team |
| 7 | Paola Salas | 10 November 1998 | 1.75 m (5 ft 9 in) | 68 kg (150 lb) | 245 cm (96 in) | 239 cm (94 in) | (Puerto Rico) National Team |
| 8 | Andrea Fuentes | 12 May 1999 | 1.85 m (6 ft 1 in) | 68 kg (150 lb) | 256 cm (101 in) | 249 cm (98 in) | (Puerto Rico) National Team |
| 9 | Joscelyn Coronel (C) | 2 January 1998 | 1.85 m (6 ft 1 in) | 63 kg (139 lb) | 302 cm (119 in) | 297 cm (117 in) | (Puerto Rico) National Team |
| 10 | Rhaiza Bermudez | 11 April 1999 | 1.81 m (5 ft 11 in) | 64 kg (141 lb) | 246 cm (97 in) | 242 cm (95 in) | (Puerto Rico) National Team |
| 11 | Natalia Peta | 5 April 1998 | 1.85 m (6 ft 1 in) | 64 kg (141 lb) | 242 cm (95 in) | 238 cm (94 in) | (Puerto Rico) National Team |
| 13 | Kris Justiniano | 12 May 1999 | 1.75 m (5 ft 9 in) | 58 kg (128 lb) | 242 cm (95 in) | 236 cm (93 in) | (Puerto Rico) National Team |
| 14 | Andrea Serra | 14 September 1999 | 1.76 m (5 ft 9 in) | 57 kg (126 lb) | 249 cm (98 in) | 242 cm (95 in) | (Puerto Rico) National Team |

=== Chile ===
The following is the Chilean roster in the 2015 Girls' Youth Pan-American Volleyball Cup.

Head Coach: (Chile) Hugo Jauregui

| No. | Name | Date of birth | Height | Weight | Spike | Block | 2015 club |
|---|---|---|---|---|---|---|---|
| 1 | Pilar Allendes | 11 March 1998 | 1.66 m (5 ft 5 in) | 61 kg (134 lb) | 272 cm (107 in) | 247 cm (97 in) | (Chile) Oscar Castro |
| 2 | Catalina Reyes (C) | 14 March 1998 | 1.76 m (5 ft 9 in) | 74 kg (163 lb) | 280 cm (110 in) | 260 cm (100 in) | (Chile) Providencia |
| 3 | Amalia Carvajal | 25 January 1998 | 1.81 m (5 ft 11 in) | 67 kg (148 lb) | 282 cm (111 in) | 262 cm (103 in) | (Chile) Manquehue |
| 4 | Josefa Martí | 16 October 1998 | 1.79 m (5 ft 10 in) | 69 kg (152 lb) | 284 cm (112 in) | 267 cm (105 in) | (Chile) Boston College |
| 5 | Victoria Hamann | 28 January 1998 | 1.82 m (6 ft 0 in) | 71 kg (157 lb) | 281 cm (111 in) | 268 cm (106 in) | (Chile) Manquehue |
| 6 | Karen Morales | 10 September 1998 | 1.86 m (6 ft 1 in) | 76 kg (168 lb) | 290 cm (110 in) | 276 cm (109 in) | (Chile) Boston College |
| 7 | Catalina Agurto | 27 November 1998 | 1.73 m (5 ft 8 in) | 61 kg (134 lb) | 286 cm (113 in) | 266 cm (105 in) | (Chile) Manquehue |
| 8 | Mikaella Brendel | 27 March 1999 | 1.81 m (5 ft 11 in) | 78 kg (172 lb) | 282 cm (111 in) | 270 cm (110 in) | (Chile) Manquehue |
| 9 | Dominique Vorpahl | 23 April 1998 | 1.77 m (5 ft 10 in) | 66 kg (146 lb) | 281 cm (111 in) | 262 cm (103 in) | (Chile) Boston College |
| 10 | Antonia Achondo | 5 October 1999 | 1.72 m (5 ft 8 in) | 67 kg (148 lb) | 275 cm (108 in) | 257 cm (101 in) | (Chile) Manquehue |
| 11 | Magdalena Ramírez | 9 February 1998 | 1.77 m (5 ft 10 in) | 71 kg (157 lb) | 280 cm (110 in) | 260 cm (100 in) | (Chile) Manquehue |
| 12 | Camila Gómez | 17 September 1999 | 1.72 m (5 ft 8 in) | 60 kg (130 lb) | 276 cm (109 in) | 258 cm (102 in) | (Chile) Manquehue |

=== Costa Rica ===
The following is the Costa Rican roster in the 2015 Girls' Youth Pan-American Volleyball Cup.

Head Coach: (Costa Rica) Andres Lopez Castro

| No. | Name | Date of birth | Height | Weight | Spike | Block | 2015 club |
|---|---|---|---|---|---|---|---|
| 5 | Tamara Espinoza | 15 January 2000 | 1.69 m (5 ft 7 in) | 60 kg (130 lb) | 252 cm (99 in) | 241 cm (95 in) | (Costa Rica) Atenas |
| 6 | Mariana Solis | 3 October 2000 | 1.72 m (5 ft 8 in) | 56 kg (123 lb) | 247 cm (97 in) | 237 cm (93 in) | (Costa Rica) Santa Barbara |
| 8 | Maria Jose Castro | 2 August 2001 | 1.59 m (5 ft 3 in) | 63 kg (139 lb) | 231 cm (91 in) | 225 cm (89 in) | (Costa Rica) San Carlos |
| 9 | Valeria Monge | 1 February 1998 | 1.63 m (5 ft 4 in) | 60 kg (130 lb) | 248 cm (98 in) | 241 cm (95 in) | (Costa Rica) Cartago |
| 10 | Daniela Monge | 15 March 2001 | 1.69 m (5 ft 7 in) | 55 kg (121 lb) | 249 cm (98 in) | 241 cm (95 in) | (Costa Rica) Cartago |
| 11 | Mariana Rodriguez (C) | 6 November 1999 | 1.78 m (5 ft 10 in) | 66 kg (146 lb) | 270 cm (110 in) | 262 cm (103 in) | (Costa Rica) Santa Barbara |
| 14 | Allison Font | 4 July 1998 | 1.77 m (5 ft 10 in) | 65 kg (143 lb) | 270 cm (110 in) | 262 cm (103 in) | (Costa Rica) Santa Barbara |
| 15 | Isayana Soto | 16 May 2000 | 1.73 m (5 ft 8 in) | 70 kg (150 lb) | 260 cm (100 in) | 254 cm (100 in) | (Costa Rica) San Carlos |
| 16 | Gianina Obando | 30 March 1998 | 1.81 m (5 ft 11 in) | 60 kg (130 lb) | 262 cm (103 in) | 250 cm (98 in) | (Costa Rica) Alajuela |
| 17 | Irene Solano | 17 March 1998 | 1.69 m (5 ft 7 in) | 61 kg (134 lb) | 262 cm (103 in) | 250 cm (98 in) | (Costa Rica) Grecia |
| 21 | Shamila Cubillo | 21 April 1999 | 1.74 m (5 ft 9 in) | 64 kg (141 lb) | 264 cm (104 in) | 256 cm (101 in) | (Costa Rica) Limon |
| 25 | Isla Johnson | 22 February 2000 | 1.74 m (5 ft 9 in) | 75 kg (165 lb) | 255 cm (100 in) | 244 cm (96 in) | (Costa Rica) Turrialba |
