= Argentina women's national under-19 volleyball team =

Youth volleyball team representing Argentina

Argentina
- Association: Federación del Voleibol Argentino
- Confederation: CSV

Uniforms
Home	Away

Youth Olympic Games
- Appearances: None

FIVB U19 World Championship
- Appearances: 10 (First in 1989)
- Best result: 7th place : (1991, 2017)

South America U18 Championship
- Appearances: 19 (First in 1978)
- Best result: (gold) Gold : (1996).

The Argentina women's national under-18 volleyball team represents Argentina in women's under-18 volleyball events, it is controlled and managed by the Argentine Volleyball Federation that is a member of South American volleyball body Confederación Sudamericana de Voleibol (CSV) and the international volleyball body government the Fédération Internationale de Volleyball (FIVB).

== Results ==
=== Summer Youth Olympics ===
Champions Runners up Third place Fourth place

Youth Olympic Games
Year	Round	Position	Pld	W	L	SW	SL	Squad
(Singapore) 2010	Didn't Qualify							
(China) 2014	No Volleyball Event							
(Argentina) 2018	No Volleyball Event							
Total	0 Titles	0/1						

=== FIVB U18 World Championship ===
Champions Runners up Third place Fourth place

FIVB U18 World Championship
Year	Round	Position	Pld	W	L	SW	SL	Squad
(Brazil) 1989		9th place						Squad
(Portugal) 1991		7th place						Squad
(Czechoslovakia) 1993	Didn't Qualify							
(France) 1995	Didn't Qualify							
(Thailand) 1997		9th place						Squad
(Portugal) 1999		13th place						Squad
(Croatia) 2001		9th place						Squad
(Poland) 2003	Didn't Qualify							
(Macau) 2005		8th place						Squad
(Mexico) 2007	Didn't Qualify							
(Thailand) 2009	Didn't Qualify							
(Turkey) 2011		8th place						Squad
(Thailand) 2013		17th place						Squad
(Peru) 2015		10th place						Squad
(Argentina) 2017		7th place						Squad
(Egypt) 2019		12th place						Squad
(Mexico) 2021		9th place						Squad
Total	0 Titles	12/17						

=== South America U18 Championship ===
Champions Runners up Third place Fourth place

South America U18 Championship
Year	Round	Position	Pld	W	L	SW	SL	Squad
(Argentina) 1978	Semifinals	Third place						Squad
(Brazil) 1980	Semifinals	Third place						Squad
(Paraguay) 1982	Semifinals	Third place						Squad
(Chile) 1984	Semifinals	Third place						Squad
(Peru) 1986	Semifinals	Third place						Squad
(Argentina) 1988	Semifinals	Third place						Squad
(Bolivia) 1990	Final	Runners-Up						Squad
(Venezuela) 1992	Final	Runners-Up						Squad
(Peru) 1994	Didn't Enter							
(Uruguay) 1996	Final	1st place						Squad
(Bolivia) 1998	Final	Runners-Up						Squad
(Venezuela) 2000	Final	Runners-Up						Squad
(Venezuela) 2002	Final	Runners-Up						Squad
(Ecuador) 2004	Final	Runners-Up						Squad

South America U18 Championship
Year	Round	Position	Pld	W	L	SW	SL	Squad
(Peru) 2006	Semifinals	Third place						Squad
(Peru) 2008	Semifinals	4th place						Squad
(Peru) 2010	Final	Runners-Up						Squad
(Peru) 2012	Semifinals	Third place						Squad
(Peru) 2014	Final	Runners-Up						Squad
(Peru) 2016	Semifinals	Third place						Squad
Total	1 Title	19/20						

=== Pan-American U18 Cup ===
Champions Runners up Third place Fourth place

Pan-American U18 Cup
Year	Round	Position	Pld	W	L	SW	SL	Squad
(Mexico) 2011	Final	1st place						Squad
(Guatemala) 2013	Semifinals	4th place						Squad
(Cuba) 2015	Final	1st place						Squad
(Cuba) 2017	Semifinals	4th place						Squad
Total	2 Titles	4/4						

== Team ==
=== Current squad ===
The following is the Argentine roster in the 2017 FIVB Girls' U18 World Championship.

Head coach: Estanislao Vachino

No.	Name	Date of birth	Height	Weight	Spike	Block	2017 club
1	Pilar Cina	1 November 2000	1.76 m (5 ft 9 in)	58 kg (128 lb)	277 cm (109 in)	266 cm (105 in)	Banco Provincial
2	Victoria Mayer	19 June 2001	1.80 m (5 ft 11 in)	59 kg (130 lb)	285 cm (112 in)	265 cm (104 in)	Regatas – Santa Fe
4	Rocio Navarro	23 December 2000	1.84 m (6 ft 0 in)	67 kg (148 lb)	285 cm (112 in)	270 cm (110 in)	Argentino – Marcos Juarez
5	Candela Sol Salinas	23 May 2000	1.83 m (6 ft 0 in)	64 kg (141 lb)	278 cm (109 in)	265 cm (104 in)	Boca Juniors
7	Angeles Ligorria	24 January 2000	1.8 m (5 ft 11 in)	68 kg (150 lb)	290 cm (110 in)	270 cm (110 in)	Atenas – Córdoba
8	Guadalupe Martin	23 March 2002	1.81 m (5 ft 11 in)	72 kg (159 lb)	288 cm (113 in)	273 cm (107 in)	Universidad – San Juan
10	Sofia Meinardi	22 November 2001	1.75 m (5 ft 9 in)	70 kg (150 lb)	287 cm (113 in)	270 cm (110 in)	Central San Carlos
11	Bianca Farriol	18 December 2001	1.80 m (5 ft 11 in)	68 kg (150 lb)	290 cm (110 in)	270 cm (110 in)	Universidad La Matanza
14	Melisa Gabriela Corzo	5 January 2000	1.80 m (5 ft 11 in)	64 kg (141 lb)	283 cm (111 in)	274 cm (108 in)	9 DE JULIO – FREYRE
15	Zoe Gomez	19 September 2000	1.60 m (5 ft 3 in)	52 kg (115 lb)	290 cm (110 in)	270 cm (110 in)	Circulo Policial – Mza
17	Dominique Corsaro	8 June 2001	1.84 m (6 ft 0 in)	80 kg (180 lb)	290 cm (110 in)	273 cm (107 in)	Boca Juniors
19	Yuliana Pacheco	21 July 2001	1.96 m (6 ft 5 in)	72 kg (159 lb)	290 cm (110 in)	270 cm (110 in)	Parque Velez Sarsfield – Cba
