= Peru women's national under-19 volleyball team =

Peru
- Association: Peruvian Volleyball Federation
- Confederation: CSV

Uniforms
Home	Away

Youth Olympic Games
- Appearances: 1 (First in 2010)
- Best result: (bronze) Bronze : (2010)

FIVB U19 World Championship
- Appearances: 9 (First in 1989)
- Best result: 4th place : (1993, 2013)

South America U18 Championship
- Appearances: 21 (First in 1978)
- Best result: (gold) Gold : (1978, 1980, 2012).

The Peru women's national under-18 volleyball team represents Peru in women's under-18 volleyball events, it is controlled and managed by the Peruvian Volleyball Federation that is a member of South American volleyball body Confederación Sudamericana de Voleibol (CSV) and the international volleyball body government the Fédération Internationale de Volleyball (FIVB).

== Results ==
=== Summer Youth Olympics ===
Champions Runners up Third place Fourth place

Youth Olympic Games
Year	Round	Position	Pld	W	L	SW	SL	Squad
(Singapore) 2010	Semifinals	Third place						Squad
(China) 2014	No Volleyball Event							
(Argentina) 2018	No Volleyball Event							
Total	0 Titles	1/1						

=== FIVB U18 World Championship ===
Champions Runners up Third place Fourth place

FIVB U18 World Championship
Year	Round	Position	Pld	W	L	SW	SL	Squad
(Brazil) 1989		7th place						Squad
(Portugal) 1991	Didn't Qualify							
(Czechoslovakia) 1993	Semifinals	4th place						Squad
(France) 1995	Didn't Qualify							
(Thailand) 1997	Didn't Qualify							
(Portugal) 1999	Didn't Qualify							
(Croatia) 2001	Didn't Qualify							
(Poland) 2003	Didn't Qualify							
(Macau) 2005	Didn't Qualify							
(Mexico) 2007		14th place						Squad
(Thailand) 2009		6th place						Squad
(Turkey) 2011	Didn't Qualify							
(Thailand) 2013	Semifinals	4th place						Squad
(Peru) 2015		16th place						Squad
(Argentina) 2017		12th place						Squad
(Egypt) 2019		8th place						Squad
(Mexico) 2021		14th place						Squad
Total	0 Titles	9/17						

=== South America U18 Championship ===
Champions Runners up Third place Fourth place

South America U18 Championship
Year	Round	Position	Pld	W	L	SW	SL	Squad
(Argentina) 1978	Final	1st place						Squad
(Brazil) 1980	Final	1st place						Squad
(Paraguay) 1982	Final	Runners-Up						Squad
(Chile) 1984	Final	Runners-Up						Squad
(Peru) 1986	Final	Runners-Up						Squad
(Argentina) 1988	Final	Runners-Up						Squad
(Bolivia) 1990	Semifinals	Third place						Squad
(Venezuela) 1992	Semifinals	Third place						Squad
(Peru) 1994	Final	Runners-Up						Squad
(Uruguay) 1996	Semifinals	Third place						Squad
(Bolivia) 1998	Semifinals	Third place						Squad
(Venezuela) 2000	Semifinals	Third place						Squad
(Venezuela) 2002	Semifinals	4th place						Squad
(Ecuador) 2004	Semifinals	4th place						Squad

South America U18 Championship
Year	Round	Position	Pld	W	L	SW	SL	Squad
(Peru) 2006	Final	Runners-Up						Squad
(Peru) 2008	Final	Runners-Up						Squad
(Peru) 2010	Semifinals	Third place						Squad
(Peru) 2012	Final	1st place						Squad
(Peru) 2014	Semifinals	Third place						Squad
(Peru) 2016	Final	Runners-Up						Squad
(Colombia) 2018	Final	Runners-Up						Squad
Total	3 Titles	21/21						

=== Pan-American U18 Cup ===
Champions Runners up Third place Fourth place

Pan-American U18 Cup
Year	Round	Position	Pld	W	L	SW	SL	Squad
(Mexico) 2011	Semifinals	4th place						Squad
(Guatemala) 2013		6th place						Squad
(Cuba) 2015		5th place						Squad
(Cuba) 2017	Didn't Enter							
(Mexico) 2019	Final	1st place	6	4	2	14	9	Squad
Total	1 Title	4/5						

== Current squad ==
As of August 2026

- Coach: (Peru) Marcello Bencardino
- Assistant Coach: (Peru) Martín Escudero
- Assistant Coach: (Argentina) Lorena Góngora

#	Player	Birth Date	Height	2026/27 Club	Position
1.	Mireya Maldonado	06/11/2011	169	(Peru) Molivoleibol	Setter
2.	Fernanda Pinto	03/05/2010	182	(Peru) Universidad de San Martín de Porres	Outside Hitter
3.	Cielo Quispe	29/08/2010	177	(Peru) Molivoleibol	Opposite
4.	Tamara Galdós	10/01/2012	180	(Peru) Regatas Lima	Opposite
5.	Valentina Valera	15/05/2010	174	(Peru) Club Atlético Atenea	Outside Hitter
6.	Ariana Vásquez	30/06/2009	179	(Peru) Club Atlético Atenea	Outside Hitter
7.	Sofía Olavarría	25/11/2010	177	(Peru) Regatas Lima	Outside Hitter
8.	Dara Herrada	12/10/2010	178	(Peru) Rebaza Acosta	Middle Blocker
9.	Gianella Chanca	07/08/2009	177	(Peru) Rebaza Acosta	Opposite
10.	Shaddia Campos	18/04/2009	182	(Peru) Club Tupac Amaru	Middle Blocker
11.	Galilea Fuentes	22/12/2009	183	(Peru) Universidad de San Martín de Porres	Middle Blocker
12.	Camila Monge	27/04/2009	183	(Peru) Regatas Lima	Outside Hitter
13.	Avril Morán	14/04/2010	179	(Peru) Club Tupac Amaru	Middle Blocker
14.	Kiara Lazo	02/07/2010	177	(Peru) Deportivo Géminis	Middle Blocker
15.	Valentina Valera	18/02/2012	175	(Peru) Club Atlético Atenea	Setter
16.	Zoe Koechlin	09/08/2012	190	(Peru) Regatas Lima	Middle Blocker
17.	Marita Delgado	14/04/2011	189	(Peru) Red Alta	Middle Blocker
18.	Nahir Cueva	08/05/2010	175	(Peru) Club Atlético Atenea	Outside Hitter
19.	Vannia Adrianzen	12/03/2010	156	(Peru) Deportivo Géminis	Libero
20.	Melissa García	22/02/2011	167	(Peru) Universidad de San Martín de Porres	Setter
21.	Kaori Mendoza	07/12/2010	162	(Peru) Universidad de San Martín de Porres	Libero
22.	Brenda Quiroz	20/12/2009	174	(Peru) Club Atlético Atenea	Setter
23.	Alexa Villena	09/09/2009	167	(Peru) Regatas Lima	Libero
24.	Brianna Caldas	16/06/2009	165	(Peru) Rebaza Acosta	Libero
