= 2013 Girls' Youth Pan-American Volleyball Cup =

Tournament details
- Host country: Guatemala
- Dates: April 29–May 4
- Teams: 8
- Venue: 1 (in Guatemala City host cities)

Final positions
- Champions: Brazil (1st title)

Tournament awards
- MVP: Lais Vasques (BRA)

The 2013 Girls' Youth Pan-American Volleyball Cup takes place April 29 to May 4, in Guatemala City. The top ranked team of Pool B at the end of the round-robin preliminary phase will be granted a ticket to the 2013 Youth World Championship in the city of Nakhon Ratchasima, in Thailand, from July 26 to August 4.

According to the competition format, the top two ranked teams in Pool A, will advance directly to the semifinals, while the third and fourth placed squads will meet in the quarterfinals with the top teams of Pool B in cross-over matches.

== First round ==
=== Pool A ===
Pos	Team	Pld	W	L	Pts	SPW	SPL	SPR	SW	SL	SR	Qualification
1	Dominican Republic	3	3	0	14	237	201	1.179	9	1	9.000	Semifinals
2	Brazil	3	2	1	11	239	206	1.160	7	3	2.333	Semifinals
3	Argentina	3	1	2	5	187	204	0.917	3	6	0.500	Quarterfinals
4	Peru	3	0	3	0	173	225	0.769	0	9	0.000	Quarterfinals

Date	Time		Score		Set 1	Set 2	Set 3	Set 4	Set 5	Total
29 Apr	16:00	Peru	0–3	Argentina	16–25	17–25	21–25			54–75
29 Apr	18:00	Dominican Republic	3–1	Brazil	25–21	27–25	10–25	25–18		87–89
30 Apr	14:00	Brazil	3–0	Argentina	25–20	25–18	25–19			75–57
30 Apr	18:00	Dominican Republic	3–0	Peru	25–21	25–15	25–21			75–57
01 May	16:00	Brazil	3–0	Peru	25–20	25–20	25–21			75–62
01 May	18:00	Argentina	0–3	Dominican Republic	15–25	17–25	23–25			55–75

=== Pool B ===
Pos	Team	Pld	W	L	Pts	SPW	SPL	SPR	SW	SL	SR	Qualification
1	Puerto Rico	3	3	0	14	244	177	1.379	9	1	9.000	Quarterfinals
2	Chile	3	2	1	10	215	169	1.272	6	3	2.000	Quarterfinals
3	Colombia	3	1	2	6	218	205	1.063	4	6	0.667	
4	Guatemala	3	0	3	0	100	225	0.444	0	9	0.000	

Date	Time		Score		Set 1	Set 2	Set 3	Set 4	Set 5	Total
29 Apr	14:00	Colombia	1–3	Puerto Rico	21–25	19–25	25–23	15–25		84–94
29 Apr	20:00	Guatemala	0–3	Chile	18–25	11–25	7–25			36–75
30 Apr	16:00	Puerto Rico	3–0	Chile	25–23	25–21	25–21			75–65
30 Apr	20:00	Colombia	3–0	Guatemala	25–11	25–14	25–11			75–36
01 May	14:00	Chile	3–0	Colombia	25–18	25–21	25–19			75–58
01 May	20:00	Puerto Rico	3–0	Guatemala	25–6	25–13	25–9			75–28

== Final round ==
=== Championship bracket ===
Quarterfinals
B1	Puerto Rico	3
A4	Peru	2
B2	Chile	1
A3	Argentina	3

Semifinals
A1	Dominican Republic	2
B1	Puerto Rico	3
A2	Brazil	3
A3	Argentina	0

Finals
B1	Puerto Rico	2
A2	Brazil	3
Third place
A1	Dominican Republic	3
A3	Argentina	1

=== 5th–8th places bracket ===
Classification 5/8
Chile	3
Colombia	1
Peru	3
Guatemala	0

5th Place Match
Chile	3
Peru	2
7th Place Match
Colombia	3
Guatemala	0

=== Quarterfinals ===
Date	Time		Score		Set 1	Set 2	Set 3	Set 4	Set 5	Total
02 may	18:00	Chile	1–3	Argentina	18–25	30–28	17–25	18–25		83–103
02 may	20:00	Puerto Rico	3–2	Peru	25–18	18–25	21–25	25–20	15–9	104–97

=== Classification 5/8 ===
Date	Time		Score		Set 1	Set 2	Set 3	Set 4	Set 5	Total
03 may	14:00	Chile	3–1	Colombia	25–22	22–25	26–24	25–16		98–87
03 may	16:00	Peru	3–0	Guatemala	25–8	25–12	25–14			75–34

=== Semifinals ===
Date	Time		Score		Set 1	Set 2	Set 3	Set 4	Set 5	Total
03 may	18:00	Brazil	3–0	Argentina	27–25	25–21	25–19			77–65
03 may	20:00	Dominican Republic	2–3	Puerto Rico	19–25	23–25	25–19	25–15	9–15	101–99

=== Seventh place match ===
Date	Time		Score		Set 1	Set 2	Set 3	Set 4	Set 5	Total
04 may	14:00	Colombia	3–0	Guatemala	25–18	25–14	25–13			75–45

=== Fifth place match ===
Date	Time		Score		Set 1	Set 2	Set 3	Set 4	Set 5	Total
04 may	16:00	Chile	3–2	Peru	16–25	25–14	17–25	25–16	16–14	99–94

=== Bronze medal match ===
Date	Time		Score		Set 1	Set 2	Set 3	Set 4	Set 5	Total
04 may	18:00	Dominican Republic	3–1	Argentina	25–16	25–17	10–25	25–22		95–80

=== Final ===
Date	Time		Score		Set 1	Set 2	Set 3	Set 4	Set 5	Total
04 may	20:00	Puerto Rico	2–3	Brazil	25–20	19–25	13–25	25–23	12–15	94–108

== Final standing ==
Rank	Team
1st place, gold medalist(s)	Brazil
2nd place, silver medalist(s)	Puerto Rico
3rd place, bronze medalist(s)	Dominican Republic
4	Argentina
5	Chile
6	Peru
7	Colombia
8	Guatemala

2013 Girls' Youth Pan-American Cup champions

Brazil
1st title

== Individual awards ==
- Most valuable player
  - Lais Vasques (BRA)
- Best scorer
  - Catalina Melo (CHI)
- Best spiker
  - Laura Sotomayor (CHI)
- Best blocker
  - Laiza Ferreira (BRA)
- Best server
  - Laura Sotomayor (CHI)
- Best digger
  - Lais Vasques (BRA)
- Best setter
  - Wilmarie Rivera (PUR)
- Best receiver
  - Okiana Valle (PUR)
- Best libero
  - Lais Vasques (BRA)
