= 2019 Girls' Youth Pan-American Volleyball Cup =

Tournament details
- Host country: (Mexico) Durango
- Dates: 19 – 27 May 2019
- Teams: 8
- Venue: 1 (in 1 host city)

Final positions
- Champions: Peru (1st title)

Tournament awards
- MVP: Janelly Ceopa (PER)

The 2019 Girls' Youth Pan-American Volleyball Cup was played from May 19 to May 27, 2019, in Durango, Mexico. Eight teams competed in this tournament. Peru won the tournament for the first time defeating Puerto Rico. Since Peru had already qualified for the 2019 World Championship through the South American Championship, Puerto Rico and Mexico qualified instead. Janelly Ceopa of Peru was named the tournament MVP.

== Competing nations ==
Group A	Group B
Mexico; Dominican Republic; Chile; Honduras	Puerto Rico; Cuba; Peru; Guatemala

== Preliminary round ==
- All times are in Peru Standard Time (UTC−05:00)

=== Group A ===
Pos	Team	Pld	W	L	Pts	SPW	SPL	SPR	SW	SL	SR	Qualification
1	Mexico	3	3	0	13	260	186	1.398	9	2	4.500	Semifinals
2	Dominican Republic	3	2	1	11	238	184	1.293	7	3	2.333	Quarterfinals
3	Chile	3	1	2	6	197	210	0.938	4	6	0.667	Quarterfinals
4	Honduras	3	0	3	0	110	225	0.489	0	9	0.000	

Date	Time		Score		Set 1	Set 2	Set 3	Set 4	Set 5	Total	Report
21 May	18:00	Chile	0–3	Dominican Republic	20–25	13–25	23–25			56–75	P2P3
21 May	20:00	Mexico	3–0	Honduras	25–14	25–5	25–13			75–32	P2P3
22 May	14:00	Honduras	0–3	Dominican Republic	14–25	5–25	15–25			34–75	P2P3
22 May	20:00	Mexico	3–1	Chile	25–12	15–25	25–12	25–17		90–66	P2P3
23 May	16:00	Chile	3–0	Honduras	25–13	25–18	25–14			75–45	P2P3
23 May	20:00	Mexico	3–1	Dominican Republic	25–18	20–25	25–23	25–22		95–88	P2P3

=== Group B ===
Pos	Team	Pld	W	L	Pts	SPW	SPL	SPR	SW	SL	SR	Qualification
1	Puerto Rico	3	3	0	11	282	258	1.093	9	4	2.250	Semifinals
2	Cuba	3	2	1	12	252	210	1.200	8	3	2.667	Quarterfinals
3	Peru	3	1	2	7	245	208	1.178	5	6	0.833	Quarterfinals
4	Guatemala	3	0	3	0	122	225	0.542	0	9	0.000	

Date	Time		Score		Set 1	Set 2	Set 3	Set 4	Set 5	Total	Report
21 May	14:00	Guatemala	0–3	Puerto Rico	20–25	15–25	9–25			44–75	P2P3
21 May	16:00	Peru	0–3	Cuba	23–25	12–25	23–25			58–75	P2P3
22 May	16:00	Cuba	3–0	Guatemala	25–11	25–12	25–19			75–42	P2P3
22 May	18:00	Puerto Rico	3–2	Peru	26–24	14–25	15–25	27–25	15–13	97–112	P2P3
23 May	14:00	Guatemala	0–3	Peru	11–25	7–25	18–25			36–75	P2P3
23 May	18:00	Cuba	2–3	Puerto Rico	25–20	20–25	27–25	21–25	9–15	102–110	P2P3

== Final round ==
=== Championship bracket ===
Quarterfinals
B2	Cuba	1
A3	Chile	3
A2	Dominican Republic	1
B3	Peru	3

Semifinals
A3	Chile	1
B1	Puerto Rico	3
B3	Peru	3
A1	Mexico	2

Finals
B1	Puerto Rico	0
B3	Peru	3
Third place
A3	Chile	1
A1	Mexico	3

=== Classification 5–8 ===
Date	Time		Score		Set 1	Set 2	Set 3	Set 4	Set 5	Total	Report
25 May	14:00	Guatemala	0–3	Dominican Republic	19–25	15–25	15–25			49–75	P2P3
25 May	16:00	Honduras	0–3	Cuba	13–25	18–25	16–25			47–75	P2P3

=== Quarterfinals ===
Date	Time		Score		Set 1	Set 2	Set 3	Set 4	Set 5	Total	Report
24 May	18:00	Cuba	1–3	Chile	15–25	21–25	27–25	20–25		83–100	P2P3
24 May	20:00	Dominican Republic	1–3	Peru	17–25	24–26	25–16	22–25		88–92	P2P3

=== Semifinals ===
Date	Time		Score		Set 1	Set 2	Set 3	Set 4	Set 5	Total	Report
25 May	18:00	Puerto Rico	3–1	Chile	15–25	25–19	25–21	25–18		90–83	P2P3
25 May	20:00	Mexico	2–3	Peru	25–20	23–25	25–18	22–25	20–22	115–110	P2P3

=== Seventh place match ===
Date	Time		Score		Set 1	Set 2	Set 3	Set 4	Set 5	Total	Report
26 May	12:00	Guatemala	3–0	Honduras	25–17	25–22	25–17			75–56	P2P3

=== Fifth place match ===
Date	Time		Score		Set 1	Set 2	Set 3	Set 4	Set 5	Total	Report
26 May	14:00	Dominican Republic	2–3	Cuba	14–25	22–25	25–14	25–21	15–17	101–102	P2P3

=== Bronze medal match ===
Date	Time		Score		Set 1	Set 2	Set 3	Set 4	Set 5	Total	Report
26 May	16:00	Chile	1–3	Mexico	21–25	27–25	21–25	15–25		84–100	P2P3

=== Final ===
Date	Time		Score		Set 1	Set 2	Set 3	Set 4	Set 5	Total	Report
26 May	18:00	Puerto Rico	0–3	Peru	24–26	16–25	22–25			62–76	P2P3

== Final standing ==
Rank	Team
1st place, gold medalist(s)	Peru
2nd place, silver medalist(s)	Puerto Rico
3rd place, bronze medalist(s)	Mexico
4	Chile
5	Cuba
6	Dominican Republic
7	Guatemala
8	Honduras

Qualified for FIVB U18 World Championship

2019 Girls' Youth Pan-American Cup champions

Peru
1st title

Team Roster:

Yadhira Anchant, Carolina Takahash, Sarita Ceopa, Nicolle Perez, Maria Lopez, Francesca Calderon, Yohmara Rivera, Brunella Milla, Lizanyela Lopez, Antuanett Garcia, Alondra Alarcon,

Thaisa Leod
Head Coach: (Peru) Natalia Málaga

== Individual awards ==
- Most valuable player
  - Janelly Ceopa (PER)
- Best scorer
  - Melanie Parra (MEX)
- Best setter
  - Gloria Ung (MEX)
- Best Opposite
  - Marián Ovalle (MEX)
- Best outside hitters
  - Flormarie Heredia (DOM)
  - Melanie Parra (MEX)
- Best middle blockers
  - Esthefany Rabit (DOM)
  - Elsa Sandrock (CHI)
- Best libero
  - Kiaralyz Perez (PUR)
- Best server
  - Gloria Ung (MEX)
- Best receiver
  - Kiaralyz Perez (PUR)
- Best digger
  - Kiaralyz Perez (PUR)
