= Priscila Bosio =

Argentine volleyball player (born 1994)

Personal information
- Nationality: Argentine
- Born: 11 March 1994 (age 32)
- Height: 182 cm (72 in)
- Weight: 72 kg (159 lb)
- Spike: 292 cm (115 in)
- Block: 275 cm (108 in)

Volleyball information
- Number: 19 (national team)

Career
Years	Teams
2015	GELP

National team
2015	Argentina
Honours
U18 Pan American Cup
Gold medal – first place	2011 Tijuana	Team

Priscila Bosio (born 3 November 1994) is an Argentine female volleyball player. She is part of the Argentina women's national volleyball team.

She participated in the 2015 FIVB Volleyball World Grand Prix, and 2018 FIVB Volleyball Women's Nations League At club level she played for GELP in 2015, Nautico Sportivo Avellaneda in 2021 and nowadays Feel Volley Alconbendas
