= Wang Yunlu =

Chinese volleyball player (born 1996)

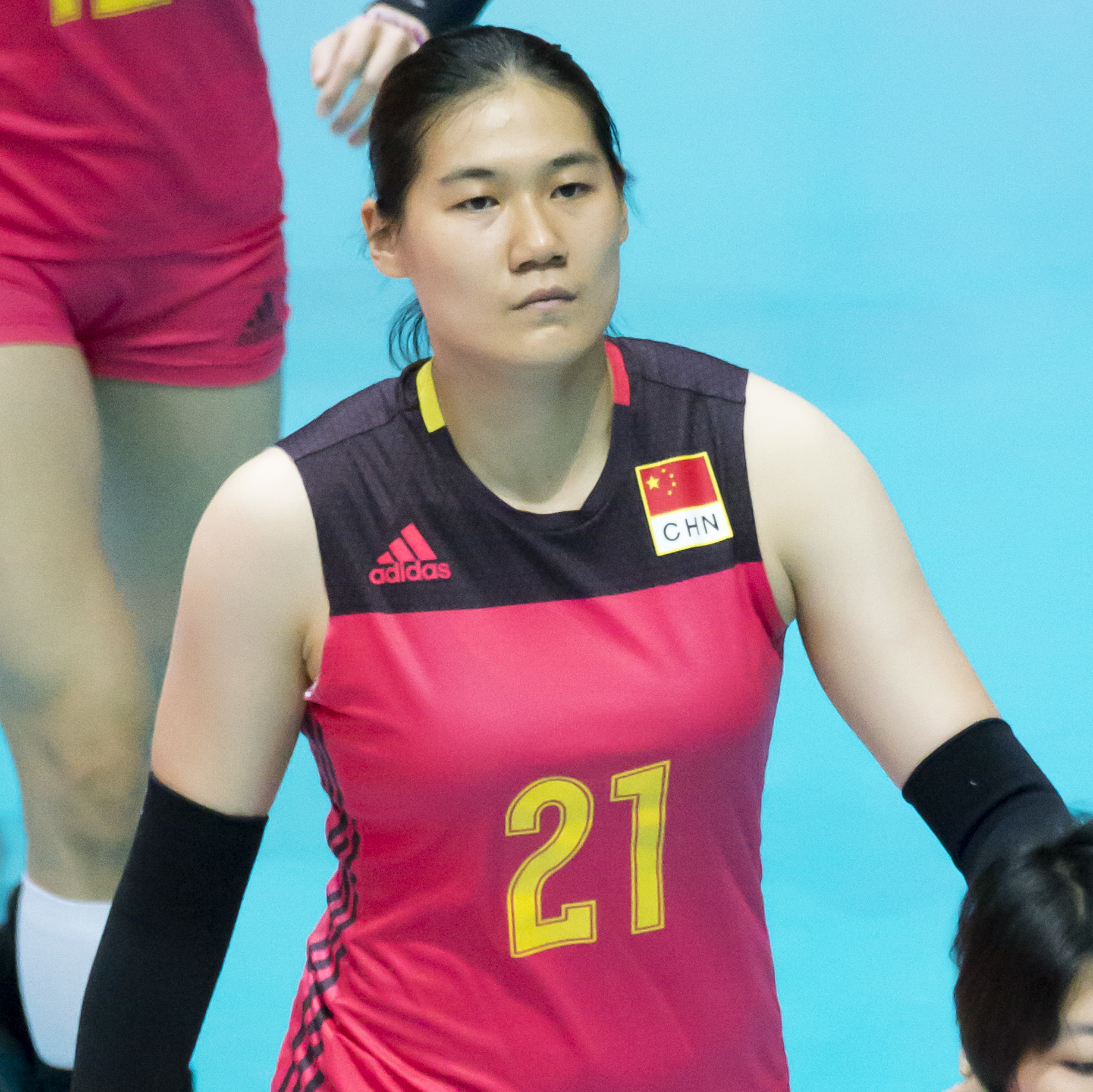

Personal information
- Full name: Wang Yunlu
- Nationality: Chinese
- Born: 20 May 1996 (age 30) Sichuan, China
- Home town: Sichuan, China
- Height: 1.92 m (6 ft 4 in)
- Weight: 82 kg (181 lb)
- Spike: 315 cm (124 in)
- Block: 305 cm (120 in)

Volleyball information
- Position: Wing Spiker
- Current club: Army
- Number: 1

Career
- Years: Team
- 2013 - present: Army

National team
- Years: Team
- 2012 - 2013 2014 2015 - 2017, 2022-2024: China U18; China U20; China
Honours
Women's volleyball
Representing China
Volleyball Nations League
| Silver medal – second place | 2023 Arlington | Team |
Asian Games
| Gold medal – first place | 2022 Hangzhou | Team |
Asian Youth Volleyball Championship
| Silver medal – second place | 2012 Chengdu | Team |
Girls Youth Volleyball World Championship
| Gold medal – first place | 2013 Nakhon Ratchasima | Team |
- Updated on October 2018

Wang Yunlu (simplified Chinese: 王云蕗; traditional Chinese: 王雲蕗; pinyin: Wáng Yúnlù; born 20 May 1996 in Beijing) is a Chinese volleyball player. She won the 2013 FIVB Volleyball Girls' U18 World Championship.

She was part of the China team in 2017 who took part in the FIVB Volleyball World Grand Prix in Macao. The team who included Zhu Ting, Qian Jingwen, Zheng Yixin, Wang Mengjie played against the US, Turkey and Italy. The final part of the competition was in Nanjing in China where the team came fourth.

== Clubs ==
- (China) Army
