= Aidachi Aguero =

Cuban volleyball player (born 1999)

Aidachi Attilah Aguero Aguilera

Personal information
- Nationality: Cuban
- Born: 19 March 1999 (age 27)
- Height: 177 cm (5 ft 10 in)
- Weight: 69 kg (152 lb)
- Spike: 304 cm (120 in)
- Block: 295 cm (116 in)

Career
Years	Teams
2015	Camaguey

National team
2015	Cuba

Aidachi Attilah Aguero Aguilera (born 19 March 1999) is a Cuban female volleyball player. She is part of the Cuba women's national volleyball team.

She participated in the 2015 FIVB Volleyball World Grand Prix. On club level she played for Camaguey in 2015.
