= 2011 Girls' Youth Pan-American Volleyball Cup =

Tournament details
- Host country: Mexico
- Dates: July 1–9, 2011
- Teams: 8
- Venue: 1 (in 1 host city)

Final positions
- Champions: Argentina (1st title)

Tournament awards
- MVP: Priscila Bosio (ARG)

The 2011 Girls' Youth Pan-American Volleyball Cup was the first edition of the annual women's volleyball tournament, played by eight countries from July 1–9, 2011 in Tijuana, Mexico.

== Competing nations ==
Group A	Group B
Dominican Republic; El Salvador; Peru; Puerto Rico	Argentina; Chile; Costa Rica; Mexico

== Preliminary round ==
=== Group A ===
Pos	Team	Pld	W	L	Pts	SPW	SPL	SPR	SW	SL	SR	Qualification
1	Dominican Republic	3	3	0	9	225	124	1.815	9	0	MAX	Semifinals
2	Peru	3	2	1	5	232	207	1.121	6	5	1.200	Quarterfinals
3	Puerto Rico	3	1	2	4	236	221	1.068	5	6	0.833	Quarterfinals
4	El Salvador	3	0	3	0	84	225	0.373	0	9	0.000	

Date	Time		Score		Set 1	Set 2	Set 3	Set 4	Set 5	Total	Report
3 July	14:00	Peru	3–0	El Salvador	25–9	25–9	25–9			75–27	P2
3 July	18:00	Dominican Republic	3–0	Puerto Rico	25–23	25–19	25–14			75–56	P2
4 July	14:00	Dominican Republic	3–0	El Salvador	25–8	25–11	25–5			75–24	P2
4 July	18:00	Peru	3–2	Puerto Rico	25–19	23–25	25–21	25–27	15–13	113–105	P2
5 July	14:00	Puerto Rico	3–0	El Salvador	25–10	25–5	25–18			75–33	P2
5 July	18:00	Peru	0–3	Dominican Republic	18–25	14–25	12–25			44–75	44–75

=== Group B ===
Pos	Team	Pld	W	L	Pts	SPW	SPL	SPR	SW	SL	SR	Qualification
1	Argentina	3	3	0	9	225	113	1.991	9	0	MAX	Semifinals
2	Mexico	3	2	1	5	198	141	1.404	6	5	1.200	Quarterfinals
3	Chile	3	1	2	4	174	221	0.787	5	6	0.833	Quarterfinals
4	Costa Rica	3	0	3	0	125	247	0.506	0	9	0.000	

Date	Time		Score		Set 1	Set 2	Set 3	Set 4	Set 5	Total	Report
3 July	16:00	Argentina	3–0	Costa Rica	25–8	26–9	25–6			76–23	P2
3 July	20:00	Mexico	3–0	Chile	25–8	25–15	25–12			75–35	P2
4 July	16:00	Argentina	3–0	Chile	25–18	25–11	25–13			75–42	P2
4 July	20:00	Mexico	3–0	Costa Rica	25–11	23–11	25–9			73–31	P2
5 July	16:00	Chile	3–1	Costa Rica	25–18	25–16	22–25	25–12		97–71	P2
5 July	20:00	Mexico	0–3	Argentina	14–25	14–25	20–25			48–75	44–75

== Final round ==
=== Championship bracket ===
Quarterfinals
A2	Peru	3
B3	Chile	0
B2	Mexico	3
A3	Puerto Rico	0

Semifinals
B1	Argentina	3
A2	Peru	1
A1	Dominican Republic	2
B2	Mexico	3

Finals
B1	Argentina	3
B2	Mexico	2
Third place
A2	Peru	2
A1	Dominican Republic	3

=== 5th–8th places bracket ===
Classification 5/8
El Salvador	0
Chile	3
Puerto Rico	3
Costa Rica	0

5th Place Match
Chile	0
Puerto Rico	3
7th Place Match
El Salvador	2
Costa Rica	3

=== Quarterfinals ===
Date	Time		Score		Set 1	Set 2	Set 3	Set 4	Set 5	Total	Report
6 July	18:00	Peru	3–0	Chile	25–9	25–13	25–11			75–33	P2
6 July	20:00	Mexico	3–0	Puerto Rico	26–24	25–17	28–26			79–67	79–67

=== Classification 5/8 ===
Date	Time		Score		Set 1	Set 2	Set 3	Set 4	Set 5	Total	Report
7 July	14:00	El Salvador	0–3	Chile	23–25	21–25	20–25			64–75	P2
7 July	16:00	Costa Rica	0–3	Puerto Rico	15–25	10–25	19–25			44–75	44–75

=== Semifinals ===
Date	Time		Score		Set 1	Set 2	Set 3	Set 4	Set 5	Total	Report
7 July	18:00	Argentina	3–1	Peru	25–21	24–26	25–22	25–15		99–84	P2
7 July	20:00	Dominican Republic	2–3	Mexico	25–19	12–25	25–18	23–25	5–15	90–102	90–102

=== Seventh place match ===
Date	Time		Score		Set 1	Set 2	Set 3	Set 4	Set 5	Total	Report
8 July	14:00	El Salvador	2–3	Costa Rica	16–25	25–23	24–26	25–21	6–15	96–110	96–110

=== Fifth place match ===
Date	Time		Score		Set 1	Set 2	Set 3	Set 4	Set 5	Total	Report
8 July	16:00	Chile	0–3	Puerto Rico	15–25	14–25	20–25			49–75	49–75

=== Bronze medal match ===
Date	Time		Score		Set 1	Set 2	Set 3	Set 4	Set 5	Total	Report
8 July	18:00	Peru	2–3	Dominican Republic	25–23	25–23	13–25	12–25	9–15	84–111	84–111

=== Final ===
Date	Time		Score		Set 1	Set 2	Set 3	Set 4	Set 5	Total	Report
8 July	20:00	Argentina	3–2	Mexico	25–20	25–27	25–21	15–25	15–13	105–106	105–106

== Final standing ==
Rank	Team
1st place, gold medalist(s)	Argentina
2nd place, silver medalist(s)	Mexico
3rd place, bronze medalist(s)	Dominican Republic
4	Peru
5	Puerto Rico
6	Chile
7	Costa Rica
8	El Salvador

2011 Girls' Youth Pan-American Cup champions

Argentina
1st title

== Individual awards ==
- Most valuable player
  - Priscila Bosio (ARG)
- Best scorer
  - Samantha Bricio (MEX)
- Best spiker
  - Brayelin Martínez (DOM)
- Best blocker
  - Luz Divina Nuñez (DOM)
- Best server
  - Alejandra Isiordia (MEX)
- Best digger
  - Dianise Rodriguez (PUR)
- Best setter
  - Graciela Allende (ARG)
- Best receiver
  - Jazmin Molly (ARG)
- Best libero
  - Winifer Fernández (DOM)
