= 2017 Girls' Youth Pan-American Volleyball Cup =

Tournament details
- Host country: (Cuba) Havana
- Dates: 28 Mar – 2 Apr 2017
- Teams: 10
- Venue: 1 (in 1 host city)

Final positions
- Champions: Colombia (1st title)

Tournament awards
- MVP: Valerin Carabali (COL)

The 2017 Girls' Youth Pan-American Volleyball Cup was played from March 28, 2017, to April 2, 2017, in Habana, Cuba. Ten teams competed in this season.

== Competing nations ==
Group A	Group B	Group C
Argentina; Chile; Puerto Rico	Colombia; Costa Rica; Cuba	Dominican Republic; Guatemala; Mexico; Uruguay

== Preliminary round ==
- All times are in Cuba Daylight Time (UTC−04:00)

=== Group A ===
Pos	Team	Pld	W	L	Pts	SPW	SPL	SPR	SW	SL	SR	Qualification
1	Argentina	2	2	0	9	176	123	1.431	6	1	6.000	Semifinals
2	Chile	2	1	1	4	197	201	0.980	4	5	0.800	Quarterfinals
3	Puerto Rico	2	0	2	2	136	185	0.735	2	6	0.333	

Date	Time		Score		Set 1	Set 2	Set 3	Set 4	Set 5	Total	Report
28 Mar	14:00	Puerto Rico	2–3	Chile	18–25	25–19	25–23	16–25	16–18	100–110	P2 P3
29 Mar	18:00	Chile	1–3	Argentina	21–25	20–25	28–26	18–25		87–101	P2 P3
30 Mar	18:00	Argentina	3–0	Puerto Rico	25–14	25–13	25–9			75–36	P2 P3

=== Group B ===
Pos	Team	Pld	W	L	Pts	SPW	SPL	SPR	SW	SL	SR	Qualification
1	Cuba	2	2	0	9	172	122	1.410	6	1	6.000	Quarterfinals
2	Colombia	2	1	1	6	164	142	1.155	4	3	1.333	Quarterfinals
3	Costa Rica	2	0	2	0	78	150	0.520	0	6	0.000	

Date	Time		Score		Set 1	Set 2	Set 3	Set 4	Set 5	Total	Report
28 Mar	20:00	Cuba	3–0	Costa Rica	25–13	25–7	25–13			75–33	P2 P3
29 Mar	20:00	Cuba	3–1	Colombia	25–22	25–21	22–25	25–21		97–89	P2 P3
30 Mar	14:00	Costa Rica	0–3	Colombia	15–25	15–25	15–25			45–75	P2 P3

=== Group C ===
Pos	Team	Pld	W	L	Pts	SPW	SPL	SPR	SW	SL	SR	Qualification
1	Dominican Republic	3	3	0	14	246	136	1.809	9	1	9.000	Semifinals
2	Mexico	3	2	1	11	217	172	1.262	7	3	2.333	Quarterfinals
3	Uruguay	3	1	2	3	187	246	0.760	3	8	0.375	
4	Guatemala	3	0	3	2	163	259	0.629	2	9	0.222	

Date	Time		Score		Set 1	Set 2	Set 3	Set 4	Set 5	Total	Report
28 Mar	16:00	Dominican Republic	3–0	Uruguay	25–14	25–9	25–14			75–37	P2 P3
28 Mar	18:00	Mexico	3–0	Guatemala	25–15	25–8	25–12			75–35	P2 P3
29 Mar	14:00	Uruguay	0–3	Mexico	12–25	9–25	20–25			41–75	P2 P3
29 Mar	16:00	Guatemala	0–3	Dominican Republic	10–25	10–25	12–25			32–75	P2 P3
30 Mar	16:00	Uruguay	3–2	Guatemala	23–25	20–25	26–24	25–16	15–6	109–96	P2 P3
30 Mar	20:00	Dominican Republic	3–1	Mexico	25–15	25–18	21–25	25–9		96–67	P2 P3

== Final round ==
=== Championship bracket ===
Quarterfinals
B1	Cuba	3
A2	Chile	0
B2	Colombia	3
C2	Mexico	1

Semifinals
A1	Argentina	2
B1	Cuba	3
C1	Dominican Republic	2
B2	Colombia	3

Finals
B1	Cuba	0
B2	Colombia	3
Third place
A1	Argentina	1
C1	Dominican Republic	3

=== 7th–10th places bracket ===
Classification 7–10
Uruguay	2
Costa Rica	3
Puerto Rico	3
Guatemala	0

7th place match
Costa Rica	0
Puerto Rico	3
9th place match
Uruguay	3
Guatemala	2

=== Classification 7–10 ===
Date	Time		Score		Set 1	Set 2	Set 3	Set 4	Set 5	Total	Report
31 Mar	14:00	Uruguay	2–3	Costa Rica	22–25	12–25	25–22	25–17	7–15	91–104	P2 P3
31 Mar	16:00	Puerto Rico	3–0	Guatemala	25–14	25–16	25–17			75–47	P2 P3

=== Quarterfinals ===
Date	Time		Score		Set 1	Set 2	Set 3	Set 4	Set 5	Total	Report
31 Mar	18:00	Colombia	3–1	Mexico	25–16	25–27	25–21	25–22		100–86	P2 P3
31 Mar	20:00	Cuba	3–0	Chile	25–17	25–20	25–14			75–51	P2 P3

=== Semifinals ===
Date	Time		Score		Set 1	Set 2	Set 3	Set 4	Set 5	Total	Report
1 Apr	18:00	Dominican Republic	2–3	Colombia	25–10	25–22	16–25	26–28	11–15	103–100	P2 P3
1 Apr	20:00	Argentina	2–3	Cuba	25–20	25–27	25–18	19–25	11–15	105–105	P2 P3

=== Ninth place match ===
Date	Time		Score		Set 1	Set 2	Set 3	Set 4	Set 5	Total	Report
1 Apr	14:00	Uruguay	3–2	Guatemala	25–22	16–25	25–17	21–25	15–12	102–101	P2 P3

=== Seventh place match ===
Date	Time		Score		Set 1	Set 2	Set 3	Set 4	Set 5	Total	Report
1 Apr	16:00	Costa Rica	0–3	Puerto Rico	9–25	20–25	21–25			50–75	P2 P3

=== Fifth place match ===
Date	Time		Score		Set 1	Set 2	Set 3	Set 4	Set 5	Total	Report
2 Apr	16:00	Mexico	3–0	Chile	25–20	25–14	25–15			75–49	P2 P3

=== Bronze medal match ===
Date	Time		Score		Set 1	Set 2	Set 3	Set 4	Set 5	Total	Report
2 Apr	18:00	Argentina	1–3	Dominican Republic	25–22	22–25	17–25	23–25		87–97	P2 P3

=== Final ===
Date	Time		Score		Set 1	Set 2	Set 3	Set 4	Set 5	Total	Report
2 Apr	20:00	Cuba	0–3	Colombia	22–25	18–25	19–25			59–75	P2 P3

== Final standing ==
Rank	Team
1st place, gold medalist(s)	Colombia
2nd place, silver medalist(s)	Cuba
3rd place, bronze medalist(s)	Dominican Republic
4	Argentina
5	Mexico
6	Chile
7	Puerto Rico
8	Costa Rica
9	Uruguay
10	Guatemala

Qualified for FIVB U18 World Championship

2017 Girls' Youth Pan-American Cup champions

Colombia
1st title

== Individual awards ==
- Most valuable player
  - Valerin Carabali (COL)
- Best scorer
  - Madeline Guillén (DOM)
- Best setter
  - Angie Velázquez (COL)
- Best Opposite
  - Yanlis Feliz Sena (DOM)
- Best Outside Hitters
  - Aliama Cesé (CUB)
  - Madeline Guillén (DOM)
- Best Middle Blockers
  - Valerin Carabali (COL)
  - Yanisleidys Viltres (CUB)
- Best libero
  - Barbara Rodríguez (CHI)
- Best server
  - Elizabeth Vicet (CUB)
- Best receiver
  - Sofía Meinardi (ARG)
- Best digger
  - Joseline Landeros (MEX)
