= Sabrina Soledad Germanier =

Argentine volleyball player (born 1999)

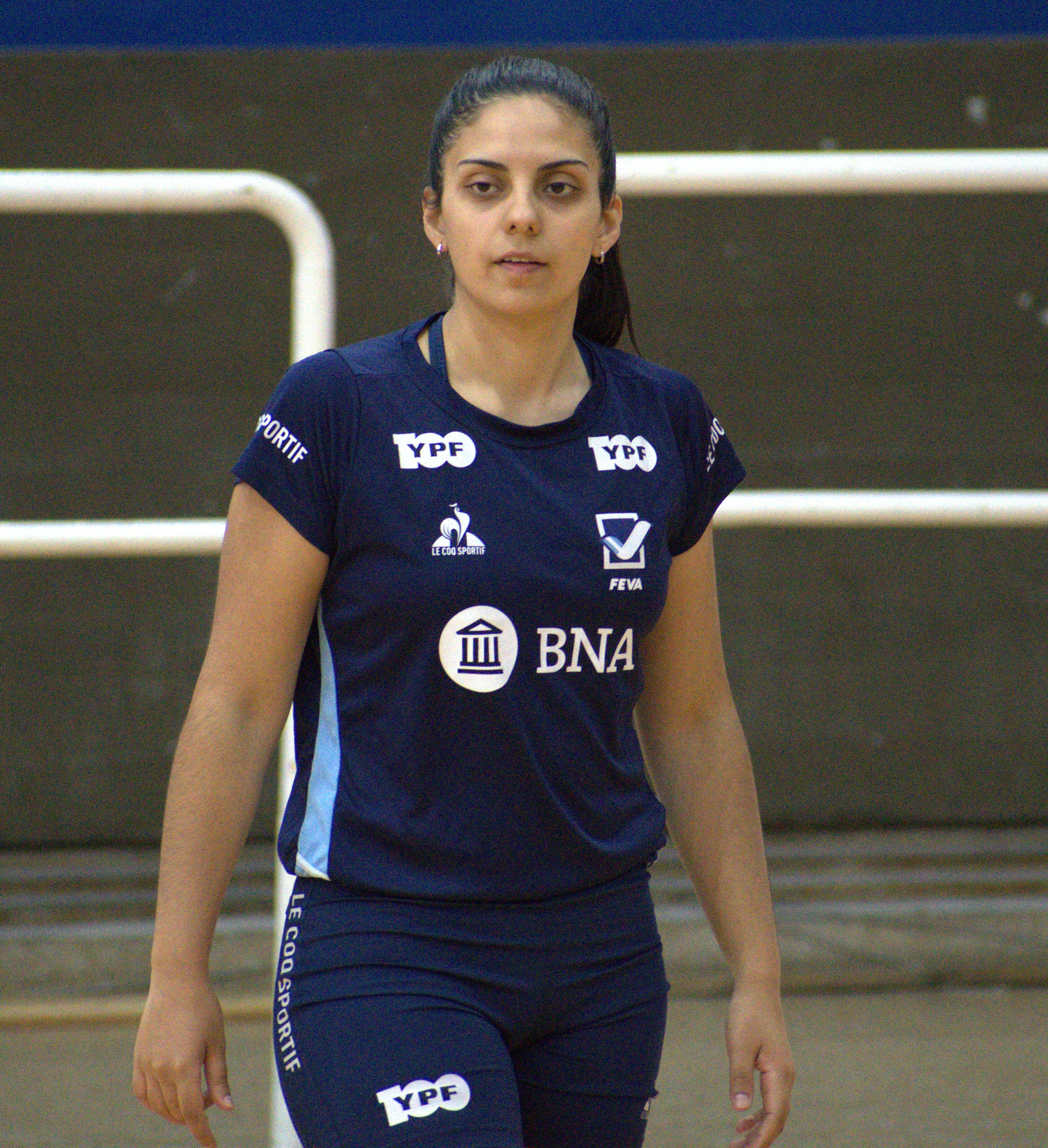
- Germanier in 2022

Personal information
- National team: Argentina women's volleyball team
- Born: 7 June 1999
- Height: 174 cm (5 ft 9 in)
- Weight: 69 kg (152 lb)

Sport
- Sport: Volleyball
- Position: Setter

Sabrina Soledad Germanier (born 1999) is an Argentine volleyball player. She plays as a setter for the national volleyball team, Boca Juniors.

== 2020 Tokyo Summer Olympics ==
Germanier participated in the 2020 Tokyo Olympics, where the Argentine women's volleyball team ranked 11th.
