= 2015 Girls' Youth Pan-American Volleyball Cup =

International volleyball tournament

Tournament details
- Host country: (Cuba) Havana
- Dates: 17 – 22 March 2015
- Teams: 8
- Venue: 1 (in 1 host city)

Final positions
- Champions: Argentina (2nd title)

Tournament awards
- MVP: Anahi Tosi (ARG)

The 2015 Girls' Youth Pan-American Volleyball Cup played by eight countries from March 17–22, 2015 in Habana, Cuba.

== Competing nations ==
Group A	Group B
Argentina; Peru; Dominican Republic; Mexico	Puerto Rico; Chile; Costa Rica; Cuba

== Preliminary round ==
=== Group A ===
Pos	Team	Pld	W	L	Pts	SPW	SPL	SPR	SW	SL	SR	Qualification
1	Dominican Republic	3	3	0	13	259	185	1.400	9	2	4.500	Semifinals
2	Argentina	3	1	2	7	237	232	1.022	5	6	0.833	Quarterfinals
3	Peru	3	1	2	7	219	248	0.883	5	6	0.833	Quarterfinals
4	Mexico	3	1	2	3	205	255	0.804	3	8	0.375	

Date	Time		Score		Set 1	Set 2	Set 3	Set 4	Set 5	Total	Report
17 Mar	14:00	Argentina	0–3	Peru	19–25	22–25	24–26			65–76	P2 P3
17 Mar	18:00	Dominican Republic	3–0	Mexico	25–21	25–13	25–16			75–50	P2 P3
18 Mar	16:00	Mexico	0–3	Argentina	11–25	18–25	18–25			47–75	P2 P3
18 Mar	18:00	Peru	0–3	Dominican Republic	15–25	9–25	14–25			38–75	P2 P3
19 Mar	16:00	Mexico	3–2	Peru	25–21	25–21	23–25	20–25	15–13	108–105	P2 P3
19 Mar	18:00	Dominican Republic	3–2	Argentina	21–25	25–23	23–25	25–19	15–5	109–97	P2 P3

=== Group B ===
Pos	Team	Pld	W	L	Pts	SPW	SPL	SPR	SW	SL	SR	Qualification
1	Cuba	3	3	0	14	243	135	1.800	9	1	9.000	Semifinals and 2015 World championship
2	Puerto Rico	3	2	1	9	264	239	1.105	7	5	1.400	Quarterfinals
3	Chile	3	1	2	7	227	219	1.037	5	6	0.833	Quarterfinals
4	Costa Rica	3	0	3	0	84	225	0.373	0	9	0.000	

Date	Time		Score		Set 1	Set 2	Set 3	Set 4	Set 5	Total	Report
17 Mar	16:00	Costa Rica	0–3	Chile	11–25	11–25	6–25			28–75	P2 P3
17 Mar	20:00	Cuba	3–1	Puerto Rico	25–18	25–12	18–25	25–18		93–73	P2 P3
18 Mar	14:00	Costa Rica	0–3	Puerto Rico	13–25	10–25	14–25			37–75	P2 P3
18 Mar	20:00	Cuba	3–0	Chile	25–13	25–17	25–13			75–43	P2 P3
19 Mar	14:00	Chile	2–3	Puerto Rico	21–25	31–29	19–25	25–22	13–15	109–116	P2 P3
19 Mar	20:00	Cuba	3–0	Costa Rica	25–2	25–6	25–11			75–19	P2 P3

== Final round ==
=== Championship bracket ===
Quarterfinals
A2	Argentina	3
B3	Chile	0
B2	Puerto Rico	3
A3	Peru	1

Semifinals
B1	Cuba	1
A2	Argentina	3
A1	Dominican Republic	3
B2	Puerto Rico	2

Finals
A1	Dominican Republic	2
A2	Argentina	3
Third place
B2	Puerto Rico	0
B1	Cuba	3

=== 5th–8th places bracket ===
Classification 5/8
Mexico	3
Chile	0
Costa Rica	0
Peru	3

5th Place Match
Mexico	2
Peru	3
7th Place Match
Chile	W
Costa Rica	O

=== Quarterfinals ===
Date	Time		Score		Set 1	Set 2	Set 3	Set 4	Set 5	Total	Report
20 mar	14:30	Puerto Rico	3–1	Peru	25–22	14–25	25–20	26–24		90–91	P2 P3
20 mar	16:30	Argentina	3–0	Chile	25–14	25–14	25–17			75–45	P2 P3

=== Classification 5/8 ===
Date	Time		Score		Set 1	Set 2	Set 3	Set 4	Set 5	Total	Report
21 mar	14:00	Mexico	3–0	Chile	25–22	25–15	25–23			75–60	P2 P3
21 mar	16:00	Costa Rica	0–3	Peru	8–25	18–25	5–25			31–75	P2 P3

=== Semifinals ===
Date	Time		Score		Set 1	Set 2	Set 3	Set 4	Set 5	Total	Report
21 mar	18:00	Dominican Republic	3–2	Puerto Rico	21–25	26–28	25–15	25–18	15–9	112–95	P2 P3
21 mar	20:00	Cuba	1–3	Argentina	15–25	13–25	25–18	22–25		75–93	P2 P3

=== Seventh place match ===
Date	Time		Score		Set 1	Set 2	Set 3	Set 4	Set 5	Total	Report
22 mar	14:00	Chile	W–O	Costa Rica	25–0	25–0	25–0			75–0	P2 P3

=== Fifth place match ===
Date	Time		Score		Set 1	Set 2	Set 3	Set 4	Set 5	Total	Report
22 mar	16:00	Mexico	2–3	Peru	25–27	26–24	25–20	23–25	12–15	111–111	P2 P3

=== Bronze medal match ===
Date	Time		Score		Set 1	Set 2	Set 3	Set 4	Set 5	Total	Report
22 mar	18:00	Puerto Rico	0–3	Cuba	21–25	21–25	16–25			58–75	P2 P3

=== Final ===
Date	Time		Score		Set 1	Set 2	Set 3	Set 4	Set 5	Total	Report
22 mar	20:00	Dominican Republic	2–3	Argentina	25–17	21–25	25–13	23–25	8–15	102–95	P2 P3

== Final standing ==
Rank	Team
1st place, gold medalist(s)	Argentina
2nd place, silver medalist(s)	Dominican Republic
3rd place, bronze medalist(s)	Cuba
4	Puerto Rico
5	Peru
6	Mexico
7	Chile
8	Costa Rica

2015 Girls' Youth Pan-American Cup champions

Argentina
2nd title

== Individual awards ==
- Most valuable player
  - Anahi Tosi (ARG)
- Best setter
  - Azul Benítez (ARG)
- Best Opposite
  - Massiel Matos (DOM)
- Best Outside Hitters
  - Diaris Pérez (CUB)
  - Aidachi Agüero (CUB)
- Best Middle Blockers
  - Lisbeth Rosario (DOM)
  - Diana de la Peña (PER)
- Best libero
  - María Arreola (MEX)
- Best scorer
  - Massiel Matos (DOM)
- Best server
  - Natalia Martínez (DOM)
