= Anahi Tosi =

Argentine volleyball player (born 1998)

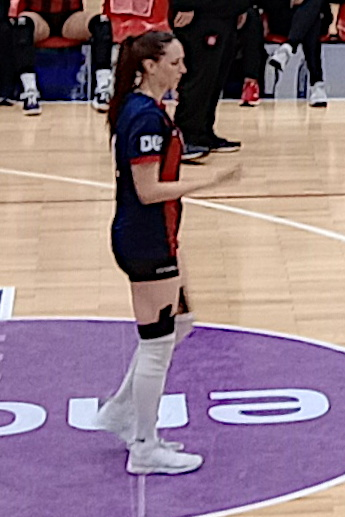
- Tosi playing for San Lorenzo in 2025

Personal information
- Full name: Anahi Florencia Tosi
- Nationality: Argentine
- Born: 10 July 1998 (age 28)
- Height: 181 cm (71 in)
- Weight: 60 kg (132 lb)
- Spike: 290 cm (114 in)
- Block: 272 cm (107 in)

Volleyball information
- Number: 10 (national team)

Career
Years	Teams
2018	Boca Juniors

National team
2018	Argentina

Anahi Tosi (born 10 July 1998) is an Argentine female volleyball player. She is part of the Argentina women's national volleyball team.

She participated in the 2015 FIVB Volleyball Girls' U18 World Championship, 2017 FIVB Volleyball Women's U20 World Championship, 2018 FIVB Volleyball Women's World Championship, and 2018 FIVB Volleyball Women's Nations League At club level she played for Boca Juniors in 2018.
