= 2013 FIVB Volleyball Girls' U18 World Championship =

2013 FIVB Girls Youth World Championship
Tournament details
- Host country: Thailand
- Dates: 26 July to 4 August
- Teams: 20
- Venues: 2 (in Nakhon Ratchasima host cities)

Final positions
- Champions: China (4th title)
- Runners-up: United States
- Third place: Brazil
- Fourth place: Peru

Tournament awards
- MVP: (China) Yuan Xinyue

The 2013 Girls Youth Volleyball World Championship was held in Nakhon Ratchasima, Thailand, from 26 July to 4 August 2013. This was the first edition of the tournament that features 20 teams.

== Qualification process ==
Confederation	Method of Qualification	Date	Venue	Vacancies	Qualified
FIVB	Host	March 18, 2012		1	Thailand
NORCECA	2012 NORCECA Youth Championship	August 6 – 11, 2012	Tijuana, Mexico	3	United States; Dominican Republic; Mexico
AVC	2012 Asian Youth Championship	October 12 – 20, 2012	Ziyang, Sichuan, China	3	Japan; China; Chinese Taipei
CSV	2012 South American Youth Championship	November 22 – 26, 2012	Callao, Peru	3	Peru; Brazil; Argentina
CAVB	2013 African Youth Championship	March 25–27, 2013	Egypt	3	Egypt; Tunisia; Algeria
CEV	2013 European Youth Championship	March 29 – April 7, 2013	Kladovo, Serbia; Bar, Montenegro	6	Poland; Italy; Turkey; Serbia; Greece; Slovenia
UPV *	2013 Youth Pan-American Cup	April 27 – May 5, 2013	Guatemala	1	Puerto Rico
Total				20	

* Pan-American Volleyball Union

== Competition formula ==
Pool A	Pool B	Pool C	Pool D
Thailand	China	Brazil	Italy
Serbia	Poland	United States	Turkey
Egypt	Japan	Dominican Republic	Peru
Tunisia	Argentina	Algeria	Mexico
Puerto Rico	Greece	Slovenia	Chinese Taipei

== Venues ==
Arena	Korat Chatchai Hall	Liptapanlop Hall
Picture		
City	Nakhon Ratchasima	Nakhon Ratchasima
Capacity	5,000	2,000

== Preliminary round ==
=== Pool A ===
Pos	Team	Pld	W	L	Pts	SW	SL	SR	SPW	SPL	SPR	Qualification
1	Serbia	4	4	0	12	12	0	MAX	300	194	1.546	Final round
2	Thailand	4	3	1	9	9	5	1.800	326	312	1.045	Final round
3	Puerto Rico	4	2	2	6	7	7	1.000	321	321	1.000	Final round
4	Egypt	4	1	3	3	4	9	0.444	269	301	0.894	Final round
5	Tunisia	4	0	4	0	1	12	0.083	237	355	0.668	

Date	Time		Score		Set 1	Set 2	Set 3	Set 4	Set 5	Total	Report
26 Jul	15:00	Egypt	1–3	Thailand	23–25	21–25	25–22	19–25		88–97	P2P3
26 Jul	17:00	Tunisia	0–3	Serbia	15–25	21–25	7–25			43–75	P2P3
27 Jul	16:00	Puerto Rico	3–1	Tunisia	24–26	25–22	25–17	25–21		99–86	P2P3
27 Jul	18:00	Serbia	3–0	Egypt	25–14	25–14	25–20			75–48	P2P3
28 Jul	16:00	Egypt	0–3	Puerto Rico	16–25	20–25	21–25			57–75	P2P3
28 Jul	18:00	Thailand	0–3	Serbia	17–25	22–25	12–25			51–75	P2P3
29 Jul	16:00	Tunisia	0–3	Egypt	18–25	24–26	12–25			54–76	P2P3
29 Jul	18:00	Puerto Rico	1–3	Thailand	21–25	30–28	21–25	23–25		95–103	P2P3
30 Jul	16:00	Serbia	3–0	Puerto Rico	25–13	25–16	25–23			75–52	P2P3
30 Jul	18:00	Thailand	3–0	Tunisia	25–22	25–20	25–12			75–54	P2P3

=== Pool B ===
Pos	Team	Pld	W	L	Pts	SW	SL	SR	SPW	SPL	SPR	Qualification
1	Japan	4	3	1	8	9	6	1.500	359	322	1.115	Final round
2	Poland	4	3	1	7	9	8	1.125	373	375	0.995	Final round
3	China	4	2	2	7	9	7	1.286	371	318	1.167	Final round
4	Greece	4	1	3	4	7	9	0.778	321	364	0.882	Final round
5	Argentina	4	1	3	4	5	9	0.556	295	340	0.868	

Date	Time		Score		Set 1	Set 2	Set 3	Set 4	Set 5	Total	Report
26 Jul	15:00	Poland	3–2	Greece	20–25	26–28	25–20	28–26	15–10	114–109	P2P3
26 Jul	17:00	Japan	3–2	China	27–25	18–25	24–26	25–20	17–15	111–111	P2P3
27 Jul	16:00	Argentina	3–0	Japan	25–23	34–32	25–21			84–76	P2P3
27 Jul	18:00	China	1–3	Poland	21–25	21–25	25–21	24–26		91–97	P2P3
28 Jul	16:00	Greece	1–3	China	7–25	16–25	25–19	10–25		58–94	P2P3
28 Jul	18:00	Poland	3–2	Argentina	25–23	23–25	24–26	25–14	15–12	112–100	P2P3
29 Jul	16:00	Japan	3–0	Poland	25–15	25–19	25–16			75–50	P2P3
29 Jul	18:00	Argentina	0–3	Greece	15–25	25–27	19–25			59–77	P2P3
30 Jul	16:00	Greece	1–3	Japan	25–22	15–25	16–25	21–25		77–97	P2P3
30 Jul	18:00	China	3–0	Argentina	25–21	25–13	25–18			75–52	P2P3

=== Pool C ===
Pos	Team	Pld	W	L	Pts	SW	SL	SR	SPW	SPL	SPR	Qualification
1	United States	4	3	1	9	10	3	3.333	310	241	1.286	Final round
2	Brazil	4	3	1	9	9	5	1.800	323	273	1.183	Final round
3	Slovenia	4	2	2	6	8	7	1.143	325	317	1.025	Final round
4	Dominican Republic	4	2	2	6	7	7	1.000	324	301	1.076	Final round
5	Algeria	4	0	4	0	0	12	0.000	150	300	0.500	

Date	Time		Score		Set 1	Set 2	Set 3	Set 4	Set 5	Total	Report
26 Jul	10:00	Slovenia	3–0	Algeria	25–6	25–19	25–20			75–45	P2P3
26 Jul	12:00	Brazil	3–1	Dominican Republic	15–25	33–31	25–8	32–30		105–94	P2P3
27 Jul	11:00	Algeria	0–3	Brazil	8–25	15–25	11–25			34–75	P2P3
27 Jul	14:00	United States	1–3	Slovenia	23–25	15–25	25–18	22–25		85–93	P2P3
28 Jul	11:00	Brazil	0–3	United States	17–25	15–25	21–25			53–75	P2P3
28 Jul	14:00	Dominican Republic	3–0	Algeria	25–10	25–14	25–10			75–34	P2P3
29 Jul	11:00	United States	3–0	Dominican Republic	25–21	25–15	25–22			75–58	P2P3
29 Jul	14:00	Slovenia	1–3	Brazil	25–15	19–25	11–25	15–25		70–90	P2P3
30 Jul	11:00	Dominican Republic	3–1	Slovenia	22–25	25–20	25–19	25–23		97–87	P2P3
30 Jul	14:00	Algeria	0–3	United States	12–25	18–25	7–25			37–75	P2P3

=== Pool D ===
Pos	Team	Pld	W	L	Pts	SW	SL	SR	SPW	SPL	SPR	Qualification
1	Turkey	4	3	1	9	9	5	1.800	330	298	1.107	Final round
2	Peru	4	3	1	7	10	7	1.429	381	355	1.073	Final round
3	Italy	4	2	2	7	9	6	1.500	342	283	1.208	Final round
4	Chinese Taipei	4	1	3	4	5	9	0.556	266	308	0.864	Final round
5	Mexico	4	1	3	3	3	9	0.333	213	288	0.740	

Date	Time		Score		Set 1	Set 2	Set 3	Set 4	Set 5	Total	Report
26 Jul	10:00	Peru	3–0	Mexico	25–18	25–18	25–13			75–49	P2P3
26 Jul	12:00	Turkey	3–1	Italy	19–25	25–19	25–17	25–23		94–84	P2P3
27 Jul	11:00	Italy	2–3	Peru	28–26	25–19	20–25	22–25	13–15	108–110	P2P3
27 Jul	14:00	Chinese Taipei	0–3	Turkey	17–25	16–25	23–25			56–75	P2P3
28 Jul	11:00	Peru	3–2	Chinese Taipei	23–25	25–19	25–27	25–20	15–9	113–100	P2P3
28 Jul	14:00	Mexico	0–3	Italy	15–25	12–25	17–25			44–75	P2P3
29 Jul	11:00	Turkey	3–1	Peru	25–22	23–25	25–17	25–19		98–83	P2P3
29 Jul	14:00	Chinese Taipei	3–0	Mexico	25–12	25–19	25–14			75–45	P2P3
30 Jul	11:00	Italy	3–0	Chinese Taipei	25–14	25–10	25–11			75–35	P2P3
30 Jul	14:00	Mexico	3–0	Turkey	25–20	25–22	25–21			75–63	P2P3

== Final round ==
=== Championship Bracket ===
Round of 16
B1	Japan	3
A4	Egypt	0
C2	Brazil	3
D3	Italy	2
B2	Poland	3
A3	Puerto Rico	1
C1	United States	3
D4	Chinese Taipei	0
D1	Turkey	1
C4	Dominican Republic	3
A2	Thailand	0
B3	China	3
D2	Peru	3
C3	Slovenia	0
A1	Serbia	3
B4	Greece	1

Quarterfinals
B1	Japan	0
C2	Brazil	3
B2	Poland	0
C1	United States	3
C4	Dominican Republic	2
B3	China	3
D2	Peru	3
A1	Serbia	2

Semifinals
C2	Brazil	2
C1	United States	3
B3	China	3
D2	Peru	2

Final
C1	United States	0
B3	China	3
Third place
C2	Brazil	3
D2	Peru	0

=== Round of 16 ===
Date	Time		Score		Set 1	Set 2	Set 3	Set 4	Set 5	Total	Report
01 Aug	12:00	Japan	3–0	Egypt	25–11	25–7	25–16			75–34	P2P3
01 Aug	12:00	Brazil	3–2	Italy	18–25	25–14	25–23	22–25	15–7	105–94	P2P3
01 Aug	14:00	Poland	3–1	Puerto Rico	25–21	26–24	22–25	27–25		100–95	P2P3
01 Aug	14:00	United States	3–0	Chinese Taipei	25–19	25–11	25–17			75–47	P2P3
01 Aug	16:00	Turkey	1–3	Dominican Republic	25–16	28–30	18–25	17–25		88–96	P2P3
01 Aug	16:00	Thailand	0–3	China	18–25	5–25	19–25			42–75	P2P3
01 Aug	18:00	Peru	3–0	Slovenia	25–19	25–14	25–21			75–54	P2P3
01 Aug	18:00	Serbia	3–1	Greece	25–22	25–19	20–25	25–16		95–82	P2P3

=== Quarter-finals ===
Date	Time		Score		Set 1	Set 2	Set 3	Set 4	Set 5	Total	Report
02 Aug	12:00	Japan	0–3	Brazil	23–25	22–25	22–25			67–75	P2P3
02 Aug	14:00	Poland	0–3	United States	22–25	20–25	24–26			66–76	P2P3
02 Aug	16:00	Dominican Republic	2–3	China	25–22	25–20	11–25	22–25	6–15	89–107	P2P3
02 Aug	18:00	Peru	3–2	Serbia	16–25	25–22	25–19	21–25	15–8	102–99	P2P3

=== Semi-finals ===
Date	Time		Score		Set 1	Set 2	Set 3	Set 4	Set 5	Total	Report
03 Aug	16:00	Brazil	2–3	United States	25–16	14–25	25–20	17–25	12–15	93–101	P2P3
03 Aug	18:00	China	3–2	Peru	17–25	22–25	25–20	25–19	23–21	112–110	P2P3

=== Bronze medal match ===
Date	Time		Score		Set 1	Set 2	Set 3	Set 4	Set 5	Total	Report
04 Aug	14:00	Brazil	3–0	Peru	25–19	25–23	25–12			75–54	P2P3

=== Gold medal match ===
Date	Time		Score		Set 1	Set 2	Set 3	Set 4	Set 5	Total	Report
04 Aug	16:00	United States	0–3	China	16–25	21–25	23–25			60–75	P2P3

=== 5th–8th places bracket ===
Classification 5–8
B1	Japan	3
B2	Poland	0
C4	Dominican Republic	2
A1	Serbia	3

Classification 5–6
B1	Japan	3
A1	Serbia	2
Classification 7–8
B2	Poland	3
C4	Dominican Republic	1

=== Classification 5th and 8th ===
Date	Time		Score		Set 1	Set 2	Set 3	Set 4	Set 5	Total	Report
03 Aug	12:00	Japan	3–0	Poland	30–28	25–23	26–24			81–75	P2P3
03 Aug	14:00	Dominican Republic	2–3	Serbia	20–25	25–20	12–25	25–23	16–18	98–111	P2P3

=== Classification 7th ===
Date	Time		Score		Set 1	Set 2	Set 3	Set 4	Set 5	Total	Report
04 Aug	10:00	Poland	3–1	Dominican Republic	25–11	19–25	25–16	25–14		94–66	P2P3

=== Classification 5th ===
Date	Time		Score		Set 1	Set 2	Set 3	Set 4	Set 5	Total	Report
04 Aug	12:00	Japan	3–2	Serbia	14–25	23–25	25–20	25–15	15–13	102–98	P2P3

=== 9th–16th places bracket ===
9th-16th
A4	Egypt	0
D3	Italy	3
A3	Puerto Rico	2
D4	Chinese Taipei	3
D1	Turkey	3
A2	Thailand	0
C3	Slovenia	1
B4	Greece	3

9th-12th
D3	Italy	3
D4	Chinese Taipei	0
D1	Turkey	3
B4	Greece	1

9th-10th
D3	Italy	2
D1	Turkey	3
11th-12th
D4	Chinese Taipei	3
B4	Greece	1

=== 13th and 16th places bracket ===
Classification 13–16
A4	Egypt	1
A3	Puerto Rico	3
A2	Thailand	2
C3	Slovenia	3

Classification 13–14
A3	Puerto Rico	1
C3	Slovenia	3
Classification 15–16
A4	Egypt	3
A2	Thailand	2

=== Classification 9th and 16th ===
Date	Time		Score		Set 1	Set 2	Set 3	Set 4	Set 5	Total	Report
02 Aug	12:00	Egypt	0–3	Italy	23–25	18–25	19–25			60–75	P2P3
02 Aug	14:00	Puerto Rico	2–3	Chinese Taipei	20–25	26–28	25–21	25–18	8–15	104–107	P2P3
02 Aug	16:00	Turkey	3–0	Thailand	25–21	25–15	25–10			75–46	P2P3
02 Aug	18:00	Slovenia	1–3	Greece	19–25	26–24	19–25	18–25		82–99	P2P3

=== Classification 13th and 16th ===
Date	Time		Score		Set 1	Set 2	Set 3	Set 4	Set 5	Total	Report
03 Aug	12:00	Egypt	1–3	Puerto Rico	25–22	24–26	12–25	22–25		83–98	P2P3
03 Aug	14:00	Thailand	2–3	Slovenia	22–25	21–25	25–22	25–20	6–15	99–107	P2P3

=== Classification 9th and 12th ===
Date	Time		Score		Set 1	Set 2	Set 3	Set 4	Set 5	Total	Report
03 Aug	16:00	Italy	3–0	Chinese Taipei	25–23	25–17	25–12			75–52	P2P3
03 Aug	18:00	Turkey	3–1	Greece	17–25	25–12	25–21	25–23		92–81	P2P3

=== Classification 15th ===
Date	Time		Score		Set 1	Set 2	Set 3	Set 4	Set 5	Total	Report
04 Aug	10:00	Egypt	3–2	Thailand	20–25	25–21	25–20	18–25	15–8	103–99	P2P3

=== Classification 13th ===
Date	Time		Score		Set 1	Set 2	Set 3	Set 4	Set 5	Total	Report
04 Aug	12:00	Puerto Rico	1–3	Slovenia	17–25	25–27	26–24	24–26		92–102	P2P3

=== Classification 11th ===
Date	Time		Score		Set 1	Set 2	Set 3	Set 4	Set 5	Total	Report
04 Aug	14:00	Chinese Taipei	3–1	Greece	25–23	25–18	14–25	25–22		89–88	P2P3

=== Classification 9th ===
Date	Time		Score		Set 1	Set 2	Set 3	Set 4	Set 5	Total	Report
04 Aug	16:00	Italy	2–3	Turkey	22–25	21–25	25–20	25–18	12–15	105–103	P2P3

=== Classification 17th and 20th ===
Pos	Team	Pld	W	L	Pts	SW	SL	SR	SPW	SPL	SPR
17	Argentina	3	3	0	9	9	1	9.000	250	148	1.689
18	Mexico	3	2	1	6	7	3	2.333	233	202	1.153
19	Tunisia	3	1	2	3	3	7	0.429	191	228	0.838
20	Algeria	3	0	3	0	1	9	0.111	149	245	0.608

Date	Time		Score		Set 1	Set 2	Set 3	Set 4	Set 5	Total	Report
1 Aug	10:00	Tunisia	0–3	Mexico	23–25	21–25	15–25			59–75	P2P3
1 Aug	10:00	Algeria	0–3	Argentina	9–25	10–25	9–25			28–75	P2P3
2 Aug	10:00	Mexico	3–0	Algeria	25–6	25–18	25–19			75–43	P2P3
2 Aug	10:00	Argentina	3–0	Tunisia	25–14	25–18	25–5			75–37	P2P3
3 Aug	10:00	Mexico	1–3	Argentina	25–27	25–23	17–25	16–25		83–100	P2P3
3 Aug	10:00	Algeria	1–3	Tunisia	25–20	16–25	22–25	15–25		78–95	P2P3

== Final standing ==
Rank	Team
Gold medal	China
Silver medal	United States
Bronze medal	Brazil
4	Peru
5	Japan
6	Serbia
7	Poland
8	Dominican Republic
9	Turkey
10	Italy
11	Chinese Taipei
12	Greece
13	Slovenia
14	Puerto Rico
15	Egypt
16	Thailand
17	Argentina
18	Mexico
19	Tunisia
20	Algeria

2013 FIVB Girls Youth World Championship

China
4th title

Roster
Wang Yunlu, Lin Lin, Du Qingqing, Wang Yuanyuan, Yuan Xinyue, Hu Mingyuan, Ju Wanrong, Sun Haiping (c), Gong Xiangyu, Song Xinyu, Huang Jiayi, Liu Mengyao
Head coach
Dong Ruijun

== All-Star Team ==
- Most valuable player
  - Yuan Xinyue (CHN)
- Best Middle Blockers
  - Yuan Xinyue (CHN)
  - Audriana Fitzmorris (USA)
- Best Opposite
  - Angela Leyva (PER)
- Best setter
  - Jordyn Poulter (USA)
- Best Outside Hitters
  - Brayelin Martinez (DOM)
  - Wang Yunlu (CHN)
- Best libero
  - Minori Wada (JPN)

== See also ==
- 2013 FIVB Boys Youth World Championship
