= 2013 Liga Nacional Juvenil de Voleibol Femenino =

The 2013 Liga Nacional Juvenil de Voleibol Femenino (Spanish for: 2013 Women's Junior National Volleyball League) or 2013 LNJVF is the 3rd edition of the Peruvian Volleyball League in the junior category (U19). The competition is open for all 12 teams who have the A1 category in the LNSV, for this season 11 out of the 12 teams signed up. Teams were made up of U19 players.

== Competing teams ==
Teams were seeded according to how they finished in the 2013 Youth Edition.

Group A	Group B
Sporting Cristal (SCR) (1); Túpac Amaru (TUP) (3); Divino Maestro (CDM) (5); Wanka (DWK) (8); Universidad César Vallejo (USV) (9); Regatas Lima (CRL) (11)	Géminis (GEM) (2); Universidad San Martín (USM) (3); Circolo Sportivo Italiano (CSI) (6); Alianza Lima (ALI) (7); Latino Amisa (CLA) (10)

== Competition format ==
The competition is divided in two phases, the group round in which teams are divided into two groups and they will play once against the other teams in the same pool, after the first round is finished, the top three teams will move on to the next round. The final round is a single round-robyn with all six teams playing one against the other 5, including the teams that had already played each other in the group round, the top team ranking wise will be named champion.

== Individual awards ==
- Most valuable player
  - Milagros Rodríguez (Géminis)
- Best Outside Hitters
  - Hilary Palma (Sporting Cristal)
  - Ángela Leyva (Universidad San Martín)
- Best Opposite
  - Milagros Rodríguez (Géminis)
- Best Middle-Blockers
  - Coraima Gómez (Alianza Lima)
  - Andrea Urrutia (Universidad San Martín)
- Best setter
  - Shiamara Almeida (Sporting Cristal)
- Best libero
  - Violeta Delgado (Géminis)
