= 2015 FIVB Volleyball Women's U20 World Championship squads =

This article shows the rosters of all participating teams at the Women's U20 World Championship 2015 in Puerto Rico.

== Pool A ==
=== Russia ===
The following is the Russian roster in the 2015 FIVB Volleyball Women's U20 World Championship.

Head Coach: Petr Kobrin

No.	Name	Date of birth	Height	Weight	Spike	Block	2015 club
1	Angelina Lazarenko	13 April 1998	1.93 m (6 ft 4 in)	77 kg (170 lb)	317 cm (125 in)	302 cm (119 in)	(Russia) Luch
3	Svetlana Serbina	15 May 1996	1.82 m (6 ft 0 in)	71 kg (157 lb)	295 cm (116 in)	284 cm (112 in)	(Russia) Yenisey
4	Ekaterina Shkurikhina	17 June 1996	1.90 m (6 ft 3 in)	72 kg (159 lb)	306 cm (120 in)	296 cm (117 in)	(Russia) Zarechie
6	Kristina Kurnosova	17 June 1997	1.76 m (5 ft 9 in)	62 kg (137 lb)	288 cm (113 in)	278 cm (109 in)	(Russia) Dynamo Moscow
7	Ekaterina Novikova	7 December 1996	1.81 m (5 ft 11 in)	70 kg (150 lb)	290 cm (110 in)	275 cm (108 in)	(Russia) Severyanka
9	Victoria Zhurbenko	17 March 1996	1.86 m (6 ft 1 in)	67 kg (148 lb)	306 cm (120 in)	297 cm (117 in)	(Russia) Proton
10	Angelina Sperskaite (C)	11 February 1997	1.88 m (6 ft 2 in)	72 kg (159 lb)	305 cm (120 in)	295 cm (116 in)	(Russia) Zarechie
12	Anastasiia Barchuk	9 February 1996	1.87 m (6 ft 2 in)	78 kg (172 lb)	305 cm (120 in)	297 cm (117 in)	(Russia) Zarechie
13	Anastasiia Cheremisina	14 January 1996	1.87 m (6 ft 2 in)	80 kg (180 lb)	305 cm (120 in)	298 cm (117 in)	(Russia) Uralochka
15	Anna Lazareva	31 January 1997	1.90 m (6 ft 3 in)	67 kg (148 lb)	315 cm (124 in)	300 cm (120 in)	(Russia) Dynamo Moscow
17	Tatiana Iurinskaia	25 January 1996	1.95 m (6 ft 5 in)	69 kg (152 lb)	305 cm (120 in)	275 cm (108 in)	(Russia) Dinamo Krasnodar
20	Sabina Gilfanova	14 February 1996	1.87 m (6 ft 2 in)	79 kg (174 lb)	300 cm (120 in)	296 cm (117 in)	(Russia) Dinamo Kazan

=== Bulgaria ===
The following is the Bulgarian roster in the 2015 FIVB Volleyball Women's U20 World Championship.

Head Coach: Ivan Petkov

No.	Name	Date of birth	Height	Weight	Spike	Block	2015 club
2	Slavena Nikova	7 June 1996	1.80 m (5 ft 11 in)	72 kg (159 lb)	290 cm (110 in)	280 cm (110 in)	(Bulgaria) CSKA
3	Elitsa Barakova	11 March 1997	1.84 m (6 ft 0 in)	60 kg (130 lb)	290 cm (110 in)	280 cm (110 in)	(Bulgaria) Kazanlak
4	Polina Neykova	7 October 1998	1.82 m (6 ft 0 in)	73 kg (161 lb)	287 cm (113 in)	280 cm (110 in)	(Bulgaria) CSKA
5	Simona Nikolova	29 July 1997	1.90 m (6 ft 3 in)	75 kg (165 lb)	308 cm (121 in)	300 cm (120 in)	(Bulgaria) Maritza
6	Iveta Stanchulova (C)	11 August 1997	1.86 m (6 ft 1 in)	72 kg (159 lb)	290 cm (110 in)	285 cm (112 in)	(Bulgaria) CSKA
9	Vangeliya Rachkovska	19 July 1997	1.85 m (6 ft 1 in)	67 kg (148 lb)	296 cm (117 in)	281 cm (111 in)	(Bulgaria) Maritza
10	Gergana Dimitrova	28 February 1996	1.84 m (6 ft 0 in)	71 kg (157 lb)	305 cm (120 in)	288 cm (113 in)	(Bulgaria) Sm'Aesch
12	Miroslava Paskova	16 February 1996	1.80 m (5 ft 11 in)	67 kg (148 lb)	299 cm (118 in)	280 cm (110 in)	(Bulgaria) Levski
13	Kristiana Petrova	13 July 1997	1.77 m (5 ft 10 in)	70 kg (150 lb)	290 cm (110 in)	282 cm (111 in)	(Bulgaria) Levski
14	Radostina Marinova	2 October 1998	1.83 m (6 ft 0 in)	62 kg (137 lb)	287 cm (113 in)	279 cm (110 in)	(Bulgaria) Maritza
15	Zhana Todorova	6 January 1997	1.70 m (5 ft 7 in)	56 kg (123 lb)	271 cm (107 in)	255 cm (100 in)	(Bulgaria) Maritza
19	Mirela Shahpazova	28 October 1997	1.75 m (5 ft 9 in)	65 kg (143 lb)	280 cm (110 in)	270 cm (110 in)	(Bulgaria) Maritza

=== Cuba ===
The following is the Cuban roster in the 2015 FIVB Volleyball Women's U20 World Championship.

Head Coach: Wilfredo Robinson Pupo

No.	Name	Date of birth	Height	Weight	Spike	Block	2015 club
1	Dalila Palma	18 November 1999	1.82 m (6 ft 0 in)	62 kg (137 lb)	301 cm (119 in)	285 cm (112 in)	(Cuba) Cienfuegos
5	Laura Suarez	13 December 1998	1.85 m (6 ft 1 in)	75 kg (165 lb)	304 cm (120 in)	292 cm (115 in)	(Cuba) Pinar Del Río
6	Aidachi Aguero	19 March 1999	1.77 m (5 ft 10 in)	69 kg (152 lb)	304 cm (120 in)	295 cm (116 in)	(Cuba) Camaguey
7	Claudia Hernández	9 January 1997	1.81 m (5 ft 11 in)	78 kg (172 lb)	225 cm (89 in)	223 cm (88 in)	(Cuba) La Bahana
8	Diaris Perez (C)	16 November 1998	1.82 m (6 ft 0 in)	75 kg (165 lb)	304 cm (120 in)	295 cm (116 in)	(Cuba) Havana
10	Kitania Medina	24 February 1999	1.86 m (6 ft 1 in)	77 kg (170 lb)	308 cm (121 in)	295 cm (116 in)	(Cuba) Havana
12	Ailama Cese	29 October 2000	1.88 m (6 ft 2 in)	58 kg (128 lb)	322 cm (127 in)	308 cm (121 in)	(Cuba) Mayabeque
13	Liset Herrera	6 December 1998	1.92 m (6 ft 4 in)	70 kg (150 lb)	311 cm (122 in)	300 cm (120 in)	(Cuba) Matanzas
14	Anaila Martinez	20 March 1999	1.84 m (6 ft 0 in)	70 kg (150 lb)	320 cm (130 in)	310 cm (120 in)	(Cuba) Villa Clara
15	Carmela Massip	17 January 1998	1.81 m (5 ft 11 in)	65 kg (143 lb)	304 cm (120 in)	295 cm (116 in)	(Cuba) Sancti Spiritus
16	Sonia Romero	2 August 1997	1.83 m (6 ft 0 in)	70 kg (150 lb)	301 cm (119 in)	288 cm (113 in)	(Cuba) La Habana
18	Anet Alfonso	26 June 1996	1.72 m (5 ft 8 in)	54 kg (119 lb)	225 cm (89 in)	222 cm (87 in)	(Cuba) Camaguey

=== Puerto Rico ===
The following is the Puerto Rican roster in the 2015 FIVB Volleyball Women's U20 World Championship.

Head Coach: Xiomara Molero

No.	Name	Date of birth	Height	Weight	Spike	Block	2015 club
1	Ivania Ortiz	15 July 1999	1.75 m (5 ft 9 in)	78 kg (172 lb)	244 cm (96 in)	235 cm (93 in)	(Puerto Rico) National Team
2	Gabriela Ramos	10 September 1998	1.82 m (6 ft 0 in)	68 kg (150 lb)	243 cm (96 in)	239 cm (94 in)	(Puerto Rico) National Team
4	Dariana Hollingsworth	17 June 1999	1.76 m (5 ft 9 in)	69 kg (152 lb)	236 cm (93 in)	231 cm (91 in)	(Puerto Rico) National Team
5	Karla Santos	28 November 1997	1.89 m (6 ft 2 in)	67 kg (148 lb)	302 cm (119 in)	296 cm (117 in)	(Puerto Rico) National Team
6	Barbara Lopez (C)	2 July 1996	1.78 m (5 ft 10 in)	65 kg (143 lb)	252 cm (99 in)	246 cm (97 in)	(Puerto Rico) National Team
7	Nelmarie Cruz	3 June 1996	1.83 m (6 ft 0 in)	66 kg (146 lb)	299 cm (118 in)	289 cm (114 in)	(Puerto Rico) National Team
8	Andrea Fuentes	12 May 1999	1.85 m (6 ft 1 in)	68 kg (150 lb)	256 cm (101 in)	249 cm (98 in)	(Puerto Rico) National Team
10	Yeaneska Matos	29 April 1996	1.86 m (6 ft 1 in)	68 kg (150 lb)	302 cm (119 in)	297 cm (117 in)	(Puerto Rico) National Team
11	Natalia Peta	5 April 1998	1.85 m (6 ft 1 in)	64 kg (141 lb)	242 cm (95 in)	238 cm (94 in)	(Puerto Rico) National Team
12	Bianca Torres	2 July 1996	1.79 m (5 ft 10 in)	67 kg (148 lb)	258 cm (102 in)	252 cm (99 in)	(Puerto Rico) National Team
14	Janersis Brignoni	30 April 1997	1.82 m (6 ft 0 in)	90 kg (200 lb)	256 cm (101 in)	250 cm (98 in)	(Puerto Rico) National Team
19	Paola Rivera	6 March 1997	1.77 m (5 ft 10 in)	73 kg (161 lb)	235 cm (93 in)	230 cm (91 in)	(Puerto Rico) National Team

== Pool B ==
=== Peru ===
The following is the Peruvian roster in the 2015 FIVB Volleyball Women's U20 World Championship.

Head Coach: Natalia Malaga

No.	Name	Date of birth	Height	Weight	Spike	Block	2015 club
1	Diana De La Peña	7 June 1999	1.87 m (6 ft 2 in)	60 kg (130 lb)	294 cm (116 in)	295 cm (116 in)	(Peru) Géminis
2	Nair Canessa	4 June 1997	1.85 m (6 ft 1 in)	70 kg (150 lb)	295 cm (116 in)	298 cm (117 in)	(Peru) Deportivo Géminis
3	Nicole Abreu	27 March 1999	1.80 m (5 ft 11 in)	63 kg (139 lb)	285 cm (112 in)	270 cm (110 in)	(Peru) Universidad César Vallejo
4	Cristina Cuba	4 June 1996	1.76 m (5 ft 9 in)	65 kg (143 lb)	280 cm (110 in)	275 cm (108 in)	(Peru) Regatas Lima
5	Shiamara Almeida	19 February 1996	1.72 m (5 ft 8 in)	62 kg (137 lb)	286 cm (113 in)	275 cm (108 in)	(Peru) Sporting Cristal
8	Maguilaura Frias	28 May 1997	1.86 m (6 ft 1 in)	71 kg (157 lb)	291 cm (115 in)	280 cm (110 in)	(Peru) Univ. San Martín de Porres
9	Katherine Regalado	11 March 1998	1.87 m (6 ft 2 in)	66 kg (146 lb)	291 cm (115 in)	284 cm (112 in)	(Peru) Alianza Lima
10	Rosa Valiente	26 June 1996	1.83 m (6 ft 0 in)	60 kg (130 lb)	290 cm (110 in)	295 cm (116 in)	(Peru) Alianza Lima
12	Angela Leyva (C)	22 November 1996	1.82 m (6 ft 0 in)	70 kg (150 lb)	315 cm (124 in)	291 cm (115 in)	(Peru) Univ. San Martín de Porres
13	Yomira Villacorta	11 January 1996	1.64 m (5 ft 5 in)	61 kg (134 lb)	265 cm (104 in)	250 cm (98 in)	(Peru) Deportivo Jaamsa
14	Dayana Rojas	9 October 1997	1.60 m (5 ft 3 in)	55 kg (121 lb)	178 cm (70 in)	180 cm (71 in)	(Peru) Deportivo Jaamsa
18	Coraima Gomez	9 August 1996	1.77 m (5 ft 10 in)	70 kg (150 lb)	280 cm (110 in)	275 cm (108 in)	(Peru) Alianza Lima

=== Serbia ===
The following is the Serbian roster in the 2015 FIVB Volleyball Women's U20 World Championship.

Head Coach: Marijana Boričić

No.	Name	Date of birth	Height	Weight	Spike	Block	2015 club
1	Jovana Kocić	24 February 1998	1.90 m (6 ft 3 in)	85 kg (187 lb)	290 cm (110 in)	285 cm (112 in)	(Serbia) Vizura Beograd
2	Aleksandra Ćirović	30 September 1997	1.75 m (5 ft 9 in)	57 kg (126 lb)	285 cm (112 in)	275 cm (108 in)	(Serbia) Vizura Beograd
4	Sara Lozo	29 April 1997	1.86 m (6 ft 1 in)	61 kg (134 lb)	295 cm (116 in)	290 cm (110 in)	(Serbia) Vizura Beograd
5	Katarina Marinković	4 April 1996	1.86 m (6 ft 1 in)	72 kg (159 lb)	298 cm (117 in)	285 cm (112 in)	(Serbia) Radnički Beograd
7	Jelena Vignjević (C)	7 June 1996	1.80 m (5 ft 11 in)	63 kg (139 lb)	285 cm (112 in)	280 cm (110 in)	(Serbia) Tent Obrenovac
8	Maja Aleksić	6 June 1997	1.88 m (6 ft 2 in)	72 kg (159 lb)	290 cm (110 in)	285 cm (112 in)	(Serbia) Vizura Beograd
9	Katarina Lazović	12 September 1999	1.82 m (6 ft 0 in)	62 kg (137 lb)	285 cm (112 in)	275 cm (108 in)	(Serbia) Vizura Beograd
11	Bojana Milenković	6 March 1997	1.85 m (6 ft 1 in)	70 kg (150 lb)	294 cm (116 in)	288 cm (113 in)	(Serbia) Crvena Zvezda Beograd
13	Aleksandra Tadić	24 December 1997	1.74 m (5 ft 9 in)	60 kg (130 lb)	270 cm (110 in)	265 cm (104 in)	(Serbia) Eaton Srem Tempo
14	Sara Vučićević	29 April 1997	1.86 m (6 ft 1 in)	66 kg (146 lb)	287 cm (113 in)	282 cm (111 in)	(Serbia) Tent Obrenovac
16	Milena Dimić	31 August 1997	1.70 m (5 ft 7 in)	64 kg (141 lb)	255 cm (100 in)	250 cm (98 in)	(Serbia) Vizura Beograd
17	Marija Vujnović	11 May 1997	1.82 m (6 ft 0 in)	65 kg (143 lb)	290 cm (110 in)	276 cm (109 in)	(Serbia) Jedinstvo Stara Pazova

=== China ===
The following is the Chinese roster in the 2015 FIVB Volleyball Women's U20 World Championship.

Head Coach: Chen Youquan

No.	Name	Date of birth	Height	Weight	Spike	Block	2015 club
1	Sun Haiping (C)	23 May 1996	1.80 m (5 ft 11 in)	65 kg (143 lb)	300 cm (120 in)	292 cm (115 in)	(China) Liaoning
2	Hu Mingyuan	17 May 1996	1.87 m (6 ft 2 in)	69 kg (152 lb)	305 cm (120 in)	297 cm (117 in)	(China) Liaoning
3	Meng Zixuan	18 November 1996	1.80 m (5 ft 11 in)	62 kg (137 lb)	298 cm (117 in)	290 cm (110 in)	(China) Tianjin
5	Jin Ye	1 March 1996	1.87 m (6 ft 2 in)	77 kg (170 lb)	310 cm (120 in)	302 cm (119 in)	(China) Beijing
6	Du Qingqing	18 December 1996	1.89 m (6 ft 2 in)	72 kg (159 lb)	312 cm (123 in)	300 cm (120 in)	(China) Shandong
7	Zhang Qian	20 February 1997	1.93 m (6 ft 4 in)	70 kg (150 lb)	313 cm (123 in)	302 cm (119 in)	(China) Shandong
8	Huang Jiayi	16 August 1996	1.73 m (5 ft 8 in)	60 kg (130 lb)	285 cm (112 in)	275 cm (108 in)	(China) Shanghai
11	Rong Wanqianbai	1 January 1997	1.84 m (6 ft 0 in)	75 kg (165 lb)	304 cm (120 in)	297 cm (117 in)	(China) Jiangsu
12	Wang Yuanyuan	14 July 1997	1.95 m (6 ft 5 in)	75 kg (165 lb)	312 cm (123 in)	300 cm (120 in)	(China) Tianjin
15	Gong Xiangyu	21 April 1997	1.86 m (6 ft 1 in)	72 kg (159 lb)	313 cm (123 in)	302 cm (119 in)	(China) Jiangsu
19	Zhou Xinyi	17 March 1997	1.87 m (6 ft 2 in)	69 kg (152 lb)	307 cm (121 in)	300 cm (120 in)	(China) Jiangsu
20	Yang Yi	19 March 1997	1.84 m (6 ft 0 in)	70 kg (150 lb)	308 cm (121 in)	300 cm (120 in)	(China) Tianjin

=== Mexico ===
The following is the Mexican roster in the 2015 FIVB Volleyball Women's U20 World Championship.

Head Coach: Luis Leon

No.	Name	Date of birth	Height	Weight	Spike	Block	2015 club
2	Leslie Lopez	13 February 1996	1.69 m (5 ft 7 in)	78 kg (172 lb)	198 cm (78 in)	190 cm (75 in)	(Mexico) Durango
4	Maria Rodriguez	23 June 1997	1.85 m (6 ft 1 in)	80 kg (180 lb)	287 cm (113 in)	280 cm (110 in)	(Mexico) Nuevo Leon
6	Janeth Vargas	25 July 1997	1.69 m (5 ft 7 in)	68 kg (150 lb)	200 cm (79 in)	210 cm (83 in)	(Mexico) Nuevo Leon
7	Maria Aguilera	8 June 1997	1.53 m (5 ft 0 in)	55 kg (121 lb)	260 cm (100 in)	240 cm (94 in)	(Mexico) Nuevo Leon
9	Kathya Garcia	6 March 1998	1.75 m (5 ft 9 in)	68 kg (150 lb)	286 cm (113 in)	275 cm (108 in)	(Mexico) Chihuahua
11	Miriam Bojorquez	14 December 1997	1.64 m (5 ft 5 in)	66 kg (146 lb)	195 cm (77 in)	200 cm (79 in)	(Mexico) Sinaola
12	Montserrat Castro	12 December 1996	1.99 m (6 ft 6 in)	85 kg (187 lb)	270 cm (110 in)	268 cm (106 in)	(Mexico) UNAM
14	Fernanda Bañuelos (C)	19 March 1997	1.86 m (6 ft 1 in)	70 kg (150 lb)	303 cm (119 in)	285 cm (112 in)	(Mexico) Baja California
16	Kitzia Corrales	12 February 1996	1.78 m (5 ft 10 in)	71 kg (157 lb)	0 cm (0 in)	0 cm (0 in)	(Mexico) Sinaola
17	Karina Flores	16 August 1998	1.88 m (6 ft 2 in)	72 kg (159 lb)	293 cm (115 in)	288 cm (113 in)	(Mexico) Nuevo Leon
18	Mitzy Gonzalez	3 August 1997	1.68 m (5 ft 6 in)	75 kg (165 lb)	211 cm (83 in)	209 cm (82 in)	(Mexico) Sinaola
20	Alondra Amaro	9 June 1998	1.88 m (6 ft 2 in)	69 kg (152 lb)	275 cm (108 in)	250 cm (98 in)	(Mexico) Durango

== Pool C ==
=== Italy ===
The following is the Italian roster in the 2015 FIVB Volleyball Women's U20 World Championship.

Head Coach: Luca Cristofani

No.	Name	Date of birth	Height	Weight	Spike	Block	2015 club
1	Ilaria Bonvicini	28 February 1997	1.60 m (5 ft 3 in)	52 kg (115 lb)	261 cm (103 in)	243 cm (96 in)	(Italy) Orago Villa Cortese
3	Carlotta Cambi	28 May 1996	1.77 m (5 ft 10 in)	66 kg (146 lb)	302 cm (119 in)	292 cm (115 in)	(Italy) Bakery Piacenza
6	Sofia D'Odorico (C)	6 January 1997	1.87 m (6 ft 2 in)	78 kg (172 lb)	312 cm (123 in)	302 cm (119 in)	(Italy) Club Italia
8	Alessia Orro	18 July 1998	1.83 m (6 ft 0 in)	74 kg (163 lb)	276 cm (109 in)	260 cm (100 in)	(Italy) Club Italia
9	Sara Bonifacio	3 July 1996	1.88 m (6 ft 2 in)	76 kg (168 lb)	320 cm (130 in)	300 cm (120 in)	(Italy) Igor Volley Novara
11	Anna Danesi	20 April 1996	1.93 m (6 ft 4 in)	75 kg (165 lb)	301 cm (119 in)	284 cm (112 in)	(Italy) Club Italia
12	Anastasia Guerra	15 October 1996	1.87 m (6 ft 2 in)	80 kg (180 lb)	300 cm (120 in)	286 cm (113 in)	(Italy) Club Italia
13	Chiara De Bortoli	28 July 1997	1.80 m (5 ft 11 in)	68 kg (150 lb)	302 cm (119 in)	286 cm (113 in)	(Italy) Volley Pool Piave San Donà
14	Paola Egonu	18 December 1998	1.91 m (6 ft 3 in)	78 kg (172 lb)	332 cm (131 in)	312 cm (123 in)	(Italy) Club Italia
15	Beatrice Berti	12 January 1996	1.93 m (6 ft 4 in)	87 kg (192 lb)	304 cm (120 in)	288 cm (113 in)	(Italy) Club Italia
16	Anna Nicoletti	3 January 1996	1.93 m (6 ft 4 in)	86 kg (190 lb)	306 cm (120 in)	290 cm (110 in)	(Italy) Club Italia
18	Elisa Zanette	17 February 1996	1.93 m (6 ft 4 in)	86 kg (190 lb)	304 cm (120 in)	288 cm (113 in)	(Italy) Igor Gorgonzola Novara

=== Japan ===
The following is the Japanese roster in the 2015 FIVB Volleyball Women's U20 World Championship.

Head Coach: Kiyoshi Abo

No.	Name	Date of birth	Height	Weight	Spike	Block	2015 club
3	Nanami Hirose	12 May 1997	1.77 m (5 ft 10 in)	61 kg (134 lb)	301 cm (119 in)	295 cm (116 in)	(Japan) Asahikawa-Jitsugyo HS
4	Misaki Shirai	30 July 1996	1.75 m (5 ft 9 in)	70 kg (150 lb)	293 cm (115 in)	278 cm (109 in)	(Japan) Toray Arrows
5	Yurika Kono	8 April 1996	1.77 m (5 ft 10 in)	60 kg (130 lb)	292 cm (115 in)	282 cm (111 in)	(Japan) Okayama Seagulls
8	Yuka Kitsui	15 January 1997	1.72 m (5 ft 8 in)	60 kg (130 lb)	294 cm (116 in)	283 cm (111 in)	(Japan) JT Marvelous
9	Haruka Maruo	15 August 1996	1.76 m (5 ft 9 in)	64 kg (141 lb)	293 cm (115 in)	283 cm (111 in)	(Japan) University of Tsukuba
11	Haruka Kanamori	9 April 1996	1.76 m (5 ft 9 in)	64 kg (141 lb)	296 cm (117 in)	286 cm (113 in)	(Japan) Hisamitsu Springs
12	Moeri Hanai	17 April 1997	1.67 m (5 ft 6 in)	60 kg (130 lb)	280 cm (110 in)	272 cm (107 in)	(Japan) Kyoei Gakuen Senior HS
13	Mizuki Yanagita (C)	26 March 1996	1.68 m (5 ft 6 in)	64 kg (141 lb)	300 cm (120 in)	290 cm (110 in)	(Japan) NEC Red Rockets
14	Yuka Onodera	22 March 1997	1.73 m (5 ft 8 in)	70 kg (150 lb)	293 cm (115 in)	283 cm (111 in)	(Japan) Hitachi Rivale
15	Shino Nakata	15 July 1997	1.78 m (5 ft 10 in)	66 kg (146 lb)	287 cm (113 in)	284 cm (112 in)	(Japan) Akita Kita HS
17	Kaori Mabashi	18 November 1996	1.73 m (5 ft 8 in)	63 kg (139 lb)	296 cm (117 in)	286 cm (113 in)	(Japan) Hitachi Rivale
19	Anna Koike	16 December 1996	1.62 m (5 ft 4 in)	62 kg (137 lb)	263 cm (104 in)	253 cm (100 in)	(Japan) Hitachi Rivale

=== Chinese Taipei ===
The following is the Taiwanese roster in the 2015 FIVB Volleyball Women's U20 World Championship.

Head Coach: Kuang Chin-Tu

No.	Name	Date of birth	Height	Weight	Spike	Block	2015 club
2	Lo Yi Ching	16 September 1997	1.60 m (5 ft 3 in)	57 kg (126 lb)	270 cm (110 in)	280 cm (110 in)	Chinese Taipei
4	Huang Chen Yu	25 February 1998	1.78 m (5 ft 10 in)	56 kg (123 lb)	300 cm (120 in)	290 cm (110 in)	Chinese Taipei
5	Kuo Ching-Yi	17 February 1996	1.66 m (5 ft 5 in)	57 kg (126 lb)	280 cm (110 in)	270 cm (110 in)	Chinese Taipei
7	Lin Miao Hua	8 April 1996	1.56 m (5 ft 1 in)	55 kg (121 lb)	260 cm (100 in)	250 cm (98 in)	Chinese Taipei
11	Chang Li Ting	12 February 1996	1.76 m (5 ft 9 in)	67 kg (148 lb)	280 cm (110 in)	275 cm (108 in)	Chinese Taipei
12	Chang Yu Chia	27 January 1996	1.72 m (5 ft 8 in)	67 kg (148 lb)	275 cm (108 in)	265 cm (104 in)	Chinese Taipei
14	Lee Yu (C)	15 June 1996	1.75 m (5 ft 9 in)	69 kg (152 lb)	280 cm (110 in)	275 cm (108 in)	Chinese Taipei
16	Chen Tzu Ya	26 August 1997	1.77 m (5 ft 10 in)	62 kg (137 lb)	276 cm (109 in)	266 cm (105 in)	Chinese Taipei
17	Hung Ching Chun	8 August 1996	1.85 m (6 ft 1 in)	75 kg (165 lb)	290 cm (110 in)	275 cm (108 in)	Chinese Taipei
18	Yu Chin-Feng	14 September 1996	1.74 m (5 ft 9 in)	63 kg (139 lb)	285 cm (112 in)	275 cm (108 in)	Chinese Taipei
19	Tseng Wan-Ling	13 May 1996	1.71 m (5 ft 7 in)	67 kg (148 lb)	295 cm (116 in)	285 cm (112 in)	Chinese Taipei
20	Huang Ching Hsuan	16 November 1998	1.80 m (5 ft 11 in)	64 kg (141 lb)	305 cm (120 in)	300 cm (120 in)	Chinese Taipei

=== Egypt ===
The following is the Egyptian roster in the 2015 FIVB Volleyball Women's U20 World Championship.

Head Coach: Ahmed Fathi

No.	Name	Date of birth	Height	Weight	Spike	Block	2015 club
1	Mayar Mohamed	5 February 2000	1.86 m (6 ft 1 in)	78 kg (172 lb)	288 cm (113 in)	279 cm (110 in)	(Egypt) Al Ahly
4	Mai Moustafa (C)	1 October 1996	1.75 m (5 ft 9 in)	63 kg (139 lb)	280 cm (110 in)	260 cm (100 in)	(Egypt) Delfi
5	Salma Mahmoud	4 February 1999	1.75 m (5 ft 9 in)	56 kg (123 lb)	286 cm (113 in)	275 cm (108 in)	(Egypt) Al Ahly
6	Nourallah Amin	25 November 2000	1.86 m (6 ft 1 in)	70 kg (150 lb)	286 cm (113 in)	275 cm (108 in)	(Egypt) Al Ahly
7	Malak Badawy	17 June 1996	1.75 m (5 ft 9 in)	64 kg (141 lb)	273 cm (107 in)	289 cm (114 in)	(Egypt) Sporting
8	Mariam Ebrahim	13 March 1997	1.67 m (5 ft 6 in)	63 kg (139 lb)	273 cm (107 in)	261 cm (103 in)	(Egypt) Al Shams
9	Rahma Almohandes	9 November 1996	1.75 m (5 ft 9 in)	63 kg (139 lb)	277 cm (109 in)	265 cm (104 in)	(Egypt) Al Ahly
10	Yasmin Hussein	11 January 1997	1.75 m (5 ft 9 in)	74 kg (163 lb)	188 cm (74 in)	178 cm (70 in)	(Egypt) Sporting
11	Hend Farag	29 September 1997	1.86 m (6 ft 1 in)	68 kg (150 lb)	277 cm (109 in)	272 cm (107 in)	(Egypt) Al Said
12	Icel Nadim	19 February 1996	1.62 m (5 ft 4 in)	52 kg (115 lb)	253 cm (100 in)	267 cm (105 in)	(Egypt) Al Shams
16	Jailan Tawfik	12 June 1997	1.75 m (5 ft 9 in)	65 kg (143 lb)	292 cm (115 in)	279 cm (110 in)	(Egypt) Al Said
18	Rania Ashmawy	20 February 1996	1.74 m (5 ft 9 in)	67 kg (148 lb)	273 cm (107 in)	264 cm (104 in)	(Egypt) Zamalek

== Pool D ==
=== Dominican Republic ===
The following is the Dominican roster in the 2015 FIVB Volleyball Women's U20 World Championship.

Head Coach: Wagner Pacheco

No.	Name	Date of birth	Height	Weight	Spike	Block	2015 club
1	Jineiry Martínez	3 December 1997	1.90 m (6 ft 3 in)	68 kg (150 lb)	305 cm (120 in)	280 cm (110 in)	(Dominican Republic) Mirador
3	Gaila González	25 June 1997	1.88 m (6 ft 2 in)	73 kg (161 lb)	304 cm (120 in)	276 cm (109 in)	(Dominican Republic) Mirador
4	Vielka Peralta	13 April 1999	1.76 m (5 ft 9 in)	56 kg (123 lb)	275 cm (108 in)	242 cm (95 in)	(Dominican Republic) Deportivo Nacional
7	María García	4 July 1996	1.84 m (6 ft 0 in)	71 kg (157 lb)	296 cm (117 in)	265 cm (104 in)	(Dominican Republic) Mirador
8	Natalia Martínez	25 November 2000	1.86 m (6 ft 1 in)	71 kg (157 lb)	300 cm (120 in)	275 cm (108 in)	(Dominican Republic) Mirador
9	Angelica Hinojosa	19 January 1997	1.86 m (6 ft 1 in)	72 kg (159 lb)	305 cm (120 in)	279 cm (110 in)	(Dominican Republic) Cien Fuego
12	Ayleen Rivero	19 May 1997	1.80 m (5 ft 11 in)	67 kg (148 lb)	240 cm (94 in)	231 cm (91 in)	(Dominican Republic) Deportivo Nacional
13	Massiel Matos	16 April 1998	1.84 m (6 ft 0 in)	66 kg (146 lb)	300 cm (120 in)	292 cm (115 in)	(Dominican Republic) Higuey
14	Yokaty Pérez	6 August 1998	1.78 m (5 ft 10 in)	79 kg (174 lb)	291 cm (115 in)	257 cm (101 in)	(Dominican Republic) Los Cachorros
17	Larysmer Martínez	18 October 1996	1.74 m (5 ft 9 in)	68 kg (150 lb)	288 cm (113 in)	253 cm (100 in)	(Dominican Republic) Deportivo Nacional
19	Lisbeth Rosario	26 May 1999	1.80 m (5 ft 11 in)	73 kg (161 lb)	273 cm (107 in)	265 cm (104 in)	(Dominican Republic) Deportivo Nacional
20	Brayelin Martínez (C)	11 September 1996	2.01 m (6 ft 7 in)	83 kg (183 lb)	330 cm (130 in)	320 cm (130 in)	(Dominican Republic) Deportivo Nacional

=== Brazil ===
The following is the Brazilian roster in the 2015 FIVB Volleyball Women's U20 World Championship.

Head Coach: Mauricio Thomas

No.	Name	Date of birth	Height	Weight	Spike	Block	2015 club
1	Drussyla Costa	1 July 1996	1.82 m (6 ft 0 in)	76 kg (168 lb)	298 cm (117 in)	284 cm (112 in)	(Brazil) Rexona-Ades
2	Lana Conceição (C)	8 December 1996	1.75 m (5 ft 9 in)	72 kg (159 lb)	292 cm (115 in)	281 cm (111 in)	(Brazil) E C Pinheiros
4	Ariane Pinto	27 January 1997	1.91 m (6 ft 3 in)	79 kg (174 lb)	291 cm (115 in)	284 cm (112 in)	(Brazil) Bradesco
5	Laiza Ferreira	18 February 1996	1.81 m (5 ft 11 in)	71 kg (157 lb)	301 cm (119 in)	285 cm (112 in)	(Brazil) Bradesco
6	Gabriela Candido	22 May 1996	1.81 m (5 ft 11 in)	78 kg (172 lb)	288 cm (113 in)	280 cm (110 in)	(Brazil) Rexona-Ades
7	Gabriela Silva	5 March 1996	1.82 m (6 ft 0 in)	75 kg (165 lb)	296 cm (117 in)	281 cm (111 in)	(Brazil) Varginha
8	Karoline Tormena	21 March 1996	1.89 m (6 ft 2 in)	63 kg (139 lb)	297 cm (117 in)	287 cm (113 in)	(Brazil) Minas Tênis Clube
11	Lorenne Geraldo Teixeira	8 January 1996	1.87 m (6 ft 2 in)	76 kg (168 lb)	301 cm (119 in)	285 cm (112 in)	(Brazil) Rexona-Ades
12	Thais Oliveira	1 April 1996	1.72 m (5 ft 8 in)	69 kg (152 lb)	275 cm (108 in)	272 cm (107 in)	(Brazil) SESI - SP
13	Lais Vasques	12 February 1996	1.72 m (5 ft 8 in)	69 kg (152 lb)	268 cm (106 in)	270 cm (110 in)	(Brazil) Minas Tênis Clube
14	Lyara Medeiros	19 September 1996	1.81 m (5 ft 11 in)	69 kg (152 lb)	288 cm (113 in)	281 cm (111 in)	(Brazil) Bradesco
17	Maiara Basso	3 January 1996	1.86 m (6 ft 1 in)	80 kg (180 lb)	287 cm (113 in)	276 cm (109 in)	(Brazil) Minas Tênis Clube

=== Turkey ===
The following is the Turkish roster in the 2015 FIVB Volleyball Women's U20 World Championship.

Head Coach: Hasan Celik

No.	Name	Date of birth	Height	Weight	Spike	Block	2015 club
1	Melis Yılmaz	28 June 1997	1.65 m (5 ft 5 in)	52 kg (115 lb)	260 cm (100 in)	259 cm (102 in)	(Turkey) Fenerbahçe
3	Cansu Özbay	17 October 1996	1.79 m (5 ft 10 in)	75 kg (165 lb)	285 cm (112 in)	284 cm (112 in)	(Turkey) Beşiktaş
5	Ayça Aykaç	27 February 1996	1.76 m (5 ft 9 in)	54 kg (119 lb)	280 cm (110 in)	279 cm (110 in)	(Turkey) Vakıfbank
6	Rida Erlalelitepe	22 July 1996	1.83 m (6 ft 0 in)	70 kg (150 lb)	293 cm (115 in)	290 cm (110 in)	(Turkey) Eczacıbaşı
7	Ada Germen	24 June 1997	1.82 m (6 ft 0 in)	62 kg (137 lb)	285 cm (112 in)	283 cm (111 in)	(Turkey) Galatasaray
9	Zehra Güneş	7 July 1999	1.94 m (6 ft 4 in)	82 kg (181 lb)	309 cm (122 in)	292 cm (115 in)	(Turkey) Vakıfbank
10	Hümay Topaloğlu	3 August 1996	1.80 m (5 ft 11 in)	63 kg (139 lb)	295 cm (116 in)	293 cm (115 in)	(Turkey) Yeşilyurt
11	Yağmur Kılıç	30 March 1996	1.89 m (6 ft 2 in)	66 kg (146 lb)	283 cm (111 in)	280 cm (110 in)	(Turkey) Galatasaray
13	Cemre Erkul	12 January 1997	1.84 m (6 ft 0 in)	65 kg (143 lb)	298 cm (117 in)	295 cm (116 in)	(Turkey) Eczacıbaşı
15	Arelya Karasoy (C)	14 December 1996	1.81 m (5 ft 11 in)	73 kg (161 lb)	287 cm (113 in)	280 cm (110 in)	(Turkey) Eczacıbaşı
16	Nazl Alkan	12 September 1996	1.86 m (6 ft 1 in)	74 kg (163 lb)	285 cm (112 in)	284 cm (112 in)	(Turkey) Beşiktaş
17	Su Zent	25 March 1996	1.84 m (6 ft 0 in)	70 kg (150 lb)	305 cm (120 in)	303 cm (119 in)	(Turkey) Galatasaray

=== Czech Republic ===
The following is the Czechs roster in the 2015 FIVB Volleyball Women's U20 World Championship.

Head Coach: Ales Novak

No.	Name	Date of birth	Height	Weight	Spike	Block	2015 club
2	Daniela Cerna	12 September 1998	1.84 m (6 ft 0 in)	74 kg (163 lb)	312 cm (123 in)	305 cm (120 in)	(Czech Republic) Ceske Budejovice
3	Eva Valentova	3 March 1998	1.74 m (5 ft 9 in)	73 kg (161 lb)	274 cm (108 in)	265 cm (104 in)	(Czech Republic) Ceske Budejovice
4	Veronika Jandova	11 June 1998	1.86 m (6 ft 1 in)	74 kg (163 lb)	306 cm (120 in)	297 cm (117 in)	(Czech Republic) Olymp Praha
6	Klara Mikelova	3 April 1998	1.82 m (6 ft 0 in)	76 kg (168 lb)	293 cm (115 in)	285 cm (112 in)	(Czech Republic) Královo Pole
9	Anna Sucha	28 April 1998	1.81 m (5 ft 11 in)	83 kg (183 lb)	290 cm (110 in)	280 cm (110 in)	(Czech Republic) Královo Pole
10	Gabriela Kopacova	24 June 1998	1.85 m (6 ft 1 in)	70 kg (150 lb)	310 cm (120 in)	303 cm (119 in)	(Czech Republic) Královo Pole
11	Marie Kurkova	20 May 1996	1.81 m (5 ft 11 in)	75 kg (165 lb)	290 cm (110 in)	284 cm (112 in)	(Czech Republic) Olymp Praha
16	Sarah Cruz	8 March 1998	1.84 m (6 ft 0 in)	65 kg (143 lb)	296 cm (117 in)	286 cm (113 in)	(Czech Republic) VK Prostějov
17	Tiziana Baumrukova (C)	29 April 1998	1.75 m (5 ft 9 in)	69 kg (152 lb)	281 cm (111 in)	271 cm (107 in)	(Czech Republic) Olymp Praha
18	Pavlina Simanova	5 April 1996	1.86 m (6 ft 1 in)	80 kg (180 lb)	295 cm (116 in)	287 cm (113 in)	(Czech Republic) Olymp Praha
19	Lucie Nova	3 May 1996	1.84 m (6 ft 0 in)	68 kg (150 lb)	302 cm (119 in)	295 cm (116 in)	(Czech Republic) Olymp Praha
20	Lucie Kalhousova	14 May 1996	1.85 m (6 ft 1 in)	80 kg (180 lb)	300 cm (120 in)	292 cm (115 in)	(Czech Republic) Olymp Praha

== See also ==
- 2015 FIVB Volleyball Men's U21 World Championship squads
