= 2012 Girls' Youth South American Volleyball Championship =

Tournament details
- Host country: Peru
- Dates: 22 – 26 November
- Teams: 8
- Venue: 1 (in Callao host cities)

Final positions
- Champions: Peru (3rd title)

Tournament awards
- MVP: Ángela Leyva (PER)

The 2012 Girls' Youth South American Volleyball Championship was the 18th edition of the tournament, organised by South America's governing volleyball body, the Confederación Sudamericana de Voleibol (CSV). It was determined February 26, 2011 the Peru would be the host. The top three teams qualified for the 2013 Youth World Championship.

== Competing nations ==
The following national teams participated in the tournament, teams were seeded according to how they finished in the previous edition of the tournament with host Peru being seeded first:

Pool A	Pool B
Peru (Host & 3rd); Chile (4th); Colombia (5th); Paraguay (8th)	Brazil (1st); Argentina (2nd); Venezuela (6th); Uruguay

== First round ==
- Venue: Coliseo Miguel Grau, Callao, Peru
- All times are Peruvian Standard Time (UTC−05:00)

=== Pool A ===
Pos	Team	Pld	W	L	Pts	SW	SL	SR	SPW	SPL	SPR	Qualification
1	Peru	3	3	0	9	9	0	MAX	225	127	1.772	Semifinals
2	Chile	3	2	1	6	6	4	1.500	219	192	1.141	Semifinals
3	Colombia	3	1	2	3	4	6	0.667	199	201	0.990	
4	Paraguay	3	0	3	0	0	9	0.000	102	225	0.453	

Date	Time		Score		Set 1	Set 2	Set 3	Set 4	Set 5	Total
22 Nov	18:00	Peru	3–0	Paraguay	25–6	25–11	25–21			75–38
22 Nov	20:00	Chile	3–1	Colombia	25–22	25–17	23–25	25–17		98–81
23 Nov	18:00	Peru	3–0	Colombia	25–14	25–21	25–8			75–43
23 Nov	20:00	Chile	3–0	Paraguay	25–11	25–14	25–11			75–36
24 Nov	18:00	Peru	3–0	Chile	25–15	25–9	25–22			75–46
24 Nov	20:00	Paraguay	0–3	Colombia	16–25	6–25	6–25			28–75

=== Pool B ===
Pos	Team	Pld	W	L	Pts	SW	SL	SR	SPW	SPL	SPR	Qualification
1	Brazil	3	3	0	9	9	0	MAX	226	176	1.284	Semifinals
2	Argentina	3	2	1	6	6	3	2.000	210	154	1.364	Semifinals
3	Venezuela	3	1	2	3	3	6	0.500	169	189	0.894	
4	Uruguay	3	0	3	0	0	9	0.000	139	225	0.618	

Date	Time		Score		Set 1	Set 2	Set 3	Set 4	Set 5	Total
22 Nov	14:00	Brazil	3–0	Uruguay	25–16	25–21	25–19			75–56
22 Nov	16:00	Venezuela	0–3	Argentina	11–25	9–25	14–25			34–75
23 Nov	14:00	Argentina	3–0	Uruguay	25–12	25–18	25–15			75–45
23 Nov	16:00	Venezuela	0–3	Brazil	18–25	18–25	24–26			60–76
24 Nov	14:00	Uruguay	0–3	Venezuela	13–25	10–25	15–25			38–75
24 Nov	16:00	Brazil	3–0	Argentina	25–14	25–23	25–23			75–60

== Final round ==
=== 5th to 8th places bracket ===
5th to 8th Classification
2012-11-25 – Callao
Colombia	3
Uruguay	1
2012-11-25 – Callao
Venezuela	3
Paraguay	0

5th place match
2012-11-26 – Callao
Colombia	3
Venezuela	1
7th place match
2012-11-26 – Callao
Uruguay	3
Paraguay	0

=== Championship bracket ===
Semifinal
2012-11-25 – Callao
Peru	3
Argentina	2
2012-11-25 – Callao
Brazil	3
Chile	0

1st place match
2012-11-26 – Callao
Peru	3
Brazil	2
3rd place match
2012-11-26 – Callao
Argentina	3
Chile	0

=== 5th to 8th classification ===
Date	Time		Score		Set 1	Set 2	Set 3	Set 4	Set 5	Total
25 Nov	14:00	Colombia	3–1	Uruguay	25–16	25–21	20–25	25–11		85–73
25 Nov	20:00	Venezuela	3–0	Paraguay	25–16	25–13	25–17			75–46

=== Semifinals ===
Date	Time		Score		Set 1	Set 2	Set 3	Set 4	Set 5	Total
25 Nov	16:00	Brazil	3–0	Chile	25–12	25–12	25–17			75–41
25 Nov	18:00	Peru	3–2	Argentina	25–20	25–12	20–25	24–26	15–9	109–92

=== 7th place match ===
Date	Time		Score		Set 1	Set 2	Set 3	Set 4	Set 5	Total
26 Nov	12:00	Uruguay	3–0	Paraguay	25–16	25–21	25–12			75–49

=== 5th place match ===
Date	Time		Score		Set 1	Set 2	Set 3	Set 4	Set 5	Total
26 Nov	14:00	Colombia	3–1	Venezuela	25–20	25–22	23–25	25–22		98–89

=== 3rd place match ===
Date	Time		Score		Set 1	Set 2	Set 3	Set 4	Set 5	Total
26 Nov	16:00	Argentina	3–0	Chile	25–10	25–11	25–14			75–35

=== Final ===
Date	Time		Score		Set 1	Set 2	Set 3	Set 4	Set 5	Total
26 Nov	18:00	Peru	3–2	Brazil	25–18	18–25	25–20	23–25	15–10	106–98

== Final standing ==
Rank	Team
1st place, gold medalist(s)	Peru
2nd place, silver medalist(s)	Brazil
3rd place, bronze medalist(s)	Argentina
4	Chile
5	Colombia
6	Venezuela
7	Uruguay
8	Paraguay

Qualified for the 2013 Youth World Championship

2012 Girls' Youth South American Volleyball Championship

Peru
3rd title

Team Roster: Luciana del Valle, Hilary Palma, Yomira Villacorta(L), Cristina Cuba, Shiamara Almeida, Violeta Delgado(L), Diana Torres, Maguilaura Frias, Barbara Briceño, Rosa Valiente, Andrea Urrutia, Ángela Leyva(C), Head Coach: Natalia Málaga

== Individual awards ==
- Most valuable player
  - Ángela Leyva (PER)
- Best spiker
  - Ángela Leyva (PER)
- Best blocker
  - Rosa Valiente (PER)
- Best server
  - Catalina Melo (CHI)
- Best digger
  - Laís Vasques (BRA)
- Best setter
  - Manuela Vargas (COL)
- Best receiver
  - Isis Francesco (VEN)
- Best libero
  - Laís Vasques (BRA)
