= Hilary Palma =

Peruvian volleyball player

Personal information
- Born: January 5, 1997 (age 29); Trujillo, Peru
- Hometown: Lima
- Height: 1.70 m (5 ft 7 in)
- Weight: 70 kg (154 lb)
- Spike: 281 cm (111 in)
- Block: 280 cm (110 in)

Volleyball information
- Position: Wing spiker
- Current club: Sporting Cristal
- Number: 2

National team
2011 -	Peru
Honours
Women's volleyball
Representing Peru
Junior S. American Championship
Silver medal – second place	2012 Lima	National team
Youth S. American Championship
Gold medal – first place	2012 Callao	National team
U16 S. American Championship
Silver medal – second place	2011 Canelones	National team
- Last updated: December 2012

Hilary Palma (born January 5, 1997) is a Peruvian volleyball player who plays for the Peru national team. Palma was born in Trujillo, and was part of the team that won gold at the 2012 Youth South American Championship, the first gold medal for Peruvian volleyball in that category after 32 years and the first gold in any category in 19 years.

== Clubs ==
- (Peru) Sporting Cristal (2011–2017)
- (Peru) Circolo (2018-2020)
- (Peru) Universitario (2020-2021)
- (Peru) Atenea (2023-present)

== Awards ==
=== Individuals ===
- 2012 Liga Nacional Juvenil de Voleibol Femenino "Best Receiver"
- 2013 Liga Nacional Menor de Voleibol Femenino "Most Valuable Player"
- 2013 Liga Nacional Menor de Voleibol Femenino "Best Scorer"
- 2013 Liga Nacional Menor de Voleibol Femenino "Best Spiker"

=== National team ===
==== Junior team ====
- 2011 U16 South American Championship - Silver Medal
- 2012 Junior South American Championship - Silver Medal
- 2012 Youth South American Championship - Gold Medal
