= Luis León =

Luis León may refer to:

- Luis Fernando León (born 1993), Ecuadorian footballer
- Luis León Rodríguez (born 1966), Puerto Rican politician

Given names:

- Luis Leon Masson (1825–1882), French photography pioneer
- Luis León Sánchez (born 1983), Spanish road bicycle racer

== See also ==
- Luis de León (disambiguation)
