= Cristina Cuba =

Peruvian volleyball player

Personal information
- Nationality: Peruvian
- Born: 4 June 1996 (age 30); Lima
- Hometown: Lima

Volleyball information
- Position: Setter
- Current club: Club Regatas Lima
- Number: 4

National team
2011 -	Peru
Honours
Women's volleyball
Representing Peru
Junior S. American Championship
Silver medal – second place	2012 Lima	National team
Youth S. American Championship
Gold medal – first place	2012 Callao	National team
U16 S. American Championship
Silver medal – second place	2011 Canelones	National team
- Last updated: August 2013

Cristina Cuba (born 4 June 1996 in Lima, Peru) is a Peruvian volleyball player who plays as setter for the Peru national team. Cristina was part of the team that won gold at the 2012 Youth South American Championship, the first gold medal for Peruvian volleyball in that category after 32 years and the first gold in any category in 19 years.

== Clubs ==
- (Peru) Sporting Cristal (2011–2013)
- (Peru) Regatas Lima (2013–2019)
- (Peru) Deportivo Wanka (2019–2021)
- (Peru) Circolo Sportivo Italiano (2021–2024)
- (Peru) Regatas Lima (2024–present)

== Awards ==
=== Individuals ===
- 2012 Liga Nacional Juvenil de Voleibol Femenino "Best Server"

=== National team ===
==== Junior team ====
- 2011 U16 South American Championship - Silver Medal
- 2012 Junior South American Championship - Silver Medal
- 2012 Youth South American Championship - Gold Medal
