= 2025 Girls' U17 South American Volleyball Championship =

Tournament details
- Host country: Peru
- City: Lima
- Dates: 17–21 September 2025
- Teams: 7
- Venue: 1 (in 1 host city)

Final positions
- Champions: Venezuela (1st title)
- Runners-up: Brazil
- Third place: Peru
- Fourth place: Chile

Tournament awards
- MVP: (Venezuela) Yalesca Colina

Tournament statistics
- Matches played: 15

The 2025 Girls' U17 South American Volleyball Championship was the 2nd edition of the Girls' U17 South American Volleyball Championship, a biennial international girls' volleyball tournament organised by the Confederación Sudamericana de Voleibol (CSV) for the girls' under-17 national teams of South America. It was held in Lima, Peru from 17 to 21 September 2025.

Seven national teams took part in the tournament with players born between 1 January 2010 and 31 December 2011 being eligible to participate.

Same as previous edition, the tournament acted as the CSV qualifiers for the FIVB Volleyball Girls' U17 World Championship. The top three teams qualified for the 2026 FIVB Volleyball Girls' U17 World Championship in Chile as the CSV representatives, besides Chile who qualified automatically as hosts (if Chile were among the top three teams, the fourth-placed team would also qualify for the U-17 World Championship).

Venezuela won the title after beating Brazil 3–0 in the final. Peru defeated Chile 3–0 in the third place match to take the bronce medal. Champions Venezuela, runners-up Brazil and the third place Peru qualified for the 2026 FIVB Volleyball Girls' U17 World Championship.

== Host and venue ==
Villa El Salvador	Location of venue in Lima metropolitan area.
Polideportivo Lucha Fuentes	Location of venue in Lima metropolitan area.
Capacity: 5.034	Location of venue in Lima metropolitan area.

Peru was announced as the host country by the CSV on 4 April 2025, marking the second consecutive time it hosted the event after the inaugural edition in 2023.

The tournament was entirely played at the Polideportivo Lucha Fuentes in Villa El Salvador district.

== Teams ==
Seven of the twelve CSV member associations entered the tournament.

Team	App	Previous best performance
Argentina (holders)	2nd	Champions (2023)
Bolivia	2nd	Fifth place (2023)
Brazil	2nd	Runners-up (2023)
Chile	2nd	Sixth place (2023)
Colombia	2nd	Seventh place (2023)
Peru (hosts)	2nd	Third place (2023)
Venezuela	1st	None (Debut)

== Classification phase ==
All match times are in PET (UTC-5).

=== Pool A ===
Pos	Team	Pld	W	L	Pts	SW	SL	SR	SPW	SPL	SPR	Qualification
1	Chile	2	2	0	5	6	2	3.000	162	164	0.988	Semi-finals
2	Peru (H)	2	1	1	4	5	3	1.667	177	126	1.405	Semi-finals
3	Bolivia	2	0	2	0	0	6	0.000	104	153	0.680	5th–7th playoff

Source: FIVB
Rules for classification: 1) Matches won; 2) Points; 3) Sets Ratio; 4) Points ratio; 5) Head-to-head result.
(H) Host

Date	Time		Score		Set 1	Set 2	Set 3	Set 4	Set 5	Total	Report
17 Sep	17:30	Peru	3–0	Bolivia	25–18	25–14	25–10			75–42	P2 Report
18 Sep	17:30	Peru	2–3	Chile	25–7	19–25	20–25	25–12	13–15	102–84	P2 Report
19 Sep	15:00	Bolivia	0–3	Chile	24–26	13–25	25–27			62–78	P2 Report

=== Pool B ===
Pos	Team	Pld	W	L	Pts	SW	SL	SR	SPW	SPL	SPR	Qualification
1	Brazil	3	2	1	6	7	3	2.333	231	200	1.155	Semi-finals
2	Venezuela	3	2	1	6	7	4	1.750	249	239	1.042	Semi-finals
3	Argentina	3	2	1	6	6	4	1.500	227	212	1.071	5th–7th playoff
4	Colombia	3	0	3	0	0	9	0.000	173	229	0.755	5th–7th playoff

Source: FIVB
Rules for classification: 1) Matches won; 2) Points; 3) Sets Ratio; 4) Points ratio; 5) Head-to-head result.

Date	Time		Score		Set 1	Set 2	Set 3	Set 4	Set 5	Total	Report
17 Sep	15:00	Argentina	3–1	Venezuela	25–23	19–25	25–18	25–13		94–79	P2 Report
17 Sep	19:30	Brazil	3–0	Colombia	25–21	25–7	25–23			75–51	P2 Report
18 Sep	15:00	Argentina	3–0	Colombia	25–18	25–21	25–19			75–58	P2 Report
18 Sep	19:30	Brazil	1–3	Venezuela	13–25	25–16	23–25	20–25		81–91	P2 Report
19 Sep	17:30	Argentina	0–3	Brazil	17–25	18–25	23–25			58–75	P2 Report
19 Sep	19:30	Colombia	0–3	Venezuela	22–25	27–29	15–25			64–79	P2 Report

== Final phase ==
=== 5th–7th playoff ===
In the fifth to seventh place playoff, the third place team from Group A faced the fourth and third place teams from Group B, with the result between the latter two in the Classification phase being carried over to this round to be taken into account in the playoff standings.

Pos	Team	Pld	W	L	Pts	SW	SL	SR	SPW	SPL	SPR
5	Argentina	2	2	0	6	6	1	6.000	170	129	1.318
6	Colombia	2	1	1	3	3	4	0.750	150	156	0.962
7	Bolivia	2	0	2	0	2	6	0.333	152	187	0.813

Source: FIVB
Rules for classification: Tiebreakers

Date	Time		Score		Set 1	Set 2	Set 3	Set 4	Set 5	Total	Report
20 Sep	15:30	Colombia	3–1	Bolivia	25–16	17–25	25–19	25–21		92–81	P2 Report
21 Sep	13:00	Argentina	3–1	Bolivia	20–25	25–18	25–14	25–14		95–71	P2 Report

=== Final four ===
Semi-finals
20 September
Brazil	3
Peru	0
20 September
Chile	1
Venezuela	3

Final
21 September
Brazil	0
Venezuela	3
Third-place match
21 September
Peru	3
Chile	0

==== Semi-finals ====
Date	Time		Score		Set 1	Set 2	Set 3	Set 4	Set 5	Total	Report
20 Sep	18:00	Brazil	3–0	Peru	25–23	26–24	25–15			76–62	P2 Report
20 Sep	20:00	Chile	1–3	Venezuela	25–23	19–25	20–25	18–25		82–98	P2 Report

==== Third-place match ====
Date	Time		Score		Set 1	Set 2	Set 3	Set 4	Set 5	Total	Report
21 Sep	15:30	Peru	3–0	Chile	25–17	25–18	25–15			75–50	P2 Report

==== Final ====
Date	Time		Score		Set 1	Set 2	Set 3	Set 4	Set 5	Total	Report
21 Sep	17:30	Brazil	0–3	Venezuela	22–25	14–25	22–25			58–75	P2 Report

== Final standing ==
Rank	Team
1st place, gold medalist(s)	Venezuela
2nd place, silver medalist(s)	Brazil
3rd place, bronze medalist(s)	Peru
4	Chile
5	Argentina
6	Colombia
7	Bolivia

Qualified for 2026 FIVB Girls' U17 World Championship
Qualified for 2026 FIVB Girls' U17 World Championship as hosts
Qualified for 2026 FIVB Girls' U17 World Championship via FIVB World Ranking

2025 Girls' U17 South American champions

Venezuela
First title

Team Roster:

1 Lovera, 2 Rojas, 3 Carima, 4 Vivas, 5 Rodríguez, 6 Quintero, 7 Yalesca Colina (c), 8 Salas, 10 Victoria Sanoja, 11 Zerpa, 12 Andrea Páez, 14 Pacheco, 15 De Castro (L), 18 Arias (L).

Head coach: (Venezuela) Ihosvanny Chambers

== Individual awards ==
The following individual awards were presented at the end of the tournament.

- Most valuable player (MVP)

Yalesca Colina (VEN)

- Best middle blockers

Isadora De Almeida (BRA)
Victoria Sanoja (VEN)

- Best setter

Andrea Páez (VEN)

- Best opposite spiker

Victoria Martini (BRA)

- Best outside spikers

Yalesca Colina (VEN)
Sofía Olavarria (PER)

- Best libero

Valentina Maulen (CHI)
