= 2014 Girls' U16 South American Volleyball Championship =

Tournament details
- Host country: Peru
- Dates: November 6–9
- Teams: 5
- Venue: 1 (in 1 host city)

Final positions
- Champions: Peru (1st title)

Tournament awards
- MVP: Kiara Montes (PER)

The 2014 Girls' U16 South American Volleyball Championship was the 3rd edition of the tournament, organised by South America's governing volleyball body, the Confederación Sudamericana de Voleibol (CSV). Held in Chosica, Lima, Peru from November 6 to 9, 2014.

== Teams ==
Teams

Argentina
Bolivia
Chile
Peru
Uruguay

== Competition system ==
All matches in the preliminary round and the semifinals are played best out of three sets, the third place match and the Gold Medal match are played best out of 5 as normal senior tournaments.

The competition system for the second Girls' U16 South American Championship consist of two rounds, the first round was a Round-Robin system. Each team plays once against each of the 7 remaining teams with each team playing two matches in a day against different teams.

According to the final ranking in the first round, the best four teams will play in the semifinals (1º VS 4º and 2º VS 3º), the winners will play for the Gold Medal while the losers will play for the bronze medal.

== Matches ==
All times are Peru Standard Time (UTC-5)

=== Standings ===
Pos	Team	Pld	W	L	Pts	SW	SL	SR	SPW	SPL	SPR	Qualification
1	Argentina	4	4	0	8	8	0	MAX	200	116	1.724	Semifinals
2	Peru	4	3	1	7	6	3	2.000	199	153	1.301	Semifinals
3	Chile	4	2	2	6	4	6	0.667	175	215	0.814	Semifinals
4	Bolivia	4	1	3	5	4	6	0.667	183	212	0.863	Semifinals
5	Uruguay	4	0	4	4	1	8	0.125	148	209	0.708	

=== First round ===
==== Day 1 ====
Date	Time		Score		Set 1	Set 2	Set 3	Total
6 Nov	9:30	Argentina	2–0	Chile	25–12	25–13		50–25
6 Nov	10:30	Peru	2–0	Uruguay	25–12	25–11		50–23
6 Nov	17:00	Bolivia	0–2	Argentina	14–25	12–25		26–50
6 Nov	18:00	Peru	2–0	Chile	25–13	25–14		50–27

==== Day 2 ====
Date	Time		Score		Set 1	Set 2	Set 3	Total
7 Nov	9:30	Argentina	2–0	Uruguay	25–14	25–12		50–26
7 Nov	10:30	Bolivia	1–2	Chile	15–25	25–23	14–16	54–64
7 Nov	17:00	Uruguay	0–2	Bolivia	16–25	22–25		38–50
7 Nov	18:00	Peru	0–2	Argentina	22–25	17–25		39–50

==== Day 3 ====
Date	Time		Score		Set 1	Set 2	Set 3	Total
8 Nov	10:00	Peru	2–1	Bolivia	20–25	25–15	15–13	60–53
8 Nov	11:00	Chile	2–1	Uruguay	25–23	19–25	15–13	59–61

== Final round ==
=== Championship bracket ===
Semifinals
2014-11-08 - Chosica
Argentina	2
Bolivia	0
2014-11-08 - Chosica
Peru	2
Chile	0

1st place match
2014-11-09 - Chosica
Argentina	0
Peru	3
3rd place match
2014-11-09 - Chosica
Chile	2
Bolivia	3

=== Semifinals ===
Date	Time		Score		Set 1	Set 2	Set 3	Total
8 Nov	18:00	Peru	2–0	Chile	25–17	25–15		50–32
8 Nov	19:00	Argentina	2–0	Bolivia	25–17	25–18		50–35

=== Bronze Medal match ===
Date	Time		Score		Set 1	Set 2	Set 3	Set 4	Set 5	Total
9 Nov	15:00	Chile	2–3	Bolivia	25–21	25–11	9–25	22–25	11–15	92–97

=== Gold Medal match ===
Date	Time		Score		Set 1	Set 2	Set 3	Set 4	Set 5	Total
9 Nov	17:00	Peru	3–0	Argentina	25–21	30–28	25–21			80–70

== Final standing ==
Rank	Team
1st place, gold medalist(s)	Peru
2nd place, silver medalist(s)	Argentina
3rd place, bronze medalist(s)	Bolivia
4	Chile
5	Uruguay

2014 Girls' U16 South American Volleyball Championship

Peru
1st title

Team Roster:

Marcia Herrera, Coraima Hidalgo (L), Claudia Palza, Luz Chocano, Nayeli Vílchez, Alejandra Barrera, Flavia Montes, Shanaiya Ayme, Nicole Linares, Kiara Montes, Zandra Del Águila, Thaisa McLeod,

Head Coach: Enrique Briceño

== Individual awards ==
- Most valuable player
  - Kiara Montes (PER)
- Best middle blockers
  - Claudia Palza (PER)
  - Candela Salinas (ARG)
- Best Opposite
  - Melisa Corzo (ARG)
- Best setter
  - Pilar Cina (ARG)
- Best outside hitters
  - Ariagna Linares (PER)
  - Brenda Churin (ARG)
- Best libero
  - Coraima Hidalgo (PER)
