= Violeta Delgado =

Peruvian volleyball player

Personal information
- Born: 17 October 1996 (age 30) Trujillo, Peru
- Home town: Lima
- Height: 1.70 m (5 ft 7 in)
- Weight: 60 kg (132 lb)
- Spike: 269 cm (106 in)
- Block: 258 cm (102 in)

Volleyball information
- Position: Libero
- Current club: Deportivo Géminis
- Number: 6

National team
- Years: Team
- 2011 -: Peru
Honours
Women's volleyball
Representing Peru
Youth S. American Championship
Gold medal – first place	2012 Callao	National team
U16 S. American Championship
Silver medal – second place	2011 Canelones	National team
- Updated on August 2013

Violeta Delgado (born 17 October 1996 in Lima, Peru) is a Peruvian volleyball player who plays as libero for the Peru national team. Violeta was part of the team that won gold at the 2012 Youth South American Championship, the first gold medal for Peruvian volleyball in that category after 32 years and the first gold in any category in 19 years.

== Clubs ==
- (Peru) Latino Amisa (2011–2012)
- (Peru) Deportivo Géminis (2012–2015)
- (Peru) Circolo Sportivo Italiano (2017-2018)

== Awards ==
=== Individuals ===
- 2011 U16 South American Championship "Best Digger"
- 2012 Liga Nacional Juvenil de Voleibol Femenino "Best Libero"

=== National team ===
==== Junior team ====
- 2011 U16 South American Championship - Silver Medal
- 2012 Youth South American Championship - Gold Medal
