= 2015 Girls' U16 South American Volleyball Championship =

Tournament details
- Host country: Peru
- Dates: December 9–13
- Teams: 7
- Venue: 1 (in 1 host city)

Final positions
- Champions: Peru (2nd title)

Tournament awards
- MVP: Nayeli Vilchez (PER)

The 2015 Girls' U16 South American Volleyball Championship was the 4th edition of the tournament, organised by South America's governing volleyball body, the Confederación Sudamericana de Voleibol (CSV). Held in Tarapoto, Peru from December 9 to 13, 2015.

Players born on 1 January 2000 onwards were eligible to participate.

== Teams ==
Teams

Bolivia
Chile
Colombia
Paraguay
Peru
Uruguay
Venezuela

== Competition System ==
All matches in the preliminary round and the semifinals are played best out of three sets, the third place match and the Gold Medal match are played best out of 5 as normal senior tournaments.

The competition system for the second Girls' U16 South American Championship consisted of two rounds, the first round was a Round-Robin system. Each team plays once against each of the 6 remaining teams with each team playing two matches in a day against different teams.

According to the final ranking in the first round, the best four teams will play in the semifinals (1º VS 4º and 2º VS 3º) while the bottom three teams will play a second round-robin to determine the 5th to 7th classification, the winners of the semifinals will play for the Gold Medal while the losers will play for the bronze medal.

== Matches ==
All times are Peru Standard Time (UTC-5)

== Final standing ==
Rank	Team
1st place, gold medalist(s)	Peru
2nd place, silver medalist(s)	Bolivia
3rd place, bronze medalist(s)	Chile
4	Colombia
5	Venezuela
6	Uruguay
7	Paraguay

2015 Girls' U16 South American Volleyball Championship

Peru
2nd title

Team Roster:
Claudia Palza, Luz Chocano, Nayeli Vilchez (C), Alejandra Barrera, Flavia Montes, Shanaiya Ayme, Nicole Linares, Kiara Montes, Zandra Del Águila, Aixa Vigil, Valeria Takeda (L), Thaisa McLeod,
Head Coach: Enrique Briceño

== Individual awards ==
- Most valuable player
  - Nayeli Vilchez (PER)
- Best middle blockers
  - Flavia Montes (PER)
  - Yordalis Burguillos (VEN)
- Best Opposite
  - Zandra Del Aguila (PER)
- Best setter
  - Paula Salinas (CHI)
- Best outside hitters
  - Beatriz Novoa (CHI)
  - Fernanda Cañedo (BOL)
- Best libero
  - Valeria Takeda (PER)
