= 2013 Liga Nacional Menor de Voleibol Femenino =

The 2012 Liga Nacional Menores de Voleibol Femenino (Spanish for: 2012 Girls' Youth National Volleyball League) or 2012 LNMVF is the 1st edition of the Peruvian Volleyball League in the youth category (U17). The competition is open for all 12 teams who have the A1 category in the LNSV, for this season 11 out of the 12 teams signed up. Teams were made up of U17 players.

== Competing Teams ==
Teams were seeded according to how they finished in the 2012 Junior Edition.

Group A	Group B
Alianza Lima (ALI) (1st); Géminis (GEM) (4th); Universidad San Martín (USM) (5th); Wanka (DWK) (8th); Divino Maestro (CDM) (Draw); Universidad César Vallejo (USV) (Draw)	Sporting Cristal (SCR) (2nd); Túpac Amaru (TUP) (3rd); Circolo Sportivo Italiano (CSI) (6th); Regatas Lima (CRL) (7th); Latino Amisa (CLA) (Draw)

== Competition format ==
The competition is divided in two phases, the group round in which teams are divided into two groups and they will play once against the other teams in the same pool, after the first round is finished, the top three teams will move on to the next round. The final round is a single round-robyn with all six teams playing one against the other 5, including the teams that had already played each other in the group round, the top team ranking wise will be named champion.

== First round ==
=== Pool A ===
Pos	Team	Pld	W	L	Pts	SW	SL	SR	SPW	SPL	SPR
1	Géminis	5	5	0	15	15	2	7.500	413	300	1.377
2	Universidad San Martín	5	3	2	10	12	7	1.714	415	374	1.110
3	Divino Maestro	5	3	2	9	11	9	1.222	410	400	1.025
4	Alianza Lima	5	3	2	8	11	9	1.222	454	446	1.018
5	Wanka	5	1	4	3	4	12	0.333	318	388	0.820
6	Universidad César Vallejo	5	0	5	0	1	15	0.067	172	300	0.573

Date	Time		Score		Set 1	Set 2	Set 3	Set 4	Set 5	Total
17 Ago	14:00	Divino Maestro	3–1	Universidad César Vallejo	25–16	22–25	25–20	25–20		97–81
17 Ago	16:00	Wanka	0–3	Universidad San Martín	17–25	22–25	21–25			60–75
17 Ago	18:00	Géminis	3–1	Alianza Lima	20–25	25–19	26–24	25–22		96–90
23 Ago	14:00	Géminis	3–0	Divino Maestro	25–23	25–15	25–14			75–52
23 Ago	16:00	Universidad San Martín	3–0	Universidad César Vallejo	25–21	25–19	25–7			75–47
23 Ago	18:00	Alianza Lima	3–1	Wanka	25–17	31–29	24–26	25–21		105–93
29 Ago	19:00	Géminis	3–1	Universidad San Martín	25–13	25–20	17–25	25–17		92–75
30 Ago	19:00	Géminis	3–0	Wanka	25–14	25–11	25–14			75–39
31 Ago	19:00	Alianza Lima	3–0	Universidad César Vallejo	25–20	26–24	25–23			76–67
31 Ago	21:00	Divino Maestro	3–2	Universidad San Martín	6–25	23–25	25–11	25–22	15–9	94–92
01 Oct	14:00	Alianza Lima	3–2	Divino Maestro	18–25	19–25	25–15	25–14	15–13	102–92
01 Oct	18:00	Géminis	3–0	Universidad César Vallejo	25–16	25–8	25–20			75–44
02 Oct	18:00	Universidad César Vallejo	0–3	Wanka	19–25	15–25	24–26			58–76
04 Oct	14:00	Divino Maestro	3–0	Wanka	25–21	25–16	25–13			75–50
04 Oct	16:00	Alianza Lima	1–3	Universidad San Martín	20–25	15–25	25–23	21–25		81–98

=== Pool B ===
Pos	Team	Pld	W	L	Pts	SW	SL	SR	SPW	SPL	SPR
1	Túpac Amaru	4	4	0	12	12	0	MAX	305	232	1.315
2	Sporting Cristal	4	4	0	11	9	3	3.000	298	208	1.433
3	Circolo Sportivo Italiano	4	4	0	10	6	6	1.000	269	236	1.140
4	Latino Amisa	4	4	0	9	3	9	0.333	211	279	0.756
5	Regatas Lima	4	4	0	8	0	12	0.000	172	300	0.573

Date	Time		Score		Set 1	Set 2	Set 3	Set 4	Set 5	Total
16 Ago	18:00	Sporting Cristal	3–0	Circolo Sportivo Italiano	25–22	25–17	25–16			75–55
16 Ago	20:00	Latino Amisa	0–3	Túpac Amaru	15–25	14–25	19–25			48–75
21 Ago	18:00	Circolo Sportivo Italiano	3–0	Latino Amisa	25–13	25–18	25–18			75–49
21 Ago	20:00	Regatas Lima	0–3	Sporting Cristal	14–25	7–25	13–25			44–75
28 Ago	14:00	Túpac Amaru	3–0	Circolo Sportivo Italiano	25–23	25–18	25–23			75–64
30 Ago	17:00	Latino Amisa	3–0	Regatas Lima	25–15	25–20	25–19			75–54
31 Ago	15:00	Túpac Amaru	3–0	Regatas Lima	25–13	25–21	25–13			75–47
31 Ago	17:00	Latino Amisa	0–3	Sporting Cristal	18–25	8–25	13–25			39–75
01 Oct	16:00	Circolo Sportivo Italiano	3–0	Regatas Lima	25–13	25–10	25–14			75–37
01 Oct	20:00	Túpac Amaru	3–0	Sporting Cristal	27–25	28–26	25–22			80–73

== Final round ==
=== Final ranking ===
Pos	Team	Pld	W	L	Pts	SW	SL	SR	SPW	SPL	SPR
1	Sporting Cristal	5	5	0	13	15	5	3.000	467	371	1.259
2	Géminis	5	3	2	11	13	7	1.857	442	396	1.116
3	Túpac Amaru	5	2	3	8	11	8	1.375	423	360	1.175
4	Universidad San Martín	5	2	3	8	12	11	1.091	473	463	1.022
5	Divino Maestro	5	1	4	3	5	14	0.357	341	434	0.786
6	Circolo Sportivo Italiano	5	1	4	2	3	14	0.214	283	405	0.699

=== Matches ===
Date	Time		Score		Set 1	Set 2	Set 3	Set 4	Set 5	Total
07 Oct	16:00	Universidad San Martín	2–3	Sporting Cristal	16–25	25–21	19–25	25–21	11–15	96–107
07 Oct	18:00	Géminis	3–0	Divino Maestro	25–12	25–20	25–18			75–50
07 Oct	20:00	Túpac Amaru	3–0	Circolo Sportivo Italiano	25–12	25–13	25–12			75–37
08 Oct	15:00	Sporting Cristal	3–0	Circolo Sportivo Italiano	25–17	25–18	25–14			75–49
08 Oct	17:00	Géminis	2–3	Universidad San Martín	26–24	23–25	25–15	18–25	11–15	103–104
08 Oct	19:00	Túpac Amaru	3–0	Divino Maestro	25–6	25–15	25–17			75–38
11 Oct	18:00	Divino Maestro	2–3	Circolo Sportivo Italiano	22–25	24–26	25–22	25–18	9–15	105–106
11 Oct	20:00	Géminis	2–3	Sporting Cristal	25–23	15–25	26–24	23–25	8–15	97–112
13 Oct	18:00	Túpac Amaru	3–2	Universidad San Martín	19–25	20–25	25–20	25–14	15–11	104–95
13 Oct	20:00	Géminis	3–0	Circolo Sportivo Italiano	25–17	25–16	25–14			75–47
14 Oct	17:00	Túpac Amaru	1–3	Sporting Cristal	25–21	17–25	25–27	19–25		86–98
14 Oct	19:00	Universidad San Martín	2–3	Divino Maestro	25–21	25–18	19–25	20–25	14–16	103–105
15 Oct	14:00	Sporting Cristal	3–0	Divino Maestro	25–8	25–22	25–13			75–43
15 Oct	16:00	Universidad San Martín	3–0	Circolo Sportivo Italiano	25–14	25–14	25–16			75–44
15 Oct	18:00	Géminis	3–1	Túpac Amaru	25–23	25–19	17–25	25–16		92–83

== Final standing ==
Rank	Team
1st place, gold medalist(s)	Sporting Cristal
2nd place, silver medalist(s)	Géminis
3rd place, bronze medalist(s)	Túpac Amaru
4	Universidad San Martín
5	Divino Maestro
6	Circolo Sportivo Italiano
7	Alianza Lima
8	Wanka
9	Latino Amisa
10	Universidad César Vallejo
11	Regatas Lima

== Individual awards ==
- Most valuable player
  - Hilary Palma (Sporting Cristal)
- Best scorer
  - Hilary Palma (Sporting Cristal)
- Best spiker
  - Hilary Palma (Sporting Cristal)
- Best blocker
  - Nair Canessa (Géminis)
- Best server
  - Xiomara Mariche (Géminis)
- Best digger
  - Hannah Sobrado (Túpac Amaru)
- Best setter
  - Carol García (Túpac Amaru)
- Best receiver
  - Alyson Lora (Géminis)
- Best libero
  - Hannah Sobrado (Túpac Amaru)
