= 2013 Girls' U16 South American Volleyball Championship =

2013 volleyball tournament

Tournament details
- Host country: Colombia
- Dates: November 9–16
- Teams: 8
- Venues: 2 (in 1 host city)

Final positions
- Champions: Brazil (2nd title)

Tournament awards
- MVP: Ana Beatriz Franklin (BRA)

The 2013 Girls' U16 South American Volleyball Championship was the 2nd edition of the tournament, organised by South America's governing volleyball body, the Confederación Sudamericana de Voleibol (CSV). Held in Popayán, Cauca, Colombia from November 9 to 16, 2013.

== Teams ==
Teams

Argentina
Brazil
Bolivia
Chile
Colombia
Peru
Uruguay
Paraguay

== Competition System ==
All matches in the preliminary round and the semifinals were played best out of three sets, the third place match and the Gold Medal match were played best out of 5 as normal senior tournaments.

The competition system for the second Girls' U16 South American Championship consisted of two rounds, the first round was a Round-Robin system. Each team played once against each of the 7 remaining teams with each team playing two matches in a day against different teams.

According to the final ranking in the first round, the best four teams played in the semifinals (1º VS 4º and 2º VS 3º), the winners played for the Gold Medal while the losers played for the bronze medal.

== Matches ==
All times are Colombia Standard Time (UTC-5)

=== Standings ===
Pos	Team	Pld	W	L	Pts	SW	SL	SR	SPW	SPL	SPR	Qualification
1	Brazil	7	7	0	14	14	2	7.000	373	240	1.554	Semifinals
2	Peru	7	6	1	13	13	2	6.500	345	267	1.292	Semifinals
3	Argentina	7	5	2	12	11	4	2.750	352	240	1.467	Semifinals
4	Chile	7	4	3	11	8	6	1.333	317	289	1.097	Semifinals
5	Colombia	7	3	4	10	6	8	0.750	315	296	1.064	
6	Uruguay	7	2	5	9	4	10	0.400	234	338	0.692	
7	Bolivia	7	1	6	8	2	13	0.154	218	351	0.621	
8	Paraguay	7	0	7	7	1	14	0.071	220	351	0.627	

=== First round ===
The first round matches were divided in two parts, the first part saw the top three teams plus the host (Colombia, Brazil, Peru and Argentina) play the other four teams (Chile, Paraguay, Uruguay and Bolivia), this part was played for two days, the second part had the remaining matches between the groups, this round was played for a day and a half.

==== Day 1 ====
Date	Time		Score		Set 1	Set 2	Set 3	Total
11 Nov	8:00	Brazil	2–0	Uruguay	25–8	25–12		50–20
11 Nov	9:15	Peru	2–0	Paraguay	25–17	25–13		50–30
11 Nov	10:30	Argentina	2–0	Chile	25–18	25–14		50–32
11 Nov	11:45	Colombia	2–0	Bolivia	25–16	25–16		50–32
11 Nov	14:00	Peru	2–0	Chile	25–23	25–17		50–40
11 Nov	15:15	Argentina	2–0	Paraguay	25–9	25–13		50–22
11 Nov	16:30	Brazil	2–0	Bolivia	25–8	25–6		50–14
11 Nov	17:45	Colombia	2–0	Uruguay	25–14	25–17		50–31

==== Day 2 ====
Date	Time		Score		Set 1	Set 2	Set 3	Total
12 Nov	8:00	Brazil	2–0	Chile	25–21	25–21		50–42
12 Nov	9:15	Peru	2–0	Bolivia	25–10	25–10		50–20
12 Nov	10:30	Argentina	2–0	Uruguay	25–9	25–9		50–18
12 Nov	11:45	Colombia	2–0	Paraguay	25–16	25–14		50–30
12 Nov	14:00	Peru	2–0	Uruguay	25–16	25–14		50–30
12 Nov	15:15	Brazil	2–0	Paraguay	25–8	25–14		50–22
12 Nov	16:30	Argentina	2–0	Bolivia	25–10	25–9		50–19
12 Nov	17:45	Colombia	0–2	Chile	21–25	26–28		47–53

==== Day 3 ====
Date	Time		Score		Set 1	Set 2	Set 3	Total
13 Nov	8:00	Brazil	2–1	Peru	17–25	25–16	15–4	57–45
13 Nov	9:15	Chile	2–0	Bolivia	25–23	25–14		50–37
13 Nov	10:30	Paraguay	0–2	Uruguay	21–25	22–25		43–50
13 Nov	11:45	Colombia	0–2	Argentina	18–25	15–25		33–50
13 Nov	14:00	Chile	2–0	Uruguay	25–17	25–16		50–33
13 Nov	15:15	Paraguay	1–2	Bolivia	16–25	25–11	10–15	51–51
13 Nov	16:30	Brazil	2–1	Argentina	25–15	23–25	18–16	66–56
13 Nov	17:45	Colombia	0–2	Peru	21–25	23–25		44–50

==== Day 4 ====
Date	Time		Score		Set 1	Set 2	Set 3	Total
14 Nov	8:00	Peru	2–0	Argentina	25–23	25–23		50–46
14 Nov	9:15	Chile	2–0	Paraguay	25–8	25–14		50–22
14 Nov	10:30	Bolivia	0–2	Uruguay	20–25	25–27		45–52
14 Nov	11:45	Colombia	0–2	Brazil	23–25	18–25		41–50

== Final round ==
=== 5th/8th classification ===
Pos	Team	Pld	W	L	Pts	SW	SL	SR	SPW	SPL	SPR
5	Colombia	3	3	0	6	6	0	MAX	150	102	1.471
6	Bolivia	3	2	1	5	4	2	2.000	142	129	1.101
7	Paraguay	3	1	2	4	2	4	0.500	111	133	0.835
8	Uruguay	3	0	3	3	0	6	0.000	111	150	0.740

Date	Time		Score		Set 1	Set 2	Set 3	Total
14 Nov	16:30	Uruguay	0–2	Bolivia	23–25	21–25		44–50
14 Nov	17:45	Colombia	2–0	Paraguay	25–19	25–7		50–26
15 Nov	8:30	Paraguay	2–0	Uruguay	25–20	25–13		50–33
15 Nov	9:45	Colombia	2–0	Bolivia	25–22	25–20		50–42
15 Nov	15:00	Bolivia	2–0	Paraguay	25–15	25–20		50–35
15 Nov	16:15	Colombia	2–0	Uruguay	25–13	25–21		50–34

=== Championship bracket ===
5th/8th bracket
2011-11-15 - Popayán
Brazil	2
Chile	0
2011-11-15 - Popayán
Peru	1
Argentina	2

5th place match
2011-11-15 - Popayán
Brazil	3
Argentina	2
7th place match
2011-11-15 - Popayán
Chile	0
Peru	3

=== Semifinals ===
Date	Time		Score		Set 1	Set 2	Set 3	Total
15 Nov	10:30	Brazil	2–0	Chile	25–10	25–13		50–23
15 Nov	11:45	Peru	1–2	Argentina	25–15	19–25	6–15	50–60

=== Bronze Medal match ===
Date	Time		Score		Set 1	Set 2	Set 3	Set 4	Set 5	Total
15 Nov	17:30	Chile	0–3	Peru	17–25	21–25	21–25			59–75

=== Gold Medal match ===
Date	Time		Score		Set 1	Set 2	Set 3	Set 4	Set 5	Total
15 Nov	19:00	Brazil	3–2	Argentina	16–25	25–18	25–22	21–25	15–9	50–60

== Final standing ==
Rank	Team
1st place, gold medalist(s)	Brazil
2nd place, silver medalist(s)	Argentina
3rd place, bronze medalist(s)	Peru
4	Chile
5	Colombia
6	Bolivia
7	Paraguay
8	Uruguay

2013 Girls' U16 South American Volleyball champions

Brazil
2nd title

== Individual awards ==
- Most valuable player
  - Ana Beatriz Franklin (BRA)
- Best Middle Blockers
  - Mariane Casas (BRA)
  - Agustina Beltramino (ARG)
- Best Opposite
  - Ana Beatriz Franklin (BRA)
- Best setter
  - Azul Benitez (ARG)
- Best Outside Hitters
  - Cassia Rauber (BRA)
  - Fiamma Biain (ARG)
- Best libero
  - Valentina Carrasco (PER)
