= Rosa Valiente =

Peruvian volleyball player

Personal information
- Nationality: Peruvian
- Born: June 26, 1996 (age 30); Lima
- Hometown: Lima
- Height: 1.78 m (5 ft 10 in)
- Spike: 298 cm (117 in)
- Block: 300 cm (120 in)

Volleyball information
- Position: Middle Blocker
- Current club: Tupac Amaru
- Number: 10

National team
| 2011 - | Peru |
Honours
Women's volleyball
Representing Peru
Junior S. American Championship
| Silver medal – second place | 2012 Lima | National team |
Youth S. American Championship
| Gold medal – first place | 2012 Callao | National team |
U16 S. American Championship
| Silver medal – second place | 2011 Canelones | National team |
- Last updated: November 2012

Rosa Valiente (born June 26, 1996 in Lima, Peru) is a Peruvian volleyball player who plays for the Peru national team. Rosa was part of the team that won gold at the 2012 Youth South American Championship, the first gold medal for Peruvian volleyball in that category after 32 years and the first gold in any category in 19 years.

== Clubs ==
- (Peru) Tupac Amaru (2010–present)

== Awards ==
=== Individuals ===
- 2011 Liga Nacional Juvenil de Voleibol "Best Blocker"
- 2011 U16 South American Championship "Best Server"
- 2012 Youth South American Championship "Best Blocker"

=== National team ===
==== Junior team ====
- 2011 U16 South American Championship - Silver Medal
- 2012 Junior South American Championship - Silver Medal
- 2012 Youth South American Championship - Gold Medal
