= Luis Leon Masson =

French photographer (1825-1882)

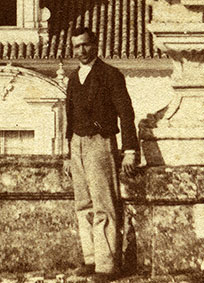
- Born: Louis François Léon Masson; July 31, 1825; Tours, France
- Died: April 4, 1882 (aged 56); Paris
- Known for: Photography
- Notable work: Granada, Alhambra, Courtyard with Reflecting Pool (1863); Burgos Cathedral (1866)

Luis Leon Masson (born as Louis François Leon Masson y Besneé) (1825-1882) was the son of Nicolás François Masson, by profession a transporter and Louise Sophie Besneé. He is one of the most prominent photographers to work in Spain in the first decades of photography. His activity as a photographer highlights his topographical work on the architectural and landscape heritage of Andalusian cities, mainly Seville, as well as important contributions from other Castilian cities, as well as his reproductions of Murillo's pictorial work.

== Career ==
Luis Masson is the Spanishized name that he adopts when he settled in Seville in May 1858, accompanied by his wife Lorenza Simonin Berard, a collaborator in his photographic works. During the next eight years he made a large number of photographs of the city, focusing especially on its great monuments, such as the Alcázar, the cathedral or the Casa de Pilatos, as well as the Palace of San Telmo in attention to the Duke of Montpensier with whom he immediately establishes a remarkable client relationship. The photographs of Granada, Córdoba, Málaga or Cádiz, demonstrate the repeated excursions to these and other cities to complete their collection, both in album format and in stereoscopies. In 1866 he moved to Madrid where he stayed for a brief period, also moving to Toledo, Ávila, Valladolid, Salamanca or Burgos, cities from which he has left an interesting set of images. He returned to Seville at the end of the 1870s to disappear permanently in 1881.

== Honor and awards ==
- The London World's Fair (1862) (honorable mention)
- The Society of French Photography (1863)

== Works ==
More than 500 photographs of this author have been identified, all of them taken in Spain. His work is mainly deposited in the Bibliothèque nationale de France, in the Victoria and Albert Museum, in the British Library, in the Société française de photographie or in the Museum of the University of Navarra, as well as in private collections such as that belonging to the heirs of the Duke of Montpensier.

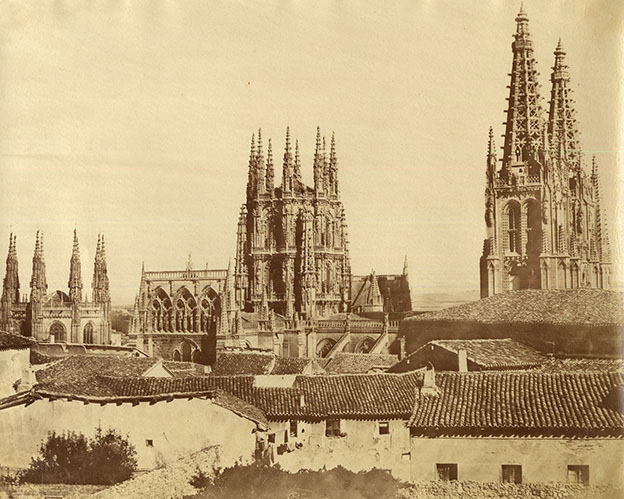
Burgos (Spain) Cathedral from the north

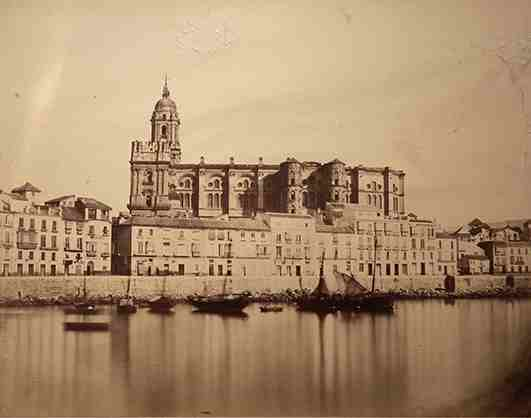
Malaga, the city and the cathedral from the port

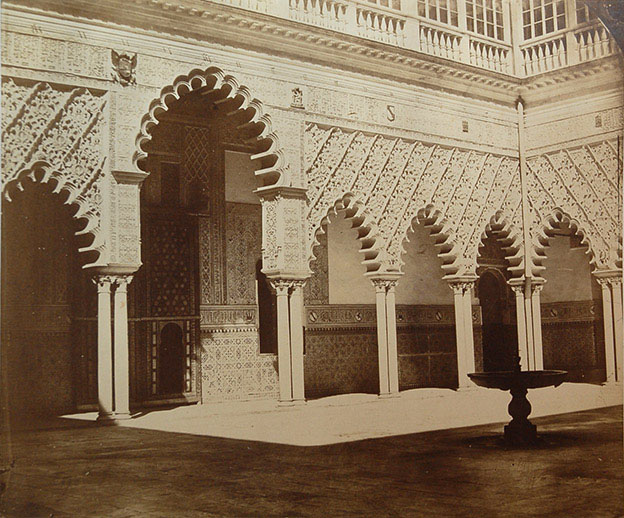
Seville, the Alcázar. Courtyard of the maidens
