= Bárbara Briceño =

Peruvian volleyball player (born 1996)

Personal information
- Full name: Bárbara Briceño Rabanal
- Born: 14 May 1996 (age 30); Peru
- Hometown: Peru
- Height: 177 cm (70 in)
- Weight: 76 kg (168 lb)
- Spike: 285 cm (112 in)
- Block: 278 cm (109 in)
- Education: Saint Peter's University

Volleyball information
- Position: Outside, Defense Specialist, libero, and right side.
- Number: 9

Career
Years	Teams
2014	Club Cesar Vallejo

National team
2014	Peru

Bárbara Briceño Rabanal (Note: In this Spanish name, the first or paternal surname is Briceño and the second or maternal family name is Rabanal.) (born 14 May 1996) is a Peruvian female volleyball player. She is part of the Peru women's national volleyball team.

She participated in the 2014 FIVB Volleyball World Grand Prix. On club level she played for Club Cesar Vallejo in 2014.
