= 2012 Liga Nacional Juvenil de Voleibol Femenino =

The 2012 Liga Nacional Juvenil de Voleibol Femenino (Spanish for: 2012 Women's Junior National Volleyball League) or 2012 LNJVF is the 2nd edition of the Peruvian Volleyball League. The competition is open for all 12 teams who have the A1 category in the LNSV, for this season 8 out of the 12 teams signed up. Teams were made up of U19 players.

== Competing Teams ==
Teams were seeded according to how they finished in the previous edition.

Group A	Group B
Géminis (GEM) (1st); Wanka (DWK) (4th); Sporting Cristal (SCR) (5th); Regatas Lima (CRL) (8th)	Alianza Lima (ALI) (2nd); Túpac Amaru (TUP) (3rd); Universidad San Martín (USM) (6th); Circolo Sportivo Italiano (CSI) (7th)

== Competition format ==
The competition is divided in two phases, the group round in which all teams will play once against the other three teams in the same pool, after the first round is finished, the top three teams will move on to the next round, meaning one team in each pool will be eliminated. The final round is a single round-robyn with all six teams playing one against the other 5, including the teams that had already played each other in the group round, the top team ranking wise will be named champion.

== First round ==
=== Pool A ===
Pos	Team	Pld	W	L	Pts	SW	SL	SR	SPW	SPL	SPR
1	Géminis	3	3	0	8	9	2	4.500	253	211	1.199
2	Sporting Cristal	3	2	1	7	8	3	2.667	248	195	1.272
3	Wanka	3	1	2	3	3	6	0.500	190	219	0.868
4	Regatas Lima	3	0	3	0	0	9	0.000	161	227	0.709

Date	Time		Score		Set 1	Set 2	Set 3	Set 4	Set 5	Total
15 Sep	19:00	Géminis	3–0	Regatas Lima	25–17	25–16	25–21			75–54
15 Sep	20:30	Wanka	0–3	Sporting Cristal	20–25	18–25	16–25			54–75
22 Sep	19:00	Wanka	3–0	Regatas Lima	25–23	27–25	25–21			77–69
22 Sep	20:30	Géminis	3–2	Sporting Cristal	22–25	25–20	25–20	16–25	15–8	103–98
29 Sep	19:00	Sporting Cristal	3–0	Regatas Lima	25–8	25–14	25–16			75–38
29 Sep	20:30	Géminis	3–0	Wanka	25–15	25–22	25–22			75–59

=== Pool B ===
Pos	Team	Pld	W	L	Pts	SW	SL	SR	SPW	SPL	SPR
1	Tupac Amaru	3	3	0	9	9	1	9.000	246	188	1.309
2	Alianza Lima	3	2	1	6	7	4	1.750	251	211	1.190
3	Universidad San Martín	3	1	2	2	3	8	0.375	209	243	0.860
4	Circolo Sportivo Italiano	3	0	3	1	3	9	0.333	213	277	0.769

Date	Time		Score		Set 1	Set 2	Set 3	Set 4	Set 5	Total
10 Sep	19:00	Túpac Amaru	3–0	Circolo Sportivo Italiano	25–15	25–19	25–16			75–50
10 Sep	20:30	Alianza Lima	3–0	Universidad San Martín	25–16	25–12	25–17			75–45
17 Sep	19:00	Alianza Lima	3–1	Circolo Sportivo Italiano	23–25	25–15	25–10	25–20		98–70
17 Sep	20:30	Túpac Amaru	3–0	Universidad San Martín	25–23	25–15	25–22			75–60
24 Sep	19:00	Universidad San Martín	3–2	Circolo Sportivo Italiano	25–16	25–21	19–25	20–25	15–6	104–93
24 Sep	20:30	Túpac Amaru	3–1	Alianza Lima	26–24	20–25	25–15	25–14		96–78

== Final round ==
=== Final ranking ===
Pos	Team	Pld	W	L	Pts	SW	SL	SR	SPW	SPL	SPR
1	Alianza Lima	5	5	0	14	15	5	3.000	466	397	1.174
2	Sporting Cristal	5	3	2	9	11	6	1.833	383	351	1.091
3	Géminis	5	3	2	8	11	9	1.222	447	410	1.090
4	Túpac Amaru	5	2	3	8	10	10	1.000	443	405	1.094
5	Universidad San Martín	5	2	3	5	6	12	0.500	342	432	0.792
6	Wanka	5	0	5	1	4	15	0.267	370	456	0.811

=== Matches ===
Date	Time		Score		Set 1	Set 2	Set 3	Set 4	Set 5	Total
12 Sep	19:00	Géminis	3–0	Universidad San Martín	25–22	25–13	25–13			75–48
12 Sep	20:30	Sporting Cristal	1–3	Alianza Lima	20–25	25–21	10–25	22–25		77–96
14 Sep	19:00	Géminis	3–2	Wanka	20–25	25–18	25–23	23–25	15–11	108–102
14 Sep	20:30	Túpac Amaru	0–3	Sporting Cristal	24–26	24–26	18–25			66–77
15 Sep	14:00	Túpac Amaru	3–0	Wanka	25–14	25–16	25–18			75–48
15 Sep	16:00	Alianza Lima	3–0	Universidad San Martín	25–13	25–20	25–18			75–51
16 Sep	15:00	Túpac Amaru	2–3	Universidad San Martín	24–26	25–12	20–25	25–9	14–16	108–88
16 Sep	17:00	Sporting Cristal	3–0	Wanka	25–17	25–11	25–17			75–45
16 Sep	19:00	Géminis	1–3	Alianza Lima	22–25	25–14	24–26	19–25		90–90
19 Sep	19:00	Universidad San Martín	3–1	Wanka	20–25	30–28	25–21	27–25		102–99
19 Sep	20:30	Géminis	1–3	Túpac Amaru	25–16	20–25	23–25	15–25		83–91
20 Sep	19:00	Sporting Cristal	3–0	Universidad San Martín	25–18	25–17	25–18			75–53
20 Sep	20:30	Alianza Lima	3–1	Wanka	25–14	21–25	25–22	25–15		96–76
21 Sep	19:00	Géminis	3–1	Sporting Cristal	25–17	16–25	25–16	25–21		91–79
21 Sep	20:30	Alianza Lima	3–2	Túpac Amaru	22–25	25–23	25–19	22–25	15–11	109–103

== Final standing ==
Rank	Team
1st place, gold medalist(s)	Alianza Lima
2nd place, silver medalist(s)	Sporting Cristal
3rd place, bronze medalist(s)	Géminis
4	Tupac Amaru
5	Universidad San Martín
6	Wanka
7	Circolo Sportivo Italiano
8	Regatas Lima

== Individual awards ==
- Most valuable player
  - Danae Carranza (Alianza Lima)
- Best scorer
  - Ángela Leyva (Universidad San Martín)
- Best spiker
  - Ángela Leyva (Universidad San Martín)
- Best blocker
  - Nair Canessa (Géminis)
- Best server
  - Cristina Cuba (Sporting Cristal)
- Best digger
  - Astrid Flores (Túpac Amaru)
- Best setter
  - Shiamara Almeida (Sporting Cristal)
- Best receiver
  - Hilary Palma (Sporting Cristal)
- Best libero
  - Violeta Delgado (Géminis)
