= Luis de León (disambiguation) =

Fray Luis de León (1527–1591) was a Spanish lyric poet, Augustinian friar, theologian and academic.

Other people with similar names include:

- Luis Ponce de León (governor of New Spain) (c. 1461–1526), Spanish colonial functionary
- Luis de Lión ("José Luis de León Díaz", 1939–1984), disappeared Guatemalan writer
- Luis DeLeón (born 1958), Puerto Rican baseball pitcher
- Luis de León (footballer) (born 1995), Guatemalan footballer
- Luis De León (born 2003), Dominican baseball pitcher

== See also ==
- Luis León (disambiguation)
