= 2023 Girls' U17 South American Volleyball Championship =

Tournament details
- Host country: Peru
- City: Callao
- Dates: 27 September - 1 October 2023
- Teams: 7
- Venue: 1 (in 1 host city)

Final positions
- Champions: Argentina (1st title)
- Runners-up: Brazil
- Third place: Peru
- Fourth place: Ecuador

Tournament awards
- MVP: (Argentina) Justina Fortes
- Best Setter: (Argentina) Emma Wilmer
- Best OH: (Argentina) Eugenia Martínez (Brazil) Laura Maccarone
- Best MB: (Peru) Valeria Fuentes (Brazil) Kamilla Galvão
- Best OPP: (Argentina) Victoria Matich
- Best Libero: (Ecuador) Romina Alcívar

Tournament statistics
- Matches played: 14

The 2023 Girls' U17 South American Volleyball Championship (officially known as the Sudamericano Femenino U17 Lima 2023, Copa JetSMART for sponsorship purposes) was the 1st edition of the Girls' U17 South American Volleyball Championship, a biennial international girls' volleyball tournament organised by the Confederación Sudamericana de Voleibol (CSV) for the girls' under-17 national teams of South America. It was held in Callao, Peru from 27 September to 1 October 2023.

Seven national teams took part in the tournament. Players born between 1 January 2008 and 31 December 2009 were eligible to participate.

The tournament acted as the CSV qualifiers for the FIVB Volleyball Girls' U17 World Championship. The top three teams qualified for the 2024 FIVB Volleyball Girls' U17 World Championship as the CSV representatives.

Argentina won the title after beating Brazil 3–2 in the final. Peru defeated Ecuador 3–1 in the third place match to take the bronce medal. Champions Argentina, runners-up Brazil and the third place Peru qualified for the 2024 FIVB Volleyball Girls' U17 World Championship.

== Host nation and venue ==
Bellavista	Location of venue in Callao region.
Coliseo Miguel Grau	Location of venue in Callao region.
Capacity: 2,400	Location of venue in Callao region.

On 11 March 2023, during a visit to Peru, the CSV president Marco Tullio Teixeira announced that the country would host the first edition of the Girls' U17 South American Championship, which was later confirmed by the Peruvian Volleyball Federation.

The tournament was entirely played at the Coliseo Miguel Grau, an indoor arena that is part of the Villa Deportiva del Callao located in the Bellavista District, Callao region.

== Classification phase ==
All match times are in PET (UTC-5).

=== Pool A ===
Pos	Team	Pld	W	L	Pts	SW	SL	SR	SPW	SPL	SPR	Qualification
1	Argentina	2	2	0	5	6	2	3.000	178	156	1.141	Semi-finals
2	Peru (H)	2	1	1	4	5	3	1.667	186	137	1.358	Semi-finals
3	Bolivia	3	0	3	0	0	6	0.000	79	150	0.527	Fifth-place match

Rules for classification: 1) Matches won; 2) Points; 3) Sets Ratio; 4) Points ratio; 5) Head-to-head result.
(H) Host

Date	Time		Score		Set 1	Set 2	Set 3	Set 4	Set 5	Total	Report
27 Sep	20:00	Peru	3–0	Bolivia	25–14	25–9	25–11			75–34	P2 Report
28 Sep	20:00	Peru	2–3	Argentina	25–20	23–25	22–25	25–15	16–18	111–103	P2 Report
29 Sep	20:00	Bolivia	0–3	Argentina	11–25	22–25	12–25			45–75	P2 Report

=== Pool B ===
Pos	Team	Pld	W	L	Pts	SW	SL	SR	SPW	SPL	SPR	Qualification
1	Brazil	3	3	0	9	9	1	9.000	178	156	1.141	Semi-finals
2	Ecuador	3	2	1	5	6	5	1.200	215	225	0.956	Semi-finals
3	Chile	3	1	2	3	4	7	0.571	215	248	0.867	Fifth-place match
4	Colombia	3	0	3	1	3	9	0.333	195	275	0.709	

Rules for classification: 1) Matches won; 2) Points; 3) Sets Ratio; 4) Points ratio; 5) Head-to-head result.

Date	Time		Score		Set 1	Set 2	Set 3	Set 4	Set 5	Total	Report
27 Sep	16:00	Ecuador	3–2	Colombia	25–15	19–25	23–25	25–19	15–9	107–93	P2 Report
27 Sep	18:00	Chile	1–3	Brazil	28–26	7–25	10–25	20–25		65–101	P2 Report
28 Sep	16:00	Ecuador	0–3	Brazil	14–25	10–25	9–25			33–75	P2 Report
28 Sep	18:00	Chile	3–1	Colombia	25–17	18–25	25–22	25–8		93–72	P2 Report
29 Sep	16:00	Colombia	0–3	Brazil	14–25	10–25	6–25			30–75	P2 Report
29 Sep	18:00	Chile	0–3	Ecuador	20–25	16–25	21–25			57–75	P2 Report

== Final phase ==
=== Bracket ===
Semi-finals
30 September
Argentina	3
Ecuador	0
30 September
Brazil	3
Peru	0

Final
1 October
Argentina	3
Brazil	2

Fifth-place match
30 September
Bolivia	3
Chile	1

Third-place match
1 October
Ecuador	1
Peru	3

=== Semi-finals ===
Date	Time		Score		Set 1	Set 2	Set 3	Set 4	Set 5	Total	Report
30 Sep	18:00	Argentina	3–0	Ecuador	25–17	25–22	25–10			75–49	P2 Report
30 Sep	20:00	Brazil	3–0	Peru	25–12	25–19	25–16			75–47	P2 Report

=== Fifth-place match ===
Date	Time		Score		Set 1	Set 2	Set 3	Set 4	Set 5	Total	Report
30 Sep	16:00	Bolivia	3–1	Chile	25–20	25–20	13–25	25–18		88–83	P2 Report

=== Third-place match ===
Date	Time		Score		Set 1	Set 2	Set 3	Set 4	Set 5	Total	Report
1 Oct	18:00	Ecuador	1–3	Peru	20–25	25–22	14–25	16–25		75–97	P2 Report

=== Final ===
Date	Time		Score		Set 1	Set 2	Set 3	Set 4	Set 5	Total	Report
1 Oct	20:00	Argentina	3–2	Brazil	25–21	18–25	25–19	18–25	19–17	105–107	P2 Report

== Final standing ==
Rank	Team
1st place, gold medalist(s)	Argentina
2nd place, silver medalist(s)	Brazil
3rd place, bronze medalist(s)	Peru
4	Ecuador
5	Bolivia
6	Chile
7	Colombia

Qualified for 2024 FIVB Girls' U17 World Championship

2023 Girls' U17 South American champions

Argentina
First title

Team Roster:

1 Emma Williner, 2 Renata Herrero, 3 Abril Faiazzo, 4 Agustina Torrigiani, 5 Julieta Medina, 6 Emma Oldani, 7 Helena Cugno, 8 Justina Fortes, 9 Bianca Kisur, 10 María Eugenia Martínez, 11 Victoria Matich (c), 12 Guadalupe Salto (L)

Head coach: (Argentina) Gabriela Puente

== Individual awards ==
The following individual awards were presented at the end of the tournament.

- Most valuable player

Justina Fortes (ARG)

- Best middle blockers

Valeria Fuentes (PER)
Kamilla Galvão (BRA)

- Best setter

Emma Wilmer (ARG)

- Best opposite spiker

Victoria Matich (ARG)

- Best outside spikers

Eugenia Martínez (ARG)
Laura Maccarone (BRA)

- Best libero

Romina Alcívar (ECU)
