= 2011 Girls' U16 South American Volleyball Championship =

Tournament details
- Host country: Uruguay
- Dates: November 21–26
- Teams: 8
- Venue: 1 (in 1 host city)

Final positions
- Champions: Brazil (1st title)

Tournament awards
- MVP: Drussyla Costa (BRA)

The 2011 Girls' U16 South American Volleyball Championship was the 1st edition of the tournament, organised by South America's governing volleyball body, the Confederación Sudamericana de Voleibol (CSV). It was held in Canelones, Uruguay from November 21 to 26, 2011.

== Teams ==
Teams

Argentina
Brazil
Chile
Colombia
Paraguay
Peru
Uruguay
Venezuela

== Competition System ==
All matches in the preliminary round and the semifinals are played best out of three sets, the third place match and the Gold Medal match are played best out of 5 as normal senior tournaments.

The competition system for the First Girls' U16 South American Championship consist of two rounds, the first round was a Round-Robin system. Each team plays once against each of the 7 remaining teams with each team playing two matches in a day against different teams.

According to the final ranking in the first round, the best four teams will play in the semifinals (1º VS 4º and 2º VS 3º), the winners will play for the Gold Medal while the losers will play for the bronze medal.

== Matches ==
All times are Uruguay Standard Time (UTC-2)

=== Standings ===
Pos	Team	Pld	W	L	Pts	SW	SL	SR	SPW	SPL	SPR	Qualification
1	Peru	7	7	0	14	14	1	14.000	359	237	1.515	Semifinals
2	Brazil	7	6	1	13	12	3	4.000	361	269	1.342	Semifinals
3	Argentina	7	5	2	12	11	4	2.750	347	247	1.405	Semifinals
4	Chile	7	4	3	11	9	8	1.125	342	331	1.033	Semifinals
5	Colombia	7	3	4	10	7	8	0.875	331	301	1.100	
6	Venezuela	7	2	5	9	5	10	0.500	268	331	0.810	
7	Paraguay	7	1	6	8	2	12	0.167	215	334	0.644	
8	Uruguay	7	0	7	7	0	14	0.000	186	350	0.531	

=== First round ===
==== Day 1 ====
Date	Time		Score		Set 1	Set 2	Set 3	Total
22 Nov	8:30	Uruguay	0–2	Peru	14–25	8–25		22–50
22 Nov	10:00	Brazil	2–0	Colombia	25–17	25–23		50–40
22 Nov	11:30	Paraguay	0–2	Chile	14–25	16–25		30–50
22 Nov	13:00	Argentina	1–2	Peru	25–18	22–25	7–15	54–58
22 Nov	14:30	Brazil	2–0	Venezuela	25–18	25–14		50–32
22 Nov	16:00	Chile	2–1	Colombia	14–25	25–23	15–13	54–61
22 Nov	18:00	Paraguay	2–0	Uruguay	25–22	25–22		50–44
22 Nov	19:30	Argentina	2–0	Venezuela	25–8	25–13		50–21

==== Day 2 ====
Date	Time		Score		Set 1	Set 2	Set 3	Total
23 Nov	9:00	Colombia	2–0	Uruguay	25–14	25–16		50–30
23 Nov	10:30	Argentina	0–2	Brazil	20–25	23–25		43–50
23 Nov	12:00	Chile	2–1	Venezuela	25–22	16–25	15–12	56–59
23 Nov	13:30	Paraguay	0–2	Peru	16–25	8–25		24–50
23 Nov	15:00	Chile	1–2	Brazil	26–24	23–25	12–15	61–64
23 Nov	16:30	Argentina	2–0	Paraguay	25–17	25–8		50–25
23 Nov	18:00	Colombia	0–2	Peru	15–25	10–25		25–50
23 Nov	19:30	Uruguay	0–2	Venezuela	16–25	17–25		33–50

==== Day 3 ====
Date	Time		Score		Set 1	Set 2	Set 3	Total
24 Nov	9:00	Argentina	2–0	Chile	25–15	25–15		50–30
24 Nov	10:30	Uruguay	0–2	Brazil	13–25	7–25		20–50
24 Nov	12:00	Colombia	2–0	Paraguay	25–15	25–8		50–23
24 Nov	13:30	Venezuela	0–2	Peru	9–25	15–25		24–50
24 Nov	15:00	Argentina	2–0	Colombia	25–23	25–22		50–45
24 Nov	16:30	Uruguay	0–2	Chile	9–25	8–25		17–50
24 Nov	18:00	Venezuela	2–0	Paraguay	25–22	25–20		50–42
24 Nov	19:30	Peru	2–0	Brazil	26–24	25–23		51–47

==== Day 4 ====
Date	Time		Score		Set 1	Set 2	Set 3	Total
25 Nov	9:00	Venezuela	0–2	Colombia	12–25	22–25		34–50
25 Nov	10:30	Argentina	2–0	Uruguay	25–14	25–6		50–20
25 Nov	12:00	Brazil	2–0	Paraguay	25–7	25–15		50–22
25 Nov	13:30	Peru	2–0	Chile	25–22	25–19		50–41

== Final round ==
=== 5th/8th bracket ===
5th/8th bracket
2011-11-25 - Canelones
Colombia	2
Uruguay	0
2011-11-25 - Canelones
Venezuela	2
Paraguay	0

5th place match
2011-11-26 - Canelones
Colombia	2
Venezuela	0
7th place match
2011-11-26 - Canelones
Uruguay	0
Paraguay	2

=== Championship bracket ===
Semifinals
2011-11-26 - Canelones
Peru	2
Chile	0
2011-11-26 - Canelones
Brazil	2
Argentina	1

Final
2011-11-26 - Canelones
Peru	0
Brazil	3
3rd place
2011-11-26 - Canelones
Chile	2
Argentina	3

=== 5th to 8th classification ===
Date	Time		Score		Set 1	Set 2	Set 3	Total
25 Nov	15:00	Colombia	2–0	Uruguay	25–8	25–16		50–24
25 Nov	16:30	Venezuela	2–0	Paraguay	25–20	25–23		50–43

=== Semifinals ===
Date	Time		Score		Set 1	Set 2	Set 3	Total
26 Nov	9:00	Peru	2–0	Chile	25–19	25–11		50–30
26 Nov	10:30	Brazil	2–1	Argentina	25–20	26–28	16–14	67–62

=== Seventh place match ===
Date	Time		Score		Set 1	Set 2	Set 3	Total
26 Nov	13:00	Uruguay	0–2	Paraguay	12–25	24–26		36–51

=== Fifth place match ===
Date	Time		Score		Set 1	Set 2	Set 3	Total
26 Nov	14:30	Colombia	2–0	Venezuela	25–19	25–19		50–38

=== Bronze Medal match ===
Date	Time		Score		Set 1	Set 2	Set 3	Set 4	Set 5	Total
26 Nov	18:30	Chile	2–3	Argentina	15–25	25–21	16–25	25–20	10–15	91–106

=== Gold Medal match ===
Date	Time		Score		Set 1	Set 2	Set 3	Set 4	Set 5	Total
26 Nov	20:00	Peru	0–3	Brazil	21–25	21–25	23–25			65–75

== Final standing ==
Rank	Team
1st place, gold medalist(s)	Brazil
2nd place, silver medalist(s)	Peru
3rd place, bronze medalist(s)	Argentina
4	Chile
5	Colombia
6	Venezuela
7	Paraguay
8	Uruguay

2011 Girls' U16 South American Volleyball champions

Brazil
1st title

== Individual awards ==
- Most valuable player
  - Drussyla Costa (BRA)
- Best scorer
  - Ángela Leyva (PER)
- Best spiker
  - Ángela Leyva (PER)
- Best blocker
  - Amanda Brock (BRA)
- Best server
  - Rosa Valiente (PER)
- Best setter
  - Manuela Vargas (COL)
- Best receiver
  - Irene Veracio (ARG)
- Best digger
  - Violeta Delgado (PER)
- Best libero
  - Lais Vasques (BRA)
