= Manuela Vargas (volleyball) =

Colombian volleyball player (born 1996)

Personal information
- Nickname: Manu
- Nationality: Colombian
- Born: 13 September 1996 (age 30); Medellin
- Hometown: Medellin
- Height: 175 cm (5 ft 9 in)
- Weight: 69 kg (152 lb)
- Spike: 299 cm (118 in)
- Block: 281 cm (111 in)
- Education: Missouri Baptist University

Volleyball information
- Position: Setter
- Number: 6

Career
Years	Teams
2015 2016 (2020-2021)	[Liga Antioqueña] [Miami dade College] [Missouri Baptist University]

National team
2011-2015	Colombia

Manuela Vargas (born 13 September 1996) is a Colombian volleyball player. She is part of the Colombia women's national volleyball team.

She participated in the 2015 FIVB Volleyball World Grand Prix. On club level she played for Liga Antioqueña in 2015.
