= Girls' U17 South American Volleyball Championship =

- Current season, competition or edition: 2025 Girls' U17 South American Volleyball Championship
- Sport: Volleyball
- Founded: 2011
- Continent: South America (CSV)
- Most recent champion: Venezuela (1st title)
- Most titles: Brazil (2 titles); Peru (2 titles); Argentina (2 titles)

The Girls' U17 South American Volleyball Championship is a sport competition for national women's volleyball teams with players under 17 years, currently held biannually and organized by the Confederación Sudamericana de Voleibol (CSV), the South American volleyball federation. The first edition of the tournament was played in Canelones, Uruguay from November 21 to 26.Until the 2019 edition, the tournament was called the Girls' U16 South American Volleyball Championship.

== Results summary ==
| Year | Host | Final | | | 3rd place match | | | Teams |
| Year | Host | Champions | Score | Runners-up | 3rd place | Score | 4th place | Teams |
|---|---|---|---|---|---|---|---|---|
| 2011; Details | (Uruguay); Canelones | Brazil | 3–0 | Peru | Argentina | 3–2 | Chile | 8 |
| 2013; Details | (Colombia); Popayán | Brazil | 3–2 | Argentina | Peru | 3–0 | Chile | 8 |
| 2014; Details | (Peru); Lurigancho-Chosica | Peru | 3–0 | Argentina | Bolivia | 3–2 | Chile | 5 |
| 2015; Details | (Peru); Tarapoto | Peru | 3–0 | Bolivia | Chile | 3–0 | Colombia | 7 |
| 2017; Details | (Paraguay); Asunción | Argentina | 3–1 | Peru | Chile | 3–1 | Colombia | 8 |
| 2019; Details | (Peru); Callao | Chile | Round-robin | Peru | Paraguay | Round-robin | Ecuador | 5 |
| 2023; Details | (Peru); Callao | Argentina | 3–2 | Brazil | Peru | 3–1 | Ecuador | 7 |
| 2025; Details | (Peru); Lima | Venezuela | 3–0 | Brazil | Peru | 3–0 | Chile | 7 |

== Medals summary ==
| Rank | Nation | Gold | Silver | Bronze | Total |
|---|---|---|---|---|---|
| 1 | Peru | 2 | 3 | 3 | 8 |
| 2 | Argentina | 2 | 2 | 1 | 5 |
| 3 | Brazil | 2 | 2 | 0 | 4 |
| 4 | Chile | 1 | 0 | 2 | 3 |
| 5 | Venezuela | 1 | 0 | 0 | 1 |
| 6 | Bolivia | 0 | 1 | 1 | 2 |
| 7 | Paraguay | 0 | 0 | 1 | 1 |
| Totals (7 entries) | | 8 | 8 | 8 | 24 |

== Most valuable player by edition ==
- 2011 – Drussyla Costa (BRA)
- 2013 – Ana Beatriz Franklin (BRA)
- 2014 – Kiara Montes (PER)
- 2015 – Nayeli Vilchez (PER)
- 2017 – Bianca Cugno (ARG)
- 2019 – Ana Erskine (CHI)
- 2023 – Justina Fortes (ARG)

== See also ==
- Boys' U17 South American Volleyball Championship
- Women's U22 South American Volleyball Championship
- Women's Junior South American Volleyball Championship
- Girls' Youth South American Volleyball Championship
