= Volleyball at the 2019 European Youth Summer Olympic Festival =

- Venue: Darnagul Arena; MES Sport and Health Center
- Dates: 22–27 July
- Competitors: 192 from 11 nations

Volleyball at the 2019 European Youth Summer Olympic Festival was held in two venues in Azerbaijan. Volleyball matches were held at the Darnagul Arena and the MES Sport and Health Center, Baku from 22 to 27 July 2019.

== Competition schedule ==
All times are local Azerbaijan Time (UTC+4).

P	Preliminary round	½	Semi-finals	B	Bronze medal match	F	Gold medal match

Date Event	Mon 22	Tue 23	Wed 24	Fri 26	Sat 27	
Boys	P			½	B	F
Girls	P			½	B	F

== Boys competition ==
=== Preliminary round ===
==== Pool A ====
Pos	Team	Pld	W	L	Pts	SW	SL	SR	SPW	SPL	SPR	Qualification
1	Russia	3	3	0	9	9	0	MAX	225	158	1.424	Semifinals
2	Belarus	3	2	1	6	6	4	1.500	235	204	1.152	Semifinals
3	Germany	3	1	2	3	4	6	0.667	214	244	0.877	
4	Azerbaijan	3	0	3	0	0	9	0.000	163	231	0.706	

==== Pool B ====
Pos	Team	Pld	W	L	Pts	SW	SL	SR	SPW	SPL	SPR	Qualification
1	Italy	3	2	1	7	8	4	2.000	286	252	1.135	Semifinals
2	Belgium	3	2	1	5	7	6	1.167	299	298	1.003	Semifinals
3	Bulgaria	3	1	2	4	7	8	0.875	320	326	0.982	
4	Czech Republic	3	1	2	2	4	8	0.500	249	278	0.896	

=== Knockout stage ===
Semi-finals
26 July
Russia	2
Belgium	3
26 July
Italy	3
Belarus	1

Final
27 July
Belgium	0
Italy	3
Third place
27 July
Russia	3
Belarus	1

=== Classification Stage ===
Classification 5–8
26 July
Germany	2
Czech Republic	3
26 July
Bulgaria	3
Azerbaijan	0

Fifth place
27 July
Czech Republic	3
Bulgaria	0
Seventh place
27 July
Germany	3
Azerbaijan	1

== Girls competition ==
=== Preliminary round ===
==== Pool A ====
Pos	Team	Pld	W	L	Pts	SW	SL	SR	SPW	SPL	SPR	Qualification
1	Russia	3	3	0	9	9	1	9.000	246	194	1.268	Semifinals
2	Romania	3	2	1	6	7	4	1.750	252	223	1.130	Semifinals
3	Ukraine	3	1	2	3	3	6	0.500	171	204	0.838	
4	Bulgaria	3	0	3	0	1	9	0.111	193	241	0.801	

==== Pool B ====
Pos	Team	Pld	W	L	Pts	SW	SL	SR	SPW	SPL	SPR	Qualification
1	Italy	3	2	1	6	6	3	2.000	216	187	1.155	Semifinals
2	Turkey	3	2	1	5	6	5	1.200	254	243	1.045	Semifinals
3	Germany	3	1	2	4	5	7	0.714	240	253	0.949	
4	Belarus	3	1	2	3	4	6	0.667	213	240	0.888	

=== Knockout stage ===
Semi-finals
26 July
Russia	3
Turkey	1
26 July
Italy	2
Romania	3

Final
27 July
Russia	3
Romania	1
Third place
27 July
Turkey	3
Italy	0

=== Classification Stage ===
Classification 5–8
26 July
Ukraine	1
Belarus	3
26 July
Germany	3
Bulgaria	0

Fifth place
27 July
Belarus	3
Germany	1
Seventh place
27 July
Ukraine	3
Bulgaria	0

== Medal summary ==
=== Medal table ===
Rank	Nation	Gold	Silver	Bronze	Total
1	Russia (RUS)	1	0	1	2
2	Italy (ITA)	1	0	0	1
3	Belgium (BEL)	0	1	0	1
3	Romania (ROU)	0	1	0	1
5	Turkey (TUR)	0	0	1	1
Totals (5 entries)		2	2	2	6

=== Medalists ===
Event	Gold	Silver	Bronze
Boys	Italy; Damiano Catania; Leonardo Ferrato; Federico Crosato; Alessandro Michieletto; Piervito Disabato; Alberto Pol; Tommaso Stefani; Alessandro Gianotti; Giulio Magalini; Tommaso Rinaldi; Paolo Porro; Nicola Cianciotta	Belgium; Samuel Fafchamps; Liam McCluskey; Joost Peeters; Seppe Rotty; Simon Plaskie; Lennert Van Elsen; Wout D'Heer; Martin Perin; Thiemen Ocket; Daan De Saedeleer; Michiel Fransen; Robbe Van De Velde	Russia; Anton Anoshko; Artyom Korneyev; Mikhail Fedorov; Iurii Brazhniuk; Nikita Gorbanov; Stanislav Dineykin; Danil Kharitonov; Ilya Kazachenkov; Omar Kurbanov; Roman Murashko; Korney Enns; Ilia Fedorov
Girls	Russia; Elizaveta Kochurina; Valeriia Perova; Tatiana Seliutina; Anastasiia Chernova; Elizaveta Gosheva; Vita Akimova; Elizaveta Popova; Ortal Ivgi; Alexandra Murushkina; Varvara Shubina; Valeriia Gorbunova; Natalia Slautina	Romania; Andra Cojocaru; Alexandra Spinoche; Mădălina Airoaie; Andreea Murar; Adriana Alexandru; Maria Dulău; Georgiana Popa; Alexia Căruțașu; Denisa Ionescu; Mara Dumitrescu; Francesca Alupei; Isabela Murariu	Turkey; Ece Su Soner; Elif Su Eriçek; Hanife Nur Özaydinli; Damla Tokman; İpar Özay Kurt; Gülce Güçtekin; Çağla Salih; Peyman Yardımcı; Sude Hacımustafaoğlu; Mehtap Öztunalı; Lila Şengün; İlayda Dinçer
