= France women's national under-19 volleyball team =

Youth volleyball team representing France

France U19
- Association: French Volleyball Federation
- Confederation: CEV

Uniforms
Home	Away	Third

FIVB U19 World Championship
- Appearances: 2 (First in 1993)
- Best result: 9th place : (1993, 1995)

Europe U18 / U17 Championship
- Appearances: 2 (First in 2007)
- Best result: 8th place : (2007)
- French Volleyball Federation (in French)

The France women's national under-19 volleyball team represents France in international women's volleyball competitions and friendly matches under the age 19 and it is ruled and managed by the French Volleyball Federation That is an affiliate of Federation of International Volleyball FIVB and also a part of European Volleyball Confederation CEV.

== Results ==
=== Summer Youth Olympics ===
Champions Runners up Third place Fourth place

Youth Olympic Games
Year	Round	Position	Pld	W	L	SW	SL	Squad
(Singapore) 2010	Didn't qualify							
(China) 2014	No Volleyball Event							
(Argentina) 2018	No Volleyball Event							
Total	0 Titles	0/1						

=== FIVB U19 World Championship ===
Champions Runners up Third place Fourth place

FIVB U19 World Championship
Year	Round	Position	Pld	W	L	SW	SL	Squad
(Brazil) 1989	Didn't qualify							
(Portugal) 1991	Didn't qualify							
(Czechoslovakia) 1993		9th place						Squad
(France) 1995		9th place						Squad
(Thailand) 1997	Didn't qualify							
(Portugal) 1999	Didn't qualify							
(Croatia) 2001	Didn't qualify							
(Poland) 2003	Didn't qualify							
(Macau) 2005	Didn't qualify							
(Mexico) 2007	Didn't qualify							
(Thailand) 2009	Didn't qualify							
(Turkey) 2011	Didn't qualify							
(Thailand) 2013	Didn't qualify							
(Peru) 2015	Didn't qualify							
(Argentina) 2017	Didn't qualify							
(Egypt) 2019	Didn't qualify							
(Mexico) 2021	Didn't qualify							
(Croatia) (Hungary) 2023	Didn't qualify							
(Croatia) (Serbia) 2025	Didn't qualify							
2027	Qualified							
Total	0 Titles	2/15						

=== Europe U18 / U17 Championship ===
Champions Runners up Third place Fourth place

Europe U18 / U17 Championship
Year	Round	Position	Pld	W	L	SW	SL	Squad
(Spain) 1995	Didn't qualify							
(Slovakia) 1997	Didn't qualify							
(Poland) 1999	Didn't qualify							
(Czech Republic) 2001	Didn't qualify							
(Croatia) 2003	Didn't qualify							
(Estonia) 2005	Didn't qualify							
(Czech Republic) 2007		8th place						Squad
(Netherlands) 2009	Didn't qualify							
(Turkey) 2011	Didn't qualify							
(Montenegro) / (Serbia) 2013		11th place						Squad
(Bulgaria) 2015	Didn't qualify							
(Netherlands) 2017	Didn't qualify							
(Bulgaria) 2018	Didn't qualify							
(Montenegro) 2020	Didn't qualify							
(Czech Republic) 2022	Didn't qualify							
(Romania) (Greece) 2024	Didn't qualify							
(Latvia) (Lithuania) 2026	TBD							
Total	0 Titles	2/13						

== Team ==
=== Current squad ===
The Following players is the French players that Competed in the 2018 Girls' U17 Volleyball European Championship

#	Name	Position	Height	Weight	Birthday	Spike	Block
2	rovira fétia-here	opposite	191	82	2003	315	294
3	henyo julie	opposite	176	68	2002	300	285
4	respaut emilie	setter	177	56	2003	283	267
5	tomczyk ambre	setter	180	62	2002	285	268
	Ackx léa	middle-blocker	183	68	2002	294	278
	Bah halimatou	middle-blocker	180	62	2003	293	274
	Baudu héléna	outside-spiker	177	60	2003	284	270
	Caillard lilou	middle-blocker	171	62	2002	271	259
	Del moral eva	setter	180	65	2002	287	271
	Dia aminata	middle-blocker	182	70	2002	292	278
	Diouf guewe	opposite	182	75	2002	315	290
	Dornic martinaya	outside-spiker	166	66	2003	280	267
	Lajmi elyssa	outside-spiker	178	66	2002	288	270
	Marquet camille	middle-blocker	178	68	2002	295	280
	Meyer lou	outside-spiker	178	62	2002	285	270
	Polet inga	outside-spiker	191	70	2002	293	280
	Ratahiry leïa	outside-spiker	174	61	2002	297	278
	Romati sara	libero	165	55	2002	274	266
	Secretant noémie	outside-spiker	183	65	2003	292	272
	Selosse enora	outside-spiker	175	66	2002	285	265
	Tritz apolline	libero	162	53	2002	273	264
	Vidaller stella	libero	160	50	2002	270	261
	Villette juliette	middle-blocker	183	70	2002	293	277
