= Slovenia women's national under-19 volleyball team =

Slovenia U19
- Association: Volleyball Federation of Slovenia
- Confederation: CEV

Uniforms
Home	Away	Third

FIVB U19 World Championship
- Appearances: 2 (First in 2013)
- Best result: 13th place : (2013)

Europe U18 / U17 Championship
- Appearances: 5 (First in 2011)
- Best result: 5th place : (2017)
- Official website

The Slovenia women's national under-19 volleyball team represents Slovenia in international women's volleyball competitions under the age of 19 and is controlled by the Volleyball Federation of Slovenia, which is an affiliate of the Federation of International Volleyball (FIVB) and also a part of the European Volleyball Confederation (CEV).

== Results ==
=== Summer Youth Olympics ===
Champions Runners up Third place Fourth place

Youth Olympic Games
Year	Round	Position	Pld	W	L	SW	SL	Squad
(Singapore) 2010	Didn't qualify							
(China) 2014	No Volleyball Event							
(Argentina) 2018	No Volleyball Event							
Total	0 Titles	0/1						

=== FIVB U19 World Championship ===
Champions Runners up Third place Fourth place

FIVB U19 World Championship
Year	Round	Position	Pld	W	L	SW	SL	Squad
(Brazil) 1989	Didn't qualify							
(Portugal) 1991	Didn't qualify							
(Czechoslovakia) 1993	Didn't qualify							
(France) 1995	Didn't qualify							
(Thailand) 1997	Didn't qualify							
(Portugal) 1999	Didn't qualify							
(Croatia) 2001	Didn't qualify							
(Poland) 2003	Didn't qualify							
(Macau) 2005	Didn't qualify							
(Mexico) 2007	Didn't qualify							
(Thailand) 2009	Didn't qualify							
(Turkey) 2011	Didn't qualify							
(Thailand) 2013		13th place						Squad
(Peru) 2015	Didn't qualify							
(Argentina) 2017		15th place						Squad
(Egypt) 2019	Didn't qualify							
(Mexico) 2021	Didn't qualify							
Total	0 Titles	2/17						

=== Europe U18 / U17 Championship ===
Champions Runners up Third place Fourth place

Europe U18 / U17 Championship
Year	Round	Position	Pld	W	L	SW	SL	Squad
(Spain) 1995	Didn't qualify							
(Slovakia) 1997	Didn't qualify							
(Poland) 1999	Didn't qualify							
(Czech Republic) 2001	Didn't qualify							
(Croatia) 2003	Didn't qualify							
(Estonia) 2005	Didn't qualify							
(Czech Republic) 2007	Didn't qualify							
(Netherlands) 2009	Didn't qualify							
(Turkey) 2011		9th place						Squad
(Montenegro) / (Serbia) 2013		6th place						Squad
(Bulgaria) 2015		12th place						Squad
(Netherlands) 2017		5th place						Squad
(Bulgaria) 2018		8th place						Squad
(Montenegro) 2020		7th place						Squad
Total	0 Titles	5/14						

== Team ==
=== Current squad ===
The following is the Slovenian roster in the 2017 FIVB Girls' U18 World Championship.

Head coach: Joze Casar

No.	Name	Date of birth	Height	Weight	Spike	Block	2017 club
1	Tonka Pucnik	21 April 2000	1.82 m (6 ft 0 in)	66 kg (146 lb)	288 cm (113 in)	268 cm (106 in)	OK NOVA KBM BRANIK
2	Eva Pogačar	14 July 2000	1.85 m (6 ft 1 in)	70 kg (150 lb)	293 cm (115 in)	270 cm (110 in)	MLADI JESENICE
4	Zana Zdovc Sporer	22 March 2002	1.86 m (6 ft 1 in)	70 kg (150 lb)	290 cm (110 in)	267 cm (105 in)	OK COMET ZRECE
5	Eva Zatkovic	2 August 2001	1.88 m (6 ft 2 in)	63 kg (139 lb)	292 cm (115 in)	269 cm (106 in)	CALCIT VOLLEYBALL
6	Alja Jerala	26 July 2000	1.78 m (5 ft 10 in)	57 kg (126 lb)	288 cm (113 in)	257 cm (101 in)	OK NOVA KBM BRANIK
7	Nika Bavdaz	4 July 2000	1.77 m (5 ft 10 in)	63 kg (139 lb)	288 cm (113 in)	258 cm (102 in)	OK GORICA
8	Brina Bracko	12 January 2000	1.80 m (5 ft 11 in)	60 kg (130 lb)	291 cm (115 in)	254 cm (100 in)	OK NOVA KBM BRANIK
10	Ajda Scuka	23 October 2000	1.79 m (5 ft 10 in)	63 kg (139 lb)	283 cm (111 in)	260 cm (100 in)	OD KRIM
11	Nika Cigale	6 May 2000	1.80 m (5 ft 11 in)	63 kg (139 lb)	294 cm (116 in)	272 cm (107 in)	OK MOZIRJE
14	Tali Lekse	1 July 2000	1.81 m (5 ft 11 in)	65 kg (143 lb)	292 cm (115 in)	268 cm (106 in)	ŽOK MISLINJA
15	Anja Mazej	4 January 2000	1.68 m (5 ft 6 in)	50 kg (110 lb)	269 cm (106 in)	257 cm (101 in)	OK SPODNJA SAVINJSKA
18	Manja Jerala	22 January 2002	1.83 m (6 ft 0 in)	68 kg (150 lb)	286 cm (113 in)	265 cm (104 in)	CALCIT LJUBLJANA
