= Alexia Căruțașu =

Female volleyball player

- Căruțașu of Galatasaray (2025)

Personal information
- Full name: Alexia Ioana Căruțașu
- Nationality: (Turkey) Turkish (Romania) Romanian
- Born: 10 June 2003 (age 23); Bucharest, Romania
- Height: 1.88 m (6 ft 2 in)
- Spike: 3.00 m (118 in)
- Block: 2.77 m (109 in)

Volleyball information
- Position: Opposite
- Current club: Galatasaray
- Number: 14

Career
Years	Teams
2016–2018	(Romania) CSM București
2018–2019	(Turkey) VakıfBank Istanbul
2019–2021	(Turkey) Sistem9 Yeşilyurt Istanbul
2021–2022	(Turkey) →Galatasaray
2022–2024	(Turkey) VakıfBank Istanbul
2024–	(Turkey) Galatasaray

National team
2018–2022; 2024–	Romania; Turkey
Honours
Women’s volleyball
Representing Romania
European Youth Olympic Festival
Silver medal – second place	2019 Baku	Team

Alexia Ioana Căruțașu (Turkish: Aleksia Karutasu; (born 10 June 2003) is a professional volleyball player who plays for Galatasaray and the Turkey national team. Born in Romania, she previously played for the Romania national team.

== Personal life ==
Her parents Andreea and Virgil Căruțașu were both Romanian basketball players.

She speaks some Turkish, and in December 2021, she stated that she wished to obtain Turkish citizenship. Late September 2024, it was announced that after her application to obtain Turkish citizenship was officially approved, she was naturalized as a citizen of Turkey. She will become eligible to play in the Turkey national team as of January 2025.

== Club career ==
She is the youngest debutant (13 years, four months) in the Divizia A1 history. She made her Romanian top-flight debut with CSM București in October 2016, coming on as a substitute against CSM Volei Alba Blaj.

=== Galatasaray ===
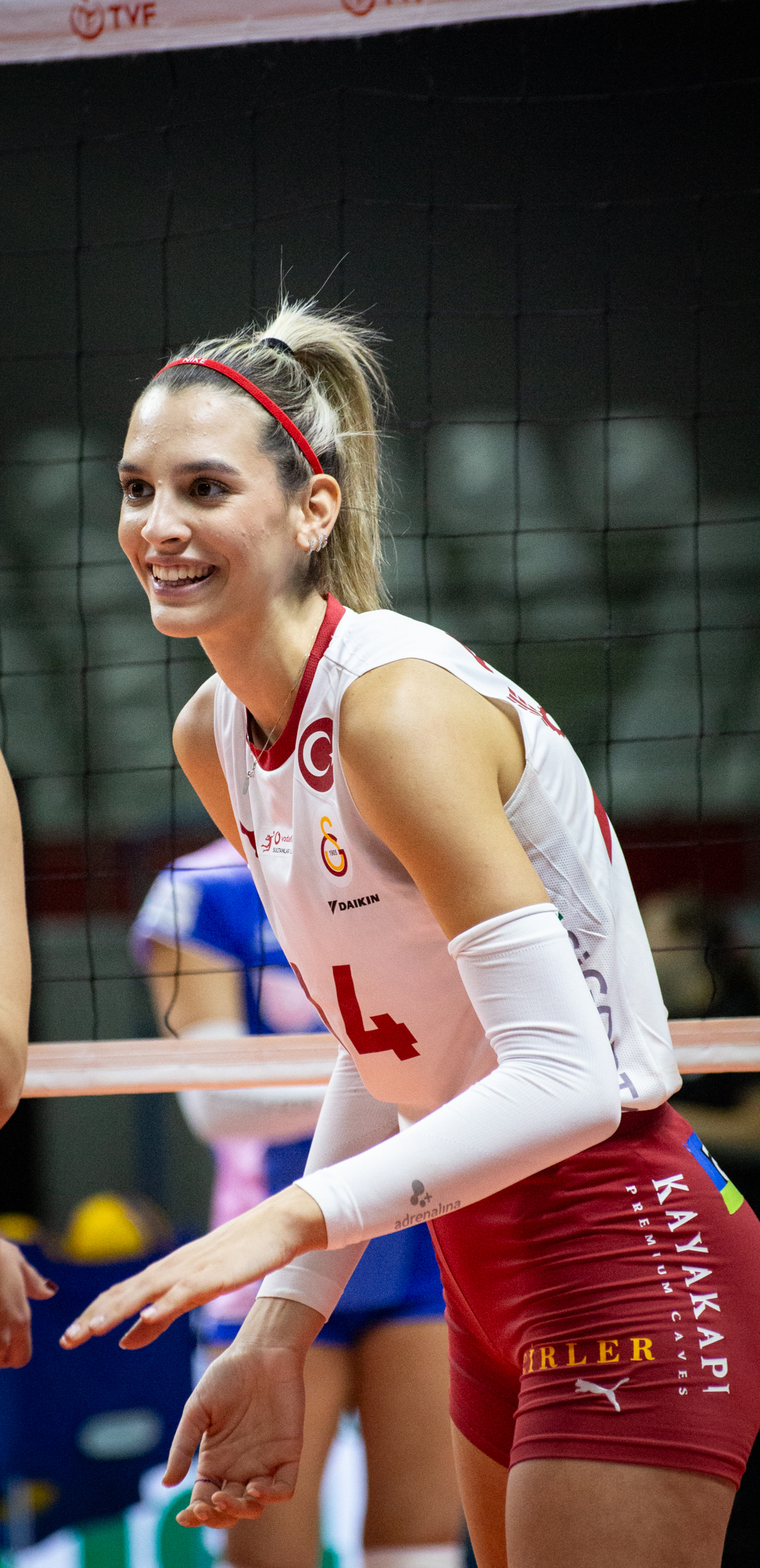
Căruțașu of Galatasaray (2024)

On 14 May 2021, she signed a contract with Galatasaray on loan from VakıfBank Istanbul for one season.

It was announced that she returned to the Galatasaray team on 13 May 2024. The signed contract is for two years.

She signed a new 1 + 1 year contract with Galatasaray on February 2, 2026.

== International career ==
=== Romania ===
She competed at the 2019 FIVB Volleyball Girls' U18 World Championship, where Romania ranked sixth. She also competed at the 2018 Girls' U17 Volleyball European Championship, where the Romanian team placed fifth.

=== Turkey ===
Following her naturalization, she was selected to the Turkey women's national volleyball team, and debuted at the 2025 AIA AeQuilibrim Cup Women Elite held in Italy, which was a preparation tournament of the Turkey nationals for the upcoming 2025 FIVB Women's Volleyball Nations League. She scored the most points of the national team, which finished the cup as champion.

She played her first official match for Turkey at the 2025 FIVB Women's Volleyball Nations League. In the fourth league match against China on 8 June 2025, she scored 38 points, became so the top scorer of the game, and played a big role in the victory of the national team by 3-2, which remained unbeaten after four matches of the first league week in Beijing, China.

== Achievements ==
- Divizia A1:
  - Winner: 2018
- Cupa României:
  - Winner: 2018
- CEV Challenge Cup:
  - Winner: 2021
- European Youth Olympic Festival:
  - Silver Medalist: 2019
- BVA Cup:
  - Winner: 2024–25
- Women's CEV Cup:
  - Winner: 2025–26

== Individual awards ==
- Romanian Volleyball Player of the Year: 2021
- CEV Challenge Cup Top Scorer (128 points): 2021
