= Volleyball at the 2019 European Youth Summer Olympic Festival – Girls tournament =

Girls volleyball at the 2019 European Youth Summer Olympic Festival
- Venue: Darnagul Arena; MES Sport and Health Center
- Date: 22–27 July
- Competitors: 96 from 8 nations

Medalists
gold medal	Russia
silver medal	Romania
bronze medal	Turkey

The girls tournament in volleyball at the 2019 European Youth Summer Olympic Festival was held from 22 to 27 July at the Darnagul Arena and the MES Sport and Health Center in Baku, Azerbaijan.

== Competition schedule ==
P	Preliminary round	½	Semi-finals	B	Bronze medal match	F	Gold medal match

Mon 22	Tue 23	Wed 24	Fri 26	Sat 27	
P			½	B	F

== Participating teams ==
- Belarus
- Bulgaria
- Germany
- Italy
- Romania
- Russia
- Turkey
- Ukraine

== Pool composition ==
=== Preliminary round ===
Pool A	Pool B
Bulgaria	Belarus
Romania	Germany
Russia	Italy
Ukraine	Turkey

=== Group A ===
Pos	Team	Pld	W	L	Pts	SW	SL	SR	SPW	SPL	SPR	Qualification
1	Russia	3	3	0	9	9	1	9.000	246	194	1.268	Semifinals
2	Romania	3	2	1	6	7	4	1.750	252	223	1.130	Semifinals
3	Ukraine	3	1	2	3	3	6	0.500	171	204	0.838	
4	Bulgaria	3	0	3	0	1	9	0.111	193	241	0.801	

Date	Time		Score		Set 1	Set 2	Set 3	Set 4	Set 5	Total	Report
22 Jul	11:30	Romania	3–1	Bulgaria	25–23	25–18	16–25	25–12		91–78	P2^{[usurped]} P3^{[usurped]}
22 Jul	16:30	Ukraine	0–3	Russia	17–25	17–25	13–25			47–75	P2^{[usurped]} P3^{[usurped]}
23 Jul	11:30	Bulgaria	0–3	Russia	19–25	19–25	23–25			61–75	P2^{[usurped]} P3^{[usurped]}
23 Jul	16:30	Romania	3–0	Ukraine	25–17	25–18	25–14			75–49	P2^{[usurped]} P3^{[usurped]}
24 Jul	11:30	Russia	3–1	Romania	25–16	25–20	19–25	27–25		96–86	P2^{[usurped]} P3^{[usurped]}
24 Jul	16:30	Bulgaria	0–3	Ukraine	16–25	23–25	15–25			54–75	P2^{[usurped]} P3^{[usurped]}

=== Group B ===
Pos	Team	Pld	W	L	Pts	SW	SL	SR	SPW	SPL	SPR	Qualification
1	Italy	3	2	1	6	6	3	2.000	216	187	1.155	Semifinals
2	Turkey	3	2	1	5	6	5	1.200	254	243	1.045	Semifinals
3	Germany	3	1	2	4	5	7	0.714	240	253	0.949	
4	Belarus	3	1	2	3	4	6	0.667	213	240	0.888	

Date	Time		Score		Set 1	Set 2	Set 3	Set 4	Set 5	Total	Report
22 Jul	14:00	Belarus	3–0	Turkey	30–28	25–22	26–24			81–74	P2^{[usurped]} P3^{[usurped]}
22 Jul	19:00	Germany	0–3	Italy	20–25	13–25	20–25			53–75	P2^{[usurped]} P3^{[usurped]}
23 Jul	14:00	Turkey	3–0	Italy	25–21	25–22	25–23			75–66	P2^{[usurped]} P3^{[usurped]}
23 Jul	19:00	Belarus	1–3	Germany	25–16	17–25	18–25	13–25		73–91	P2^{[usurped]} P3^{[usurped]}
24 Jul	14:00	Italy	3–0	Belarus	25–22	25–19	25–18			75–59	P2^{[usurped]} P3^{[usurped]}
24 Jul	19:00	Turkey	3–2	Germany	25–21	25–18	18–25	22–25	15–7	105–96	P2^{[usurped]} P3^{[usurped]}

== Final round ==
=== Classification bracket ===
Classification 5–8
26 July
Ukraine	1
Belarus	3
26 July
Germany	3
Bulgaria	0

Fifth place
27 July
Belarus	3
Germany	1
Seventh place
27 July
Ukraine	3
Bulgaria	0

==== Classification 5–8 ====
Date	Time		Score		Set 1	Set 2	Set 3	Set 4	Set 5	Total	Report
26 Jul	11:30	Ukraine	1–3	Belarus	27–25	21–25	23–25	20–25		91–100	P2^{[usurped]} P3^{[usurped]}
26 Jul	14:00	Germany	3–0	Bulgaria	25–19	25–23	25–17			75–59	P2^{[usurped]} P3^{[usurped]}

==== Seventh place game ====
Date	Time		Score		Set 1	Set 2	Set 3	Set 4	Set 5	Total	Report
27 Jul	09:00	Ukraine	3–0	Bulgaria	25–18	25–23	25–21			75–62	P2^{[usurped]} P3^{[usurped]}

==== Fifth place game ====
Date	Time		Score		Set 1	Set 2	Set 3	Set 4	Set 5	Total	Report
27 Jul	14:00	Belarus	3–1	Germany	25–17	25–23	21–25	25–18		96–83	

=== Championship bracket ===
Semi-finals
26 July
Russia	3
Turkey	1
26 July
Italy	2
Romania	3

Final
27 July
Russia	3
Romania	1
Third place
27 July
Turkey	3
Italy	0

==== Semifinals ====
Date	Time		Score		Set 1	Set 2	Set 3	Set 4	Set 5	Total	Report
26 Jul	11:30	Russia	3–1	Turkey	25–22	20–25	25–22	25–21		95–90	P2^{[usurped]} P3^{[usurped]}
26 Jul	14:00	Italy	2–3	Romania	25–20	23–25	21–25	25–16	13–15	107–101	P2^{[usurped]} P3^{[usurped]}

==== Third place game ====
Date	Time		Score		Set 1	Set 2	Set 3	Set 4	Set 5	Total	Report
27 Jul	09:00	Turkey	3–0	Italy	25–23	25–21	25–23			75–67	P2^{[usurped]} P3^{[usurped]}

==== Final ====
Date	Time		Score		Set 1	Set 2	Set 3	Set 4	Set 5	Total	Report
27 Jul	11:30	Russia	3–1	Romania	23–25	25–16	25–19	25–17		98–77	P2^{[usurped]} P3^{[usurped]}

== Final standings ==
Rank	Team
1st place, gold medalist(s)	Russia
2nd place, silver medalist(s)	Romania
3rd place, bronze medalist(s)	Turkey
4	Italy
5	Belarus
6	Germany
7	Ukraine
8	Bulgaria
