= İpar Özay Kurt =

Turkish volleyball player (born 2003)

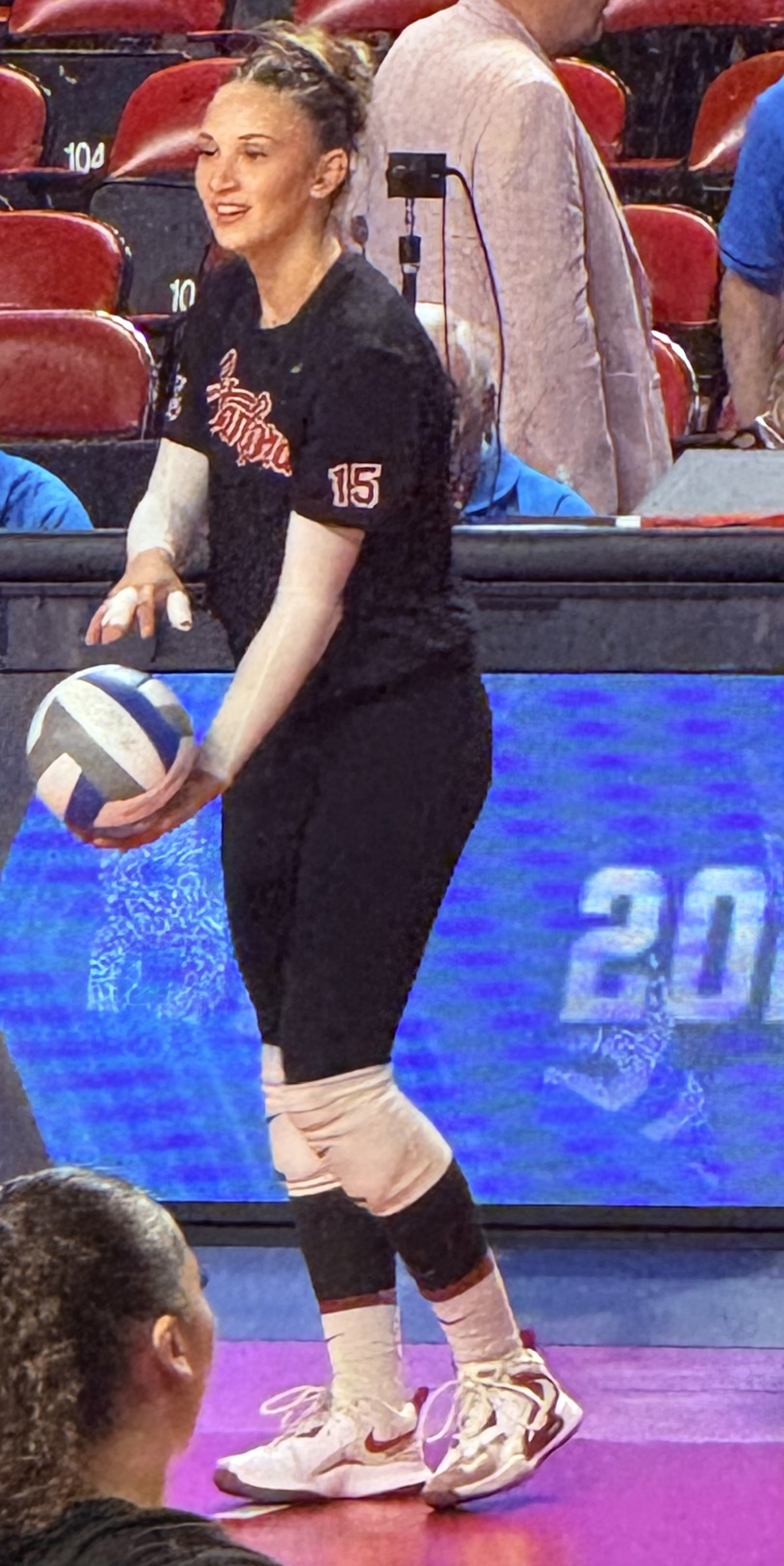
- Kurt in 2024

Personal information
- Nationality: Turkish
- Born: 10 November 2003 (age 22) Istanbul, Turkey
- Height: 1.86 m (6 ft 1 in)
- Weight: 69 kg (152 lb)
- Spike: 305 cm (120 in)
- Block: 290 cm (114 in)

Volleyball information
- Position: Wing spiker
- Current club: Stanford University

Career
- Years: Team
- 2017–2023; 2023–: Fenerbahçe; Stanford University

National team
- Years: Team
- 2017: Turkey U16
- 2018–2019: Turkey U18
- 2019–: Turkey U20
Honours
Women's volleyball
Representing Turkey
European Youth Olympic Festival
Bronze medal – third place	2019 Baku	Team
Junior European Championship
Gold medal – first place	2020 Zenica	Team
Youth European Championship
Bronze medal – third place	2018 Sofia	Team

İpar Özay Kurt (born 10 November 2003) is a Turkish volleyball player. She played for Fenerbahçe as wing spiker with jersey number 16 and now plays for Stanford University. She is 1.86 m (6 ft 1 in) tall at 69 kg (152 lb).

İpar Özay Kurt was born in Istanbul, Turkey on 10 November 2003.

== Club ==
After playing for the İlbank in Ankara, she joined the Istanbul-based club Fenerbahçe in 2017. Between 2015 and 2017, she enjoyed several local and national champion titles.

== International ==
=== Girls' U15/U16 ===
Kurt was part of the girls' national youth team, which finished the U16 Balkan Championship held in Sofia, Bulgaria in 2017 at fourth place.

=== Girls' U17/U18 ===
She won the bronze medal with the national U17/U18 team the 2018 Girls' U17 European Championship in Sofia, Bulgaria. She was a member of the bronze-medalist women's national U18 team at the 2019 European Youth Summer Olympic Festival held in Baku, Azerbaijan. Kurt played for the national team at the 2019 FIVB Girls' U18 World Championship in Cairo, Egypt, which ranked 9th. As of 2020, she has represented Turkish national youth and junior teams in 22 games.

=== Women's U19/U20 ===
She was named the "Most valuable player" of the 2020 Women's U19 European Championship in Zenica, Bosnia and Herzegovina, where the Turkey national U20 team became champion.

== Honours ==
=== Individual ===
- Most Valuable Player 2020 Women's U19 Volleyball European Championship

=== International ===
- 2018 Girls' U17 Volleyball European Championship – Third place
- 2019 European Youth Summer Olympic Festival – Third place
- 2020 Women's U19 Volleyball European Championship – Champion
