= Slovakia women's national under-19 volleyball team =

Slovakia U19
- Association: Slovak Volleyball Federation
- Confederation: CEV

Uniforms
| Home | Away | Third |

FIVB U19 World Championship
- Appearances: 4 (First in 1995)
- Best result: 7th place : (1995)

Europe U18 / U17 Championship
- Appearances: 5 (First in 1995)
- Best result: (bronze) Third Placed : (1995)
- www.svf.sk (in Slovak)
Honours
Representing Slovakia
European Championship
| Bronze medal – third place | 1995 Barcelona | Team |

The Slovakia women's national under-19 volleyball team represents Slovakia in international women's volleyball competitions and friendly matches under the age 19 and it is ruled and managed by the Slovak Volleyball Federation That is an affiliate of Federation of International Volleyball FIVB and also a part of European Volleyball Confederation CEV.

== Results ==
=== Summer Youth Olympics ===
Champions Runners up Third place Fourth place

Youth Olympic Games
| Year | Round | Position | Pld | W | L | SW | SL | Squad |
|---|---|---|---|---|---|---|---|---|
| (Singapore) 2010 | Didn't qualify | | | | | | | |
| (China) 2014 | No Volleyball Event | | | | | | | |
| (Argentina) 2018 | No Volleyball Event | | | | | | | |
| Total | 0 Titles | 0/1 | | | | | | |

=== FIVB U19 World Championship ===
Champions Runners up Third place Fourth place

FIVB U19 World Championship
| Year | Round | Position | Pld | W | L | SW | SL | Squad |
|---|---|---|---|---|---|---|---|---|
| (Brazil) 1989 | Didn't qualify | | | | | | | |
| (Portugal) 1991 | Didn't qualify | | | | | | | |
| (Czechoslovakia) 1993 | Didn't qualify | | | | | | | |
| (France) 1995 | | 7th place | | | | | | Squad |
| (Thailand) 1997 | | 9th place | | | | | | Squad |
| (Portugal) 1999 | Didn't qualify | | | | | | | |
| (Croatia) 2001 | Didn't qualify | | | | | | | |
| (Poland) 2003 | Didn't qualify | | | | | | | |
| (Macau) 2005 | Didn't qualify | | | | | | | |
| (Mexico) 2007 | Didn't qualify | | | | | | | |
| (Thailand) 2009 | | 14th place | | | | | | Squad |
| (Turkey) 2011 | | 10th place | | | | | | Squad |
| (Thailand) 2013 | Didn't qualify | | | | | | | |
| (Peru) 2015 | Didn't qualify | | | | | | | |
| (Argentina) 2017 | Didn't qualify | | | | | | | |
| (Egypt) 2019 | Didn't qualify | | | | | | | |
| (Mexico) 2021 | | 12th place | | | | | | Squad |
| Total | 0 Titles | 5/17 | | | | | | |

=== Europe U18 / U17 Championship ===
Champions Runners up Third place Fourth place

Europe U18 / U17 Championship
| Year | Round | Position | Pld | W | L | SW | SL | Squad |
|---|---|---|---|---|---|---|---|---|
| (Spain) 1995 | | Third place | | | | | | Squad |
| (Slovakia) 1997 | | 7th place | | | | | | Squad |
| (Poland) 1999 | Didn't qualify | | | | | | | |
| (Czech Republic) 2001 | Didn't qualify | | | | | | | |
| (Croatia) 2003 | Didn't qualify | | | | | | | |
| (Estonia) 2005 | Didn't qualify | | | | | | | |
| (Czech Republic) 2007 | Didn't qualify | | | | | | | |
| (Netherlands) 2009 | | 4th place | | | | | | Squad |
| (Turkey) 2011 | | 6th place | | | | | | Squad |
| (Montenegro) / (Serbia) 2013 | Didn't qualify | | | | | | | |
| (Bulgaria) 2015 | Didn't qualify | | | | | | | |
| (Netherlands) 2017 | Didn't qualify | | | | | | | |
| (Bulgaria) 2018 | Didn't qualify | | | | | | | |
| (Montenegro) 2020 | | 8th place | | | | | | Squad |
| (Czech Republic) 2022 | Didn't qualify | | | | | | | |
| Total | 0 Titles | 5/15 | | | | | | |

== Team ==
=== Current squad ===
The Following players is the Slovak players that Competed in the 2018 Girls' U17 Volleyball European Championship

| # | Name | Position | Height | Weight | Birthday | Spike | Block |
| | balazova sara | libero | 174 | 66 | 2003 | 290 | 270 |
| | chovanova emma | outside-spiker | 178 | 59 | 2003 | 281 | 270 |
| | ciernakristina | outside-spiker | 182 | 62 | 2002 | 292 | 279 |
| | dlhosova sara | outside-spiker | 173 | 55 | 2002 | 293 | 276 |
| | durisova ema | setter | 176 | 68 | 2002 | 284 | 265 |
| | frolova katarina | opposite | 184 | 68 | 2002 | 292 | 281 |
| | gajdosova petra | middle-blocker | 183 | 71 | 2003 | 294 | 282 |
| | hrusecka tezera | middle-blocker | 198 | 85 | 2002 | 305 | 293 |
| | kosikova paulina | libero | 168 | 50 | 2002 | 271 | 251 |
| | krcmarekova silvia | outside-spiker | 178 | 66 | 2002 | 286 | 269 |
| | kubova denisa | middle-blocker | 189 | 72 | 2003 | 291 | 281 |
| | kucserova karolina | outside-spiker | 188 | 63 | 2002 | 308 | 294 |
| | laucikova kristina | setter | 173 | 66 | 2002 | 283 | 264 |
| | matasova ema | outside-spiker | 182 | 61 | 2003 | 292 | 279 |
| | mikova natalia | libero | 166 | 49 | 2004 | 275 | 258 |
| | moravkova dominika | outside-spiker | 180 | 64 | 2003 | 293 | 277 |
| | navratova diana | opposite | 182 | 64 | 2003 | 292 | 279 |
| | nechojdomova michaela | libero | 164 | 62 | 2002 | 272 | 254 |
| | ozaniakova nikola | setter | 178 | 65 | 2002 | 286 | 270 |
| | podhradska veronika | outside-spiker | 178 | 65 | 2003 | 287 | 271 |
| | sivicekova sofia | setter | 168 | 69 | 2002 | 272 | 255 |
| | smieskova ema | middle-blocker | 185 | 73 | 2003 | 298 | 286 |
| | sobolovska rebeca | setter | 178 | 70 | 2002 | 285 | 266 |
| | sulekova diana | outside-spiker | 174 | 60 | 2002 | 279 | 265 |
| | vajdova martina | outside-spiker | 189 | 65 | 2003 | 309 | 287 |
