= 2020 Girls' U17 Volleyball European Championship =

Tournament details
- Host country: Montenegro
- Dates: 1–9 October 2020
- Teams: 11
- Venues: 2 (in 1 host city)

Final positions
- Champions: Russia (5th title)

Tournament awards
- MVP: (Russia) Arina Fedorovtseva

The 2020 Girls' Youth European Volleyball Championship was the 14th edition of the Girls' Youth European Volleyball Championship, a biennial international volleyball tournament organised by the European Volleyball Confederation (CEV) the girls' under-17 national teams of Europe. The tournament was held in Montenegro from 1 to 9 October 2020.

Same as previous editions, the tournament acted as the CEV qualifiers for the FIVB Volleyball Girls' U18 World Championship. The top six teams qualified for the 2021 FIVB Volleyball Girls' U18 World Championship as the CEV representatives.

== Qualification ==
The second round qualifying stage for the final tournament was cancelled due to the COVID-19 pandemic by the CEV on 15 June 2020. First round qualifiers were Serbia, Russia, Slovakia, Finland and Italy. The remaining six participants were determined from European Ranking after the respective National Federations confirmed their participation in the event. Despite securing their spot through winning the NEVZA qualifying event, Finland have withdrawn from the competition. The next best team from the relevant European Ranking – Poland – has taken their spot.

Means of qualification		Qualifier
Host Country		Montenegro
Qualification 1st round	BVA	Serbia
Qualification 1st round	EEVZA	Russia
Qualification 1st round	MEVZA	Slovakia
Qualification 1st round	NEVZA	~~Finland~~; Poland (11)
Qualification 1st round	WEVZA	Italy
~~Qualification 2nd round~~	~~Pool A~~	Belarus (3)
~~Qualification 2nd round~~	~~Pool B~~	Germany (4)
~~Qualification 2nd round~~	~~Pool C~~	Slovenia (4)
~~Qualification 2nd round~~	~~Pool D~~	Turkey (7)
~~Qualification 2nd round~~	~~Pool E~~	Bulgaria (7)
~~Qualification 2nd round~~	~~Best runner up~~	Romania (7)

== Pools composition ==
The drawing of lots was combined with a seeding of National Federations and performed as follows:

1. The host country Montenegro were seeded in Preliminary Pool I. Top country per European Ranking, Russia were seeded in Pool II.
2. Remaining 10 participating teams drawn after they were previously placed in five cups as per their position in the latest European Ranking

Pot 1	Pot 2	Pot 3	Pot 4	Pot 5
Italy (2); Belarus (3)	Germany (4); Slovenia (4)	Serbia (4); Turkey (7)	Bulgaria (7); Romania (7)	Poland (11); Slovakia (24)

Result

Pool I	Pool II
Montenegro	Russia
Italy	Belarus
Slovenia	Germany
Turkey	Serbia
Bulgaria	Romania
Slovakia	Poland

Before the start of the tournament it was announced that Germany have withdrawn due to travel restrictions imposed by COVID-19 pandemic.

== Preliminary round ==
=== Pool I ===
Pos	Team	Pld	W	L	Pts	SW	SL	SR	SPW	SPL	SPR	Qualification
1	Turkey	5	5	0	14	15	3	5.000	423	309	1.369	Semifinals
2	Italy	5	4	1	12	13	5	2.600	435	355	1.225	Semifinals
3	Slovenia	5	3	2	10	12	6	2.000	399	362	1.102	5th–8th semifinals
4	Slovakia	5	2	3	6	7	10	0.700	359	362	0.992	5th–8th semifinals
5	Bulgaria	5	1	4	2	4	14	0.286	337	427	0.789	
6	Montenegro	5	0	5	1	2	15	0.133	258	396	0.652	

Date	Time		Score		Set 1	Set 2	Set 3	Set 4	Set 5	Total	Report
1 Oct	15:00	Bulgaria	0–3	Turkey	11–25	19–25	21–25			51–75	Report
1 Oct	17:30	Slovenia	1–3	Italy	28–26	16–25	22–25	15–25		81–101	Report
1 Oct	20:00	Montenegro	0–3	Slovakia	12–25	16–25	9–25			37–75	Report
2 Oct	15:00	Turkey	3–2	Slovenia	16–25	25–21	21–25	25–15	15–5	102–91	Report
2 Oct	17:30	Slovakia	1–3	Italy	25–22	19–25	19–25	21–25		84–97	Report
2 Oct	20:00	Montenegro	2–3	Bulgaria	23–25	25–16	19–25	25–15	10–15	102–96	Report
3 Oct	15:00	Italy	1–3	Turkey	26–28	25–18	16–25	20–25		87–96	Report
3 Oct	17:30	Bulgaria	1–3	Slovakia	18–25	16–25	25–23	19–25		78–98	Report
3 Oct	20:00	Slovenia	3–0	Montenegro	25–12	25–10	25–18			75–40	Report
5 Oct	15:00	Slovakia	0–3	Turkey	11–25	15–25	17–25			43–75	Report
5 Oct	17:30	Bulgaria	0–3	Slovenia	20–25	25–27	15–25			60–77	Report
5 Oct	20:00	Montenegro	0–3	Italy	13–25	13–25	16–25			42–75	Report
6 Oct	15:00	Slovenia	3–0	Slovakia	25–17	25–20	25–22			75–59	Report
6 Oct	17:30	Italy	3–0	Bulgaria	25–22	25–13	25–17			75–52	Report
6 Oct	20:00	Turkey	3–0	Montenegro	25–10	25–17	25–10			75–37	Report

=== Pool II ===
Pos	Team	Pld	W	L	Pts	SW	SL	SR	SPW	SPL	SPR	Qualification
1	Russia	4	4	0	12	12	1	12.000	325	225	1.444	Semifinals
2	Serbia	4	3	1	9	9	3	3.000	281	225	1.249	Semifinals
3	Poland	4	1	3	3	5	9	0.556	300	333	0.901	5th–8th semifinals
4	Romania	4	1	3	3	3	9	0.333	236	266	0.887	5th–8th semifinals
5	Belarus	4	1	3	3	3	10	0.300	225	318	0.708	

Date	Time		Score		Set 1	Set 2	Set 3	Set 4	Set 5	Total	Report
1 Oct	17:30	Belarus	0–3	Romania	12–25	20–25	7–25			39–75	Report
1 Oct	20:00	Russia	3–1	Poland	23–25	25–21	25–21	25–16		98–83	Report
2 Oct	17:30	Poland	0–3	Serbia	14–25	21–25	14–25			49–75	Report
2 Oct	20:00	Russia	3–0	Belarus	25–11	25–10	25–16			75–37	Report
3 Oct	17:30	Serbia	3–0	Romania	25–16	25–20	25–17			75–53	Report
3 Oct	20:00	Belarus	3–1	Poland	25–20	28–26	23–25	25–22		101–93	Report
5 Oct	17:30	Poland	3–0	Romania	25–23	25–19	25–17			75–59	Report
5 Oct	20:00	Russia	3–0	Serbia	25–22	25–11	25–23			75–56	Report
6 Oct	17:30	Serbia	3–0	Belarus	25–18	25–16	25–14			75–48	Report
6 Oct	20:00	Romania	0–3	Russia	7–25	25–27	17–25			49–77	Report

== 5th–8th classification ==
Semifinals
8 October
Slovenia	2
Romania	3
8 October
Poland	3
Slovakia	1

5th place match
9 October
Romania	3
Poland	2
7th place match
9 October
Slovenia	3
Slovakia	1

=== 5th–8th semifinals ===
Date	Time		Score		Set 1	Set 2	Set 3	Set 4	Set 5	Total	Report
8 Oct	11:30	Slovenia	2–3	Romania	25–17	23–25	21–25	25–14	9–15	103–96	Report
8 Oct	14:00	Poland	3–1	Slovakia	23–25	25–23	25–20	25–20		98–88	Report

=== 7th place match ===
Date	Time		Score		Set 1	Set 2	Set 3	Set 4	Set 5	Total	Report
9 Oct	11:30	Slovenia	3–1	Slovakia	25–18	25–19	19–25	25–18		94–80	Report

=== 5th place match ===
Date	Time		Score		Set 1	Set 2	Set 3	Set 4	Set 5	Total	Report
9 Oct	14:00	Romania	3–2	Poland	21–25	25–20	25–21	22–25	15–10	108–101	Report

== Final round ==
Semifinals
8 October
Turkey	3
Serbia	1
8 October
Russia	3
Italy	0

Final
9 October
Turkey	1
Russia	3
3rd place match
9 October
Serbia	3
Italy	1

=== Semifinals ===
Date	Time		Score		Set 1	Set 2	Set 3	Set 4	Set 5	Total	Report
8 Oct	16:30	Turkey	3–1	Serbia	18–25	25–21	26–24	25–20		94–90	Report
8 Oct	19:00	Russia	3–0	Italy	25–17	25–22	25–16			75–55	Report

=== 3rd place match ===
Date	Time		Score		Set 1	Set 2	Set 3	Set 4	Set 5	Total	Report
9 Oct	16:30	Serbia	3–1	Italy	22–25	25–16	25–18	25–20		97–79	Report

=== Final ===
Date	Time		Score		Set 1	Set 2	Set 3	Set 4	Set 5	Total	Report
9 Oct	19:00	Turkey	1–3	Russia	25–20	16–25	12–25	23–25		76–95	Report

== Final standing ==
Rank	Team
1st place, gold medalist(s)	Russia
2nd place, silver medalist(s)	Turkey
3rd place, bronze medalist(s)	Serbia
4	Italy
5	Romania
6	Poland
7	Slovenia
8	Slovakia
9	Belarus
10	Bulgaria
11	Montenegro

Qualified for the 2021 Girls' U18 World Championship

2020 Girls' U17 European champions

Russia
5th title

12–woman roster
Natalia Suvorova, Victoria Demidova, Irina Artiukhina, Daria Zamanskaia, Alina Popova, Arina Fedorovtseva, Oksana Shvydkaia, Viktoriia Kobzar, Dinara Sabitova, Veronika Dumrauf, Anna Khabibrakhmanova, Anastasiia Zhabrova
Head coach
Alexander Karikov

== Awards ==
At the conclusion of the tournament, the following players were selected as the tournament dream team.

- Most valuable player
  (Russia) Arina Fedorovtseva
- Best setter
  (Turkey) Özge Arslanalp
- Best outside spikers
  (Russia) Arina Fedorovtseva
  (Turkey) Melisa Ege Bükmen
- Best middle blockers
  (Russia) Natalia Suvorova
  (Serbia) Hena Kurtagić
- Best opposite spiker
  (Turkey) Pelin Eroktay
- Best libero
  (Italy) Emma Barbero
