= Russia women's national under-19 volleyball team =

Youth volleyball team representing Russia

Russia U19
- Association: Volleyball Federation of Russia

Uniforms
Home	Away	Third

FIVB U19 World Championship
- Appearances: 11 (First in 1993)
- Best result: (gold) Champions (1993, 2021)

Europe U18 / U17 Championship
- Appearances: 12 (First in 1995)
- Best result: (gold) Champions (1997, 2015, 2017, 2018, 2020)
- www.volley.ru (in Russian)

The Russia women's national under-19 volleyball team represents Russia in international women's volleyball competitions and friendly matches under the age of 19 and is ruled by the Russian Volleyball Federation that is a member of The Federation of International Volleyball FIVB and is also a part of the European Volleyball Confederation CEV.

In response to the 2022 Russian invasion of Ukraine, the International Volleyball Federation suspended all Russian national teams, clubs, and officials, as well as beach and snow volleyball athletes, from all events till December 2025. The European Volleyball Confederation (CEV) also banned all Russian national teams, clubs, and officials from participating in European competition, and suspended all members of Russia from their respective functions in CEV organs.

== Results ==
=== FIVB U19 World Championship ===
Champions Runners up Third place Fourth place

FIVB U19 World Championship
Year	Round	Position	Pld	W	L	SW	SL	Squad
(Brazil) 1989	See Soviet Union							
(Portugal) 1991	See Soviet Union							
(Czechoslovakia) 1993		1st place						Squad
(France) 1995		2nd place						Squad
(Thailand) 1997		2nd place						Squad
(Portugal) 1999		9th place						Squad
(Croatia) 2001		6th place						Squad
(Poland) 2003		7th place						Squad
(Macau) 2005		2nd place						Squad
(Mexico) 2007		Third place						Squad
(Thailand) 2009	Didn't qualify							
(Turkey) 2011	Didn't qualify							
(Thailand) 2013	Didn't qualify							
(Peru) 2015		7th place						Squad
(Argentina) 2017		Third place						Squad
(Egypt) 2019		7th place	8	6	2	21	10	Squad
(Mexico) 2021		1st place	8	8	0	24	2	Squad
Total	2 Title	12/17						

=== Europe U18 / U17 Championship ===
Champions Runners up Third place Fourth place

Europe U18 / U17 Championship
Year	Round	Position	Pld	W	L	SW	SL	Squad
(Spain) 1995		2nd place						Squad
(Slovakia) 1997		1st place						Squad
(Poland) 1999		Third place						Squad
(Czech Republic) 2001		5th place						Squad
(Croatia) 2003		4th place						Squad
(Estonia) 2005		2nd place						Squad
(Czech Republic) 2007		5th place						Squad
(Netherlands) 2009		9th place						Squad
(Turkey) 2011	Didn't qualify							
(Montenegro) / (Serbia) 2013		8th place						Squad
(Bulgaria) 2015		1st place						Squad
(Netherlands) 2017		1st place						Squad
(Bulgaria) 2018		1st place						Squad
(Montenegro) 2020		1st place						Squad
(Czech Republic) 2022	Excluded for invading Ukraine							
(Greece) (Romania) 2024	Excluded for invading Ukraine							
(Latvia) (Lithuania) 2026	Excluded for invading Ukraine							
Total	5 Titles	13/17						

== Team ==
=== Previous squad ===
The following was the Russian roster in the 2019 FIVB Girls' U18 World Championship.

Head coach: Svetlana Safronova

No.	Name	Date of birth	Height	Weight	Spike	Block	2019 club
1	Elizaveta Kochurina	1 October 2002	1.89 m (6 ft 2 in)	78 kg (172 lb)	310 cm (120 in)	294 cm (116 in)	(Russia) WVC Dynamo Kazan
2	Valeriia Perova	30 August 2002	1.7 m (5 ft 7 in)	65 kg (143 lb)	275 cm (108 in)	254 cm (100 in)	(Russia) WVC Dynamo Kazan
4	Polina Matveeva	8 August 2002	1.88 m (6 ft 2 in)	69 kg (152 lb)	300 cm (120 in)	281 cm (111 in)	(Russia) WVC Dynamo Kazan
7	Elizaveta Gosheva (c)	23 May 2002	1.82 m (6 ft 0 in)	73 kg (161 lb)	288 cm (113 in)	269 cm (106 in)	(Russia) WVC Dynamo Kazan
8	Vita Akimova	16 July 2002	1.91 m (6 ft 3 in)	71 kg (157 lb)	312 cm (123 in)	301 cm (119 in)	(Russia) WVC Dynamo Kazan
9	Elizaveta Popova	7 June 2002	1.85 m (6 ft 1 in)	63 kg (139 lb)	298 cm (117 in)	291 cm (115 in)	(Russia) WVC Dynamo Kazan
10	Arina Fedorovtseva	19 January 2004	1.9 m (6 ft 3 in)	69 kg (152 lb)	311 cm (122 in)	300 cm (120 in)	(Russia) WVC Dynamo Kazan
11	Alexandra Murushkina	17 February 2002	1.82 m (6 ft 0 in)	65 kg (143 lb)	304 cm (120 in)	286 cm (113 in)	(Russia) WVC Dynamo Kazan
12	Natalia Suvorova	5 March 2004	1.89 m (6 ft 2 in)	65 kg (143 lb)	305 cm (120 in)	300 cm (120 in)	(Russia) Severyanka
15	Valeriia Gorbunova	21 March 2003	1.88 m (6 ft 2 in)	65 kg (143 lb)	305 cm (120 in)	297 cm (117 in)	(Russia) WVC Dynamo Kazan
16	Natalia Slautina	5 August 2002	1.90 m (6 ft 3 in)	78 kg (172 lb)	302 cm (119 in)	286 cm (113 in)	(Russia) WVC Dynamo Kazan
17	Tatiana Kadochkina	21 March 2003	1.92 m (6 ft 4 in)	77 kg (170 lb)	310 cm (120 in)	292 cm (115 in)	(Russia) WVC Dynamo Kazan

== Former squads ==
=== U18 World Championship ===
- 1999 — 12th place
  Kira Ostroumova, Maria Zhadan, Tatyana Aleinikova, Ekaterina Kalashnikova, Nelly Alisheva, Anastasia Yartseva, Ekaterina Karalyus, Natalia Kulikova, Elena Lisovskaya, Nadezhda Gokhshtein, Natalya Rogacheva and Olga Zhitova
- 2001 — 6th place
  Irina Sukhova, Iuliia Morozova, Marina Pilipenko, Olga Fateeva, Marina Babeshina, Olesya Sharavskaya, Oksana Soluyancheva, Natalia Korobkova, Svetlana Surtseva, Ekaterina Margatskaya, Zhanna Demina and Oksana Semenova
- 2003 — 7th place
  Tatiana Soldatova, Maria Borodakova, Ekaterina Osickhina, Ekaterina Gromova, Vera Ulyakina, Anna Klimakova, Anastasia Prisyagina, Ekaterina Ulanova, Anna Ovinnikova, Anastasia Markova, Anna Sotnikova and Tamara Guzeeva
- 2005 — Silver medal
  Elena Samoylova, Irina Kuznetsova, Elena Kovalenko, Elena Boyarkina, Tatiana Kosheleva, Natalia Dianskaya, Irina Gunbina, Natalia Nazarova, Alexandra Vinogradova, Viktoria Rusakova, Ekaterina Pankova and Yuliya Podskalnaya
- 2007 — Bronze medal
  Olga Efimova, Ekaterina Bogacheva, Ekaterina Pankova, Daria Pilipenko, Ksenia Kravchenko, Anna Kiseleva, Ksenia Bondar, Anastasia Shchurinova, Irina Smirnova, Tatiana Shchukina, Viktoria Chervova and Evgeniya Kondrashkina
- 2015 — 7th place
  Angelina Lazarenko, Ksenia Smirnova, Inna Balyko, Anastasia Stalnaya, Elizaveta Kotova, Maria Bogomolova, Ksenia Pligunova, Angelina Emelina, Daria Ryseva, Asiiat Shakhmirova, Maria Vorobyeva and Alexandra Oganezova
- 2017 — Bronze medal
  Varvara Shepeleva, Tatiana Kadochkina, Alexandra Borisova, Polina Shemanova, Viktoriia Pushina, Olga Zvereva, Veronika Rasputnaia, Yulia Brovkina, Irina Soboleva, Valeriya Shevchuk (c), Angelina Nikashova and Oxana Yakushina
- 2019 — 7th place
  Elizaveta Kochurina, Valeriia Perova, Polina Matveeva, Elizaveta Gosheva (c), Vita Akimova, Elizaveta Popova, Arina Fedorovtseva, Alexandra Murushkina, Natalia Suvorova, Valeriia Gorbunova, Natalia Slautina and Tatiana Kadochkina
