= Belarus women's national under-19 volleyball team =

Belarus U18
- Association: Volleyball Federation Of The Rep. Of Belarus (BVF)
- Confederation: CEV

Uniforms
Home	Away	Third

FIVB U19 World Championship
- Appearances: 5 (First in 2001)
- Best result: 9th place : (2005, 2017)

Europe U18 / U17 Championship
- Appearances: 7 (First in 1997)
- Best result: (bronze) Bronze : (2001, 2017)
- Official website

The Belarus women's national under-18 volleyball team represents Belarus in international women's volleyball competitions and friendly matches under the age 18 and it is ruled and managed by the Volleyball Federation Of The Rep. Of Belarus (BVF) That is an affiliate of Federation of International Volleyball FIVB and also a part of European Volleyball Confederation CEV. In light of the 2022 Russian invasion of Ukraine, the European Volleyball Confederation (CEV) banned all Belarusian national teams, clubs, and officials from participating in European competition, and suspended all members of Belarus from their respective functions in CEV organs.

== Results ==
=== Summer Youth Olympics ===
Champions Runners up Third place Fourth place

Youth Olympic Games
Year	Round	Position	Pld	W	L	SW	SL	Squad
(Singapore) 2010	Didn't qualify							
(China) 2014	No Volleyball Event							
(Argentina) 2018	No Volleyball Event							
Total	0 Titles	0/1						

=== FIVB U19 World Championship ===
Champions Runners up Third place Fourth place

FIVB U19 World Championship
Year	Round	Position	Pld	W	L	SW	SL	Squad
(Brazil) 1989	See Soviet Union							
(Portugal) 1991	See Soviet Union							
(Czechoslovakia) 1993	Didn't qualify							
(France) 1995	Didn't qualify							
(Thailand) 1997	Didn't qualify							
(Portugal) 1999	Didn't qualify							
(Croatia) 2001		13th place						Squad
(Poland) 2003		13th place						Squad
(Macau) 2005		9th place						Squad
(Mexico) 2007	Didn't qualify							
(Thailand) 2009	Didn't qualify							
(Turkey) 2011	Didn't qualify							
(Thailand) 2013	Didn't qualify							
(Peru) 2015	Didn't qualify							
(Argentina) 2017		9th place						Squad
(Egypt) 2019		17th place						Squad
(Mexico) 2021	Didn't qualify							
Total	0 Titles	5/17						

=== Europe U18 / U17 Championship ===
Champions Runners up Third place Fourth place

Europe U18 / U17 Championship
Year	Round	Position	Pld	W	L	SW	SL	Squad
(Spain) 1995	Didn't qualify							
(Slovakia) 1997		6th place						Squad
(Poland) 1999	Didn't qualify							
(Czech Republic) 2001		Third place						Squad
(Croatia) 2003		8th place						Squad
(Estonia) 2005		6th place						Squad
(Czech Republic) 2007	Didn't qualify							
(Netherlands) 2009	Didn't qualify							
(Turkey) 2011	Didn't qualify							
(Montenegro) / (Serbia) 2013	Didn't qualify							
(Bulgaria) 2015	Didn't qualify							
(Netherlands) 2017		Third place						Squad
(Bulgaria) 2018		6th place						Squad
(Montenegro) 2020		9th place						Squad
(Czech Republic) 2022	Disqualify							
Total	0 Titles	7/15						

== Team ==
=== Previous squad ===
The following is the Belarusian roster in the 2019 FIVB Girls' U18 World Championship.

Head coach: Dzmitry Kot

No.	Name	Date of birth	Height	Weight	Spike	Block	2019 club
1	Palina Shletsar	1 July 2002	1.72 m (5 ft 8 in)	64 kg (141 lb)	270 cm (110 in)	257 cm (101 in)	(Belarus) RGUOR MINSK
2	Yuliya Hrynevich	9 August 2002	1.75 m (5 ft 9 in)	62 kg (137 lb)	268 cm (106 in)	255 cm (100 in)	(Belarus) RGUOR MINSK
5	Kseniya Liabiodkina (c)	18 February 2002	1.82 m (6 ft 0 in)	70 kg (150 lb)	287 cm (113 in)	277 cm (109 in)	(Belarus) Minchanka-2 MINSK
6	Darya Burak	12 September 2002	1.88 m (6 ft 2 in)	72 kg (159 lb)	291 cm (115 in)	284 cm (112 in)	(Belarus) Zhemchuzhina Polessia MOZYR
7	Hanna Karabinovich	15 April 2003	1.84 m (6 ft 0 in)	65 kg (143 lb)	301 cm (119 in)	288 cm (113 in)	(Belarus) Zhemchuzhina Polessia MOZYR
9	Darya Sauchuk	13 July 2002	1.8 m (5 ft 11 in)	67 kg (148 lb)	274 cm (108 in)	265 cm (104 in)	(Belarus) Pribuzhie BREST
10	Anastasiya Shahun	1 November 2002	1.8 m (5 ft 11 in)	61 kg (134 lb)	286 cm (113 in)	273 cm (107 in)	(Belarus) Minchanka-2 MINSK
11	Lizaveta Bahayeva	3 September 2003	1.71 m (5 ft 7 in)	57 kg (126 lb)	267 cm (105 in)	256 cm (101 in)	(Belarus) Minchanka-2 MINSK
12	Darya Borys	12 March 2003	1.8 m (5 ft 11 in)	68 kg (150 lb)	278 cm (109 in)	270 cm (110 in)	(Belarus) Minchanka-2 MINSK
13	Viktoryia Kastsiuchyk	10 April 2002	1.78 m (5 ft 10 in)	67 kg (148 lb)	275 cm (108 in)	250 cm (98 in)	(Belarus) Kommunalnik-GrGU GRODNO
14	Darya Vakulka	7 June 2002	1.87 m (6 ft 2 in)	62 kg (137 lb)	287 cm (113 in)	276 cm (109 in)	(Belarus) Minchanka-2 MINSK
15	Emilia Mikanovich	24 November 2003	1.8 m (5 ft 11 in)	62 kg (137 lb)	279 cm (110 in)	268 cm (106 in)	(Belarus) Minchanka-2 MINSK

== See also ==
- Belarus women's national volleyball team
- Belarus women's national under-21 volleyball team
