= VC Dynamo-Yantar Kaliningrad =

Russian volleyball club

Dinamo-Yantar
- Full name: Volleyball Club Dinamo-Yantar Kaliningrad
- Founded: 2002
- Dissolved: 2011
- Ground: Dynamo Sports Palace, Moscow, Russia (Capacity: 5,000)
- Chairman: Mikhail Chekin
- Website: Club home page

Uniforms
Home	Away

Dinamo-Yantar (Russian: Дина́мо-Янта́рь), formerly Dinamo (Moscow Oblast) or Dinamo (Moscow region) was a Russian women's volleyball club de jure based in Kaliningrad (de facto in Moscow), who played in the Super League, the top Russian league from 2003–04 until 2010–11.

== Previous names ==
- Dinamo Moscow Oblast (2002–2006)
- Dinamo-Yantar Kaliningrad (2006–2011)

== History ==
The club was established in 2002 as Dinamo Moscow Oblast by the Dynamo Sports Club, the FSB and volleyball club Uralochka as an attempt to revive women's volleyball in the Moscow region, where it was originally based. The team was part of the Dynamo Sports Club with players being provided by Uralochka which at the time had up to three teams competing in the Russian leagues and was the dominant Russian force in women's volleyball. Olga Fateeva was the first of these players, who came for the club's first season in 2002–03 at the second division. The club gained promotion by finishing second place in that season.

The club's second season of existence (2003–04), marked its debut in the Super League, the country's highest league. For that season, young but experienced players such as Irina Tebenikhina, Marina Sheshenina, Elena Sennikova, Yelena Plotnikova, Natalia Vdovina and Yekaterina Gamova came from the Uralochka teams. That made the club very competitive, finishing the Super League as runners-up.

The club had a disappointing season in 2004–05 when it finished sixth place. The following season (2005–06) results were better and the club finish third.

In 2006, following a proposition between the Volleyball Federation of Russia and the Government of Kaliningrad, it was decided to relocate the team to Kaliningrad under the name Dinamo-Yantar Kaliningrad, but the club continued to play its home matches at Moscow's Dynamo Sports Palace in the 2006–07, 2007–08, 2008–09, 2009–10 seasons. During that time the club's results were also not enough to compete for the titles, with the best finish coming as a 6th place in the 2006–07 season. By the time the club folded in May 2011, after a 12th place finish in the 2010–11 season, it had played a total of two matches in Kaliningrad (both in the 2007–08 season).

The club also participated in European competitions without success. It played the CEV Cup (now called CEV Challenge Cup) twice (in 2004–05 and 2006–07) and the Top Teams Cup (now called CEV Cup) twice (in 2004–05 and 2005–06).

== Team squad ==
This was the club's last squad, from season 2010–2011.

Number	Player	Position	Height (m)	Birth date
1	(Russia) Nelly Alisheva	Outside hitter	2.04	20 December 1983 (age 41)
2	(Russia) Sac Hadezhda	Middle blocker	1.93	22 November 1982 (age 42)
3	(Russia) Anastasia Konovalova	Middle blocker	1.87	10 February 1990 (age 35)
4	(Russia) Irina Sukhova	Opposite	1.90	30 July 1984 (age 41)
5	(Russia) Ekaterina Orlova	Outside hitter	1.93	21 October 1987 (age 38)
7	(Russia) Anna Larina	Libero	1.68	4 January 1989 (age 36)
8	(Russia) Daria Belokorovkina	Setter	1.80	27 January 1987 (age 38)
9	(Russia) Natalia Nazarova	Outside hitter	1.88	22 January 1988 (age 37)
10	(Russia) Ksenia Domnidi	Libero	1.75	25 August 1991 (age 34)
11	(Russia) Olga Ryzhova	Middle blocker	1.85	20 May 1984 (age 41)
12	(Serbia) Biljana Simanić	Outside hitter	1.86	18 February 1985 (age 40)
15	(Russia) Svetlana Sourtseva	Setter	1.78	10 April 1984 (age 41)
