= Italy women's national under-19 volleyball team =

Volleyball Team

Italy U19
- Association: FIPAV
- Confederation: CEV

Uniforms
Home	Away	Third

FIVB U19 World Championship
- Appearances: 12 (First in 1995)
- Best result: (gold) Champions : (2015, 2017)

Europe U18 / U17 Championship
- Appearances: 13 (First in 1995)
- Best result: (gold) Champions : (1995, 2001, 2022)
Honours
Representing ITA
FIVB U18 World Championship
Gold medal – first place	2015 Peru
Gold medal – first place	2017 Argentina
Silver medal – second place	2003 Poland
Bronze medal – third place	1995 France
Bronze medal – third place	1997 Thailand
Bronze medal – third place	2005 Macau
European Youth Games
Gold medal – first place	1991 Belgium
Gold medal – first place	2005 Italy
Gold medal – first place	2011 Turkey
Gold medal – first place	2017 Hungary
Silver medal – second place	1997 Portugal
Silver medal – second place	2001 Spain
Bronze medal – third place	1999 Denmark
Bronze medal – third place	2015 Georgia
Europe U18 / U17 Championship
Gold medal – first place	1995 Spain
Gold medal – first place	2001 Czech
Gold medal – first place	2022 Czech
Silver medal – second place	2003 Croatia
Silver medal – second place	2011 Turkey
Silver medal – second place	2013 Serbia & Montenegro
Silver medal – second place	2017 Netherlands
Bronze medal – third place	2005 Estonia
Bronze medal – third place	2007 Czech
Bronze medal – third place	2009 Netherlands

The Italy women's national under-18 volleyball team represents Italy in international women's volleyball competitions and friendly matches under the age 18 and it is ruled by the Italian Volleyball Federation That is an affiliate of Federation of International Volleyball FIVB and also a part of European Volleyball Confederation CEV.

== Results ==
=== Summer Youth Olympics ===
Champions Runners up Third place Fourth place

Youth Olympic Games
Year	Round	Position	Pld	W	L	SW	SL	Squad
(Singapore) 2010	Didn't Qualify							
(China) 2014	No Volleyball Event							
(Argentina) 2018	No Volleyball Event							
Total	0 Titles	0/2						

=== FIVB U19 World Championship ===
Champions Runners up Third place Fourth place

FIVB U19 World Championship
Year	Round	Position	Pld	W	L	SW	SL	Squad
(Brazil) 1989	Didn't Qualify							
(Portugal) 1991	Didn't Qualify							
(Czechoslovakia) 1993	Didn't Qualify							
(France) 1995		Third place						Squad
(Thailand) 1997		Third place						Squad
(Portugal) 1999		7th place						Squad
(Croatia) 2001		4th place						Squad
(Poland) 2003		2nd place						Squad
(Macau) 2005		Third place						Squad
(Mexico) 2007		12th place						Squad
(Thailand) 2009		8th place						Squad
(Turkey) 2011		11th place						Squad
(Thailand) 2013		10th place						Squad
(Peru) 2015		1st place						Squad
(Argentina) 2017		1st place						Squad
(Egypt) 2019		2nd place						Squad
(Mexico) 2021		2nd place						Squad
Total	2 Titles	14/17						

=== Europe U18 / U17 Championship ===
Champions Runners up Third place Fourth place

Europe U18 / U17 Championship
Year	Round	Position	Pld	W	L	SW	SL	Squad
(Spain) 1995		1st place						Squad
(Slovakia) 1997		5th place						Squad
(Poland) 1999		4th place						Squad
(Czech Republic) 2001		1st place						Squad
(Croatia) 2003		2nd place						Squad
(Estonia) 2005		Third place						Squad
(Czech Republic) 2007		Third place						Squad
(Netherlands) 2009		Third place						Squad
(Turkey) 2011		2nd place						Squad
(Montenegro) / (Serbia) 2013		2nd place						Squad
(Bulgaria) 2015		5th place						Squad
(Netherlands) 2017		2nd place						Squad
(Bulgaria) 2018		2nd place						Squad
(Montenegro) 2020		4th place						Squad
Total	2 Titles	14/14						

== Team ==
=== Current squad ===
The following is the Italian roster in the 2017 FIVB Girls' U18 World Championship.

Head coach: Marco Mencarelli

No.	Name	Date of birth	Height	Weight	Spike	Block	2017 club
1	Terry Enweonwu	12 May 2000	1.87 m (6 ft 2 in)	86 kg (190 lb)	339 cm (133 in)	309 cm (122 in)	(Italy) Club Italia
2	Valeria Battista	23 January 2001	1.84 m (6 ft 0 in)	64 kg (141 lb)	316 cm (124 in)	300 cm (120 in)	(Italy) Foppapedretti Bergamo
5	Marina Lubian	11 April 2000	1.87 m (6 ft 2 in)	67 kg (148 lb)	304 cm (120 in)	288 cm (113 in)	(Italy) Club Italia
6	Sarah Fahr	12 September 2001	1.91 m (6 ft 3 in)	81 kg (179 lb)	314 cm (124 in)	302 cm (119 in)	(Italy) Agil Volley Novara
9	Fatime Kone	25 October 2000	1.84 m (6 ft 0 in)	73 kg (161 lb)	310 cm (120 in)	298 cm (117 in)	(Italy) Lilliput Settimo T.se
12	Elena Pietrini	17 March 2000	1.88 m (6 ft 2 in)	66 kg (146 lb)	315 cm (124 in)	305 cm (120 in)	(Italy) Volleyro' Roma
13	Alessia Populini (C)	10 September 2000	1.81 m (5 ft 11 in)	65 kg (143 lb)	304 cm (120 in)	296 cm (117 in)	(Italy) Agil Volley Novara
14	Sara Panetoni	6 May 2000	1.75 m (5 ft 9 in)	59 kg (130 lb)	294 cm (116 in)	288 cm (113 in)	(Italy) Robur Costa Ravenna
16	Francesca Scola	15 September 2001	1.76 m (5 ft 9 in)	70 kg (150 lb)	292 cm (115 in)	286 cm (113 in)	(Italy) Volleyrò Roma
17	Alice Tanase	25 May 2000	1.78 m (5 ft 10 in)	71 kg (157 lb)	302 cm (119 in)	296 cm (117 in)	(Italy) Volleyrò Roma
18	Rachele Morello	7 November 2000	1.82 m (6 ft 0 in)	77 kg (170 lb)	302 cm (119 in)	296 cm (117 in)	(Italy) Club Italia
21	Virginia Peruzzo	7 November 2000	1.78 m (5 ft 10 in)	81 kg (179 lb)	296 cm (117 in)	288 cm (113 in)	(Italy) UYBA Busto Arsizio
