= Nelly Alisheva =

Russian volleyball player (born 1983)

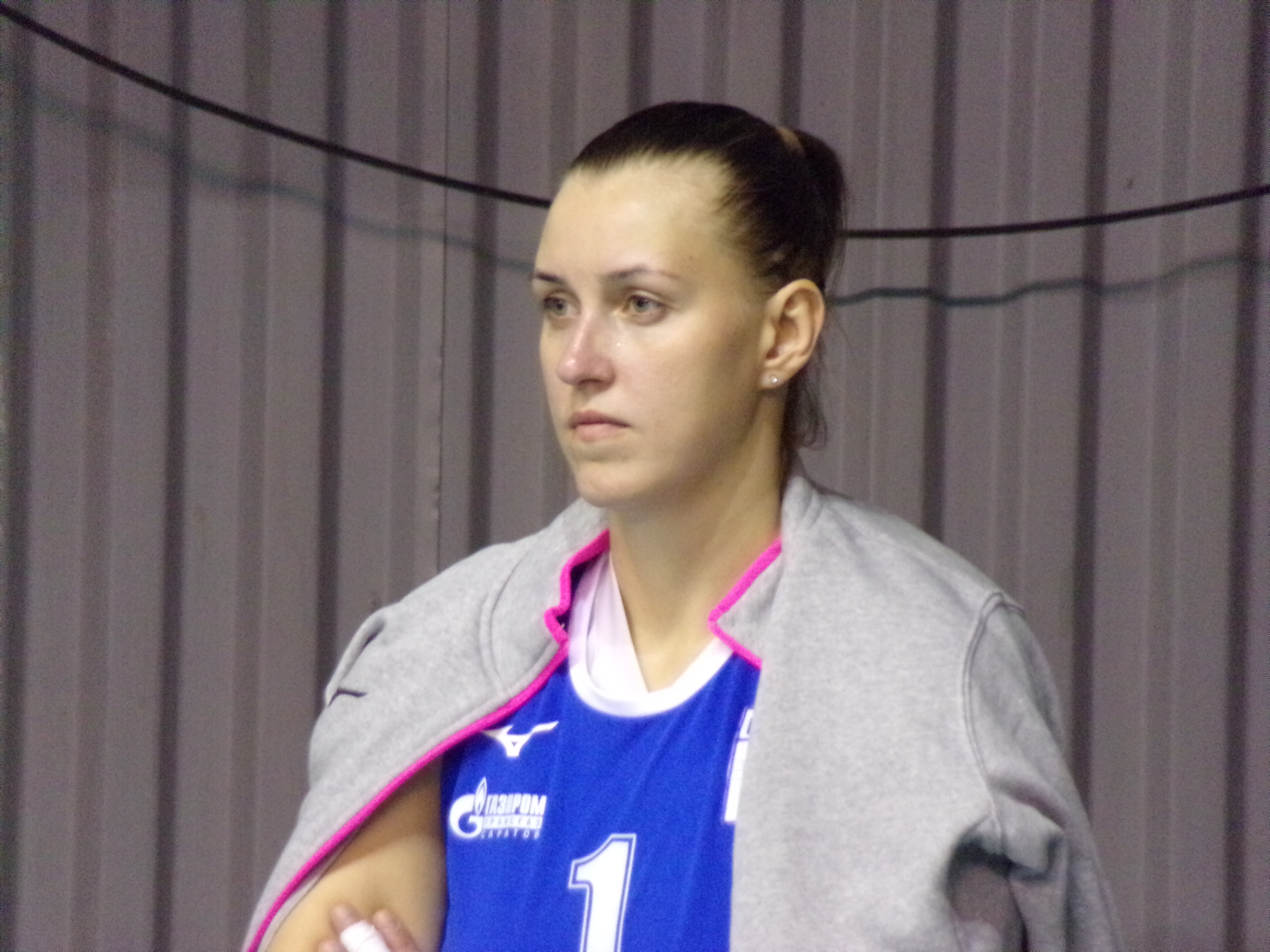

Personal information
- Full name: Nelly Mikhailovna Morozova
- Nationality: Russian
- Born: Nelly Mikhailovna Fonova; 20 December 1983 (age 42); Lipetsk, Russian SFSR
- Height: 2.04 m (6 ft 8 in)

Nelly Mikhailovna Morozova (Russian: Нелли Морозова; née Fonova, Russian: Фонова; previously Alisheva, Russian: Алишева; born 20 December 1983 in Lipetsk) is a retired Russian volleyball player, who last played for VK Proton. She is 2.04 m (6 ft 8 in) tall and played as an opposite.

== Career ==
She started her career at MGFSO. Afterwards, she played for Dinamo-Yantar from 2003 to 2011, then Omitchka Omsk from 2011 to 2013, before settling in at VK Proton.

== Personal life ==
Alisheva has a daughter named Vasilisa, born in June 2002. Vasilisa is also a volleyball player.
