= Bulgaria women's national under-19 volleyball team =

Youth volleyball team representing Bulgaria

Bulgaria U19
- Association: Bulgarian Volleyball Federation
- Confederation: CEV

Uniforms
Home	Away	Third

FIVB U19 World Championship
- Appearances: 6 (First in 1989)
- Best result: (gold) Champions : (2025)

Europe U18 / U17 Championship
- Appearances: 7 (First in 1995)
- Best result: (gold) Champions : (2024)

The Bulgaria women's national under-19 volleyball team represents Bulgaria in international women's volleyball competitions and friendly matches under the age 19 and it is ruled by the Bulgarian Volleyball Federation, an affiliate of Federation of International Volleyball FIVB and also a part of European Volleyball Confederation CEV.

== Results ==
=== FIVB U19 World Championship ===
Champions Runners up Third place Fourth place

FIVB U19 World Championship
Year	Round	Position	Pld	W	L	SW	SL	Squad
(Brazil) 1989		5th place						Squad
(Portugal) 1991		6th place						Squad
(Czechoslovakia) 1993	Didn't Qualify							
(France) 1995	Didn't Qualify							
(Thailand) 1997	Didn't Qualify							
(Portugal) 1999	Didn't Qualify							
(Croatia) 2001	Didn't Qualify							
(Poland) 2003	Didn't Qualify							
(Macau) 2005	Didn't Qualify							
(Mexico) 2007	Didn't Qualify							
(Thailand) 2009	Didn't Qualify							
(Turkey) 2011	Didn't Qualify							
(Thailand) 2013	Didn't Qualify							
(Peru) 2015	Didn't Qualify							
(Argentina) 2017	Didn't Qualify							
(Egypt) 2019		11th place						squad
(Mexico) 2021		17th place						squad
(Croatia) (Hungary) 2023		8th place						squad
(Croatia) (Serbia) 2025		1st place						squad
Total	1 Titles	6/19						

=== Europe U18 / U17 Championship ===
Champions Runners up Third place Fourth place

Europe U18 / U17 Championship
Year	Round	Position	Pld	W	L	SW	SL	Squad
(Spain) 1995		7th place						Squad
(Slovakia) 1997	Didn't Qualify							
(Poland) 1999	Didn't Qualify							
(Czech Republic) 2001	Didn't Qualify							
(Croatia) 2003	Didn't Qualify							
(Estonia) 2005	Didn't Qualify							
(Czech Republic) 2007	Didn't Qualify							
(Netherlands) 2009	Didn't Qualify							
(Turkey) 2011	Didn't Qualify							
(Montenegro) / (Serbia) 2013	Didn't Qualify							
(Bulgaria) 2015		11th place						Squad
(Netherlands) 2017		10th place						Squad
(Bulgaria) 2018		4th place						Squad
(Montenegro) 2020		10th place						Squad
(Czech Republic) 2022		6th place						Squad
(Greece) (Romania) 2024		1st place						Squad
Total	1 Titles	7/16						

== Team ==
=== Current squad ===
The following is the Bulgarian roster in the 2015 Girls' Youth European Volleyball Championship.

Head Coach: (Bulgaria) Radoslav Bakardzhiev

No.	Name	Date of birth	Height	Weight	Spike	Block	Position
1	Ani Bozdeva	30 January 1999	1.86 m (6 ft 1 in)	61 kg (134 lb)	300 cm (120 in)	285 cm (112 in)	Outside-spiker
3	Radostina Marinova	2 October 1998	1.84 m (6 ft 0 in)	65 kg (143 lb)	303 cm (119 in)	290 cm (110 in)	Middle-blocker
4	Kathryn Dimitrova	27 November 1999	1.90 m (6 ft 3 in)	73 kg (161 lb)	303 cm (119 in)	296 cm (117 in)	Opposite
5	Aleksandra Milanova	4 July 2001	1.80 m (5 ft 11 in)	74 kg (163 lb)	295 cm (116 in)	282 cm (111 in)	Outside-spiker
6	Zlatena Salabasheva	19 June 1998	1.69 m (5 ft 7 in)	57 kg (126 lb)	265 cm (104 in)	280 cm (110 in)	Libero
7	Monika Krasteva	9 May 1999	1.82 m (6 ft 0 in)	64 kg (141 lb)	298 cm (117 in)	284 cm (112 in)	Outside-spiker
10	Polina Neykova	7 October 1998	1.83 m (6 ft 0 in)	73 kg (161 lb)	290 cm (110 in)	281 cm (111 in)	Setter
11	Vasilena Papanova	2 February 1999	1.78 m (5 ft 10 in)	65 kg (143 lb)	290 cm (110 in)	285 cm (112 in)	Setter
13	Madlen Rasheva	1 March 1998	1.83 m (6 ft 0 in)	67 kg (148 lb)	300 cm (120 in)	288 cm (113 in)	Opposite
14	Diana Kazakova	31 July 1998	1.80 m (5 ft 11 in)	70 kg (150 lb)	280 cm (110 in)	268 cm (106 in)	Outside-spiker
16	Yoanna Atanasova	29 January 1998	1.86 m (6 ft 1 in)	73 kg (161 lb)	290 cm (110 in)	280 cm (110 in)	Middle-blocker
20	Simona Minkova	7 June 2000	1.83 m (6 ft 0 in)	74 kg (163 lb)	285 cm (112 in)	273 cm (107 in)	Middle-blocker

== See also ==
- Bulgaria women's team
- Bulgaria women's U18 team
- Bulgaria women's U20 team
- Bulgaria women's U23 team
- Bulgaria men's team
