= Julia Ituma =

Italian volleyball player (2004–2023)

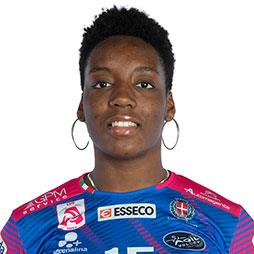

Personal information
- Nationality: Italian
- Born: 8 October 2004; Milan, Italy
- Died: 13 April 2023 (aged 18); Istanbul, Turkey
- Hometown: , Italy
- Height: 1.92 m (6 ft 4 in)

Volleyball information
- Position: Diagonal attack/ Opposite hitter

Julia Ituma (8 October 2004 – 13 April 2023) was an Italian volleyball player who played for AGIL Volley.

== Life and career ==
Born in Milan from Nigerian parents, Ituma played three seasons in A2 volleyball league before making her debut in Serie A1 in 2022 with Igor Volley Novara. Often compared to Paola Egonu, in 2022 she won the Gold Medal at the European Youth Summer Olympic Festival and the Women's Junior European Volleyball Championship with the Italian national team, scoring 21 points in the final.

Ituma committed suicide on 13 April 2023, aged 18, by jumping from a window on the sixth floor of a hotel in Istanbul, where her club was staying for a Champions League semi-final match.
