= Volleyball at the 2019 European Youth Summer Olympic Festival – Boys tournament =

Boys volleyball at the 2019 European Youth Summer Olympic Festival
- Venue: Darnagul Arena; MES Sport and Health Center
- Date: 22–27 July
- Competitors: 96 from 8 nations

Medalists
| gold medal | Italy |
| silver medal | Belgium |
| bronze medal | Russia |

The boys tournament in volleyball at the 2019 European Youth Summer Olympic Festival was held from 22 to 27 July at the Darnagul Arena and the MES Sport and Health Center in Baku, Azerbaijan.

== Competition schedule ==
| P | Preliminary round | ½ | Semi-finals | B | Bronze medal match | F | Gold medal match |

| Mon 22 | Tue 23 | Wed 24 | Fri 26 | Sat 27 | |
|---|---|---|---|---|---|
| P | | | ½ | B | F |

== Participating teams ==
- Azerbaijan (host)
- Belgium
- Belarus
- Bulgaria
- Czech Republic
- Germany
- Italy
- Russia

== Pool composition ==
=== Preliminary round ===
| Pool A | Pool B |
|---|---|
| Azerbaijan | Belgium |
| Belarus | Bulgaria |
| Germany | Czech Republic |
| Russia | Italy |

=== Group A ===
| Pos | Team | Pld | W | L | Pts | SW | SL | SR | SPW | SPL | SPR | Qualification |
|---|---|---|---|---|---|---|---|---|---|---|---|---|
| 1 | Russia | 3 | 3 | 0 | 9 | 9 | 0 | MAX | 225 | 158 | 1.424 | Semifinals |
| 2 | Belarus | 3 | 2 | 1 | 6 | 6 | 4 | 1.500 | 235 | 204 | 1.152 | Semifinals |
| 3 | Germany | 3 | 1 | 2 | 3 | 4 | 6 | 0.667 | 214 | 244 | 0.877 | |
| 4 | Azerbaijan | 3 | 0 | 3 | 0 | 0 | 9 | 0.000 | 163 | 231 | 0.706 | |

| Date | Time | | Score | | Set 1 | Set 2 | Set 3 | Set 4 | Set 5 | Total | Report |
|---|---|---|---|---|---|---|---|---|---|---|---|
| 22 Jul | 11:30 | Belarus | 0–3 | Russia | 20–25 | 21–25 | 20–25 | | | 61–75 | P2^{[usurped]} P3^{[usurped]} |
| 22 Jul | 16:30 | Azerbaijan | 0–3 | Germany | 29–31 | 19–25 | 22–25 | | | 70–81 | P2^{[usurped]} P3^{[usurped]} |
| 23 Jul | 11:30 | Russia | 3–0 | Germany | 25–13 | 25–20 | 25–15 | | | 75–48 | P2^{[usurped]} P3^{[usurped]} |
| 23 Jul | 16:30 | Belarus | 3–0 | Azerbaijan | 25–9 | 25–19 | 25–16 | | | 75–44 | P2^{[usurped]} P3^{[usurped]} |
| 24 Jul | 11:30 | Germany | 1–3 | Belarus | 26–24 | 21–25 | 19–25 | 19–25 | | 85–99 | P2^{[usurped]} P3^{[usurped]} |
| 24 Jul | 16:30 | Russia | 3–0 | Azerbaijan | 25–15 | 25–11 | 25–23 | | | 75–49 | P2^{[usurped]} P3^{[usurped]} |

=== Group B ===
| Pos | Team | Pld | W | L | Pts | SW | SL | SR | SPW | SPL | SPR | Qualification |
|---|---|---|---|---|---|---|---|---|---|---|---|---|
| 1 | Italy | 3 | 2 | 1 | 7 | 8 | 4 | 2.000 | 286 | 252 | 1.135 | Semifinals |
| 2 | Belgium | 3 | 2 | 1 | 5 | 7 | 6 | 1.167 | 299 | 298 | 1.003 | Semifinals |
| 3 | Bulgaria | 3 | 1 | 2 | 4 | 7 | 8 | 0.875 | 320 | 326 | 0.982 | |
| 4 | Czech Republic | 3 | 1 | 2 | 2 | 4 | 8 | 0.500 | 249 | 278 | 0.896 | |

| Date | Time | | Score | | Set 1 | Set 2 | Set 3 | Set 4 | Set 5 | Total | Report |
|---|---|---|---|---|---|---|---|---|---|---|---|
| 22 Jul | 14:00 | Bulgaria | 3–2 | Italy | 25–23 | 25–21 | 19–25 | 21–25 | 15–11 | 105–105 | P2^{[usurped]} P3^{[usurped]} |
| 22 Jul | 19:00 | Belgium | 3–1 | Czech Republic | 25–23 | 19–25 | 25–22 | 25–16 | | 94–86 | P2^{[usurped]} P3^{[usurped]} |
| 23 Jul | 14:00 | Italy | 3–0 | Czech Republic | 25–18 | 25–11 | 25–20 | | | 75–49 | P2^{[usurped]} P3^{[usurped]} |
| 23 Jul | 19:00 | Bulgaria | 2–3 | Belgium | 22–25 | 25–23 | 25–19 | 22–25 | 12–15 | 106–107 | P2^{[usurped]} P3^{[usurped]} |
| 24 Jul | 14:00 | Czech Republic | 3–2 | Bulgaria | 25–18 | 21–25 | 25–23 | 23–25 | 20–18 | 114–109 | P2^{[usurped]} P3^{[usurped]} |
| 24 Jul | 19:00 | Italy | 3–1 | Belgium | 25–21 | 34–32 | 22–25 | 25–20 | | 106–98 | P2^{[usurped]} P3^{[usurped]} |

== Final round ==
=== Classification bracket ===
Classification 5–8
26 July
Germany | 2
Czech Republic | 3
26 July
Bulgaria | 3
Azerbaijan | 0

Fifth place
27 July
Czech Republic | 3
Bulgaria | 0
Seventh place
27 July
Germany | 3
Azerbaijan | 1

==== Classification 5–8 ====
| Date | Time | | Score | | Set 1 | Set 2 | Set 3 | Set 4 | Set 5 | Total | Report |
|---|---|---|---|---|---|---|---|---|---|---|---|
| 26 Jul | 16:30 | Germany | 2–3 | Czech Republic | 33–31 | 24–26 | 25–22 | 19–25 | 10–15 | 111–119 | P2^{[usurped]} |
| 26 Jul | 19:30 | Bulgaria | 3–0 | Azerbaijan | 25–19 | 25–21 | 25–16 | | | 75–56 | P2^{[usurped]} P3^{[usurped]} |

==== Seventh place game ====
| Date | Time | | Score | | Set 1 | Set 2 | Set 3 | Set 4 | Set 5 | Total | Report |
|---|---|---|---|---|---|---|---|---|---|---|---|
| 27 Jul | 11:30 | Germany | 3–1 | Azerbaijan | 25–22 | 34–32 | 26–28 | 25–20 | | 110–102 | P2^{[usurped]} P3^{[usurped]} |

==== Fifth place game ====
| Date | Time | | Score | | Set 1 | Set 2 | Set 3 | Set 4 | Set 5 | Total | Report |
|---|---|---|---|---|---|---|---|---|---|---|---|
| 27 Jul | 16:30 | Czech Republic | 3–0 | Bulgaria | 25–22 | 25–21 | 25–16 | | | 75–59 | P2^{[usurped]} P3^{[usurped]} |

=== Championship bracket ===
Semi-finals
26 July
Russia | 2
Belgium | 3
26 July
Italy | 3
Belarus | 1

Final
27 July
Belgium | 0
Italy | 3
Third place
27 July
Russia | 3
Belarus | 1

==== Semifinals ====
| Date | Time | | Score | | Set 1 | Set 2 | Set 3 | Set 4 | Set 5 | Total | Report |
|---|---|---|---|---|---|---|---|---|---|---|---|
| 26 Jul | 16:30 | Russia | 2–3 | Belgium | 25–23 | 30–28 | 17–25 | 20–25 | 13–15 | 105–116 | P2^{[usurped]} P3^{[usurped]} |
| 26 Jul | 19:30 | Italy | 3–1 | Belarus | 25–18 | 22–25 | 25–23 | 25–18 | | 97–84 | P2^{[usurped]} P3^{[usurped]} |

==== Third place game ====
| Date | Time | | Score | | Set 1 | Set 2 | Set 3 | Set 4 | Set 5 | Total | Report |
|---|---|---|---|---|---|---|---|---|---|---|---|
| 27 Jul | 14:30 | Russia | 3–1 | Belarus | 21–25 | 25–16 | 25–17 | 28–26 | | 99–84 | P2^{[usurped]} P3^{[usurped]} |

==== Final ====
| Date | Time | | Score | | Set 1 | Set 2 | Set 3 | Set 4 | Set 5 | Total | Report |
|---|---|---|---|---|---|---|---|---|---|---|---|
| 27 Jul | 17:00 | Belgium | 0–3 | Italy | 21–25 | 21–25 | 19–25 | | | 61–75 | P2^{[usurped]} P3^{[usurped]} |

== Final standings ==
| Rank | Team |
|---|---|
| 1st place, gold medalist(s) | Italy |
| 2nd place, silver medalist(s) | Belgium |
| 3rd place, bronze medalist(s) | Russia |
| 4 | Belarus |
| 5 | Czech Republic |
| 6 | Bulgaria |
| 7 | Germany |
| 8 | Azerbaijan |
