= Romania women's national under-19 volleyball team =

Romania U19
- Association: Romanian Volleyball Federation
- Confederation: CEV

Uniforms
Home	Away	Third

FIVB U19 World Championship
- Appearances: 3 (First in 1991)
- Best result: 8th place : (1991)

Europe U18 / U17 Championship
- Appearances: 2 (First in 2017)
- Best result: 5th place : (2018)
- Official website

The Romania women's national under-19 volleyball team represents Romania in international women's volleyball competitions and friendly matches under the age of 19 and it is ruled and managed by the Romanian Volleyball Federation is an affiliate of the Federation of International Volleyball FIVB and also a part of European Volleyball Confederation CEV.

== Results ==
=== Summer Youth Olympics ===
Champions Runners up Third place Fourth place

Youth Olympic Games
Year	Round	Position	Pld	W	L	SW	SL	Squad
(Singapore) 2010	Didn't Qualify							
(China) 2014	No Volleyball Event							
(Argentina) 2018	No Volleyball Event							
Total	0 Titles	0/1						

=== FIVB U19 World Championship ===
Champions Runners up Third place Fourth place

FIVB U19 World Championship
Year	Round	Position	Pld	W	L	SW	SL	Squad
(Brazil) 1989	Didn't Qualify							
(Portugal) 1991		8th place						Squad
(Czechoslovakia) 1993		9th place						Squad
(France) 1995 →	Didn't Qualify							
(Argentina) 2017 ←	Didn't Qualify							
(Egypt) 2019		6th place						Squad
(Mexico) 2021		6th place						Squad
Total	0 Titles	4/17						

=== Europe U18 / U17 Championship ===
Champions Runners up Third place Fourth place

Europe U18 / U17 Championship
Year	Round	Position	Pld	W	L	SW	SL	Squad
(Spain) 1995 →	Didn't Qualify							
(Bulgaria) 2015 ←	Didn't Qualify							
(Netherlands) 2017		9th place						Squad
(Bulgaria) 2018		5th place						Squad
Total	0 Titles	2/13						

== Team ==
=== Current squad ===
The Following players is the Romanian players that Competed in the 2018 Girls' U17 Volleyball European Championship

#	Name	Position	Height	Weight	Birthday	Spike	Block
	airoaie madalina andreea	outside-spiker	176	68	2002	275	260
	alexandru adriana valentina	middle-blocker	183	63	2002	280	270
	alupei francesca ioana	middle-blocker	190	65	2003	290	280
	badut antonia elena	libero	150	45	2002	240	230
	barbulescu patricia carina	libero	170	50	2003	269	260
	barza iulia maria	opposite	178	63	2002	280	270
	boga izabella andreea	middle-blocker	182	74	2002	280	270
	bogdan ioana teodora	middle-blocker	183	53	2002	283	275
	bratu mara teodora	middle-blocker	178	55	2004	280	275
	carutasu alexia ioana	opposite	179	54	2003	290	275
	chescu ilinca alexandra	outside-spiker	172	69	2003	275	260
	cojocaru andra elena	libero	160	54	2002	262	254
	constantin briana-anne-marie	outside-spiker	176	58	2002	275	265
	daniloaia alexandra adriana	setter	179	48	2002	280	270
	dragan stefania beatrice	outside-spiker	175	63	2002	280	265
	dulau maria	outside-spiker	182	63	2002	285	270
	dumitrescu mara	outside-spiker	179	65	2002	293	280
	ghita beatrice diana	middle-blocker	179	58	2002	270	260
	grigore serena andreea	setter	169	58	2002	275	260
	ionescu denisa ioana	middle-blocker	187	60	2002	298	285
	iordache alexandra claudia	middle-blocker	182	70	2002	275	265
	macarie ilinca	libero	170	53	2002	282	274
	marinescu cosmina stefania	setter	172	58	2002	275	265
	matanie iulia	setter	176	64	2003	275	260
	milea diana florentina	opposite	177	65	2003	295	288
	murar andreea cristina	setter	167	52	2002	262	254
	murariu florina isabela	outside-spiker	180	82	2002	283	271
	murariu karina elena	outside-spiker	181	75	2002	278	266
	neamt adelina daniela	outside-spiker	174	57	2002	270	260
	popa georgiana	libero	165	49	2003	275	258
	spatariu alexandra	setter	168	58	2002	270	260
	spinoche alexandra	setter	177	70	2003	280	265
	tesileanu andra maria	middle-blocker	185	60	2002	285	275
	tura cristina maria	opposite	175	55	2003	270	260
