= 2021 FIVB Volleyball Girls' U18 World Championship =

Tournament details
- Host country: Mexico
- City: Durango City
- Dates: 20–29 September 2021
- Teams: 20

Final positions
- Champions: Russia (3rd title)
- Runners-up: Italy
- Third place: United States
- Fourth place: Serbia

Tournament awards
- MVP: (Russia) Natalia Suvorova
- Best Setter: (Russia) Viktoriia Kobzar
- Best OH: (Italy) Julia Ituma (United States) Mckenna Wucherer
- Best MB: (Russia) Natalia Suvorova (Serbia) Hena Kurtagić
- Best OPP: (Italy) Giulia Viscioni
- Best Libero: (Italy) Emma Barbero

The 2021 FIVB Volleyball Girls' U18 World Championship was the 17th edition of the FIVB Volleyball Girls' U18 World Championship, contested by the women's national teams under the age of 18 of the members of the Fédération Internationale de Volleyball (FIVB), the sport's global governing body. The final tournament was held in Durango City, Mexico. Mexico were chosen as the hosts for this event for the second time after previously hosting the 2007 tournament.

United States were the defending champions, but lost in the semifinals to Italy.

== Qualification ==
A total of 20 teams qualified for the final tournament. In addition to Mexico who qualified automatically as hosts, the other 19 teams qualified from five separate continental competitions, which were held by 31 December 2020 at the latest. However, due to the ongoing global COVID-19 pandemic and subsequent impact on some Confederations’ ability to organise the events within the given deadline, the FIVB has decided to postpone the deadline for continental qualifications to 28 February 2021. Additionally, in the case of no Continental Confederations being able to hold qualifying event, teams qualified according to the respective Continental Rankings.

Means of qualification	Date	Venue	Vacancies	Qualifier
Host country	2020	(Switzerland) Lausanne	1	Mexico
2020 European Championship	1–9 October 2020	(Montenegro) Podgorica	6	Russia Turkey Serbia Italy Romania Poland
NORCECA Ranking			4	United States Canada Puerto Rico Dominican Republic
2018 Asian Championship	20–27 May	(Thailand) Nakhon Pathom	1	~~Japan~~ ~~China~~ Thailand ~~South Korea~~
2020 African Championship	March 2021	(Nigeria) Abuja	2	Cameroon Nigeria
South American Ranking			3	Brazil Peru Argentina
FIVB World Ranking			3	Egypt* Bulgaria* Slovakia*
Total				20

* Japan, China, and South Korea withdrew from the competition. Bulgaria, Egypt and Slovakia entered by the world ranking.

== Pools composition ==
Pool A	Pool B	Pool C	Pool D
Mexico (22), (Host)	Italy (1)	United States (2)	Brazil (3)
Cameroon (9)	Turkey (8)	Romania (6)	Russia (4)
Serbia (12)	Peru (10)	Nigeria (11)	Bulgaria (13)
Canada (17)	Egypt (14)	Thailand (18)	Argentina (15)
Poland (20)	Dominican Republic (52)	Puerto Rico (20)	Slovakia (24)

== Pool standing procedure ==
1. Number of matches won
2. Match points
3. Sets ratio
4. Points ratio
5. If the tie continues as per the point ratio between two teams, the priority will be given to the team which won the last match between them. When the tie in points ratio is between three or more teams, a new classification of these teams in the terms of points 1, 2 and 3 will be made taking into consideration only the matches in which they were opposed to each other.

Match won 3–0 or 3–1: 3 match points for the winner, 0 match points for the loser
Match won 3–2: 2 match points for the winner, 1 match point for the loser

== Preliminary round ==
=== Pool A ===
Pos	Team	Pld	W	L	Pts	SW	SL	SR	SPW	SPL	SPR	Qualification
1	Serbia	4	4	0	11	12	2	6.000	335	178	1.882	Round of 16
2	Poland	4	3	1	9	11	5	2.200	337	250	1.348	Round of 16
3	Mexico	4	2	2	7	8	6	1.333	296	229	1.293	Round of 16
4	Canada	4	1	3	3	3	9	0.333	214	225	0.951	Round of 16
5	Cameroon (Note: Cameroon was forced to withdraw team did not come to competition and their games were forfeited.)	4	0	4	0	0	12	0.000	0	300	0.000	17th–20th places

Notes:

Date	Time		Score		Set 1	Set 2	Set 3	Set 4	Set 5	Total	Report
20 Sep	17:00	Serbia	3–2	Poland	22–25	25–10	23–25	25–14	15–6	110–80	P2Report
20 Sep	20:00	Mexico	3–0	Cameroon	25–0	25–0	25–0			75–0	Report
21 Sep	17:00	Serbia	3–0	Cameroon	25–0	25–0	25–0			75–0	Report
21 Sep	20:00	Mexico	3–0	Canada	25–18	25–7	25–22			75–47	P2Report
22 Sep	17:00	Poland	3–0	Cameroon	25–0	25–0	25–0			75–0	Report
22 Sep	20:00	Canada	0–3	Serbia	11–25	10–25	22–25			43–75	P2Report
23 Sep	17:00	Cameroon	0–3	Canada	0–25	0–25	0–25			0–75	Report
23 Sep	20:00	Mexico	2–3	Poland	25–21	16–25	25–21	12–25	13–15	91–107	P2Report
24 Sep	17:00	Poland	3–0	Canada	25–18	25–18	25–13			75–49	P2Report
24 Sep	20:00	Mexico	0–3	Serbia	14–25	23–25	18–25			55–75	P2Report

=== Pool B ===
Pos	Team	Pld	W	L	Pts	SW	SL	SR	SPW	SPL	SPR	Qualification
1	Italy	4	4	0	12	12	1	12.000	322	248	1.298	Round of 16
2	Turkey	4	3	1	8	9	5	1.800	320	261	1.226	Round of 16
3	Dominican Republic	4	2	2	6	6	8	0.750	303	324	0.935	Round of 16
4	Peru	4	1	3	3	4	10	0.400	293	332	0.883	Round of 16
5	Egypt	4	0	4	1	5	12	0.417	323	396	0.816	17th–20th places

Date	Time		Score		Set 1	Set 2	Set 3	Set 4	Set 5	Total	Report
20 Sep	11:00	Dominican Republic	0–3	Turkey	15–25	21–25	18–25			54–75	P2Report
20 Sep	14:00	Egypt	1–3	Peru	25–20	22–25	20–25	22–25		89–95	P2Report
21 Sep	11:00	Egypt	1–3	Italy	25–22	12–25	10–25	16–25		63–97	P2Report
21 Sep	14:00	Peru	0–3	Turkey	13–25	21–25	10–25			44–75	P2Report
22 Sep	11:00	Peru	1–3	Dominican Republic	25–18	22–25	21–25	23–25		91–93	P2Report
22 Sep	14:00	Turkey	0–3	Italy	22–25	23–25	19–25			64–75	P2Report
23 Sep	11:00	Turkey	3–2	Egypt	25–18	25–10	21–25	20–25	15–10	106–88	P2Report
23 Sep	14:00	Italy	3–0	Dominican Republic	25–18	25–21	25–19			75–58	P2Report
24 Sep	11:00	Italy	3–0	Peru	25–21	25–23	25–19			75–63	P2Report
24 Sep	14:00	Dominican Republic	3–1	Egypt	23–25	25–22	25–23	25–13		98–83	P2Report

=== Pool C ===
Pos	Team	Pld	W	L	Pts	SW	SL	SR	SPW	SPL	SPR	Qualification
1	United States	4	4	0	12	12	1	12.000	318	167	1.904	Round of 16
2	Romania	4	3	1	8	10	5	2.000	333	246	1.354	Round of 16
3	Thailand	4	2	2	7	8	6	1.333	305	248	1.230	Round of 16
4	Puerto Rico	4	1	3	3	3	9	0.333	230	225	1.022	Round of 16
5	Nigeria (Note: Nigeria was forced to withdraw team did not come to competition and their games were forfeited.)	4	0	4	0	0	12	0.000	0	300	0.000	17th–20th places

Notes:

Date	Time		Score		Set 1	Set 2	Set 3	Set 4	Set 5	Total	Report
20 Sep	11:00	Puerto Rico	0–3	Romania	19–25	19–25	21–25			59–75	P2Report
20 Sep	14:00	Thailand	3–0	Nigeria	25–0	25–0	25–0			75–0	Report
21 Sep	11:00	Thailand	0–3	United States	18–25	20–25	23–25			61–75	P2Report
21 Sep	14:00	Nigeria	0–3	Romania	0–25	0–25	0–25			0–75	Report
22 Sep	11:00	Nigeria	0–3	Puerto Rico	0–25	0–25	0–25			0–75	Report
22 Sep	17:00	Romania	1–3	United States	21–25	11–25	25–18	16–25		73–93	P2Report
23 Sep	14:00	United States	3–0	Puerto Rico	25–9	25–15	25–9			75–33	P2Report
23 Sep	17:00	Romania	3–2	Thailand	25–15	23–25	22–25	25–19	15–10	110–94	P2Report
24 Sep	11:00	United States	3–0	Nigeria	25–0	25–0	25–0			75–0	Report
24 Sep	14:00	Puerto Rico	0–3	Thailand	20–25	23–25	20–25			63–75	P2Report

=== Pool D ===
Pos	Team	Pld	W	L	Pts	SW	SL	SR	SPW	SPL	SPR	Qualification
1	Russia	4	4	0	11	12	2	6.000	325	243	1.337	Round of 16
2	Brazil	4	3	1	10	11	4	2.750	348	292	1.192	Round of 16
3	Slovakia	4	2	2	6	7	8	0.875	328	330	0.994	Round of 16
4	Argentina	4	1	3	3	4	10	0.400	290	320	0.906	Round of 16
5	Bulgaria	4	0	4	0	2	12	0.167	239	345	0.693	17th–20th places

Date	Time		Score		Set 1	Set 2	Set 3	Set 4	Set 5	Total	Report
20 Sep	17:00	Slovakia	0–3	Russia	15–25	19–25	22–25			56–75	P2Report
20 Sep	20:00	Argentina	3–1	Bulgaria	24–26	25–15	25–19	25–14		99–74	P2Report
21 Sep	17:00	Argentina	0–3	Brazil	23–25	22–25	16–25			61–75	P2Report
21 Sep	20:00	Bulgaria	0–3	Russia	9–25	13–25	17–25			39–75	P2Report
22 Sep	17:00	Bulgaria	1–3	Slovakia	17–25	19–25	25–21	14–25		75–96	P2Report
22 Sep	20:00	Russia	3–2	Brazil	25–23	16–25	19–25	25–14	15–12	100–99	P2Report
23 Sep	17:00	Russia	3–0	Argentina	25–12	25–17	25–20			75–49	P2Report
23 Sep	20:00	Brazil	3–1	Slovakia	25–16	25–16	24–26	25–22		99–80	P2Report
24 Sep	17:00	Brazil	3–0	Bulgaria	25–14	25–20	25–17			75–51	P2Report
24 Sep	20:00	Slovakia	3–1	Argentina	21–25	25–23	25–13	25–20		96–81	P2Report

== Final round ==
- All times are Mexico Central Daylight Time (UTC-05:00).

=== 17th–18th places ===
Pos	Team	Pld	W	L	Pts	SW	SL	SR	SPW	SPL	SPR	Result
17	Bulgaria	3	3	0	9	9	0	MAX	226	64	3.531	17th place
18	Egypt	3	2	1	6	6	3	2.000	214	76	2.816	18th place
19	Nigeria	2	0	2	0	0	6	0.000	0	150	0.000	19th place
19	Cameroon	2	0	2	0	0	6	0.000	0	150	0.000	19th place

Date	Time		Score		Set 1	Set 2	Set 3	Set 4	Set 5	Total	Report
27 Sep	10:00	Egypt	0–3	Bulgaria	20–25	20–25	24–26			64–76	P2Report

=== Final sixteen ===
Round of 16
26 Sep
Russia	3
Puerto Rico	0
26 Sep
Poland	3
Dominican Republic	0
26 Sep
Brazil	3
Thailand	1
26 Sep
Serbia	3
Peru	1
26 Sep
Italy	3
Canada	0
26 Sep
Romania	3
Slovakia	2
26 Sep
Turkey	3
Mexico	0
26 Sep
United States	3
Argentina	2

Quarterfinals
27 Sep
Russia	3
Poland	0
27 Sep
Brazil	1
Serbia	3
27 Sep
Italy	3
Romania	0
27 Sep
Turkey	2
United States	3

Semifinals
28 Sep
Russia	3
Serbia	0
28 Sep
Italy	3
United States	0

Final
29 Sep
Russia	3
Italy	0
3rd place match
29 Sep
Serbia	1
United States	3

5th–8th semifinals
28 Sep
Poland	2
Brazil	3
28 Sep
Romania	3
Turkey	1

5th place match
29 Sep
Brazil	3
Romania	0
7th place match
29 Sep
Poland	0
Turkey	3

9th–16th quarterfinals
27 Sep
Puerto Rico	1
Dominican Republic	3
27 Sep
Thailand	3
Peru	0
27 Sep
Canada	1
Slovakia	3
27 Sep
Mexico	1
Argentina	3

9th–12th semifinals
28 Sep
Dominican Republic	3
Thailand	1
28 Sep
Slovakia	2
Argentina	3

9th place match
29 Sep
Dominican Republic	0
Argentina	3
11th place match
29 Sep
Thailand	3
Slovakia	1

13th–15th semifinals
28 Sep
Puerto Rico	1
Peru	3
28 Sep
Canada	0
Mexico	3

13th place match
29 Sep
Peru	0
Mexico	3
15th place match
29 Sep
Puerto Rico	3
Canada	0

==== Round of 16 ====
Date	Time		Score		Set 1	Set 2	Set 3	Set 4	Set 5	Total	Report
26 Sep	11:00	Russia	3–0	Puerto Rico	25–12	25–11	25–13			75–36	P2Report
26 Sep	11:00	Poland	3–0	Dominican Republic	25–19	25–11	25–16			75–46	P2Report
26 Sep	14:00	Brazil	3–1	Thailand	25–19	25–23	24–26	25–23		99–91	P2Report
26 Sep	14:00	Serbia	3–1	Peru	25–13	25–21	17–25	25–15		92–74	P2Report
26 Sep	17:00	Italy	3–0	Canada	25–10	25–10	25–13			75–33	P2Report
26 Sep	17:00	Romania	3–2	Slovakia	21–25	25–22	16–25	25–21	15–11	102–104	P2Report
26 Sep	20:00	Turkey	3–0	Mexico	25–17	25–13	25–17			75–47	P2Report
26 Sep	20:00	United States	3–2	Argentina	26–24	23–25	21–25	25–18	15–7	110–99	P2Report

==== 9th–16th quarterfinals ====
Date	Time		Score		Set 1	Set 2	Set 3	Set 4	Set 5	Total	Report
27 Sep	12:30	Puerto Rico	1–3	Dominican Republic	25–18	13–25	12–25	18–25		68–93	P2Report
27 Sep	15:00	Thailand	3–0	Peru	25–23	25–18	25–17			75–58	P2Report
27 Sep	17:30	Canada	1–3	Slovakia	25–23	22–25	17–25	11–25		75–98	P2Report
27 Sep	20:00	Mexico	1–3	Argentina	25–23	23–25	23–25	15–25		86–98	P2Report

==== Quarterfinals ====
Date	Time		Score		Set 1	Set 2	Set 3	Set 4	Set 5	Total	Report
27 Sep	11:00	Russia	3–0	Poland	25–11	25–12	25–15			75–38	P2Report
27 Sep	14:00	Brazil	1–3	Serbia	23–25	20–25	25–22	20–25		88–97	P2Report
27 Sep	17:00	Italy	3–0	Romania	25–15	25–18	25–13			75–46	P2Report
27 Sep	20:00	Turkey	2–3	United States	25–19	23–25	25–22	21–25	9–15	103–106	P2Report

==== 13th–16th semifinals ====
Date	Time		Score		Set 1	Set 2	Set 3	Set 4	Set 5	Total	Report
28 Sep	11:00	Puerto Rico	1–3	Peru	17–25	27–25	21–25	26–28		91–103	P2Report
28 Sep	14:00	Canada	0–3	Mexico	20–25	26–28	16–25			62–78	P2Report

==== 9th–12th semifinals ====
Date	Time		Score		Set 1	Set 2	Set 3	Set 4	Set 5	Total	Report
28 Sep	17:00	Dominican Republic	3–1	Thailand	25–16	25–18	24–26	25–20		99–80	P2Report
28 Sep	20:00	Slovakia	2–3	Argentina	25–16	21–25	25–23	19–25	5–15	95–104	P2Report

==== 5th–8th semifinals ====
Date	Time		Score		Set 1	Set 2	Set 3	Set 4	Set 5	Total	Report
28 Sep	11:00	Poland	2–3	Brazil	17–25	25–22	22–25	25–19	11–15	100–106	P2Report
28 Sep	14:00	Romania	3–1	Turkey	25–20	23–25	25–18	25–19		98–82	P2Report

==== Semifinals ====
Date	Time		Score		Set 1	Set 2	Set 3	Set 4	Set 5	Total	Report
28 Sep	17:00	Russia	3–0	Serbia	25–13	25–8	25–21			75–42	P2Report
28 Sep	20:00	Italy	3–0	United States	25–23	25–18	25–22			75–63	P2Report

==== 15th place match ====
Date	Time		Score		Set 1	Set 2	Set 3	Set 4	Set 5	Total	Report
29 Sep	10:00	Puerto Rico	3–0	Canada	25–21	28–26	25–23			78–70	P2Report

==== 13th place match ====
Date	Time		Score		Set 1	Set 2	Set 3	Set 4	Set 5	Total	Report
29 Sep	13:00	Peru	0–3	Mexico	18–25	16–25	14–25			48–75	P2Report

==== 11th place match ====
Date	Time		Score		Set 1	Set 2	Set 3	Set 4	Set 5	Total	Report
29 Sep	16:00	Thailand	3–1	Slovakia	22–25	25–22	25–19	25–23		97–89	P2Report

==== 9th place match ====
Date	Time		Score		Set 1	Set 2	Set 3	Set 4	Set 5	Total	Report
29 Sep	19:00	Dominican Republic	0–3	Argentina	20–25	17–25	18–25			55–75	P2Report

==== 7th place match ====
Date	Time		Score		Set 1	Set 2	Set 3	Set 4	Set 5	Total	Report
29 Sep	11:00	Poland	0–3	Turkey	21–25	17–25	25–27			63–77	P2Report

==== 5th place match ====
Date	Time		Score		Set 1	Set 2	Set 3	Set 4	Set 5	Total	Report
29 Sep	14:00	Brazil	3–0	Romania	25–17	25–14	25–12			75–43	P2Report

==== 3rd place match ====
Date	Time		Score		Set 1	Set 2	Set 3	Set 4	Set 5	Total	Report
29 Sep	17:00	Serbia	1–3	United States	23–25	18–25	28–26	18–25		87–101	P2Report

==== Final ====
Date	Time		Score		Set 1	Set 2	Set 3	Set 4	Set 5	Total	Report
29 Sep	20:00	Russia	3–0	Italy	25–16	25–17	25–20			75–53	P2Report

== Final standings ==
Rank	Team
1st place, gold medalist(s)	Russia
2nd place, silver medalist(s)	Italy
3rd place, bronze medalist(s)	United States
4	Serbia
5	Brazil
6	Romania
7	Turkey
8	Poland
9	Argentina
10	Dominican Republic
11	Thailand
12	Slovakia
13	Mexico
14	Peru
15	Puerto Rico
16	Canada
17	Bulgaria
18	Egypt
19	Nigeria
19	Cameroon

2021 FIVB Volleyball Girls' U18 World champions

Russia
Third title

12–women roster
Natalia Suvorova, Anastasiia Kapralova, Victoria Demidova, Irina Artiukhina, Daria Zamanskaia, Alina Rubtsova, Alina Popova, Oksana Shvydkaia, Viktoriia Kobzar, Anna Khabibrakhmanova, Anastasiia Zhabrova, Varvara Sergeeva
Head coach
Alexander Karikov

== Awards ==
- Most valuable player
  (Russia) Natalia Suvorova
- Best setter
  (Russia) Viktoriia Kobzar
- Best outside spikers
  (Italy) Julia Ituma
  (United States) Mckenna Wucherer
- Best middle blockers
  (Russia) Natalia Suvorova
  (Serbia) Hena Kurtagić
- Best opposite spiker
  (Italy) Giulia Viscioni
- Best libero
  (Italy) Emma Barbero

== See also ==
- 2021 FIVB Volleyball Boys' U19 World Championship
