= 2019 FIVB Volleyball Girls' U18 World Championship =

ًبطولة العالم للكرة الطائرة للفتيات تحت 18 عاما 2019 مصر
- Official logo

Tournament details
- Host country: Egypt
- Dates: 5–14 September
- Teams: 20
- Venues: 2 (in 2 host cities)

Final positions
- Champions: United States (1st title)
- Runners-up: Italy
- Third place: Brazil
- Fourth place: China

Tournament awards
- MVP: (United States) Jessica Mruzik
- Best Setter: (United States) Kennedi Orr
- Best OH: (Brazil) Ana Cristina de Souza (Italy) Oghosasere Omoruyi
- Best MB: (United States) Devyn Robinson (Italy) Emma Graziani
- Best OPP: (Italy) Giorgia Frosini
- Best Libero: (China) Zhu Xingchen

The 2019 FIVB Volleyball Girls' U18 World Championship is the sixteenth edition of the FIVB Volleyball Girls' U18 World Championship, contested by the women's national teams under the age of 18 of the members of the Fédération Internationale de Volleyball (FIVB), the sport's global governing body. The final tournament was held in Egypt from 5 to 14 September 2019. Egypt were chosen as the hosts for this event for the first time.

The finals involve 20 teams, of which 19 came through qualifying competitions, while the host nation qualified automatically. Of the 20 teams, 13 had also appeared in the previous tournament in 2017, while Cameroon and DR Congo made their first appearances at a FIVB Volleyball Girls' U18 World Championship.

The United States won the first title, after defeated Italy 3–2 in final.

== Qualification ==
A total of 20 teams qualify for the final tournament. In addition to Egypt who qualified automatically as hosts, the other 19 teams qualify from five separate continental competitions.

Means of qualification	Date	Venue	Vacancies	Qualifier
Host country	2018	(Switzerland) Lausanne	1	Egypt
2018 European Championship	13–21 April 2018	(Bulgaria) Sofia	6	Russia Italy Turkey Bulgaria Romania Belarus
2018 Asian Championship	20–27 May	(Thailand) Nakhon Pathom	4	Japan China Thailand South Korea
2018 South American Championship	8–12 July 2018	(Colombia) Valledupar	3	Argentina Peru Brazil
2018 African Youth Games	18–23 July 2018	(Algeria) Algiers	2	Cameroon^{1} DR Congo^{1}
2018 NORCECA Championship	25 Aug–2 Sep 2018	(Honduras) Tegucigalpa	2	United States Canada
2019 Pan-American Cup for NORCECA	21–26 May 2019	(Mexico) Durango City	2	Puerto Rico Mexico
Total				20

1.Teams that will make their debut.

== Draw ==
Teams were seeded in the first two positions of each pool following the Serpentine system according to their FIVB World Ranking as of 1 January 2019. FIVB reserved the right to seed the hosts as heads of pool A regardless of the World Ranking. All teams not seeded were drawn to take other available positions in the remaining lines following the World Ranking. Each pool had no more than three teams from the same confederation. The draw was held in Cairo, Egypt on 1 July 2019. Rankings as of 1 January 2019 are shown in brackets, except the hosts Egypt who ranked 14th.

Seeded teams		Pot 1	Pot 2	Pot 3
Egypt (Host); Italy (1); Russia (2); Turkey (4)	Japan (5); Argentina (6); United States (7); Brazil (9)	Peru (10); South Korea (11); Belarus (12); China (13)	Thailand (14); Canada (18); Cameroon (18); DR Congo (20)	Bulgaria (21); Romania (25); Mexico (35); Puerto Rico (66)

=== Pools composition ===
Pool A	Pool B	Pool C	Pool D
Egypt	Italy	Russia	Turkey
Brazil	United States	Argentina	Japan
China	South Korea	Belarus	Peru
Cameroon	Canada	Thailand	DR Congo
Puerto Rico	Mexico	Romania	Bulgaria

== Venues ==
Pool A, B and Final round	Pool C, D and Final round
Ismailia, Egypt	Cairo, Egypt
Suez Canal Authority Indoor Halls Complex	Cairo Stadium Indoor Halls Complex
Capacity: 11,000	Capacity: 20,000

== Pool standing procedure ==
1. Number of matches won
2. Match points
3. Sets ratio
4. Points ratio
5. If the tie continues as per the point ratio between two teams, the priority will be given to the team which won the last match between them. When the tie in points ratio is between three or more teams, a new classification of these teams in the terms of points 1, 2 and 3 will be made taking into consideration only the matches in which they were opposed to each other.

Match won 3–0 or 3–1: 3 match points for the winner, 0 match points for the loser
Match won 3–2: 2 match points for the winner, 1 match point for the loser

== Preliminary round ==
- All times are Egypt Standard Time (UTC+02:00).

=== Pool A ===
Pos	Team	Pld	W	L	Pts	SW	SL	SR	SPW	SPL	SPR	Qualification
1	China	4	4	0	12	12	0	MAX	300	194	1.546	Round of 16
2	Brazil	4	3	1	9	9	3	3.000	277	225	1.231	Round of 16
3	Egypt	4	2	2	6	6	8	0.750	312	315	0.990	Round of 16
4	Puerto Rico	4	1	3	2	4	11	0.364	303	343	0.883	Round of 16
5	Cameroon	4	0	4	1	3	12	0.250	246	361	0.681	17th–20th round robin

Date	Time		Score		Set 1	Set 2	Set 3	Set 4	Set 5	Total	Report
5 Sep	15:00	China	3–0	Cameroon	25–14	25–16	25–12			75–42	Report
5 Sep	20:00	Egypt	3–1	Puerto Rico	26–24	20–25	30–28	25–21		101–98	Report
6 Sep	17:30	Puerto Rico	0–3	Brazil	12–25	20–25	13–25			45–75	Report
6 Sep	20:00	Cameroon	1–3	Egypt	14–25	11–25	30–28	11–25		66–103	Report
7 Sep	17:30	Brazil	3–0	Cameroon	25–14	25–20	25–12			75–46	Report
7 Sep	20:00	Egypt	0–3	China	17–25	20–25	12–25			49–75	Report
8 Sep	17:30	China	3–0	Brazil	25–13	25–15	25–23			75–51	Report
8 Sep	20:00	Cameroon	2–3	Puerto Rico	25–19	26–24	11–25	21–25	9–15	92–108	Report
9 Sep	17:30	Puerto Rico	0–3	China	16–25	18–25	18–25			52–75	Report
9 Sep	20:00	Brazil	3–0	Egypt	26–24	25–16	25–19			76–59	Report

=== Pool B ===
Pos	Team	Pld	W	L	Pts	SW	SL	SR	SPW	SPL	SPR	Qualification
1	Italy	4	4	0	10	12	4	3.000	364	300	1.213	Round of 16
2	United States	4	3	1	10	11	3	3.667	333	244	1.365	Round of 16
3	Canada	4	2	2	5	6	9	0.667	281	334	0.841	Round of 16
4	South Korea	4	1	3	3	4	10	0.400	278	333	0.835	Round of 16
5	Mexico	4	0	4	2	5	12	0.417	338	383	0.883	17th–20th round robin

Date	Time		Score		Set 1	Set 2	Set 3	Set 4	Set 5	Total	Report
5 Sep	10:00	South Korea	1–3	Canada	25–19	23–25	20–25	22–25		90–94	Report
5 Sep	12:30	United States	3–0	Mexico	25–21	25–21	25–16			75–58	Report
6 Sep	10:00	Italy	3–2	United States	20–25	21–25	25–22	25–23	15–13	106–108	Report
6 Sep	12:30	South Korea	3–1	Mexico	23–25	25–22	25–19	25–23		98–89	Report
7 Sep	10:00	Canada	3–2	Mexico	15–25	22–25	25–18	25–15	15–11	102–94	Report
7 Sep	12:30	Italy	3–0	South Korea	25–15	25–14	25–20			75–49	Report
8 Sep	10:00	United States	3–0	South Korea	25–11	25–17	25–13			75–41	Report
8 Sep	12:30	Italy	3–0	Canada	25–20	25–7	25–19			75–46	Report
9 Sep	10:00	Italy	3–2	Mexico	25–15	21–25	22–25	25–20	15–12	108–97	Report
9 Sep	12:30	United States	3–0	Canada	25–10	25–13	25–16			75–39	Report

=== Pool C ===
Pos	Team	Pld	W	L	Pts	SW	SL	SR	SPW	SPL	SPR	Qualification
1	Russia	4	4	0	11	12	3	4.000	358	264	1.356	Round of 16
2	Romania	4	2	2	7	9	7	1.286	348	349	0.997	Round of 16
3	Argentina	4	2	2	5	6	8	0.750	288	294	0.980	Round of 16
4	Thailand	4	1	3	4	6	10	0.600	333	363	0.917	Round of 16
5	Belarus	4	1	3	3	6	11	0.545	325	382	0.851	17th–20th round robin

Date	Time		Score		Set 1	Set 2	Set 3	Set 4	Set 5	Total	Report
5 Sep	15:00	Belarus	3–2	Thailand	19–25	28–26	20–25	25–22	15–11	107–109	Report
5 Sep	20:30	Argentina	0–3	Romania	17–25	21–25	23–25			61–75	Report
6 Sep	17:30	Russia	3–0	Argentina	25–19	25–17	25–16			75–52	Report
6 Sep	20:00	Belarus	1–3	Romania	25–23	10–25	21–25	22–25		78–98	Report
7 Sep	17:30	Russia	3–0	Belarus	25–17	25–14	25–15			75–46	Report
7 Sep	20:00	Thailand	3–1	Romania	27–25	22–25	25–17	25–17		99–84	Report
8 Sep	17:30	Argentina	3–2	Belarus	23–25	25–18	25–16	12–25	15–10	100–94	Report
8 Sep	20:00	Russia	3–1	Thailand	22–25	25–23	25–9	25–18		97–75	Report
9 Sep	17:30	Argentina	3–0	Thailand	25–13	25–22	25–15			75–50	Report
9 Sep	20:00	Russia	3–2	Romania	25–7	24–26	22–25	25–20	15–13	111–91	Report

=== Pool D ===
Pos	Team	Pld	W	L	Pts	SW	SL	SR	SPW	SPL	SPR	Qualification
1	Japan	4	4	0	11	12	4	3.000	386	297	1.300	Round of 16
2	Peru	4	2	2	7	9	6	1.500	348	306	1.137	Round of 16
3	Turkey	4	2	2	7	8	7	1.143	320	302	1.060	Round of 16
4	Bulgaria	4	2	2	5	8	8	1.000	341	348	0.980	Round of 16
5	DR Congo	4	0	4	0	0	12	0.000	158	300	0.527	17th–20th round robin

Date	Time		Score		Set 1	Set 2	Set 3	Set 4	Set 5	Total	Report
5 Sep	10:00	Peru	2–3	Bulgaria	23–25	25–17	25–23	19–25	17–19	109–109	Report
5 Sep	12:30	Japan	3–0	DR Congo	25–11	25–15	25–9			75–35	Report
6 Sep	10:00	Turkey	2–3	Japan	25–23	28–26	12–25	23–25	9–15	97–114	Report
6 Sep	12:30	Peru	3–0	DR Congo	25–21	25–14	25–10			75–45	Report
7 Sep	10:00	Bulgaria	3–0	DR Congo	25–17	25–17	25–12			75–46	Report
7 Sep	12:30	Turkey	0–3	Peru	18–25	16–25	16–25			50–75	Report
8 Sep	10:00	Japan	3–1	Peru	25–22	28–26	24–26	25–15		102–89	Report
8 Sep	12:30	Turkey	3–1	Bulgaria	25–20	25–23	23–25	25–13		98–81	Report
9 Sep	10:00	Turkey	3–0	DR Congo	25–9	25–9	25–14			75–32	Report
9 Sep	12:30	Japan	3–1	Bulgaria	25–20	25–23	20–25	25–8		95–76	Report

== Final round ==
=== 17th–20th places ===
Pos	Team	Pld	W	L	Pts	SW	SL	SR	SPW	SPL	SPR
1	Belarus	3	3	0	9	9	1	9.000	251	174	1.443
2	Mexico	3	2	1	6	7	3	2.333	248	191	1.298
3	Cameroon	3	1	2	3	3	6	0.500	160	218	0.734
4	DR Congo	3	0	3	0	0	9	0.000	151	227	0.665

Date	Time		Score		Set 1	Set 2	Set 3	Set 4	Set 5	Total	Report
10 Sep	10:00	Cameroon	0–3	Mexico	13–25	12–25	20–25			45–75	Report
10 Sep	10:00	Belarus	3–0	DR Congo	25–11	25–7	25–20			75–38	Report
12 Sep	09:00	Cameroon	3–0	DR Congo	27–25	25–20	25–23			77–68	Report
12 Sep	11:00	Mexico	1–3	Belarus	25–27	25–22	25–27	23–25		98–101	Report
13 Sep	09:00	Mexico	3–0	DR Congo	25–8	25–17	25–20			75–45	Report
13 Sep	11:00	Cameroon	0–3	Belarus	8–25	18–25	12–25			38–75	Report

=== Final sixteen ===
Round of 16
10 September
Brazil	3
Canada	0
10 September
Russia	3
Bulgaria	1
10 September
United States	3
Egypt	0
10 September
Japan	3
Thailand	0
10 September
China	3
South Korea	0
10 September
Romania	3
Turkey	0
10 September
Italy	3
Puerto Rico	0
10 September
Peru	3
Argentina	1

Quarterfinals
12 September
Brazil	3
Russia	2
12 September
United States	3
Japan	1
12 September
China	3
Romania	0
12 September
Italy	3
Peru	0

Semifinals
13 September
Brazil	0
United States	3
13 September
China	2
Italy	3

Final
14 September
United States	3
Italy	2
3rd place match
14 September
Brazil	3
China	1

==== Round of 16 ====
Date	Time		Score		Set 1	Set 2	Set 3	Set 4	Set 5	Total	Report
10 Sep	12:30	Italy	3–0	Puerto Rico	25–12	25–18	25–21			75–51	Report
10 Sep	12:30	Peru	3–1	Argentina	16–25	25–15	25–22	26–24		92–86	Report
10 Sep	15:00	Japan	3–0	Thailand	25–19	25–18	25–19			75–56	Report
10 Sep	15:00	China	3–0	South Korea	27–25	27–25	26–24			80–74	Report
10 Sep	17:30	Brazil	3–0	Canada	25–21	25–18	25–19			75–58	Report
10 Sep	17:30	Russia	3–1	Bulgaria	25–17	25–20	15–25	25–16		90–78	Report
10 Sep	20:00	United States	3–0	Egypt	25–13	27–25	25–17			77–55	Report
10 Sep	20:00	Romania	3–0	Turkey	25–18	25–16	25–20			75–54	Report

==== Quarterfinals ====
Date	Time		Score		Set 1	Set 2	Set 3	Set 4	Set 5	Total	Report
12 Sep	12:30	China	3–0	Romania	25–17	30–28	25–19			80–64	Report
12 Sep	15:00	Brazil	3–2	Russia	21–25	17–25	25–19	25–17	15–9	103–95	Report
12 Sep	17:30	United States	3–1	Japan	17–25	25–13	25–19	25–20		92–77	Report
12 Sep	20:00	Italy	3–0	Peru	25–19	25–10	25–18			75–47	Report

==== Semifinals ====
Date	Time		Score		Set 1	Set 2	Set 3	Set 4	Set 5	Total	Report
13 Sep	17:30	Brazil	0–3	United States	18–25	18–25	14–25			50–75	Report
13 Sep	20:00	China	2–3	Italy	25–22	25–19	19–25	19–25	10–15	98–106	Report

==== 3rd place match ====
Date	Time		Score		Set 1	Set 2	Set 3	Set 4	Set 5	Total	Report
14 Sep	16:00	Brazil	3–1	China	25–18	25–18	22–25	27–25		99–86	Report

==== Final ====
Date	Time		Score		Set 1	Set 2	Set 3	Set 4	Set 5	Total	Report
14 Sep	19:00	United States	3–2	Italy	25–17	19–25	25–18	22–25	15–10	106–95	Report

=== 5th–8th places ===
5th–8th semifinals
13 September
Russia	1
Japan	3
13 September
Romania	3
Peru	0

5th place match
14 September
Japan	3
Romania	0
7th place match
14 September
Russia	3
Peru	0

==== 5th–8th semifinals ====
Date	Time		Score		Set 1	Set 2	Set 3	Set 4	Set 5	Total	Report
13 Sep	12:30	Russia	1–3	Japan	25–27	25–23	17–25	23–25		90–100	Report
13 Sep	15:00	Romania	3–0	Peru	25–20	25–21	25–17			75–58	Report

==== 7th place match ====
Date	Time		Score		Set 1	Set 2	Set 3	Set 4	Set 5	Total	Report
14 Sep	11:00	Russia	3–0	Peru	25–12	25–16	25–15			75–43	Report

==== 5th place match ====
Date	Time		Score		Set 1	Set 2	Set 3	Set 4	Set 5	Total	Report
14 Sep	13:30	Japan	3–0	Romania	25–23	25–23	25–15			75–61	Report

=== 9th–16th places ===
9th–16th quarterfinals
12 September
Canada	1
Bulgaria	3
12 September
Egypt	3
Thailand	2
12 September
South Korea	1
Turkey	3
12 September
Puerto Rico	1
Argentina	3

9th–12th semifinals
13 September
Bulgaria	1
Egypt	3
13 September
Turkey	3
Argentina	2

9th place match
14 September
Egypt	0
Turkey	3
11th place match
14 September
Bulgaria	3
Argentina	0

13th–16th semifinals
13 September
Canada	3
Thailand	2
13 September
South Korea	3
Puerto Rico	1

13th place match
14 September
Canada	2
South Korea	3
15th place match
14 September
Thailand	3
Puerto Rico	1

==== 9th–16th quarterfinals ====
Date	Time		Score		Set 1	Set 2	Set 3	Set 4	Set 5	Total	Report
12 Sep	13:00	South Korea	1–3	Turkey	25–22	17–25	14–25	11–25		67–97	Report
12 Sep	15:30	Canada	1–3	Bulgaria	17–25	26–24	16–25	23–25		82–99	Report
12 Sep	18:00	Puerto Rico	1–3	Argentina	10–25	17–25	25–22	15–25		67–97	Report
12 Sep	20:30	Egypt	3–2	Thailand	25–21	25–23	17–25	22–25	18–16	107–110	Report

==== 13th–16th semifinals ====
Date	Time		Score		Set 1	Set 2	Set 3	Set 4	Set 5	Total	Report
13 Sep	13:00	Canada	3–2	Thailand	9–25	25–23	25–22	20–25	15–10	94–105	Report
13 Sep	15:30	South Korea	3–1	Puerto Rico	25–15	21–25	25–16	26–24		97–80	Report

==== 9th–12th semifinals ====
Date	Time		Score		Set 1	Set 2	Set 3	Set 4	Set 5	Total	Report
13 Sep	18:00	Turkey	3–2	Argentina	15–25	22–25	25–19	25–21	15–12	102–102	Report
13 Sep	20:30	Bulgaria	1–3	Egypt	23–25	25–21	15–25	20–25		83–96	Report

==== 15th place match ====
Date	Time		Score		Set 1	Set 2	Set 3	Set 4	Set 5	Total	Report
14 Sep	10:00	Thailand	3–1	Puerto Rico	20–25	25–20	26–24	25–22		96–91	Report

==== 13th place match ====
Date	Time		Score		Set 1	Set 2	Set 3	Set 4	Set 5	Total	Report
14 Sep	12:00	Canada	2–3	South Korea	25–11	25–21	21–25	22–25	10–15	103–97	Report

==== 11th place match ====
Date	Time		Score		Set 1	Set 2	Set 3	Set 4	Set 5	Total	Report
14 Sep	14:00	Bulgaria	3–0	Argentina	26–24	25–17	25–13			76–54	Report

==== 9th place match ====
Date	Time		Score		Set 1	Set 2	Set 3	Set 4	Set 5	Total	Report
14 Sep	16:00	Egypt	0–3	Turkey	19–25	22–25	18–25			59–75	Report

== Final standing ==
Rank	Team
1st place, gold medalist(s)	United States
2nd place, silver medalist(s)	Italy
3rd place, bronze medalist(s)	Brazil
4	China
5	Japan
6	Romania
7	Russia
8	Peru
9	Turkey
10	Egypt
11	Bulgaria
12	Argentina
13	South Korea
14	Canada
15	Thailand
16	Puerto Rico
17	Belarus
18	Mexico
19	Cameroon
20	DR Congo

2019 Girls' U18 World champions

United States
1st title

12–woman roster

Setters: Kami Miner, Kennedi Orr
Outside Hitters: Elena Oglivie, Lindsay Krause, Jess Mruzik, Emily Londot, Allison Jacobs
Middle Blockers: Caroline Crawford, Devyn Robinson, Carter Booth
Libero: Lexi Rodriguez, Sydney Taylor

Head coach
James Stone

== Awards ==
- Most valuable player
  (United States) Jessica Mruzik
- Best setter
  (United States) Kennedi Orr
- Best outside spikers
  (Brazil) Ana Cristina de Souza
  (Italy) Oghosasere Omoruyi
- Best middle blockers
  (United States) Devyn Robinson
  (Italy) Emma Graziani
- Best opposite spiker:
  (Italy) Giorgia Frosini
- Best libero
  (China) Zhu Xingchen

== See also ==
- 2019 FIVB Volleyball Boys' U19 World Championship
