= 2018 Girls' U17 Volleyball European Championship =

Tournament details
- Host country: Bulgaria
- Dates: 13–21 April
- Teams: 12
- Venues: 2 (in 2 host cities)

Final positions
- Champions: Russia (4th title)

Tournament awards
- MVP: (Russia) Valeriia Gorbunova

The 2018 Girls' Youth European Volleyball Championship was the thirteenth edition of the Girls' Youth European Volleyball Championship, a biennial international volleyball tournament organised by the European Volleyball Confederation (CEV) the girls' under-17 national teams of Europe. The tournament was held in Bulgaria from 13 to 21 April 2018.

A total of twelve teams played in the tournament, with players born on or after 1 January 2001 eligible to participate.

Same as previous editions, the tournament acted as the CEV qualifiers for the FIVB Volleyball Girls' U18 World Championship. The top six teams qualified for the 2019 FIVB Volleyball Girls' U18 World Championship as the CEV representatives.

== Participating teams ==
- Hosts
  - Bulgaria
- Qualified through 2018 Girls' U17 Volleyball European Championship Qualification
  - Belarus
  - Germany
  - Hungary
  - Italy
  - Netherlands
  - Romania
  - Russia
  - Serbia
  - Slovenia
  - Turkey
  - Ukraine

== Pools composition ==
Pool I	Pool II
Bulgaria	Turkey
Russia	Romania
Belarus	Ukraine
Serbia	Italy
Slovenia	Netherlands
Hungary	Germany

== Preliminary round ==
=== Pool I ===
Pos	Team	Pld	W	L	Pts	SW	SL	SR	SPW	SPL	SPR	Qualification
1	Russia	5	4	1	13	14	6	2.333	461	388	1.188	Semifinals
2	Bulgaria	5	4	1	9	13	10	1.300	494	487	1.014	Semifinals
3	Slovenia	5	3	2	9	11	9	1.222	456	443	1.029	5th–8th Semifinals
4	Belarus	5	2	3	7	10	10	1.000	436	438	0.995	5th–8th Semifinals
5	Serbia	5	2	3	6	9	11	0.818	451	469	0.962	
6	Hungary	5	0	5	1	4	15	0.267	380	453	0.839	

Date	Time		Score		Set 1	Set 2	Set 3	Set 4	Set 5	Total	Report
13 Apr	15:00	Belarus	3–1	Serbia	25–21	25–21	21–25	25–17		96–84	Report
13 Apr	17:30	Bulgaria	3–2	Russia	25–18	23–25	25–17	19–25	15–12	107–97	Report
13 Apr	20:00	Hungary	1–3	Slovenia	18–25	20–25	25–22	14–25		77–97	Report
14 Apr	15:00	Russia	3–1	Belarus	21–25	25–16	25–17	25–13		96–71	Report
14 Apr	17:30	Slovenia	1–3	Serbia	28–26	22–25	20–25	20–25		90–101	Report
14 Apr	20:00	Hungary	2–3	Bulgaria	25–18	20–25	31–29	23–25	7–15	106–112	Report
15 Apr	15:00	Serbia	1–3	Russia	18–25	25–22	21–25	21–25		85–97	Report
15 Apr	17:30	Bulgaria	1–3	Slovenia	18–25	25–19	17–25	18–25		78–94	Report
15 Apr	20:00	Belarus	3–0	Hungary	25–20	25–18	25–21			75–59	Report
17 Apr	15:00	Slovenia	1–3	Russia	23–25	18–25	25–21	12–25		78–96	Report
17 Apr	17:30	Bulgaria	3–2	Belarus	21–25	16–25	25–19	25–21	15–13	102–103	Report
17 Apr	20:00	Hungary	1–3	Serbia	25–19	21–25	23–25	22–25		91–94	Report
18 Apr	15:00	Belarus	1–3	Slovenia	25–27	22–25	25–20	19–25		91–97	Report
18 Apr	17:30	Russia	3–0	Hungary	25–21	25–4	25–22			75–47	Report
18 Apr	20:00	Serbia	1–3	Bulgaria	19–25	21–25	25–20	22–25		87–95	Report

=== Pool II ===
Pos	Team	Pld	W	L	Pts	SW	SL	SR	SPW	SPL	SPR	Qualification
1	Italy	5	5	0	15	15	2	7.500	411	264	1.557	Semifinals
2	Turkey	5	4	1	10	13	9	1.444	487	479	1.017	Semifinals
3	Germany	5	3	2	10	11	8	1.375	408	416	0.981	5th–8th Semifinals
4	Romania	5	1	4	4	8	14	0.571	451	486	0.928	5th–8th Semifinals
5	Netherlands	5	1	4	4	7	13	0.538	391	448	0.873	
6	Ukraine	5	1	4	2	6	14	0.429	405	460	0.880	

Date	Time		Score		Set 1	Set 2	Set 3	Set 4	Set 5	Total	Report
13 Apr	15:00	Germany	3–1	Netherlands	21–25	25–18	25–16	25–17		96–76	Report
13 Apr	17:30	Turkey	3–1	Ukraine	25–23	26–24	16–25	27–25		94–97	Report
13 Apr	20:00	Romania	1–3	Italy	14–25	25–22	11–25	19–25		69–97	Report
14 Apr	15:00	Ukraine	1–3	Germany	19–25	19–25	25–18	23–25		86–93	Report
14 Apr	17:30	Italy	3–0	Netherlands	25–14	25–12	25–12			75–38	Report
14 Apr	20:00	Romania	2–3	Turkey	23–25	24–26	28–26	25–17	9–15	109–109	Report
15 Apr	15:00	Netherlands	3–1	Ukraine	18–25	25–19	25–16	25–18		93–78	Report
15 Apr	17:30	Turkey	1–3	Italy	15–25	16–25	25–14	18–25		74–89	Report
15 Apr	20:00	Germany	3–0	Romania	27–25	26–24	25–16			78–65	Report
17 Apr	15:00	Italy	3–0	Ukraine	25–14	25–17	25–12			75–43	Report
17 Apr	17:30	Turkey	3–2	Germany	25–12	25–22	22–25	25–27	17–15	114–101	Report
17 Apr	20:00	Romania	3–2	Netherlands	25–19	21–25	17–25	25–21	15–11	103–101	Report
18 Apr	15:00	Germany	0–3	Italy	16–25	11–25	13–25			40–75	Report
18 Apr	17:30	Ukraine	3–2	Romania	22–25	25–20	14–25	25–23	15–12	101–105	Report
18 Apr	20:00	Netherlands	1–3	Turkey	21–25	19–25	25–21	18–25		83–96	Report

== 5th–8th classification ==
Semifinals
20 April
Slovenia	2
Romania	3
20 April
Belarus	3
Germany	1

5th place match
21 April
Romania	3
Belarus	0
7th place match
21 April
Slovenia	2
Germany	3

=== 5th–8th Semifinals ===
Date	Time		Score		Set 1	Set 2	Set 3	Set 4	Set 5	Total	Report
20 April	12:00	Slovenia	2–3	Romania	24–26	25–18	25–20	25–27	10–15	109–106	Report
20 April	14:30	Belarus	3–1	Germany	17–25	25–23	26–24	25–19		93–91	Report

=== 7th place match ===
Date	Time		Score		Set 1	Set 2	Set 3	Set 4	Set 5	Total	Report
21 April	10:00	Slovenia	2–3	Germany	25–23	25–19	17–25	20–25	7–15	94–107	Report

=== 5th place match ===
Date	Time		Score		Set 1	Set 2	Set 3	Set 4	Set 5	Total	Report
21 April	12:30	Romania	3–0	Belarus	25–16	25–21	25–11			75–48	Report

== Final round ==
Semifinals
20 April
Russia	3
Turkey	0
20 April
Italy	3
Bulgaria	1

Final
21 April
Russia	3
Italy	1
3rd place match
21 April
Turkey	3
Bulgaria	1

=== Semifinals ===
Date	Time		Score		Set 1	Set 2	Set 3	Set 4	Set 5	Total	Report
20 April	17:00	Russia	3–0	Turkey	25–18	25–18	25–14			75–50	Report
20 April	19:30	Italy	3–1	Bulgaria	21–25	25–22	25–10	28–26		99–83	Report

=== 3rd place match ===
Date	Time		Score		Set 1	Set 2	Set 3	Set 4	Set 5	Total	Report
21 April	15:30	Turkey	3–1	Bulgaria	25–21	25–20	21–25	25–19		96–85	Report

=== Final ===
Date	Time		Score		Set 1	Set 2	Set 3	Set 4	Set 5	Total	Report
21 April	18:00	Russia	3–1	Italy	30–28	26–24	20–25	26–24		102–101	Report

== Final standing ==
Rank	Team
1st place, gold medalist(s)	Russia
2nd place, silver medalist(s)	Italy
3rd place, bronze medalist(s)	Turkey
4	Bulgaria
5	Romania
6	Belarus
7	Germany
8	Slovenia
9	Serbia
10	Netherlands
11	Ukraine
12	Hungary

Qualified for the 2019 Girls' U18 World Championship

2018 Girls' U17 European champions

Russia
4th title

12–woman roster
Elizaveta Kochurina, Valeriia Perova, Polina Matveeva, Elizaveta Gosheva, Vita Akimova, Elizaveta Popova, Ortal Ivgi, Alexandra Murushkina, Varvara Shubina, Elizaveta Apalikova, Valeriia Gorbunova, Natalia Slautina
Head coach
Svetlana Safronova

== Awards ==
At the conclusion of the tournament, the following players were selected as the tournament dream team.

- Most valuable player
  (Russia) Valeriia Gorbunova
- Best setter
  (Russia) Polina Matveeva
- Best outside spikers
  (Bulgaria) Aleksandra Georgieva
  (Italy) Loveth Omoruyi
- Best middle blockers
  (Russia) Elizaveta Kochurina
  (Italy) Claudia Consoli
- Best opposite spiker
  (Turkey) Sude Hacımustafaoğlu
- Best libero
  (Turkey) Gülce Güçtekin
