= 2026 Women's U18 European Volleyball Championship =

Tournament details
- Host countries: Latvia; Lithuania
- Cities: Riga; Šiauliai
- Dates: 1–12 July 2026
- Teams: 16
- Venues: 2

Final positions
- Champions: Italy (4th title)
- Runners-up: Turkey
- Third place: Hungary
- Fourth place: France

The 2026 Women's U18 European Volleyball Championship, also referred to as EuroVolleyU18W 2026, will be the 17th edition of the biannual continental tournament for women's under-18 national volleyball teams, organised by Europe's governing volleyball body, CEV. The tournament will be held between from 1 to 12 July 2026. It will be organised in Latvia and Lithuania, marking the first time both countries will host this championship.

16 teams will participate for the second time since the expansion in 2024. Qualification took place between October 2025 and March 2026 to decide the final 15 spots. The co-hosts Latvia and Lithuania qualified automatically.

This competition acts as a qualifier, with the top teams qualifying for the 2027 FIVB Volleyball Girls' U19 World Championship in an unknown country.

Bulgaria are the defending champions, having beaten Belgium, 3–0, in the final in Blaj.

== Host selection ==
On 23 May 2024, Latvia and Lithuania were given the hosting rights, marking the first time both countries will host this championship.

=== Quotes ===
"We have been dreaming for several years about the possibility of organising the Final Round of an age-group Volleyball European Championship. The desire to organise such tournaments in Europe is usually high, so we greatly appreciate that our vision for the development of women’s Volleyball in this region has convinced the European Volleyball Confederation to grant such an opportunity to Latvia and Lithuania. We are very pleased that together with Lithuania we have united in one team as real braliukas [brothers] and we are confident that we will be able to deliver a high-level competition together with our neighbours,".

— Arturs Vitkovskis, board member of the Latvian Volleyball Federation.

"When Arturs Vitkovskis called us and proposed to deliver the final round of a European Championship together, the first thought was just "Bring it on". Although for us it will be the first event of such calibre indoors, we have been dreaming about it for far too long. Such collaborations represent a huge opportunity to show that through cooperation and friendship we can achieve more great things and grow our sports together. Strengthening partnerships and creating opportunities for our athletes, showcasing the best ones is a huge impulse for the development of the sports and will help us show to our governing bodies how much Volleyball matters within our communities. We are thankful for such a strong and reliable partner as the Latvian Volleyball Federation, for their trust in us and for inviting us to join this adventure. We are sure that it will be a remarkable event for the youth across the whole Baltic region."

— Alisa Česnulevičiūtė, secretary general of the Lithuanian Volleyball Federation.

== Group stage ==
=== Pool A ===
- All times are local.

Pos	Team	Pld	W	L	Pts	SW	SL	SR	SPW	SPL	SPR	Qualification
1	Turkey	7	7	0	20	21	2	10.500	557	369	1.509	Semifinals
2	Italy	7	6	1	19	20	5	4.000	592	462	1.281	Semifinals
3	Belgium	7	4	3	12	14	10	1.400	514	470	1.094	
4	Poland	7	4	3	12	12	11	1.091	510	473	1.078	
5	Spain	7	3	4	10	13	13	1.000	545	525	1.038	
6	Czech Republic	7	3	4	8	10	15	0.667	513	527	0.973	
7	Latvia (H)	7	1	6	3	5	18	0.278	383	548	0.699	
8	Iceland	7	0	7	0	0	21	0.000	285	525	0.543	

Updated to match(es) played on 8 July 2026. Source: Report
(H) Host

Date	Time		Score		Set 1	Set 2	Set 3	Set 4	Set 5	Total	Report
1 July	12:30	Italy	3–0	Iceland	25–14	25–11	25–10			75–35	Report
1 July	15:00	Turkey	3–0	Czech Republic	25–18	25–21	25–16			75–55	Report
1 July	17:30	Belgium	1–3	Spain	25–18	20–25	16–25	19–25		80–93	Report
1 July	20:00	Poland	3–1	Latvia	25–11	23–25	25–14	25–15		98–65	Report
2 July	12:30	Poland	3–1	Spain	25–20	15–25	25–20	25–21		90–86	Report
2 July	15:00	Turkey	3–0	Belgium	25–10	25–16	25–12			75–38	Report
2 July	17:30	Italy	3–0	Czech Republic	25–19	25–23	25–23			75–65	Report
2 July	20:00	Latvia	3–0	Iceland	25–19	25–20	25–15			75–54	Report
3 July	12:30	Czech Republic	3–0	Iceland	25–18	25–11	25–23			75–52	Report
3 July	15:00	Italy	3–1	Belgium	25–19	25–12	17–25	25–21		92–77	Report
3 July	17:30	Poland	0–3	Turkey	22–25	16–25	19–25			57–75	Report
3 July	20:00	Latvia	0–3	Spain	18–25	13–25	18–25			49–75	Report
5 July	12:30	Czech Republic	1–3	Belgium	10–25	15–25	25–19	15–25		65–94	Report
5 July	15:00	Spain	3–0	Iceland	25–7	25–8	25–21			75–36	Report
5 July	17:30	Italy	3–0	Poland	25–16	25–19	25–12			75–47	Report
5 July	20:00	Latvia	0–3	Turkey	19–25	9–25	10–25			38–75	Report
6 July	12:30	Spain	0–3	Turkey	16–25	11–25	16–25			43–75	Report
6 July	15:00	Czech Republic	0–3	Poland	22–25	19–25	17–25			58–75	Report
6 July	17:30	Belgium	3–0	Iceland	25–12	25–11	25–12			75–35	Report
6 July	20:00	Latvia	0–3	Italy	18–25	11–25	16–25			45–75	Report
8 July	12:30	Belgium	3–0	Poland	25–23	25–23	25–22			75–68	Report
8 July	15:00	Spain	1–3	Italy	25–20	24–26	16–25	21–25		86–96	Report
8 July	17:30	Turkey	3–0	Iceland	25–12	25–10	25–12			75–34	Report
8 July	20:00	Czech Republic	3–1	Latvia	25–19	21–25	25–13	25–12		96–69	Report
9 July	12:30	Turkey	3–2	Italy	27–25	25–18	20–25	20–25	15–11	107–104	Report
9 July	15:00	Poland	3–0	Iceland	25–9	25–14	25–16			75–39	Report
9 July	17:30	Spain	2–3	Czech Republic	25–20	14–25	18–25	25–14	5–15	87–99	Report
9 July	20:00	Belgium	3–0	Latvia	25–13	25–14	25–15			75–42	Report

=== Pool B ===
Pos	Team	Pld	W	L	Pts	SW	SL	SR	SPW	SPL	SPR	Qualification
1	France	7	6	1	17	18	6	3.000	561	442	1.269	Semifinals
2	Hungary	7	6	1	17	20	10	2.000	679	601	1.130	Semifinals
3	Netherlands	7	5	2	16	18	7	2.571	579	504	1.149	
4	Bulgaria	7	4	3	14	17	12	1.417	639	612	1.044	
5	Germany	7	4	3	11	13	11	1.182	525	519	1.012	
6	Greece	7	2	5	6	8	17	0.471	525	585	0.897	
7	Finland	7	1	6	3	6	18	0.333	489	575	0.850	
8	Lithuania (H)	7	0	7	0	2	21	0.095	408	567	0.720	

Updated to match(es) played on 8 July 2026. Source: Report
(H) Host

Date	Time		Score		Set 1	Set 2	Set 3	Set 4	Set 5	Total	Report
1 July	12:30	Hungary	3–1	Greece	23–25	25–19	26–24	25–17		99–85	Report
1 July	15:00	Germany	3–2	Bulgaria	23–25	25–15	25–18	30–32	15–12	118–102	Report
1 July	17:30	France	3–0	Lithuania	25–12	25–14	25–13			75–39	Report
1 July	20:00	Finland	0–3	Netherlands	17–25	16–25	19–25			52–75	Report
2 July	12:30	Netherlands	1–3	Bulgaria	19–25	24–26	25–23	13–25		81–99	Report
2 July	15:00	Finland	0–3	France	15–25	25–27	15–25			55–77	Report
2 July	17:30	Lithuania	1–3	Hungary	15–25	19–25	25–19	19–25		78–94	Report
2 July	20:00	Greece	0–3	Germany	11–25	22–25	18–25			51–75	Report
3 July	12:30	France	0–3	Netherlands	23–25	18–25	17–25			58–75	Report
3 July	15:00	Bulgaria	3–1	Greece	25–22	15–25	25–17	25–17		90–81	Report
3 July	17:30	Germany	3–0	Lithuania	25–22	25–14	25–20			75–56	Report
3 July	20:00	Hungary	3–1	Finland	25–18	21–25	25–19	25–19		96–81	Report
5 July	12:30	Finland	0–3	Germany	22–25	21–25	20–25			63–75	Report
5 July	15:00	France	3–2	Hungary	28–26	25–8	21–25	14–25	15–11	103–95	Report
5 July	17:30	Lithuania	0–3	Bulgaria	21–25	18–25	10–25			49–75	Report
5 July	20:00	Netherlands	3–0	Greece	25–23	25–21	25–22			75–66	Report
6 July	12:30	Bulgaria	3–1	Finland	25–17	25–9	23–25	25–23		98–74	Report
6 July	15:00	Hungary	3–2	Netherlands	21–25	25–22	25–20	23–25	15–9	109–101	Report
6 July	17:30	Greece	3–1	Lithuania	25–18	17–25	29–27	25–14		96–84	Report
6 July	20:00	Germany	0–3	France	18–25	20–25	21–25			59–75	Report
8 July	12:30	Hungary	3–0	Germany	25–15	25–22	25–11			75–48	Report
8 July	15:00	Finland	1–3	Greece	18–25	25–22	22–25	22–25		87–97	Report
8 July	17:30	Netherlands	3–0	Lithuania	25–18	25–10	25–17			75–45	Report
8 July	20:00	France	3–1	Bulgaria	23–25	25–16	25–14	25–15		98–70	Report
9 July	12:30	Greece	0–3	France	14–25	19–25	16–25			49–75	Report
9 July	15:00	Germany	1–3	Netherlands	16–25	25–22	23–25	11–25		75–97	Report
9 July	17:30	Lithuania	0–3	Finland	25–27	18–25	14–25			57–77	Report
9 July	20:00	Bulgaria	2–3	Hungary	25–22	25–22	18–25	22–25	15–17	105–111	Report

== Final round ==
- All time are local.

Semifinals
11 July
Turkey	3
Hungary	1
11 July
France	0
Italy	3

Final
12 July
Turkey	0
Italy	3
3rd place match
12 July
Hungary	3
France	1

=== Semifinals ===
Date	Time		Score		Set 1	Set 2	Set 3	Set 4	Set 5	Total	Report
11 Jul	15:00	Turkey	3–1	Hungary	25–22	25–6	27–29	25–19		102–76	
11 Jul	18:00	France	0–3	Italy	21–25	22–25	8–25			51–75	

=== 3rd place match ===
Date	Time		Score		Set 1	Set 2	Set 3	Set 4	Set 5	Total	Report
12 Jul	15:00	Hungary	3–1	France	25–23	25–27	25–20	25–18		100–88	

=== Final ===
Date	Time		Score		Set 1	Set 2	Set 3	Set 4	Set 5	Total	Report
12 Jul	18:00	Turkey	0–3	Italy	20–25	16–25	15–25			51–75	

== Final standing ==
Rank	Team
1st place, gold medalist(s)	Italy
2nd place, silver medalist(s)	Turkey
3rd place, bronze medalist(s)	Hungary
4	France
5	Netherlands
6	Belgium
7	Bulgaria
8	Poland
9	Germany
10	Spain
11	Czech Republic
12	Greece
13	Finland
14	Latvia
15	Lithuania
16	Iceland

Qualified for the 2027 U19 World Championship as defending champions
Qualified for the 2027 U19 World Championship

== Qualified teams for FIVB U19 World Championship ==
The following teams from CEV qualified for the 2027 FIVB Girls' U19 World Championship.

Team	Qualified on	Previous appearances in the FIVB U19 World Championship^{1}
Turkey	6 July 2026	13 (1993, 1999, 1993, 2007, 2009, **2011**, 2013, 2015, 2017, 2019, 2021, 2023, 2025)
Italy	6 July 2026	16 (1995, 1997, 1999, 2001, 2003, 2005, 2007, 2009, 2011, 2013, **2015**, **2017**, 2019, 2021, 2023, 2025)
Hungary	8 July 2026	2 (2003, 2023)
France	8 July 2026	2 (1993, 1995)
Netherlands	9 July 2026	2 (1997, 1999)
Belgium	9 July 2026	4 (2007, 2009, 2015, 2025)

^{1} Bold indicates champions for that year.

== See also ==
- 2026 Men's U18 European Volleyball Championship
