= Volleyball at the European Youth Summer Olympic Festival =

Volleyball has featured as a sport at the European Youth Summer Olympic Festival since its First edition in 1991 For women and then in 2003 for men, It has appeared on the programme at every subsequent edition of the biennial multi-sport event.

== Men's tournaments ==
Year	Host Country	Gold medal game			Bronze medal game		
Year	Host Country	Gold	Score	Silver	Bronze	Score	Fourth place
2003; Details	France	Poland	–	Germany	Slovenia	–	
2005		No volleyball events were held					
2007		No volleyball events were held					
2009; Details	Finland	Poland	3–2	Serbia	Germany	3–1	Finland
2011; Details	Turkey	Turkey	3–1	Russia	France	3–0	Serbia
2013; Details	Netherlands	Russia	3–1	Poland	Turkey	3–2	Italy
2015; Details	(Georgia (country)); Georgia	Poland	3–0	Bulgaria	Italy	3–1	Czech Republic
2017; Details	Hungary	Italy	3–1	France	Russia	3–0	Czech Republic
2019; Details	(Azerbaijan); Baku	Italy	3–0	Belgium	Russia	3–0	Belarus
2022; Details	(Slovakia); Banská Bystrica	Italy	3–0	Bulgaria	Czech Republic	3–1	Turkey
2023; Details	(Slovenia); Maribor	France	3–1	Italy	Czech Republic	3–0	Belgium
2025; Details	(North Macedonia); Skopje	Poland	3–0	France	Italy	3–2	Slovenia

=== Medal table ===
Rank	Nation	Gold	Silver	Bronze	Total
1	Poland	4	1	0	5
2	Italy	3	1	2	6
3	France	1	2	1	4
4	Russia	1	1	2	4
5	Turkey	1	0	1	2
6	Bulgaria	0	2	0	2
7	Germany	0	1	1	2
8	Belgium	0	1	0	1
8	Serbia	0	1	0	1
10	Czech Republic	0	0	2	2
11	Slovenia	0	0	1	1
Totals (11 entries)		10	10	10	30

== Women's tournaments ==
Year	Host Country	Gold medal game			Bronze medal game		
Year	Host Country	Gold	Score	Silver	Bronze	Score	Fourth place
1991; Details	Belgium	Italy	–	Germany	Belgium	–	
1993; Details	Netherlands	Russia	–	Ukraine	Germany	–	
1995; Details	United Kingdom	France	–	Ukraine	Russia	–	
1997; Details	Portugal	Russia	–	Italy	Poland	–	
1999; Details	Denmark	Poland	–	Russia	Italy	–	
2001; Details	Spain	Germany		Italy	Russia		
2003		No volleyball events were held					
2005; Details	Italy	Italy	3–2	Croatia	Netherlands	3–2	Poland
2007; Details	Serbia	Belgium	3–0	Serbia	Turkey	3–1	Italy
2009; Details	Finland	Turkey	3–2	Russia	Belgium	3–1	Germany
2011; Details	Turkey	Italy	3–1	Serbia	Turkey	3–0	Poland
2013; Details	Netherlands	Slovenia	3–1	Serbia	Netherlands	3–0	Germany
2015; Details	(Georgia (country)); Georgia	Turkey	3–2	Serbia	Italy	3–1	Belgium
2017; Details	Hungary	Italy	3–2	Belarus	Russia	3–0	Serbia
2019; Details	(Azerbaijan); Baku	Russia	3–1	Romania	Turkey	3–0	Italy
2022; Details	(Slovakia); Banská Bystrica	Italy	3–1	Turkey	Poland	3–2	Serbia
2023; Details	(Slovenia); Maribor	Slovenia	3–0	Germany	Netherlands	3–0	Hungary
2025; Details	(North Macedonia); Skopje	Turkey	3–1	Italy	Poland	3–2	Hungary

=== Medal table ===
Rank	Nation	Gold	Silver	Bronze	Total
1	Italy	5	3	2	10
2	Russia	3	2	3	8
3	Turkey	3	1	3	7
4	Slovenia	2	0	0	2
5	Germany	1	2	1	4
6	Poland	1	0	3	4
7	Belgium	1	0	2	3
8	France	1	0	0	1
9	Serbia	0	4	0	4
10	Ukraine	0	2	0	2
11	Belarus	0	1	0	1
11	Croatia	0	1	0	1
11	Romania	0	1	0	1
14	Netherlands	0	0	3	3
Totals (14 entries)		17	17	17	51

== Overall medal table ==
Rank	Nation	Gold	Silver	Bronze	Total
1	Italy (ITA)	8	4	4	16
2	Poland (POL)	5	1	3	9
3	Russia (RUS)	4	3	5	12
4	Turkey (TUR)	4	1	4	9
5	France (FRA)	2	2	1	5
6	Slovenia (SLO)	2	0	1	3
7	Germany (GER)	1	3	2	6
8	Belgium (BEL)	1	1	2	4
9	Serbia (SRB)	0	5	0	5
10	Bulgaria (BUL)	0	2	0	2
10	Ukraine (UKR)	0	2	0	2
12	Belarus (BLR)	0	1	0	1
12	Croatia (CRO)	0	1	0	1
12	Romania (ROU)	0	1	0	1
15	Netherlands (NED)	0	0	3	3
16	Czech Republic (CZE)	0	0	2	2
Totals (16 entries)		27	27	27	81

== See also ==
- Athletics at the European Youth Olympic Festival
