= Netherlands women's national under-19 volleyball team =

The Netherlands U19
- Association: Nederlandse Volleybalbond
- Confederation: CEV

Uniforms
Home	Away	Third

FIVB U19 World Championship
- Appearances: 2 (First in 1997)
- Best result: 9th Place : (1997, 1999)

Europe U18 / U17 Championship
- Appearances: 7 (First in 1999)
- Best result: (silver) Runners-Up : (1999)
- www.volleybal.nl (in Dutch)

The Netherlands women's national under-19 volleyball team represents Netherlands in international women's volleyball competitions and friendly matches under the age 19 and it is ruled by the Dutch Volleyball Association That is an affiliate of Federation of International Volleyball FIVB and also a part of European Volleyball Confederation CEV.

== Results ==
=== Summer Youth Olympics ===
Champions Runners up Third place Fourth place

Youth Olympic Games
Year	Round	Position	Pld	W	L	SW	SL	Squad
(Singapore) 2010	Did not qualify							
(China) 2014	No Volleyball Event							
(Argentina) 2018	No Volleyball Event							
Total	0 Titles	0/1						

=== FIVB U19 World Championship ===
Champions Runners up Third place Fourth place

FIVB U19 World Championship
Year	Round	Position	Pld	W	L	SW	SL	Squad
(Brazil) 1989	Didn't Qualify							
(Portugal) 1991	Didn't Qualify							
(Czechoslovakia) 1993	Didn't Qualify							
(France) 1995	Didn't Qualify							
(Thailand) 1997		9th place						Squad
(Portugal) 1999		9th place						Squad
(Croatia) 2001	Didn't Qualify							
(Poland) 2003	Didn't Qualify							
(Macau) 2005	Didn't Qualify							
(Mexico) 2007	Didn't Qualify							
(Thailand) 2009	Didn't Qualify							
(Turkey) 2011	Didn't Qualify							
(Thailand) 2013	Didn't Qualify							
(Peru) 2015	Didn't Qualify							
(Argentina) 2017	Didn't Qualify							
(Egypt) 2019	Didn't Qualify							
(Mexico) 2021	Didn't Qualify							
Total	0 Titles	2/17						

=== Europe U18 / U17 Championship ===
Champions Runners up Third place Fourth place

Europe U18 / U17 Championship
Year	Round	Position	Pld	W	L	SW	SL	Squad
(Spain) 1995	Didn't Enter							
(Slovakia) 1997	Didn't Qualify							
(Poland) 1999		2nd place						Squad
(Czech Republic) 2001	Didn't Qualify							
(Croatia) 2003	Didn't Qualify							
(Estonia) 2005	Didn't Qualify							
(Czech Republic) 2007		7th place						Squad
(Netherlands) 2009		11th place						Squad
(Turkey) 2011	Didn't Qualify							
(Montenegro) / (Serbia) 2013		9th place						Squad
(Bulgaria) 2015		9th place						Squad
(Netherlands) 2017		7th place						Squad
(Bulgaria) 2018		10th place						Squad
(Montenegro) 2020	Didn't Qualify							
Total	0 Titles	7/14						

== Team ==
=== Current squad ===
The following is the Dutch roster in the 2017 European U18 Championship.

Head coach: (Netherlands) Julien Van De Vyver

Name	Year of birth	Height	Weight	Spike	Block
Baijens Indy	2001	1.90 m (6 ft 3 in)	67 kg (148 lb)	000 cm (0 in)	000 cm (0 in)
Bekhuts Wies	2001	1.75 m (5 ft 9 in)	55 kg (121 lb)	000 cm (0 in)	000 cm (0 in)
Boereboom Matilde	2001	1.69 m (5 ft 7 in)	55 kg (121 lb)	000 cm (0 in)	000 cm (0 in)
oom Dagmar	2000	1.81 m (5 ft 11 in)	67 kg (148 lb)	000 cm (0 in)	000 cm (0 in)
Bröring Kirsten	2000	1.90 m (6 ft 3 in)	77 kg (170 lb)	000 cm (0 in)	000 cm (0 in)
Crijns Claire	2000	1.86 m (6 ft 1 in)	68 kg (150 lb)	000 cm (0 in)	000 cm (0 in)
De Vries Tess	2001	1.84 m (6 ft 0 in)	67 kg (148 lb)	000 cm (0 in)	000 cm (0 in)
Denessen Eke	2001	1.75 m (5 ft 9 in)	55 kg (121 lb)	000 cm (0 in)	000 cm (0 in)
Geerdink Eline	2000	1.96 m (6 ft 5 in)	73 kg (161 lb)	000 cm (0 in)	000 cm (0 in)
Hendricks Lara	2000	1.80 m (5 ft 11 in)	57 kg (126 lb)	000 cm (0 in)	000 cm (0 in)
Jasper Hester	2001	1.75 m (5 ft 9 in)	63 kg (139 lb)	000 cm (0 in)	000 cm (0 in)
Korevaar Demi	2000	1.87 m (6 ft 2 in)	71 kg (157 lb)	000 cm (0 in)	000 cm (0 in)
Kos Susanne	2000	1.70 m (5 ft 7 in)	64 kg (141 lb)	000 cm (0 in)	000 cm (0 in)
Marring Nova	2001	1.81 m (5 ft 11 in)	68 kg (150 lb)	000 cm (0 in)	000 cm (0 in)
Meijers Annick	2000	1.88 m (6 ft 2 in)	70 kg (150 lb)	000 cm (0 in)	000 cm (0 in)
Meinders Fleur	2001	1.83 m (6 ft 0 in)	71 kg (157 lb)	000 cm (0 in)	000 cm (0 in)
Mulder Vera	2000	1.89 m (6 ft 2 in)	68 kg (150 lb)	000 cm (0 in)	000 cm (0 in)
Nobel Lisa	2000	1.81 m (5 ft 11 in)	66 kg (146 lb)	000 cm (0 in)	000 cm (0 in)
Van Aalen Sarah	2000	1.82 m (6 ft 0 in)	68 kg (150 lb)	000 cm (0 in)	000 cm (0 in)
Van Der Woude Maureen	2000	1.90 m (6 ft 3 in)	74 kg (163 lb)	000 cm (0 in)	000 cm (0 in)
Van Solkema Wies	2000	1.77 m (5 ft 10 in)	61 kg (134 lb)	000 cm (0 in)	000 cm (0 in)
Vellener Charlot	2001	1.79 m (5 ft 10 in)	74 kg (163 lb)	000 cm (0 in)	000 cm (0 in)
Vos Rianne	2000	1.78 m (5 ft 10 in)	56 kg (123 lb)	000 cm (0 in)	000 cm (0 in)
Wagner Quinty	2000	1.80 m (5 ft 11 in)	68 kg (150 lb)	000 cm (0 in)	000 cm (0 in)
