= Finland women's national under-19 volleyball team =

Finland U19
- Association: Finnish Volleyball Federation
- Confederation: CEV

Uniforms
Home	Away	Third

FIVB U19 World Championship
- Appearances: No Appearances

Europe U18 / U17 Championship
- Appearances: 3 (First in 2022)
- Best result: 12th Place : (2022)
- www.lentopalloliitto.fi/en (in English)

The Finland women's national under-19 volleyball team represents Finland in international women's volleyball competitions and friendly matches under the age 19 and it is ruled and managed by the Finnish Volleyball Federation That is an affiliate of Federation of International Volleyball FIVB and also a part of European Volleyball Confederation CEV.

== Results ==
=== Summer Youth Olympics ===
Champions Runners up Third place Fourth place

Youth Olympic Games
Year	Round	Position	Pld	W	L	SW	SL	Squad
(Singapore) 2010	Didn't qualify							
(China) 2014	No Volleyball Event							
(Argentina) 2018	No Volleyball Event							
Total	0 Titles	0/1						

=== FIVB U19 World Championship ===
Champions Runners up Third place Fourth place

FIVB U19 World Championship
Year	Round	Position	Pld	W	L	SW	SL	Squad
(Brazil) 1989 →	Didn't qualify							
(Mexico) 2021 ←	Didn't qualify							
Total	0 Titles	0/17						

=== Europe Girls' Youth Championship ===
Champions Runners up Third place Fourth place

Europe Girls' Youth Championship
Year	Round	Position	Pld	W	L	SW	SL	Squad
(Spain) 1995	Didn't qualify							
(Slovakia) 1997	Didn't qualify							
(Poland) 1999	Didn't qualify							
(Czech Republic) 2001	Didn't qualify							
(Croatia) 2003	Didn't qualify							
(Estonia) 2005	Didn't qualify							
(Czech Republic) 2007	Didn't qualify							
(Netherlands) 2009	Didn't qualify							
(Turkey) 2011	Didn't qualify							
2013 Q	Group Stages	Third Placed						
2015 Q	Group Stages	Third Placed						
2017 Q	Second Round	Runners-up						
2018 Q	Group Stages	Third Placed						
(Montenegro) 2020	Finland has qualified but later it withdraw							
(Czech Republic) 2022	First Round	12th						
(Romania) (Greece) 2024	First Round	14th						
(Latvia) (Lithuania) 2026	First Round	13th						
Total	0 Titles	3/15						

== Team ==
=== Current squad ===
The Following players is the Finnish players that Competed in the 2018 Girls' U17 Volleyball European Championship Qualifiacations

#	name	position	height	weight	birthday	spike	block
	heikkilä anna	middle-blocker	184	70	2002	304	284
	Heikkinen tiia	middle-blocker	182	74	2002	300	280
	Honkanen veera	libero	174	60	2003	282	262
	Kukkonen lotta	setter	172	58	2002	285	265
	Kuusela linnea	outside-spiker	177	66	2002	292	272
	Laukkanen laura	middle-blocker	186	78	2002	302	282
	Launonen adelia	outside-spiker	172	62	2002	292	272
	Lehto sofia	setter	174	70	2003	280	260
	Luostarinen oona	libero	172	64	2002	276	256
	Matilainen anna ilona	setter	168	58	2002	276	256
	Mustonen jenna	outside-spiker	176	69	2002	290	270
	Ojaharju liine	middle-blocker	182	76	2003	298	278
	Ollonen aino	outside-spiker	180	68	2002	296	276
	Ollonen sanni	outside-spiker	178	66	2003	290	270
	Piippo sara	outside-spiker	172	62	2003	288	268
	Porthen elviira	opposite	182	75	2002	296	276
	Rantanen sanni	middle-blocker	189	68	2002	302	282
	Rinta-tassi liisa	middle-blocker	185	76	2002	302	282
	Sairiala inka	libero	170	60	2003	276	256
	Ternava arita	opposite	180	67	2002	304	284
	Viljanen oona	outside-spiker	178	70	2003	294	274
	Virtanen saana	setter	179	64	2003	288	268
