= Germany women's national under-19 volleyball team =

Germany U19
- Nickname(s): Die Schmetterlinge (The butterflies). Die Adler (The Eagles); Die Mannschaft (The Team)
- Association: Deutscher Volleyball-Verband
- Confederation: CEV

Uniforms
| Home | Away |

FIVB U19 World Championship
- Appearances: 5 (First in 2007)
- Best result: 5th Place : (2011)

Europe U18 / U17 Championship
- Appearances: 11 (First in 1999)
- Best result: (gold) Champions (2007)
- www.volleyball-verband.de (in German)

The Germany women's national under-19 volleyball team represents Germany in international women's volleyball competitions and friendly matches under the age 19 and it is ruled by the German Volleyball Association That is an affiliate of Federation of International Volleyball FIVB and also a part of European Volleyball Confederation CEV.

== Results ==
=== FIVB U19 World Championship ===
Champions Runners up Third place Fourth place

FIVB U19 World Championship
| Year | Round | Position | Pld | W | L | SW | SL | Squad |
|---|---|---|---|---|---|---|---|---|
| (Brazil) 1989 | See West Germany | | | | | | | |
| (Portugal) 1991 | See West Germany | | | | | | | |
| (Czechoslovakia) 1993 | Didn't Qualify | | | | | | | |
| (France) 1995 | Didn't Qualify | | | | | | | |
| (Thailand) 1997 | Didn't Qualify | | | | | | | |
| (Portugal) 1999 | Didn't Qualify | | | | | | | |
| (Croatia) 2001 | Didn't Qualify | | | | | | | |
| (Poland) 2003 | Didn't Qualify | | | | | | | |
| (Macau) 2005 | Didn't Qualify | | | | | | | |
| (Mexico) 2007 | | 11th place | | | | | | Squad |
| (Thailand) 2009 | | 10th place | | | | | | Squad |
| (Turkey) 2011 | | 5th place | | | | | | Squad |
| (Thailand) 2013 | Didn't Qualify | | | | | | | |
| (Peru) 2015 | | 6th place | | | | | | Squad |
| (Argentina) 2017 | | 6th place | | | | | | Squad |
| (Egypt) 2019 | Didn't Qualify | | | | | | | |
| (Mexico) 2021 | Didn't Qualify | | | | | | | |
| Total | 0 Titles | 5/17 | | | | | | — |

=== Europe U18 / U17 Championship ===
Champions Runners up Third place Fourth place

Europe U18 / U17 Championship
| Year | Round | Position | Pld | W | L | SW | SL | Squad |
|---|---|---|---|---|---|---|---|---|
| (Spain) 1995 | Didn't Qualify | | | | | | | |
| (Slovakia) 1997 | Didn't Qualify | | | | | | | |
| (Poland) 1999 | | 6th place | | | | | | Squad |
| (Czech Republic) 2001 | | 4th place | | | | | | Squad |
| (Croatia) 2003 | | 5th place | | | | | | Squad |
| (Estonia) 2005 | | 5th place | | | | | | Squad |
| (Czech Republic) 2007 | | 1st place | | | | | | Squad |
| (Netherlands) 2009 | | 6th place | | | | | | Squad |
| (Turkey) 2011 | | 4th place | | | | | | Squad |
| (Montenegro) / (Serbia) 2013 | | 7th place | | | | | | Squad |
| (Bulgaria) 2015 | | 6th place | | | | | | Squad |
| (Netherlands) 2017 | | 6th place | | | | | | Squad |
| (Bulgaria) 2018 | | 7th place | | | | | | Squad |
| (Montenegro) 2020 | withdrew | | | | | | | |
| (Czech Republic) 2022 | | 3rd place | | | | | | Squad |
| Total | 1 Title | 12/15 | | | | | | |

== Team ==
=== Current squad ===
The following is the German roster in the 2017 FIVB Girls' U18 World Championship.

Head coach: Jens Tietböhl

| No. | Name | Date of birth | Height | Weight | Spike | Block | 2017 club |
|---|---|---|---|---|---|---|---|
| 1 | Patricia Nestler | 17 May 2001 | 1.69 m (5 ft 7 in) | 56 kg (123 lb) | 280 cm (110 in) | 280 cm (110 in) | Dresdner Sc |
| 2 | Lea Ambrosius | 22 May 2000 | 1.89 m (6 ft 2 in) | 79 kg (174 lb) | 305 cm (120 in) | 298 cm (117 in) | Schwerner SC |
| 3 | Josepha Bock | 23 January 2000 | 1.87 m (6 ft 2 in) | 77 kg (170 lb) | 300 cm (120 in) | 289 cm (114 in) | VCO Berlin/ VC Bitterfeld-Wolf |
| 4 | Linda Bock | 27 May 2000 | 1.72 m (5 ft 8 in) | 60 kg (130 lb) | 278 cm (109 in) | 270 cm (110 in) | RC-Borken-Hoxfeld |
| 5 | Emma Cyris | 9 April 2001 | 1.87 m (6 ft 2 in) | 70 kg (150 lb) | 301 cm (119 in) | 292 cm (115 in) | VC Olympia Berlin |
| 6 | Athina Dimitriadis | 23 June 2000 | 1.95 m (6 ft 5 in) | 81 kg (179 lb) | 301 cm (119 in) | 291 cm (115 in) | VCO Berlin |
| 7 | Romy-Aylin Jatzko | 26 January 2000 | 1.87 m (6 ft 2 in) | 73 kg (161 lb) | 303 cm (119 in) | 292 cm (115 in) | VCO Berlin |
| 8 | Franziska Nitsche | 11 May 2000 | 1.79 m (5 ft 10 in) | 69 kg (152 lb) | 292 cm (115 in) | 288 cm (113 in) | VCO Dresden |
| 9 | Alexa Kaminski | 17 February 2000 | 1.88 m (6 ft 2 in) | 66 kg (146 lb) | 302 cm (119 in) | 292 cm (115 in) | VCO Schwerin |
| 10 | Lina Alsmeier | 29 June 2000 | 1.89 m (6 ft 2 in) | 70 kg (150 lb) | 305 cm (120 in) | 290 cm (110 in) | USC Münster |
| 13 | Corina Glaab | 25 May 2000 | 1.80 m (5 ft 11 in) | 65 kg (143 lb) | 291 cm (115 in) | 281 cm (111 in) | Rote Raben Vilsbiburg |
| 14 | Emilia Weske | 26 March 2000 | 1.88 m (6 ft 2 in) | 68 kg (150 lb) | 299 cm (118 in) | 290 cm (110 in) | SC Potsdam |
| 16 | Luisa Theresa Keller | 25 August 2001 | 184 m (603 ft 8 in) | 65 kg (143 lb) | 301 cm (119 in) | 285 cm (112 in) | USC Münster |
