= Turkey women's national under-19 volleyball team =

Turkey U19
- Association: Turkish Volleyball Federation
- Confederation: CEV

Uniforms
Home	Away	Third

FIVB U19 World Championship
- Appearances: 8 (First in 1993)
- Best result: (gold) Champions : (2011)

Europe U18 / U17 Championship
- Appearances: 8 (First in 2005)
- Best result: (gold) Champions : (2011)

The Turkey women's national under-19 volleyball team represents Turkey in international women's volleyball competitions and friendly matches under the age 19. It is governed by the Turkish Volleyball Federation, which is an affiliate of International Volleyball Federation FIVB and also a part of European Volleyball Confederation CEV.

== Results ==
=== Summer Youth Olympics ===
Champions Runners up Third place Fourth place

Youth Olympic Games
Year	Round	Position	Pld	W	L	SW	SL	Squad
(Singapore) 2010	Didn't qualify							
(China) 2014	No Volleyball Event							
(Argentina) 2018	No Volleyball Event							
Total	0 Titles	0/1						

=== FIVB U19 World Championship ===
Champions Runners up Third place Fourth place

FIVB U19 World Championship
Year	Round	Position	Pld	W	L	SW	SL	Squad
(Brazil) 1989	Didn't qualify							
(Portugal) 1991	Didn't qualify							
(Czechoslovakia) 1993		6th place						
(France) 1995	Didn't qualify							
(Thailand) 1997	Didn't qualify							
(Portugal) 1999		13th place						Squad
(Croatia) 2001	Didn't qualify							
(Poland) 2003	Didn't qualify							
(Macau) 2005	Didn't qualify							
(Mexico) 2007		Runners-Up	8	5	3	18	10	Squad
(Thailand) 2009		4th place	8	5	3	17	13	Squad
(Turkey) 2011		Champions	8	7	1	22	5	Squad
(Thailand) 2013		9th place	8	6	2	19	11	Squad
(Peru) 2015		4th place	8	4	4	14	13	Squad
(Argentina) 2017		4th place	8	6	2	20	6	Squad
(Egypt) 2019		9th place	8	4	4	17	13	Squad
(Mexico) 2021		7th place	8	5	3	18	11	Squad
(Hungary) (Croatia) 2023		Runners-Up	9	8	1	26	3	Squad
Total	1 Title	10/18	73	50	23	171	85	

=== Europe U18 / U17 Championship ===
Champions Runners up Third place Fourth place

Europe U18 / U17 Championship
Year	Round	Position	Pld	W	L	SW	SL	Squad
(Spain) 1995	Didn't qualify							
(Slovakia) 1997	Didn't qualify							
(Poland) 1999	Didn't qualify							
(Czech Republic) 2001	Didn't qualify							
(Croatia) 2003	Didn't qualify							
(Estonia) 2005		10th place	4	1	3	5	10	Squad
(Czech Republic) 2007		6th place						Squad
(Netherlands) 2009		5th place						Squad
(Turkey) 2011		Champions						Squad
(Montenegro) / (Serbia) 2013		Third place	7	6	1	20	6	Squad
(Bulgaria) 2015		4th place	7	5	2	16	10	Squad
(Netherlands) 2017		11th place	5	1	4	7	12	Squad
(Bulgaria) 2018		Third place	7	5	2	16	13	Squad
(Montenegro) 2020		Runners-Up	7	6	1	18	7	Squad
(Czech Republic) 2022		Runners-Up	7	5	2	16	12	Squad
Total	1 Title	10/15	44	29	15	98	70	

== See also ==
  - Men's
- Turkey Men's national volleyball team
- Turkey Men's national volleyball team U23
- Turkey Men's national volleyball team U21
- Turkey Men's national volleyball team U19
  - Women's
- Turkey Women's national volleyball team
- Turkey Women's national volleyball team U23
- Turkey Women's national volleyball team U20
- Turkey Women's national volleyball team U18
