= 2022 Girls' U17 Volleyball European Championship =

Tournament details
- Host country: Czech Republic
- Dates: 16–24 July 2022
- Teams: 12
- Venues: 2 (in 2 host cities)

Final positions
- Champions: Italy (3rd title)

Tournament awards
- MVP: (Italy) Safa Allaoui

The 2022 Girls' Youth European Volleyball Championship was the 15th edition of the Girls' Youth European Volleyball Championship, a biennial international volleyball tournament organised by the European Volleyball Confederation (CEV) the girls' under-17 national teams of Europe. The tournament was held in Czech Republic (host cities Hradec Králové and Prostějov) from 16 to 24 July 2022.

Same as previous editions, the tournament acted as the CEV qualifiers for the World Championship. Following the decision of the FIVB Board of Administration, the age categories for the age-group events have been aligned so the teams qualified for the FIVB Volleyball Girls' U19 World Championship instead of previous Girls' U18.

Both the CEV and FIVB later excluded Belarus and Russia from participation in all competitions at the start of March.

== Qualification ==
Means of qualification		Qualifier
Host country		Czech Republic
Qualification 1st round	BVA	Serbia
Qualification 1st round	EEVZA	~~Russia~~ (disqualified); Poland
Qualification 1st round	MEVZA	Slovenia
Qualification 1st round	NEVZA	Finland
Qualification 1st round	WEVZA	Italy
Qualification 2nd round	Pool A	Turkey
Qualification 2nd round	Pool B	Bulgaria
Qualification 2nd round	Pool C	Germany
Qualification 2nd round	Pool D	Netherlands
Qualification 2nd round	Pool E	Croatia
Qualification 2nd round	Best runner up	Hungary

== Venues ==
Pool I, Classification matches, Final Round		Pool II	
Hradec Králové, Czech Republic	Hradec Králové is located in Czech Republic	Prostějov, Czech Republic	Prostějov is located in Czech Republic
Sport Hall TJ Slavia	Hradec Králové is located in Czech Republic		Prostějov is located in Czech Republic
Capacity: ?	Hradec Králové is located in Czech Republic	Capacity: ?	Prostějov is located in Czech Republic

== Pools composition ==
The drawing of lots was held on 5 May 2022 and performed as follows:

1. Organiser, Czech Republic, were seeded in Pool I
2. The highest ranked participating team from the CEV European Ranking, Turkey, were seeded in Pool II
3. Remaining 10 participating teams drawn after they were previously placed in five cups as per their position in the latest European Ranking

Pot 1	Pot 2	Pot 3	Pot 4	Pot 5
Italy; Serbia	Bulgaria; Slovenia	Poland; Germany	Netherlands; Hungary	Croatia; Finland

Result

Pool I	Pool II
Czech Republic	Turkey
Serbia	Italy
Bulgaria	Slovenia
Germany	Poland
Netherlands	Hungary
Croatia	Finland

== Preliminary round ==
=== Pool I ===
Pos	Team	Pld	W	L	Pts	SW	SL	SR	SPW	SPL	SPR	Qualification
1	Serbia	5	5	0	13	15	4	3.750	445	361	1.233	Semifinals
2	Germany	5	3	2	9	11	8	1.375	413	420	0.983	Semifinals
3	Netherlands	5	3	2	8	10	9	1.111	413	407	1.015	5th–8th Semifinals
4	Bulgaria	5	2	3	8	10	10	1.000	433	445	0.973	5th–8th Semifinals
5	Croatia	5	2	3	5	7	12	0.583	427	419	1.019	
6	Czech Republic	5	0	5	2	5	15	0.333	387	466	0.830	

Date	Time		Score		Set 1	Set 2	Set 3	Set 4	Set 5	Total	Report
16 July	13:30	Serbia	3–2	Germany	25–22	20–25	22–25	25–17	16–14	108–103	Report
16 July	16:00	Croatia	3–2	Bulgaria	25–27	25–19	25–27	25–14	15–11	115–98	Report
16 July	18:30	Czech Republic	2–3	Netherlands	25–22	25–21	20–25	20–25	9–15	99–108	Report
17 July	13:30	Croatia	0–3	Serbia	22–25	16–25	24–26			62–76	Report
17 July	16:00	Bulgaria	3–1	Netherlands	25–19	19–25	25–17	29–27		98–88	Report
17 July	18:30	Germany	3–2	Czech Republic	22–25	24–26	25–23	25–23	15–10	111–107	Report
18 July	13:30	Serbia	3–2	Bulgaria	25–19	25–18	22–25	24–26	15–11	111–99	Report
18 July	16:00	Netherlands	3–0	Germany	25–17	25–18	25–14			75–49	Report
18 July	18:30	Czech Republic	1–3	Croatia	16–25	23–25	25–22	16–25		80–97	Report
20 July	13:30	Bulgaria	0–3	Germany	23–25	18–25	22–25			63–75	Report
20 July	16:00	Croatia	1–3	Netherlands	22–25	25–15	19–25	20–25		86–90	Report
20 July	18:30	Serbia	3–0	Czech Republic	25–18	25–13	25–14			75–45	Report
21 July	13:30	Germany	3–0	Croatia	25–22	25–22	25–23			75–67	Report
21 July	16:00	Netherlands	0–3	Serbia	13–25	20–25	19–25			52–75	Report
21 July	18:30	Czech Republic	0–3	Bulgaria	14–25	23–25	19–25			56–75	Report

=== Pool II ===
Pos	Team	Pld	W	L	Pts	SW	SL	SR	SPW	SPL	SPR	Qualification
1	Italy	5	4	1	12	13	6	2.167	443	384	1.154	Semifinals
2	Turkey	5	4	1	11	12	7	1.714	435	377	1.154	Semifinals
3	Slovenia	5	3	2	10	12	7	1.714	441	404	1.092	5th–8th Semifinals
4	Poland	5	3	2	8	10	9	1.111	434	414	1.048	5th–8th Semifinals
5	Hungary	5	1	4	3	7	13	0.538	411	460	0.893	
6	Finland	5	0	5	1	3	15	0.200	308	433	0.711	

Date	Time		Score		Set 1	Set 2	Set 3	Set 4	Set 5	Total	Report
16 July	13:30	Turkey	3–2	Finland	23–25	25–12	25–13	21–25	15–10	109–85	Report
16 July	16:00	Italy	3–1	Hungary	25–13	20–25	25–17	25–14		95–69	Report
16 July	18:30	Slovenia	2–3	Poland	18–25	29–27	19–25	28–26	11–15	105–118	Report
17 July	13:30	Turkey	3–1	Italy	27–25	25–20	21–25	25–18		98–88	Report
17 July	16:00	Finland	0–3	Poland	12–25	12–25	22–25			46–75	Report
17 July	18:30	Hungary	1–3	Slovenia	18–25	25–22	23–25	15–25		81–97	Report
18 July	13:30	Italy	3–0	Finland	25–16	25–13	25–13			75–42	Report
18 July	16:00	Slovenia	3–0	Turkey	25–16	25–22	25–20			75–58	Report
18 July	18:30	Poland	3–1	Hungary	26–24	21–25	25–20	25–22		97–91	Report
20 July	13:30	Italy	3–1	Slovenia	25–20	25–22	13–25	25–22		88–89	Report
20 July	16:00	Finland	1–3	Hungary	18–25	26–24	11–25	21–25		76–99	Report
20 July	18:30	Turkey	3–0	Poland	25–14	25–22	25–22			75–58	Report
21 July	13:30	Slovenia	3–0	Finland	25–18	25–18	25–23			75–59	Report
21 July	16:00	Poland	1–3	Italy	21–25	25–22	22–25	18–25		86–97	Report
21 July	18:30	Hungary	1–3	Turkey	17–25	25–20	10–25	19–25		71–95	Report

== 5th–8th classification ==
Semifinals
23 July
Slovenia	0
Bulgaria	3
23 July
Netherlands	1
Poland	3

5th place match
24 July
Bulgaria	0
Poland	3
7th place match
24 July
Slovenia	0
Netherlands	3

=== 5th–8th Semifinals ===
Date	Time		Score		Set 1	Set 2	Set 3	Set 4	Set 5	Total	Report
23 Jul	12:30	Slovenia	0–3	Bulgaria	19–25	17–25	20–25			56–75	Report
23 Jul	15:00	Netherlands	1–3	Poland	14–25	21–25	25–23	19–25		79–98	Report

=== 7th place match ===
Date	Time		Score		Set 1	Set 2	Set 3	Set 4	Set 5	Total	Report
24 Jul	10:30	Slovenia	0–3	Netherlands	12–25	22–25	20–25			54–75	Report

=== 5th place match ===
Date	Time		Score		Set 1	Set 2	Set 3	Set 4	Set 5	Total	Report
24 Jul	13:00	Bulgaria	0–3	Poland	20–25	16–25	20–25			56–75	Report

== Final round ==
Semifinals
23 July
Italy	3
Germany	0
23 July
Serbia	2
Turkey	3

Final
24 July
Italy	3
Turkey	1
3rd place match
24 July
Germany	3
Serbia	1

=== Semifinals ===
Date	Time		Score		Set 1	Set 2	Set 3	Set 4	Set 5	Total	Report
23 Jul	17:30	Italy	3–0	Germany	25–18	25–15	25–21			75–54	Report
23 Jul	20:00	Serbia	2–3	Turkey	16–25	25–20	25–18	15–25	12–15	93–103	Report

=== 3rd place match ===
Date	Time		Score		Set 1	Set 2	Set 3	Set 4	Set 5	Total	Report
24 Jul	15:30	Germany	3–1	Serbia	25–21	25–20	21–25	25–16		96–82	Report

=== Final ===
Date	Time		Score		Set 1	Set 2	Set 3	Set 4	Set 5	Total	Report
24 Jul	18:00	Italy	3–1	Turkey	25–16	23–25	25–20	25–22		98–83	Report

== Final standing ==
Rank	Team
1st place, gold medalist(s)	Italy
2nd place, silver medalist(s)	Turkey
3rd place, bronze medalist(s)	Germany
4	Serbia
5	Poland
6	Bulgaria
7	Netherlands
8	Slovenia
9	Croatia
10	Hungary
11	Czech Republic
12	Finland

Qualified for the 2023 Girls' U19 World Championship

== Awards ==
At the conclusion of the tournament, the following players were selected as the tournament dream team.

- Most valuable player
  (Italy) Safa Allaoui
- Best setter
  (Italy) Safa Allaoui
- Best outside spikers
  (Italy) Erika Esposito
  (Turkey) Ceylin Kuyan
- Best middle blockers
  (Italy) Linda Manfredini
  (Turkey) Begüm Kaçmaz
- Best opposite spiker
  (Germany) Leana Grozer
- Best libero
  (Serbia) Danica Ružić
