= Czech Republic women's national under-19 volleyball team =

Youth volleyball team representing the Czech Republic

Czech Republic U19
- Association: Czech Volleyball Federation
- Confederation: CEV

Uniforms
Home	Away	Third

FIVB U19 World Championship
- Appearances: 5 (First in 1993)
- Best result: 8th Place : (1993)

Europe U18 / U17 Championship
- Appearances: 9 (First in 1997)
- Best result: 7th place : (1999, 2001, 2015)
- www.cvf.cz (in Czech)

The Czech Republic women's national under-19 volleyball team represents Czech Republic in international women's volleyball competitions and friendly matches under the age 19.

== Results ==
=== Summer Youth Olympics ===
Champions Runners up Third place Fourth place

Youth Olympic Games
Year	Round	Position	Pld	W	L	SW	SL	Squad
(Singapore) 2010	Didn't qualify							
(China) 2014	No Volleyball Event							
(Argentina) 2018	No Volleyball Event							
Total	0 Titles	0/1						

=== FIVB U19 World Championship ===
Champions Runners up Third place Fourth place

FIVB U19 World Championship
Year	Round	Position	Pld	W	L	SW	SL	Squad
(Brazil) 1989	See Czechoslovakia							
(Portugal) 1991	See Czechoslovakia							
(Czech Republic) 1993		8th place						Squad
(France) 1995	Didn't qualify							
(Thailand) 1997		9th place						Squad
(Portugal) 1999		9th place						Squad
(Croatia) 2001		13th place						Squad
(Poland) 2003		9th place						Squad
(Macau) 2005	Didn't qualify							
(Mexico) 2007	Didn't qualify							
(Thailand) 2009	Didn't qualify							
(Turkey) 2011	Didn't qualify							
(Thailand) 2013	Didn't qualify							
(Peru) 2015	Didn't qualify							
(Argentina) 2017	Didn't qualify							
(Egypt) 2019	Didn't qualify							
(Mexico) 2021	Didn't qualify							
Total	0 Titles	5/17						

=== Europe U18 / U17 Championship ===
Champions Runners up Third place Fourth place

Europe U18 / U17 Championship
Year	Round	Position	Pld	W	L	SW	SL	Squad
(Spain) 1995	Didn't qualify							
(Slovakia) 1997		8th place						Squad
(Poland) 1999		7th place						Squad
(Czech Republic) 2001		7th place						Squad
(Croatia) 2003	Didn't qualify							
(Estonia) 2005		8th place						Squad
(Czech Republic) 2007		9th place						Squad
(Netherlands) 2009		10th place						Squad
(Turkey) 2011		11th place						Squad
(Montenegro) / (Serbia) 2013		10th place						Squad
(Bulgaria) 2015		7th place						Squad
(Netherlands) 2017	Didn't qualify							
(Bulgaria) 2018	Didn't qualify							
(Montenegro) 2020	Didn't qualify							
(Czech Republic) 2022		11th place						Squad
Total	0 Titles	10/15						
