= Yasemin Güveli =

Turkish volleyball player (born 1999)

- Güveli in 2025

Personal information
- Nickname: "Yaso"
- Nationality: Turkish
- Born: 5 January 1999 (age 27); Sarıyer, Istanbul, Turkey
- Height: 1.88 m (6 ft 2 in)
- Weight: 70 kg (154 lb)
- Spike: 325 cm (128 in)
- Block: 315 cm (124 in)

Volleyball information
- Position: Middle Blocker
- Current club: Galatasaray
- Number: 8

Career
Years
- 2014–2015
- 2015–2017
- 2017–2018
- 2018–2019
- 2019–2023
- 2023–2024
- 2024–
Teams
- Eczacıbaşı VitrA
- →Beşiktaş JK
- Eczacıbaşı VitrA
- →Karayolları SK
- Eczacıbaşı Dynavit
- →Çukurova Belediyesi
- Galatasaray

National team
- 2015
- 2016
- 2017
- 2018–
- Turkey U-17
- Turkey U-19
- Turkey U-20
- Turkey
Honours
Women's Volleyball
Representing Turkey
FIVB Volleyball Nations League
Bronze medal – third place	2021 Rimini	Team
Silver medal – second place	2018 Nanjing	Team
Gold medal – first place	2026 Macau	Team
European Championship
Bronze medal – third place	2021 Belgrade	Team
Mediterranean Games
Bronze medal – third place	2018 Tarragona	Team

Yasemin Güveli (born 5 January 1999) is a Turkish professional volleyball player. She is 1.88 m (6 ft 2 in) tall at 70 kg (150 lb), and plays in the Middle Blocker position. She plays for Galatasaray in Istanbul, and is a member of the Turkey women's national volleyball team.

== Club career ==
Güveli, nicknamed "Yaso", is 1.88 m (6 ft 2 in) tall at 70 kg (150 lb), and plays in the Middle Blocker position. She has a spike height of 325 cm (128 in) and a block height of 315 cm (124 in).

=== Eczacıbaşı (early years) ===
She started her sport career not because of her interest, but taking her tallness in account. In the beginning, her mother was against a career as a volleyball player of her, but her father supported her, and took her to the trainings. Her physical education teacher also encouraged her for volleyball playing. The little girl got injured as she trained by herself by playing the ball against the wall. Six monrhs after her injury, she was called up by the Eczacıbaşı VitrA.

She became part of the academy team at Eczacıbaşı VitrA, later renamed to Eczacıbaşı Dynavit.

=== Beşiktaş (loan) ===
Her playing time began when she was loaned out to Beşiktaş JK for two seasons.

=== Eczacıbaşı ===
After returning, she was promoted to the A team of Eczacıbaşı VitrA to appear in the 2017–18 Turkish Women's Volleyball League season.

=== Karayolları SK (loan) ===
The next season, she played at Karayolları SK for one season on loan.

=== Return to Eczacıbaşı ===
She has been with Eczacıbaşı Dynavit since the 2019–20 season.

In the 2018–19 TurkishLeague season, she was named Best Middle Blocker with Eczacıbaşı VitrA. She won the 2018–19 Turkish Cup. She was part of the Eczacıbaşı VitrA team, which became runner-up at the 2019 FIVB Volleyball Women's Club World Championship in Shaoxing, China. At the 2020–21 CEV Women's Champions League, she was named Best Middle Blocker of the League round with 22 blocks made in 20 sets of six matches of the first round. She won the 2021–22 Women's CEV Cup.

During a Turkish Cup match on 28 September 2021, she suffered interior cruciate ligament rupture on her knee. One week later, she underwent a surgery. She had to stay away from the court for the entire 2021–22 Turkish League season. In 2022, she won the bronze medal at the FIVB Volleyball Women's Club World Championship in Antalya, Turkey.

=== Galatasaray ===
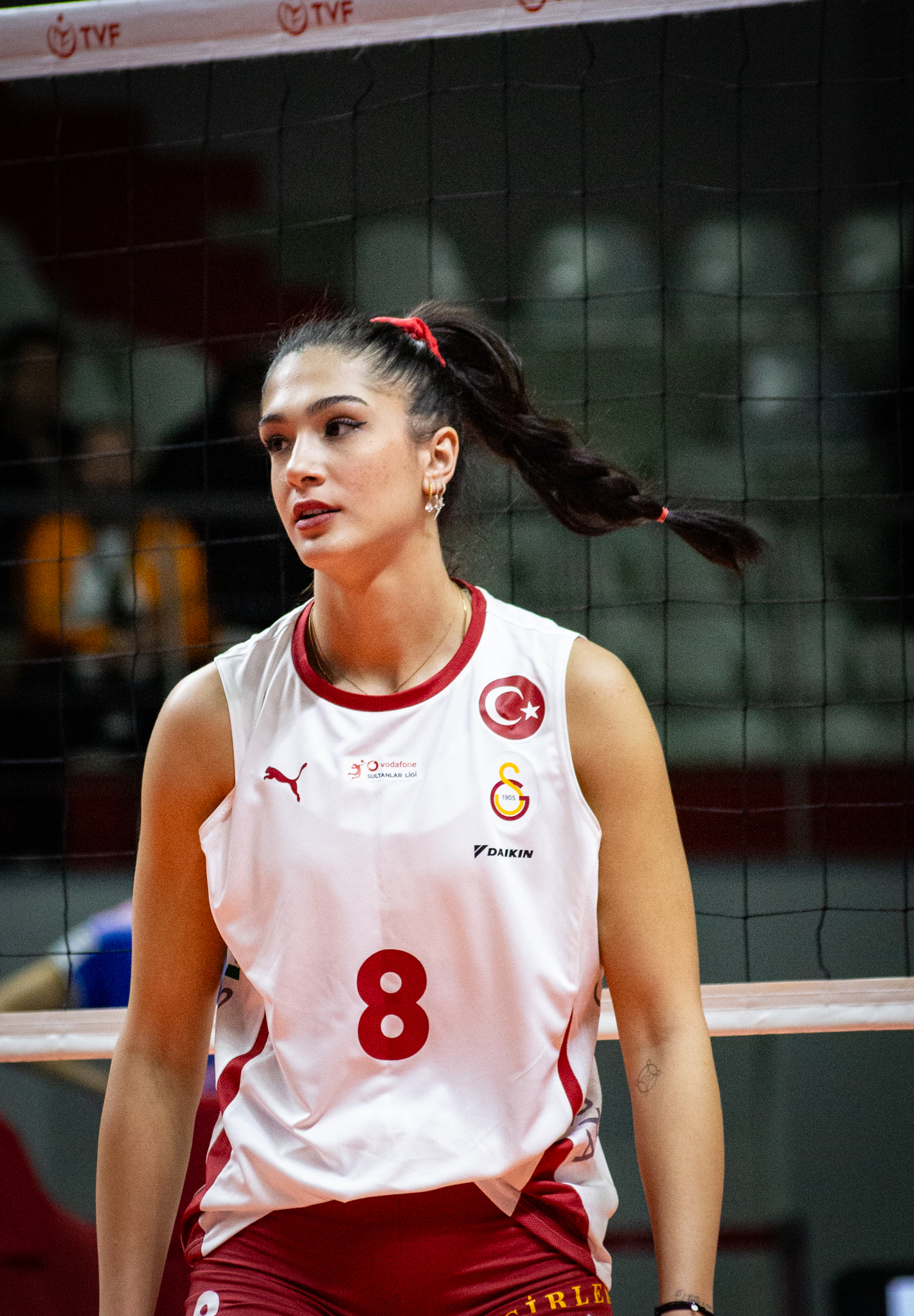
Güveli in 2024

She signed a 1-year deal with Galatasaray on 14 May 2024.

Güveli signed a new contract with Galatasaray on June 12, 2025. She finished the 2025–26 Sultans League season as the Turkish player with the most blocks.

On August 4, 2026, she signed a new contract with Galatasaray.

== International career ==
Güveli was admitted to the Turkey girls' U-17 team, and won the gold medal at the 2015 European Youth Summer Olympic Festival in Tbilisi, Georgia. At the 2015 Girls' Youth European Volleyball Championship in Bulgaria, she placed fourth. A fourth place was also her achievement at the 2015 FIVB Volleyball Girls' U18 World Championship in Peru.

With the national U-19 eram, she took the bronze medal at the 2016 Women's U19 Volleyball European Championship in Nitra, Slovakia.

She was part of the Turkey U-20 team, which finished the 2017 FIVB Volleyball Women's U20 World Championship on place four in Mexico.

She is a member of Turkey national team. She was part of the national team, which won the bronze medal at the 2018 Mediterranean Games in Tarragona, Spein. She participated at the FIVB Volleyball Women's Nations League, and won the silver medal in 2018 in Nanjing, China, and the bronze medal in 2021 in Rimini, Italy. She played in the national team, which became runner-up at the Gloria Cup in Antalya, Turkey. She took the bronze medal at the 2021 Women's European Volleyball Championship in Belgrade, Serbia.

== Personal life ==
Yasemin Güveli was born in Sarıyer, Istanbul, Turkey on 5 January 1999. After finishing the high school at Sarıyer Doğa Kolej, she studied at Bahçeşehir University.

== Honours ==
=== Club ===
==== Eczacıbaşı Dynavit (Eczacıbaşı VitrA) ====
Turkish Women's Volleyball Cup
(gold) 2018–19

FIVB Volleyball Women's Club World Championship
(silver) 2019
(bronze) 2022

Women's CEV Cup
(gold) 2021–22

==== Galatasaray ====
Women's CEV Cup
(gold) 2025–26

=== International ===
==== Turkey U-17 ====
European Youth Summer Olympic Festival
(gold) 2015

==== Turkey U-19 ====
Women's U19 Volleyball European Championship
(bronze) 2016

==== Turkey ====
FIVB Volleyball Women's Nations League
(silver) 2018
(bronze) 2021

Women's European Volleyball Championship
(bronze) 2021

Mediterranean Games
(bronze) 2018

Gloria Cup
(silver) 2019

=== Individual ===
Best Middle Blocker: 2017–18 Turkish League, 2018–19 Turkish League with Eczacıbaşı VitrA
