= CEV Women's U18 Volleyball European Championship =

Girls' junior volleyball event

- Most recent season or competition: 2026 Women's U18 European Volleyball Championship
- Sport: Volleyball
- Founded: 1995; 31 years ago
- First season: 1995
- No. of teams: 16
- Continent: Europe (CEV)
- Most recent champion: Italy (4th title)
- Most titles: Russia (5 titles)
- Website: cev.eu

The Girls' Youth European Volleyball Championship is a volleyball competition for girls' national teams with players under the age of 18 years, currently held biannually and organized by the European Volleyball Confederation, the volleyball federation for Europe. Until 2017 edition age limit was U17. As of the 2024 edition, the CEV will align the age limit for the men's and women's competitions to U18.

== Results summary ==
Year	Host	Final			3rd place match			Teams
Year	Host	Champions	Score	Runners-up	3rd place	Score	4th place	Teams
1995; Details	Spain	Italy	3–0	Russia	Slovakia	3–2	Ukraine	8
1997; Details	Slovakia	Russia	3–1	Croatia	Poland	3–0	Ukraine	8
1999; Details	Poland	Poland	3–0	Netherlands	Russia	3–1	Italy	8
2001; Details	Czech Republic	Italy	3–1	Poland	Belarus	3–0	Germany	8
2003; Details	Croatia	Croatia	3–0	Italy	Serbia and Montenegro	3–1	Russia	8
2005; Details	Estonia	Ukraine	3–2	Russia	Italy	3–1	Croatia	12
2007; Details	Czech Republic	Germany	3–0	Serbia	Italy	3–1	Belgium	12
2009; Details	Netherlands	Belgium	3–1	Serbia	Italy	3–1	Slovakia	12
2011; Details	Turkey	Turkey	3–0	Italy	Serbia	3–1	Germany	12
2013; Details	Serbia / Montenegro	Poland	3–2	Italy	Turkey	3–0	Serbia	12
2015; Details	Bulgaria	Russia	3–2	Serbia	Belgium	3–0	Turkey	12
2017; Details	Netherlands	Russia	3–2	Italy	Belarus	3–2	Serbia	12
2018; Details	Bulgaria	Russia	3–1	Italy	Turkey	3–1	Bulgaria	12
2020; Details	Montenegro	Russia	3–1	Turkey	Serbia	3–1	Italy	11
2022; Details	Czech Republic	Italy	3–1	Turkey	Germany	3–1	Serbia	12
2024; Details	Romania / Greece	Bulgaria	3–0	Belgium	Italy	3–2	Poland	16
2026; Details	Latvia / Lithuania	Italy	3–0	Turkey	Hungary	3–1	France	16

== Medal table ==
Rank	Nation	Gold	Silver	Bronze	Total
1	Russia	5	2	1	8
2	Italy	4	5	4	13
3	Poland	2	1	1	4
4	Turkey	1	3	2	6
5	Belgium	1	1	1	3
6	Croatia	1	1	0	2
7	Germany	1	0	1	2
8	Bulgaria	1	0	0	1
8	Ukraine	1	0	0	1
10	Serbia	0	3	2	5
11	Netherlands	0	1	0	1
12	Belarus	0	0	2	2
13	Hungary	0	0	1	1
13	Serbia and Montenegro	0	0	1	1
13	Slovakia	0	0	1	1
Totals (15 entries)		17	17	17	51

== Participating nations ==
Nation	(Spain) 1995	(Slovakia) 1997	(Poland) 1999	(Czech Republic) 2001	(Croatia) 2003	(Estonia) 2005	(Czech Republic) 2007	(Netherlands) 2009	(Turkey) 2011	(Montenegro) (Serbia) 2013	(Bulgaria) 2015	(Netherlands) 2017	(Bulgaria) 2018	(Montenegro) 2020	(Czech Republic) 2022	(Romania) (Greece) 2024	(Latvia) (Lithuania) 2026	Years
Austria						7th												1
Belarus		6th		3rd	8th	6th						3rd	6th	9th				7
Belgium			5th				4th	1st	10th		3rd					2nd	6th	7
Bulgaria	7th										11th	10th	4th	10th	6th	1st	7th	8
Croatia		2nd			1st	4th									9th	10th		5
Czech Republic		8th	7th	7th		8th	9th	10th	11th	10th	7th				11th		11th	11
Estonia						11th	10th											2
Finland															12th	14th	13th	3
France							8th			11th							4th	3
Germany			6th	4th	5th	5th	1st	6th	4th	7th	6th	6th	7th	DNP	3rd	5th	9th	14
Greece								12th	8th	5th	10th	12th				11th	12th	7
Hungary					7th	12th		7th					12th		10th	8th	3rd	7
Iceland																	16th	1
Italy	1st	5th	4th	1st	2nd	3rd	3rd	3rd	2nd	2nd	5th	2nd	2nd	4th	1st	3rd	1st	17
Latvia	5th		8th														14th	3
Lithuania																16th	15th	2
Montenegro										12th				11th				2
Netherlands			2nd				7th	11th		9th	9th	7th	10th		7th	13th	5th	10
Poland	6th	3rd	1st	2nd	6th		11th		5th	1st	8th	8th		6th	5th	4th	8th	14
Romania												9th	5th	5th		12th		4
Russia	2nd	1st	3rd	5th	4th	2nd	5th	9th		8th	1st	1st	1st	1st	DQ			13
Serbia							2nd	2nd	3rd	4th	2nd	4th	9th	3rd	4th	15th		10
Serbia and Montenegro					3rd	9th												2
Slovakia	3rd	7th						4th	6th					8th				5
Slovenia									9th	6th	12th	5th	8th	7th	8th	7th		8
Spain	8th			6th					7th							6th	10th	5
Turkey						10th	6th	5th	1st	3rd	4th	11th	3rd	2nd	2nd	9th	2nd	12
Ukraine	4th	4th		8th		1st	12th	8th	12th				11th					8
