= Hungary women's national under-19 volleyball team =

Youth volleyball team representing Hungary

Hungary U19
- Association: Hungarian Volleyball Federation
- Confederation: CEV

Uniforms
Home	Away	Third

FIVB U19 World Championship
- Appearances: 1 (First in 2003)
- Best result: 13th place : (2003)

Europe U18 / U17 Championship
- Appearances: 4 (First in 2003)
- Best result: 7th place : (2003, 2009)
- Hungarian Volleyball Federation

The Hungary women's national under-19 volleyball team represents Hungary in international women's volleyball competitions and friendly matches under the age 19 and it is ruled and managed by the Hungarian Volleyball Federation That is an affiliate of Federation of International Volleyball FIVB and also a part of European Volleyball Confederation CEV.

== Results ==
=== Summer Youth Olympics ===
Champions Runners up Third place Fourth place

Youth Olympic Games
Year	Round	Position	Pld	W	L	SW	SL	Squad
(Singapore) 2010	Didn't qualify							
(China) 2014	No Volleyball Event							
(Argentina) 2018	No Volleyball Event							
Total	0 Titles	0/1						

=== FIVB U19 World Championship ===
Champions Runners up Third place Fourth place

FIVB U19 World Championship
Year	Round	Position	Pld	W	L	SW	SL	Squad
(Brazil) 1989	Didn't qualify							
(Portugal) 1991	Didn't qualify							
(Czechoslovakia) 1993	Didn't qualify							
(France) 1995	Didn't qualify							
(Thailand) 1997	Didn't qualify							
(Portugal) 1999	Didn't qualify							
(Croatia) 2001	Didn't qualify							
(Poland) 2003		13th place						Squad
(Macau) 2005	Didn't qualify							
(Mexico) 2007	Didn't qualify							
(Thailand) 2009	Didn't qualify							
(Turkey) 2011	Didn't qualify							
(Thailand) 2013	Didn't qualify							
(Peru) 2015	Didn't qualify							
(Argentina) 2017	Didn't qualify							
(Egypt) 2019	Didn't qualify							
(Mexico) 2021	Didn't qualify							
Total	0 Titles	1/17						

=== Europe U18 / U17 Championship ===
Champions Runners up Third place Fourth place

Europe U18 / U17 Championship
Year	Round	Position	Pld	W	L	SW	SL	Squad
(Spain) 1995	Didn't qualify							
(Slovakia) 1997	Didn't qualify							
(Poland) 1999	Didn't qualify							
(Czech Republic) 2001	Didn't qualify							
(Croatia) 2003		7th place						Squad
(Estonia) 2005		12th place						Squad
(Czech Republic) 2007	Didn't qualify							
(Netherlands) 2009		7th place						Squad
(Turkey) 2011	Didn't qualify							
(Montenegro) / (Serbia) 2013	Didn't qualify							
(Bulgaria) 2015	Didn't qualify							
(Netherlands) 2017	Didn't qualify							
(Bulgaria) 2018		12th place						Squad
(Montenegro) 2020	Didn't qualify							
(Czech Republic) 2022		10th place						Squad
Total	0 Titles	5/15						

== Team ==
=== Current squad ===
The Following players is the Hungarian players that Competed in the 2018 Girls' U17 Volleyball European Championship

#	Name	Position	Height	Weight	Birthday	Spike	Block
1	boros réka sára	setter	178	60	2002	268	264
2	bakai kata	middle-blocker	186	64	2003	282	270
3	stollár szonja zsófia	outside-spiker	173	53	2003	282	264
4	sziládi viktória adrienn	opposite	175	54	2002	268	260
5	tatár gréta	outside-spiker	176	59	2002	280	222
6	szabó lili	outside-spiker	185	80	2002	280	268
7	rády boglárka ágnes	libero	168	50	2002	256	240
8	vecsey fanni nóra	outside-spiker	179	63	2003	290	270
9	berkó liliána	setter	170	62	2003	264	256
10	boskó ágnes	setter	176	60	2002	278	270
11	manninger luca	outside-spiker	180	73	2002	272	263
12	vincze sára	opposite	176	61	2002	274	258
13	kiss anna laura	opposite	175	65	2003	275	264
14	kertész petra	libero	160	62	2002	254	240
15	kovács evelin dafné	outside-spiker	169	57	2002	267	254
15	orosz bianka evelin	middle-blocker	181	55	2002	275	265
18	domján flóra	libero	169	62	2002	270	263
18	kis dorottya	outside-spiker	175	66	2002	278	266
19	kump alíz	opposite	185	63	2003	278	262
20	araczki gyöngyvér	outside-spiker	173	60	2002	300	284
21	krachler réka	opposite	181	73	2002	275	260
22	karkusz dominika	libero	160	56	2002	260	250
24	szatmári lilla zsófia	outside-spiker	186	68	2002	276	265
