= Poland women's national under-19 volleyball team =

Polish volleyball team

Poland U18
- Association: Polish Volleyball Federation
- Confederation: CEV

Uniforms
Home	Away	Third

FIVB U19 World Championship
- Appearances: 9 (First in 1991)
- Best result: (bronze) Third Place : (2001)

Europe U18 / U17 Championship
- Appearances: 10 (First in 1995)
- Best result: (gold) Champions : (1999, 2013)
- pzps.pl (in Polish)

The Poland women's national under-18 volleyball team represents Poland in international women's volleyball competitions and friendly matches under the age 18 and it is ruled by the Polish Volleyball Federation That is an affiliate of Federation of International Volleyball FIVB and also a part of European Volleyball Confederation CEV.

== Results ==
=== FIVB U19 World Championship ===
Champions Runners up Third place Fourth place

FIVB U19 World Championship
Year	Round	Position	Pld	W	L	SW	SL	Squad
(Brazil) 1989	Didn't Qualify							
(Portugal) 1991		9th place						Squad
(Czechoslovakia) 1993	Didn't Qualify							
(France) 1995	Didn't Qualify							
(Thailand) 1997		7th place						
(Portugal) 1999		4th place						
(Croatia) 2001		Third place						
(Poland) 2003		8th place						
(Macau) 2005	Didn't Qualify							
(Mexico) 2007	Didn't Qualify							
(Thailand) 2009	Didn't Qualify							
(Turkey) 2011		4th place						
(Thailand) 2013		7th place						
(Peru) 2015		8th place						
(Argentina) 2017		16th place						
(Egypt) 2019	Didn't Qualify							
(Mexico) 2021		8th place						
Total	0 Titles	9/17						

=== Europe U18 / U17 Championship ===
Champions Runners up Third place Fourth place

Europe U18 / U17 Championship
Year	Round	Position	Pld	W	L	SW	SL	Squad
(Spain) 1995		6th place						Squad
(Slovakia) 1997		Third place						
(Poland) 1999		Champions						
(Czech Republic) 2001		Runners-Up						
(Croatia) 2003		6th place						
(Estonia) 2005	Didn't Qualify							
(Czech Republic) 2007		11th place						
(Netherlands) 2009	Didn't Qualify							
(Turkey) 2011		5th place						
(Montenegro) / (Serbia) 2013		Champions						
(Bulgaria) 2015		8th place						Squad
(Netherlands) 2017		8th place						Squad
(Bulgaria) 2018	Didn't Qualify							
(Montenegro) 2020		6th place						Squad
Total	2 Titles	10/14						

== Team ==
=== Current squad ===
The following is the Polish roster in the 2017 FIVB Girls' U18 World Championship.

Head coach: Rafal Gasior

No.	Name	Date of birth	Height	Weight	Spike	Block	2017 club
2	Malgorzata Andersohn	4 November 2000	1.70 m (5 ft 7 in)	65 kg (143 lb)	286 cm (113 in)	274 cm (108 in)	(Poland) KS Palac Bydgoszcz
3	Monika Jagla	4 April 2000	1.77 m (5 ft 10 in)	69 kg (152 lb)	298 cm (117 in)	285 cm (112 in)	(Poland) KS Palac Bydgoszcz
4	Julia Szczurowska	29 July 2001	1.88 m (6 ft 2 in)	85 kg (187 lb)	303 cm (119 in)	291 cm (115 in)	(Poland) Mloda Gwardia Wrocław
7	Rozalia Hnatyszyn	17 August 2000	1.85 m (6 ft 1 in)	62 kg (137 lb)	301 cm (119 in)	287 cm (113 in)	(Poland) GEDANIA S.A. Gdańsk
8	Zuzanna Gorecka	10 April 2000	1.81 m (5 ft 11 in)	63 kg (139 lb)	301 cm (119 in)	284 cm (112 in)	(Poland) LTS Legionovia Legionowo
9	Paulina Damaske	1 January 2001	1.78 m (5 ft 10 in)	64 kg (141 lb)	304 cm (120 in)	292 cm (115 in)	(Poland) GEDANIA S.A. Gdańsk
10	Adrianna Rybak	29 September 2000	1.88 m (6 ft 2 in)	72 kg (159 lb)	300 cm (120 in)	287 cm (113 in)	(Poland) GEDANIA S.A. Gdańsk
12	Oliwia Baluk (C)	17 May 2000	1.75 m (5 ft 9 in)	62 kg (137 lb)	288 cm (113 in)	279 cm (110 in)	(Poland) Chemik Police
13	Klaudia Laskowska	23 January 2000	1.88 m (6 ft 2 in)	77 kg (170 lb)	303 cm (119 in)	291 cm (115 in)	(Poland) KS Palac Bydgoszcz
14	Paulina Zaborowska	7 June 2000	1.79 m (5 ft 10 in)	66 kg (146 lb)	290 cm (110 in)	271 cm (107 in)	(Poland) LTS Legionovia Legionowo
16	Julia Mazur	17 April 2001	1.69 m (5 ft 7 in)	62 kg (137 lb)	286 cm (113 in)	270 cm (110 in)	(Poland) Pomorzanin Szczecin
18	Aleksandra Gryka	6 February 2000	1.90 m (6 ft 3 in)	71 kg (157 lb)	302 cm (119 in)	278 cm (109 in)	(Poland) LTS Legionovia Legionowo

== See also ==
- Poland women's team
- Poland women's U18 team
- Poland women's U20 team
- Poland women's U23 team
- Poland men's team
