= 2005 Girls' Youth European Volleyball Championship =

Tournament details
- Host country: Estonia
- Dates: 29 March – 3 April 2005
- Teams: 12
- Venues: 2 (in 1 host city)

Final positions
- Champions: Ukraine (1st title)

Tournament awards
- MVP: (Ukraine) Olha Savenchuk

The 2005 Girls' Youth European Volleyball Championship was the 6th edition of the competition, with the main phase (contested between 12 teams) held in Estonia from 29 March to 3 April 2005.

== Qualification ==
Means of qualification		Qualifier
Host Country		Estonia
Winner of 2003 tournament		Croatia
Qualification Round	Pool A	Turkey
Qualification Round	Pool A	Italy
Qualification Round	Pool B	Austria
Qualification Round	Pool B	Serbia and Montenegro
Qualification Round	Pool C	Russia
Qualification Round	Pool C	Hungary
Qualification Round	Pool D	Ukraine
Qualification Round	Pool D	Germany
Qualification Round	Pool E	Czech Republic
Qualification Round	Pool E	Belarus

== Preliminary round ==
=== Pool A ===
Pos	Team	Pld	W	L	Pts	SW	SL	SR	SPW	SPL	SPR	Qualification
1	Italy	2	2	0	4	6	0	MAX	150	97	1.546	Quarterfinals
2	Russia	2	1	1	3	3	3	1.000	134	133	1.008	Quarterfinals
3	Estonia	2	0	2	2	0	6	0.000	99	153	0.647	9th–12th semifinals

Date	Time		Score		Set 1	Set 2	Set 3	Set 4	Set 5	Total	Report
29 Mar	17:00	Russia	0–3	Italy	20–25	18–25	18–25			56–75	Report
30 Mar	17:00	Estonia	0–3	Russia	18–25	26–28	14–25			58–78	Report
31 Mar	17:00	Italy	3–0	Estonia	25–14	25–13	25–14			75–41	Report

=== Pool B ===
Pos	Team	Pld	W	L	Pts	SW	SL	SR	SPW	SPL	SPR	Qualification
1	Germany	2	2	0	4	6	0	MAX	153	127	1.205	Quarterfinals
2	Czech Republic	2	1	1	3	3	5	0.600	173	182	0.951	Quarterfinals
3	Serbia and Montenegro	2	0	2	2	2	6	0.333	163	180	0.906	9th–12th semifinals

Date	Time		Score		Set 1	Set 2	Set 3	Set 4	Set 5	Total	Report
29 Mar	14:30	Serbia and Montenegro	0–3	Germany	17–25	21–25	21–25			59–75	Report
30 Mar	12:00	Czech Republic	3–2	Serbia and Montenegro	19–25	25–17	18–25	28–26	15–11	105–104	Report
31 Mar	19:30	Germany	3–0	Czech Republic	25–21	28–26	25–21			78–68	Report

=== Pool C ===
Pos	Team	Pld	W	L	Pts	SW	SL	SR	SPW	SPL	SPR	Qualification
1	Croatia	2	2	0	4	6	0	MAX	155	123	1.260	Quarterfinals
2	Belarus	2	1	1	3	3	3	1.000	139	139	1.000	Quarterfinals
3	Turkey	2	0	2	2	0	6	0.000	118	150	0.787	9th–12th semifinals

Date	Time		Score		Set 1	Set 2	Set 3	Set 4	Set 5	Total	Report
29 Mar	19:30	Turkey	0–3	Belarus	19–25	18–25	22–25			59–75	Report
30 Mar	19:30	Croatia	3–0	Turkey	25–18	25–19	25–22			75–59	Report
31 Mar	14:30	Belarus	0–3	Croatia	28–30	20–25	16–25			64–80	Report

=== Pool D ===
Pos	Team	Pld	W	L	Pts	SW	SL	SR	SPW	SPL	SPR	Qualification
1	Ukraine	2	2	0	4	6	0	MAX	150	112	1.339	Quarterfinals
2	Austria	2	1	1	3	3	5	0.600	162	170	0.953	Quarterfinals
3	Hungary	2	0	2	2	2	6	0.333	151	181	0.834	9th–12th semifinals

Date	Time		Score		Set 1	Set 2	Set 3	Set 4	Set 5	Total	Report
29 Mar	12:00	Ukraine	3–0	Hungary	25–17	25–17	25–22			75–56	Report
30 Mar	14:30	Austria	0–3	Ukraine	16–25	21–25	19–25			56–75	Report
31 Mar	12:00	Hungary	2–3	Austria	15–25	17–25	25–18	25–23	13–15	95–106	Report

== 9th–12th classification ==
Semifinals
1 April
Estonia	0
Serbia and Montenegro	3
1 April
Turkey	3
Hungary	1

9th place match
2 April
Serbia and Montenegro	3
Turkey	2
11th place match
2 April
Estonia	3
Hungary	2

=== 9th–12th semifinals ===
Date	Time		Score		Set 1	Set 2	Set 3	Set 4	Set 5	Total	Report
1 Apr	15:00	Estonia	0–3	Serbia and Montenegro	17–25	17–25	9–25			43–75	Report
1 Apr	18:00	Turkey	3–1	Hungary	22–25	25–18	25–18	25–17		97–78	Report

=== 11th place match ===
Date	Time		Score		Set 1	Set 2	Set 3	Set 4	Set 5	Total	Report
2 Apr	15:00	Estonia	3–2	Hungary	19–25	27–25	19–25	25–14	15–13	105–102	Report

=== 9th place match ===
Date	Time		Score		Set 1	Set 2	Set 3	Set 4	Set 5	Total	Report
2 Apr	18:00	Serbia and Montenegro	3–2	Turkey	22–25	20–25	25–16	25–18	15–13	107–97	Report

== Final round ==
5th place match
3 April
Belarus	0
Germany	3
7th place match
3 April
Czech Republic	0
Austria	3

5th–8th semifinals
2 April
Czech Republic	0
Belarus	3
2 April
Austria	1
Germany	3

Quarterfinals
1 April
Italy	3
Czech Republic	1
1 April
Ukraine	3
Belarus	0
1 April
Croatia	3
Austria	0
1 April
Germany	0
Russia	3

Semifinals
2 April
Italy	1
Ukraine	3
2 April
Croatia	2
Russia	3

Final
3 April
Ukraine	3
Russia	2
3rd place match
3 April
Italy	3
Croatia	1

=== Quarterfinals ===
Date	Time		Score		Set 1	Set 2	Set 3	Set 4	Set 5	Total	Report
1 Apr	12:00	Italy	3–1	Czech Republic	25–18	25–12	26–28	25–17		101–75	Report
1 Apr	14:30	Croatia	3–0	Austria	25–13	26–24	25–20			76–57	Report
1 Apr	17:00	Germany	0–3	Russia	23–25	23–25	16–25			62–75	Report
1 Apr	19:30	Ukraine	3–0	Belarus	25–21	25–22	25–23			75–66	Report

=== 5th–8th semifinals ===
Date	Time		Score		Set 1	Set 2	Set 3	Set 4	Set 5	Total	Report
2 Apr	12:00	Czech Republic	0–3	Belarus	15–25	18–25	21–25			54–75	Report
2 Apr	14:30	Germany	3–1	Austria	19–25	25–23	25–18	25–15		94–81	Report

=== Semifinals ===
Date	Time		Score		Set 1	Set 2	Set 3	Set 4	Set 5	Total	Report
2 Apr	17:00	Italy	1–3	Ukraine	25–20	24–26	20–25	18–25		87–96	Report
2 Apr	19:30	Russia	3–2	Croatia	25–18	21–25	25–18	17–25	21–19	109–105	Report

=== 7th place match ===
Date	Time		Score		Set 1	Set 2	Set 3	Set 4	Set 5	Total	Report
3 Apr	12:00	Czech Republic	0–3	Austria	23–25	23–25	24–26			70–76	Report

=== 5th place match ===
Date	Time		Score		Set 1	Set 2	Set 3	Set 4	Set 5	Total	Report
3 Apr	15:00	Belarus	0–3	Germany	23–25	22–25	22–25			67–75	Report

=== 3rd place match ===
Date	Time		Score		Set 1	Set 2	Set 3	Set 4	Set 5	Total	Report
3 Apr	15:30	Italy	3–1	Croatia	25–22	20–25	25–22	25–22		95–91	Report

=== Final ===
Date	Time		Score		Set 1	Set 2	Set 3	Set 4	Set 5	Total	Report
3 Apr	18:00	Ukraine	3–2	Russia	20–25	17–25	25–19	26–24	15–9	103–102	Report

== Final standing ==
Rank	Team
1st place, gold medalist(s)	Ukraine
2nd place, silver medalist(s)	Russia
3rd place, bronze medalist(s)	Italy
4	Croatia
5	Germany
6	Belarus
7	Austria
8	Czech Republic
9	Serbia and Montenegro
10	Turkey
11	Estonia
12	Hungary

Qualified for the 2005 Girls' U18 World Championship

== Awards ==
- Most valuable player
  (Ukraine) Olha Savenchuk
- Best attacker
  (Ukraine) Olha Savenchuk
- Best server
  (Croatia) Jelena Alajbeg
- Best blocker
  (Russia) Natalia Dianskaya
- Best setter
  (Croatia) Ana Grbac
- Best libero
  (Russia) Alexandra Vinogradova
- Best receiver
  (Italy) Lucia Bosetti
