= 2003 FIVB Volleyball Girls' U18 World Championship =

2003 FIVB Girls Youth World Championship
Tournament details
- Host country: Poland
- Dates: 9–17 August 2003
- Teams: 16
- Venues: 2 (in Piła and Włocławek host cities)

Final positions
- Champions: China (2nd title)
- Runners-up: Italy
- Third place: Brazil
- Fourth place: United States

Tournament awards
- MVP: Senna Ušić (CRO)

The 2003 FIVB Girls Youth Volleyball World Championship was held in Piła and Włocławek, Poland from 9 to 17 August 2003. 16 teams participated in the tournament.

== Qualification process ==
Confederation	Method of Qualification	Date	Venue	Vacancies	Qualified
FIVB	Host			1	Poland
CSV	2002 South American Youth Championship	May 8 – 12, 2002	Barquisimeto, Venezuela	2	Brazil; Venezuela
NORCECA	2002 NORCECA Youth Championship	August 1 – 5, 2002	Salt Lake City, United States	1	United States
CAVB	2002 African Youth Championship	2002		2	Kenya; Egypt
AVC	2003 Asian Youth Championship	April 20 – 27, 2003	Sisaket, Thailand	3	China; Thailand; Chinese Taipei*
CEV	2003 European Youth Championship	April 22 – 27, 2003	Zagreb, Croatia	7	Croatia; Italy; Serbia and Montenegro; Russia; Hungary; Belarus; Czech Republic**
Total				16	

- * Chinese Taipei replaced North Korea.
- ** Czech Republic replaced Germany.

== Pools composition ==
Pool A	Pool B	Pool C	Pool D
Croatia; Kenya; Serbia and Montenegro; Venezuela	Egypt; Poland; Russia; Thailand	China; Chinese Taipei; Hungary; Italy	Brazil; Belarus; Czech Republic; United States

== First round ==
=== Pool A ===
Pos	Team	Pld	W	L	Pts	SW	SL	SR	SPW	SPL	SPR	Qualification
1	Croatia	3	3	0	6	9	0	MAX	225	144	1.563	Seeding group
2	Serbia and Montenegro	3	2	1	5	6	3	2.000	209	159	1.314	Elimination group
3	Venezuela	3	1	2	4	3	7	0.429	202	215	0.940	Elimination group
4	Kenya	3	0	3	3	1	9	0.111	130	248	0.524	Eliminated

Date		Score		Set 1	Set 2	Set 3	Set 4	Set 5	Total
9 Aug	Kenya	0–3	Serbia and Montenegro	12–25	11–25	7–25			30–75
9 Aug	Croatia	3–0	Venezuela	25–14	25–17	25–19			75–50
10 Aug	Serbia and Montenegro	3–0	Venezuela	25–17	25–15	25–22			75–54
10 Aug	Kenya	0–3	Croatia	11–25	10–25	14–25			35–75
11 Aug	Croatia	3–0	Serbia and Montenegro	25–22	25–17	25–20			75–59
11 Aug	Venezuela	3–1	Kenya	23–25	25–11	25–15	25–14		98–65

=== Pool B ===
Pos	Team	Pld	W	L	Pts	SW	SL	SR	SPW	SPL	SPR	Qualification
1	Russia	3	3	0	6	9	2	4.500	268	182	1.473	Seeding group
2	Poland	3	2	1	5	7	5	1.400	247	241	1.025	Elimination group
3	Thailand	3	1	2	4	6	7	0.857	273	257	1.062	Elimination group
4	Egypt	3	0	3	3	1	9	0.111	138	246	0.561	Eliminated

Date		Score		Set 1	Set 2	Set 3	Set 4	Set 5	Total
9 Aug	Russia	3–0	Egypt	25–12	25–16	25–11			75–39
9 Aug	Poland	3–2	Thailand	25–23	25–19	14–25	22–25	15–13	101–105
10 Aug	Thailand	1–3	Russia	14–25	19–25	26–24	13–25		72–99
10 Aug	Egypt	0–3	Poland	7–25	21–25	14–25			42–75
11 Aug	Thailand	3–1	Egypt	25–8	25–15	21–25	25–9		96–57
11 Aug	Russia	3–1	Poland	25–12	25–22	19–25	25–12		94–71

=== Pool C ===
Pos	Team	Pld	W	L	Pts	SW	SL	SR	SPW	SPL	SPR	Qualification
1	China	3	3	0	6	9	2	4.500	254	212	1.198	Seeding group
2	Italy	3	2	1	5	8	4	2.000	278	220	1.264	Elimination group
3	Chinese Taipei	3	1	2	4	4	6	0.667	204	235	0.868	Elimination group
4	Hungary	3	0	3	3	0	9	0.000	156	225	0.693	Eliminated

Date		Score		Set 1	Set 2	Set 3	Set 4	Set 5	Total
9 Aug	Chinese Taipei	1–3	Italy	13–25	26–24	15–25	13–25		67–99
9 Aug	China	3–0	Hungary	25–10	25–14	25–22			75–46
10 Aug	China	3–0	Chinese Taipei	25–23	25–15	26–24			76–62
10 Aug	Hungary	0–3	Italy	12–25	19–25	19–25			50–75
11 Aug	Italy	2–3	China	25–22	25–12	17–25	27–29	10–15	104–103
11 Aug	Chinese Taipei	3–0	Hungary	25–15	25–23	25–22			75–60

=== Pool D ===
Pos	Team	Pld	W	L	Pts	SW	SL	SR	SPW	SPL	SPR	Qualification
1	Brazil	3	3	0	6	9	0	MAX	230	151	1.523	Seeding group
2	United States	3	2	1	5	6	4	1.500	226	209	1.081	Elimination group
3	Czech Republic	3	1	2	4	4	8	0.500	257	286	0.899	Elimination group
4	Belarus	3	0	3	3	2	9	0.222	196	263	0.745	Eliminated

Date		Score		Set 1	Set 2	Set 3	Set 4	Set 5	Total
9 Aug	Belarus	0–3	Brazil	15–25	14–25	5–25			34–75
9 Aug	Czech Republic	1–3	United States	25–22	24–26	20–25	11–25		80–98
10 Aug	Brazil	3–0	United States	25–14	25–17	25–22			75–53
10 Aug	Belarus	2–3	Czech Republic	23–25	25–23	20–25	25–23	15–17	108–113
11 Aug	Czech Republic	0–3	Brazil	28–30	21–25	15–25			64–80
11 Aug	United States	3–0	Belarus	25–22	25–22	25–10			75–54

== Second round ==
=== Play off – elimination group ===
Date		Score		Set 1	Set 2	Set 3	Set 4	Set 5	Total
13 Aug	Serbia and Montenegro	2–3	Thailand	16–25	25–22	18–25	25–20	13–15	97–107
13 Aug	Venezuela	0–3	United States	12–25	21–25	18–25			51–75
13 Aug	Chinese Taipei	1–3	Poland	19–25	22–25	25–22	17–25		83–97
13 Aug	Italy	3–2	Czech Republic	25–23	19–25	25–21	20–25	15–6	104–100

=== Play off – seeding group ===
Date		Score		Set 1	Set 2	Set 3	Set 4	Set 5	Total
13 Aug	Brazil	3–2	Croatia	25–16	25–18	19–25	23–25	15–12	107–96
13 Aug	Russia	3–2	China	25–27	25–19	25–19	22–25	16–14	113–104

== Final round ==
Quarterfinals
15 August – Piła
Russia	2
United States	3
15 August – Piła
Italy	3
Croatia	2
15 August – Piła
Thailand	1
Brazil	3
15 August – Piła
China	3
Poland	0

Semifinals
16 August – Piła
United States	0
Italy	3
16 August – Piła
China	3
Brazil	2

Final
17 August – Piła
Italy	2
China	3
3rd place
17 August – Piła
United States	1
Brazil	3

5th–8th places
16 August – Piła
Russia	0
Croatia	3
16 August – Piła
Poland	1
Thailand	3

5th place
17 August – Piła
Croatia	3
Thailand	0
7th place
17 August – Piła
Russia	3
Poland	1

=== Quarterfinals ===
Date		Score		Set 1	Set 2	Set 3	Set 4	Set 5	Total
15 Aug	Russia	2–3	United States	20–25	16–25	25–19	25–20	16–18	102–107
15 Aug	Italy	3–2	Croatia	19–25	28–26	23–25	25–19	15–13	110–108
15 Aug	Thailand	1–3	Brazil	20–25	25–21	21–25	26–28		92–99
15 Aug	China	3–0	Poland	25–19	25–20	25–10			75–49

=== 5th–8th semifinals ===
Date		Score		Set 1	Set 2	Set 3	Set 4	Set 5	Total
16 Aug	Russia	0–3	Croatia	26–28	11–25	21–25			58–78
16 Aug	Poland	1–3	Thailand	21–25	25–18	22–25	23–25		91–93

=== Semifinals ===
Date		Score		Set 1	Set 2	Set 3	Set 4	Set 5	Total
16 Aug	Russia	0–3	Croatia	26–28	11–25	21–25			58–78
16 Aug	Poland	1–3	Thailand	21–25	25–18	22–25	23–25		91–93

=== 7th place ===
Date		Score		Set 1	Set 2	Set 3	Set 4	Set 5	Total
17 Aug	Russia	3–1	Poland	25–23	25–21	16–25	25–18		91–87

=== 5th place ===
Date		Score		Set 1	Set 2	Set 3	Set 4	Set 5	Total
17 Aug	Croatia	3–1	Thailand	26–28	25–17	25–14	25–16		101–75

=== 3rd place ===
Date		Score		Set 1	Set 2	Set 3	Set 4	Set 5	Total
17 Aug	United States	1–3	Brazil	25–16	16–25	20–25	18–25		79–91

=== Final ===
Date		Score		Set 1	Set 2	Set 3	Set 4	Set 5	Total
17 Aug	Italy	2–3	China	25–17	25–15	23–25	16–25	8–15	97–97

== Final standing ==
Rank	Team
1st place, gold medalist(s)	China
2nd place, silver medalist(s)	Italy
3rd place, bronze medalist(s)	Brazil
4	United States
5	Croatia
6	Thailand
7	Russia
8	Poland
9	Chinese Taipei
9	Czech Republic
9	Serbia and Montenegro
9	Venezuela
13	Belarus
13	Egypt
13	Hungary
13	Kenya

2003 FIVB Girls Youth World champions

China
2nd title

12–woman Roster
Yang Dan, Chen Yina, Wang Chen, Ma Xiaoying, Zhou Runzhi, Wang Lin, Pan Hong, Ma Yunwen, Wang Nan, Yang Yanan, Chen Yao and Wei Qiuyue
Head coach
Lin Nan

== Individual awards ==
- Most valuable player
  - Senna Ušić (CRO)
- Best scorer
  - Jordan Larson (USA)
- Best spiker
  - Yang Yanan (CHN)
- Best blocker
  - Adenizia Silva (BRA)
- Best digger
  - Marina Ballarini (ITA)
- Best setter
  - Anna Manikowska (POL)
- Best receiver
  - Senna Ušić (CRO)
