= 1997 Girls' Youth European Volleyball Championship =

Tournament details
- Host country: Slovakia
- Dates: 25 – 30 March 1997
- Teams: 8
- Venues: 2 (in 2 host cities)

Final positions
- Champions: Russia (1st title)

Tournament awards
- MVP: (Croatia) Ingrid Siscovich

The 1997 Girls' Youth European Volleyball Championship was the 2nd edition of the competition, with the main phase (contested between 8 teams) held in Slovakia from 25 to 30 March 1997.

== Venues ==
Pool I		Pool II, Classification matches, Final Round	
Považská Bystrica, Slovakia	Považská Bystrica is located in Slovakia	Púchov, Slovakia	Púchov is located in Slovakia

== Preliminary round ==
=== Pool I ===
Pos	Team	Pld	W	L	Pts	SW	SL	SR	SPW	SPL	SPR	Qualification
1	Ukraine	3	3	0	6	9	5	1.800	173	149	1.161	Semifinals
2	Poland	3	2	1	5	8	5	1.600	170	154	1.104	Semifinals
3	Italy	3	1	2	4	6	6	1.000	140	125	1.120	5th–8th Semifinals
4	Belarus	3	0	3	3	2	9	0.222	105	160	0.656	5th–8th Semifinals

Date	Time		Score		Set 1	Set 2	Set 3	Set 4	Set 5	Total	Report
25 Mar		Ukraine	3–1	Belarus	15–10	10–15	15–8	15–2		55–35	Report
25 Mar		Poland	3–1	Italy	7–15	15–8	15–10	15–6		52–39	Report
26 Mar		Ukraine	3–2	Italy	8–15	5–15	15–10	15–10	15–6	58–56	Report
26 Mar		Poland	3–1	Belarus	13–15	15–13	15–11	17–16		60–55	Report
27 Mar		Ukraine	3–2	Poland	16–14	6–15	15–5	8–15	15–9	60–58	Report
27 Mar		Italy	3–0	Belarus	15–4	15–6	15–5			45–15	Report

=== Pool II ===
Pos	Team	Pld	W	L	Pts	SW	SL	SR	SPW	SPL	SPR	Qualification
1	Russia	3	3	0	6	9	5	1.800	191	172	1.110	Semifinals
2	Croatia	3	2	1	5	8	4	2.000	160	138	1.159	Semifinals
3	Slovakia	3	1	2	4	4	7	0.571	133	135	0.985	5th–8th Semifinals
4	Czech Republic	3	0	3	3	4	9	0.444	145	184	0.788	5th–8th Semifinals

Date	Time		Score		Set 1	Set 2	Set 3	Set 4	Set 5	Total	Report
25 Mar		Croatia	3–0	Slovakia	15–7	15–7	15–12			45–26	Report
25 Mar		Russia	3–2	Czech Republic	14–16	15–6	13–15	16–14	15–10	73–61	Report
26 Mar		Russia	3–2	Croatia	15–10	9–15	15–12	11–15	15–9	65–61	Report
26 Mar		Slovakia	3–1	Czech Republic	15–7	15–4	12–15	15–11		57–37	Report
27 Mar		Croatia	3–1	Czech Republic	15–12	9–15	15–12	15–8		54–47	Report
27 Mar		Russia	3–1	Slovakia	16–14	17–16	5–15	15–5		53–50	Report

== 5th–8th classification ==
Semifinals
29 March
Italy	3
Czech Republic	1
29 March
Belarus	3
Slovakia	0

5th place match
30 March
Italy	3
Belarus	1
7th place match
30 March
Slovakia	3
Czech Republic	0

=== 5th–8th Semifinals ===
Date	Time		Score		Set 1	Set 2	Set 3	Set 4	Set 5	Total	Report
29 Mar		Italy	3–1	Czech Republic	15–12	7–15	15–7	15–12		52–46	Report
29 Mar		Belarus	3–0	Slovakia	15–13	15–4	15–5			45–22	Report

=== 7th place match ===
Date	Time		Score		Set 1	Set 2	Set 3	Set 4	Set 5	Total	Report
30 Mar		Slovakia	3–0	Czech Republic	15–9	15–10	15–7			45–26	Report

=== 5th place match ===
Date	Time		Score		Set 1	Set 2	Set 3	Set 4	Set 5	Total	Report
30 Mar		Italy	3–1	Belarus	8–15	16–14	15–5	15–4		54–38	Report

== Final round ==
Semifinals
29 March
Croatia	3
Ukraine	2
29 March
Russia	3
Poland	1

Final
30 March
Russia	3
Croatia	1
3rd place match
30 March
Poland	3
Ukraine	0

=== Semifinals ===
Date	Time		Score		Set 1	Set 2	Set 3	Set 4	Set 5	Total	Report
29 Mar		Croatia	3–2	Ukraine	15–13	6–15	12–15	15–10	15–8	63–61	Report
29 Mar		Russia	3–1	Poland	11–15	15–2	15–11	15–12		56–40	Report

=== 3rd place match ===
Date	Time		Score		Set 1	Set 2	Set 3	Set 4	Set 5	Total	Report
30 Mar		Poland	3–0	Ukraine	15–10	15–6	15–6			45–22	Report

=== Final ===
Date	Time		Score		Set 1	Set 2	Set 3	Set 4	Set 5	Total	Report
30 Mar		Russia	3–1	Croatia	15–8	2–15	15–13	15–9		47–45	Report

== Final standing ==
Rank	Team
1st place, gold medalist(s)	Russia
2nd place, silver medalist(s)	Croatia
3rd place, bronze medalist(s)	Poland
4	Ukraine
5	Italy
6	Belarus
7	Slovakia
8	Czech Republic

Qualified for the 1997 Girls' U18 World Championship

== Individual awards ==
- Most Valuable Player: Ingrid Siscovich (CRO)
