= 2003 Girls' Youth European Volleyball Championship =

Tournament details
- Host country: Croatia
- Dates: 22 – 27 April 2003
- Teams: 8
- Venue: 1 (in 1 host city)

Final positions
- Champions: Croatia (1st title)

Tournament awards
- MVP: (Croatia) Senna Ušić

The 2003 Girls' Youth European Volleyball Championship was the 5th edition of the competition, with the main phase (contested between 8 teams) held in Croatia from 22 to 27 April 2003.

== Qualification ==
Means of qualification		Qualifier
Host Country		Croatia
Winner of 2001 tournament		Italy
Qualification Round	Pool A	Poland
Qualification Round	Pool B	Belarus
Qualification Round	Pool C	Germany
Qualification Round	Pool D	Russia
Qualification Round	Pool E	Hungary
Qualification Round	Pool F	Serbia and Montenegro

== Venues ==
All matches
Zagreb, Croatia	Zagreb is located in Croatia
Zrinjevac Sport Hall	Zagreb is located in Croatia
Capacity: 1,160	Zagreb is located in Croatia

== Preliminary round ==
=== Pool I ===
Pos	Team	Pld	W	L	Pts	SW	SL	SR	SPW	SPL	SPR	Qualification
1	Italy	3	3	0	6	9	3	3.000	263	237	1.110	Semifinals
2	Russia	3	2	1	5	8	3	2.667	248	184	1.348	Semifinals
3	Belarus	3	1	2	4	4	7	0.571	223	248	0.899	5th–8th semifinals
4	Hungary	3	0	3	3	1	9	0.111	179	250	0.716	5th–8th semifinals

Date	Time		Score		Set 1	Set 2	Set 3	Set 4	Set 5	Total	Report
22 Apr	11:30	Hungary	0–3	Russia	20–25	9–25	20–25			49–75	Report
22 Apr	16:30	Italy	3–1	Belarus	25–21	18–25	25–22	25–21		93–89	Report
23 Apr	11:30	Italy	3–0	Hungary	25–7	25–17	28–26			78–50	Report
23 Apr	16:30	Belarus	0–3	Russia	16–25	8–25	13–25			37–75	Report
24 Apr	11:30	Russia	2–3	Italy	17–25	21–25	25–21	25–12	10–15	98–98	Report
24 Apr	16:30	Hungary	1–3	Belarus	20–25	25–21	24–26	11–25		80–97	Report

=== Pool II ===
Pos	Team	Pld	W	L	Pts	SW	SL	SR	SPW	SPL	SPR	Qualification
1	Croatia	3	3	0	6	9	0	MAX	225	136	1.654	Semifinals
2	Serbia and Montenegro	3	2	1	5	6	3	2.000	197	186	1.059	Semifinals
3	Germany	3	1	2	4	3	8	0.375	204	241	0.846	5th–8th semifinals
4	Poland	3	0	3	3	2	9	0.222	190	253	0.751	5th–8th semifinals

Date	Time		Score		Set 1	Set 2	Set 3	Set 4	Set 5	Total	Report
22 Apr	14:00	Poland	0–3	Serbia and Montenegro	14–25	23–25	14–25			51–75	Report
22 Apr	19:00	Germany	0–3	Croatia	13–25	16–25	12–25			41–75	Report
23 Apr	14:00	Germany	3–2	Poland	19–25	25–15	25–17	19–25	15–9	103–91	Report
23 Apr	19:00	Croatia	3–0	Serbia and Montenegro	25–12	25–19	25–16			75–47	Report
24 Apr	14:00	Serbia and Montenegro	3–0	Germany	25–23	25–17	25–20			75–60	Report
24 Apr	19:00	Poland	0–3	Croatia	13–25	22–25	13–25			48–75	Report

== 5th–8th classification ==
Semifinals
26 April
Hungary	0
Germany	3
26 April
Belarus	1
Poland	3

5th place match
27 April
Poland	0
Germany	3
7th place match
27 April
Belarus	1
Hungary	3

=== 5th–8th semifinals ===
Date	Time		Score		Set 1	Set 2	Set 3	Set 4	Set 5	Total	Report
26 Apr	11:30	Hungary	0–3	Germany	22–25	24–26	15–25			61–76	Report
26 Apr	14:00	Belarus	1–3	Poland	26–28	25–22	26–28	15–25		92–103	Report

=== 7th place match ===
Date	Time		Score		Set 1	Set 2	Set 3	Set 4	Set 5	Total	Report
27 Apr	10:30	Belarus	1–3	Hungary	25–19	23–25	23–25	19–25		90–94	Report

=== 5th place match ===
Date	Time		Score		Set 1	Set 2	Set 3	Set 4	Set 5	Total	Report
27 Apr	13:00	Poland	0–3	Germany	20–25	22–25	20–25			62–75	Report

== Final round ==
Semifinals
26 April
Russia	1
Croatia	3
26 April
Italy	3
Serbia and Montenegro	0

Final
27 April
Italy	0
Croatia	3
3rd place match
27 April
Serbia and Montenegro	3
Russia	1

=== Semifinals ===
Date	Time		Score		Set 1	Set 2	Set 3	Set 4	Set 5	Total	Report
26 Apr	16:30	Russia	1–3	Croatia	20–25	25–18	20–25	26–28		91–96	Report
26 Apr	19:00	Italy	3–0	Serbia and Montenegro	25–20	25–22	30–28			80–70	Report

=== 3rd place match ===
Date	Time		Score		Set 1	Set 2	Set 3	Set 4	Set 5	Total	Report
27 Apr	15:30	Serbia and Montenegro	3–1	Russia	25–27	25–21	25–17	25–19		100–84	Report

=== Final ===
Date	Time		Score		Set 1	Set 2	Set 3	Set 4	Set 5	Total	Report
27 Apr	18:00	Italy	0–3	Croatia	13–25	14–25	18–25			45–75	Report

== Final standing ==
Rank	Team
1st place, gold medalist(s)	Croatia
2nd place, silver medalist(s)	Italy
3rd place, bronze medalist(s)	Serbia and Montenegro
4	Russia
5	Germany
6	Poland
7	Hungary
8	Belarus

Qualified for the 2003 Girls' U18 World Championship

== Awards ==
- Most valuable player
  (Croatia) Senna Ušić
- Best attacker
  (Italy) Veronica Angeloni
- Best server
  (Serbia and Montenegro) Mirjana Đurić
- Best blocker
  (Italy) Ilaria Garzaro
- Best setter
  (Croatia) Diana Reščić
- Best libero
  (Russia) Ekaterina Kabeshova
- Best receiver
  (Croatia) Senna Ušić
