= 2015 Girls' Youth European Volleyball Championship squads =

This article show all participating team squads at the 2015 Girls' Youth European Volleyball Championship, played by sixteen countries with the final round held in Bulgaria

== Pool A ==
=== Serbia ===
The following is the Serbian roster in the 2015 Girls' Youth European Volleyball Championship.

Head Coach: (Serbia) Jovo Cakovic

| No. | Name | Date of birth | Height | Weight | Spike | Block | Position |
|---|---|---|---|---|---|---|---|
| 2 | Katarina Lazović | 12 September 1999 | 1.75 m (5 ft 9 in) | 50 kg (110 lb) | 270 cm (110 in) | 265 cm (104 in) | Outside-spiker |
| 3 | Ana Martinovic | 7 March 1998 | 1.80 m (5 ft 11 in) | 63 kg (139 lb) | 280 cm (110 in) | 275 cm (108 in) | Outside-spiker |
| 4 | Ana Jakšić | 10 March 1998 | 1.78 m (5 ft 10 in) | 64 kg (141 lb) | 285 cm (112 in) | 280 cm (110 in) | Setter |
| 5 | Tijana Milojevic | 10 September 1998 | 1.71 m (5 ft 7 in) | 53 kg (117 lb) | 270 cm (110 in) | 265 cm (104 in) | Libero |
| 6 | Ljubica Milojevic | 13 February 1999 | 1.90 m (6 ft 3 in) | 72 kg (159 lb) | 300 cm (120 in) | 287 cm (113 in) | Middle-blocker |
| 7 | Jovana Kocić | 24 February 1998 | 1.85 m (6 ft 1 in) | 64 kg (141 lb) | 290 cm (110 in) | 285 cm (112 in) | Middle-blocker |
| 8 | Anastasija Sekulic | 31 July 1999 | 1.80 m (5 ft 11 in) | 58 kg (128 lb) | 280 cm (110 in) | 270 cm (110 in) | Outside-spiker |
| 9 | Tamara Radmilović | 9 June 1999 | 1.84 m (6 ft 0 in) | 64 kg (141 lb) | 280 cm (110 in) | 275 cm (108 in) | Middle-blocker |
| 10 | Anđela Veselinović | 5 February 1999 | 1.73 m (5 ft 8 in) | 55 kg (121 lb) | 270 cm (110 in) | 265 cm (104 in) | Setter |
| 11 | Milica Tasic | 24 December 1999 | 1.83 m (6 ft 0 in) | 62 kg (137 lb) | 285 cm (112 in) | 280 cm (110 in) | Outside-spiker |
| 14 | Anja Asonja | 4 October 1999 | 1.90 m (6 ft 3 in) | 75 kg (165 lb) | 290 cm (110 in) | 285 cm (112 in) | Opposite |
| 17 | Tijana Stojkovic | 3 September 1999 | 1.84 m (6 ft 0 in) | 58 kg (128 lb) | 295 cm (116 in) | 280 cm (110 in) | Opposite |

=== Russia ===
The following is the Russian roster in the 2015 Girls' Youth European Volleyball Championship.

Head Coach: (Russia) Svetlana Safronova

| No. | Name | Date of birth | Height | Weight | Spike | Block | Position |
|---|---|---|---|---|---|---|---|
| 1 | Angelina Lazarenko | 13 April 1998 | 1.92 m (6 ft 4 in) | 76 kg (168 lb) | 317 cm (125 in) | 298 cm (117 in) | Middle-blocker |
| 2 | Ksenia Smirnova | 24 April 1998 | 1.86 m (6 ft 1 in) | 73 kg (161 lb) | 300 cm (120 in) | 291 cm (115 in) | Opposite |
| 3 | Inna Balyko | 16 July 1998 | 1.83 m (6 ft 0 in) | 68 kg (150 lb) | 295 cm (116 in) | 288 cm (113 in) | Setter |
| 5 | Anastasia Stalnaya | 1 June 1998 | 1.88 m (6 ft 2 in) | 71 kg (157 lb) | 306 cm (120 in) | 298 cm (117 in) | Outside-spiker |
| 6 | Elizaveta Kotova | 31 May 1998 | 1.85 m (6 ft 1 in) | 77 kg (170 lb) | 298 cm (117 in) | 283 cm (111 in) | Middle-blocker |
| 8 | Anastasiia Maksimova | 23 May 1998 | 1.67 m (5 ft 6 in) | 57 kg (126 lb) | 262 cm (103 in) | 213 cm (84 in) | Libero |
| 9 | Ksenia Pligunova | 24 March 1998 | 1.80 m (5 ft 11 in) | 68 kg (150 lb) | 292 cm (115 in) | 286 cm (113 in) | Middle-blocker |
| 10 | Angelina Emelina | 10 June 1998 | 1.86 m (6 ft 1 in) | 81 kg (179 lb) | 301 cm (119 in) | 290 cm (110 in) | Outside-spiker |
| 12 | Daria Ryseva | 5 March 1998 | 1.75 m (5 ft 9 in) | 69 kg (152 lb) | 289 cm (114 in) | 285 cm (112 in) | Setter |
| 15 | Olesya Ivanova | 16 April 1998 | 1.85 m (6 ft 1 in) | 75 kg (165 lb) | 310 cm (120 in) | 297 cm (117 in) | Opposite |
| 16 | Maria Vorobyeva | 24 February 1998 | 1.83 m (6 ft 0 in) | 71 kg (157 lb) | 306 cm (120 in) | 296 cm (117 in) | Outside-spiker |
| 19 | Aleksandra Oganezova | 12 May 1998 | 1.68 m (5 ft 6 in) | 60 kg (130 lb) | 270 cm (110 in) | 260 cm (100 in) | Libero |

=== Italy ===
The following is the Italian roster in the 2015 Girls' Youth European Volleyball Championship.

Head Coach: (Italy) Marco Mencarelli

| No. | Name | Date of birth | Height | Weight | Spike | Block | Position |
|---|---|---|---|---|---|---|---|
| 1 | Roberta Carraro | 17 November 1998 | 1.81 m (5 ft 11 in) | 68 kg (150 lb) | 290 cm (110 in) | 282 cm (111 in) | Setter |
| 2 | Marta Masiero | 7 May 1998 | 1.76 m (5 ft 9 in) | 59 kg (130 lb) | 300 cm (120 in) | 286 cm (113 in) | Opposite |
| 3 | Giulia Bartesaghi | 5 September 1998 | 1.88 m (6 ft 2 in) | 70 kg (150 lb) | 308 cm (121 in) | 292 cm (115 in) | Outside-spiker |
| 5 | Marina Lubian | 11 April 2000 | 1.87 m (6 ft 2 in) | 66 kg (146 lb) | 300 cm (120 in) | 284 cm (112 in) | Middle-blocker |
| 6 | Giorgia Zannoni | 11 February 1998 | 1.75 m (5 ft 9 in) | 67 kg (148 lb) | 284 cm (112 in) | 270 cm (110 in) | Libero |
| 8 | Alessia Orro | 18 July 1998 | 1.77 m (5 ft 10 in) | 74 kg (163 lb) | 306 cm (120 in) | 282 cm (111 in) | Setter |
| 9 | Beatrice Tenti | 4 October 1999 | 1.88 m (6 ft 2 in) | 66 kg (146 lb) | 304 cm (120 in) | 284 cm (112 in) | Outside-spiker |
| 10 | Alice Pamio | 15 January 1998 | 1.79 m (5 ft 10 in) | 66 kg (146 lb) | 302 cm (119 in) | 278 cm (109 in) | Outside-spiker |
| 11 | Giulia Mancini | 5 March 1998 | 1.83 m (6 ft 0 in) | 68 kg (150 lb) | 302 cm (119 in) | 282 cm (111 in) | Middle-blocker |
| 12 | Alessia Mazzaro | 19 September 1998 | 1.84 m (6 ft 0 in) | 64 kg (141 lb) | 302 cm (119 in) | 284 cm (112 in) | Middle-blocker |
| 14 | Paola Egonu | 18 December 1998 | 1.91 m (6 ft 3 in) | 78 kg (172 lb) | 332 cm (131 in) | 312 cm (123 in) | Outside-spiker |
| 19 | Vittoria Piani | 12 February 1998 | 1.87 m (6 ft 2 in) | 76 kg (168 lb) | 316 cm (124 in) | 296 cm (117 in) | Opposite |

=== Germany ===
The following is the German roster in the 2015 Girls' Youth European Volleyball Championship.

Head Coach: (Germany) Jens Tietböhl

| No. | Name | Date of birth | Height | Weight | Spike | Block | Position |
|---|---|---|---|---|---|---|---|
| 1 | Vanessa Agbortabi | 4 December 1998 | 1.80 m (5 ft 11 in) | 65 kg (143 lb) | 298 cm (117 in) | 283 cm (111 in) | Outside-spiker |
| 2 | Pia Kastner | 29 June 1998 | 1.82 m (6 ft 0 in) | 68 kg (150 lb) | 297 cm (117 in) | 286 cm (113 in) | Setter |
| 3 | Maike Henning | 19 June 1999 | 1.76 m (5 ft 9 in) | 69 kg (152 lb) | 290 cm (110 in) | 278 cm (109 in) | Libero |
| 4 | Gina Köppen | 4 December 1998 | 1.87 m (6 ft 2 in) | 69 kg (152 lb) | 295 cm (116 in) | 284 cm (112 in) | Opposite |
| 5 | Sabrina Krause | 18 December 1998 | 1.96 m (6 ft 5 in) | 71 kg (157 lb) | 307 cm (121 in) | 295 cm (116 in) | Middle-blocker |
| 7 | Pia Leweling | 4 January 1998 | 1.82 m (6 ft 0 in) | 67 kg (148 lb) | 295 cm (116 in) | 282 cm (111 in) | Outside-spiker |
| 8 | Sindy Lenz | 3 October 1998 | 1.85 m (6 ft 1 in) | 70 kg (150 lb) | 300 cm (120 in) | 288 cm (113 in) | Outside-spiker |
| 9 | Luise Klein | 15 January 1999 | 1.78 m (5 ft 10 in) | 59 kg (130 lb) | 291 cm (115 in) | 280 cm (110 in) | Setter |
| 10 | Esther Spöler | 12 July 1998 | 1.84 m (6 ft 0 in) | 70 kg (150 lb) | 296 cm (117 in) | 283 cm (111 in) | Middle-blocker |
| 11 | Merle Weidt | 20 July 1999 | 1.86 m (6 ft 1 in) | 64 kg (141 lb) | 297 cm (117 in) | 286 cm (113 in) | Middle-blocker |
| 12 | Hanna Orthmann | 3 October 1998 | 1.85 m (6 ft 1 in) | 69 kg (152 lb) | 302 cm (119 in) | 291 cm (115 in) | Outside-spiker |
| 14 | Elisa Lohmann | 22 July 1998 | 1.74 m (5 ft 9 in) | 60 kg (130 lb) | 290 cm (110 in) | 278 cm (109 in) | Libero |

=== Greece ===
The following is the Grecian roster in the 2015 Girls' Youth European Volleyball Championship.

Head Coach: (Greece) Kyriakos Kamperidis

| No. | Name | Date of birth | Height | Weight | Spike | Block | Position |
|---|---|---|---|---|---|---|---|
| 1 | Maria-Aikaterini Xanthopoulou | 24 October 1998 | 1.61 m (5 ft 3 in) | 50 kg (110 lb) | 240 cm (94 in) | 230 cm (91 in) | Libero |
| 4 | Aikaterini Papazoglou | 2 May 1998 | 1.82 m (6 ft 0 in) | 65 kg (143 lb) | 278 cm (109 in) | 264 cm (104 in) | Outside-spiker |
| 5 | Aikaterini Vlachou | 23 March 1998 | 1.76 m (5 ft 9 in) | 50 kg (110 lb) | 240 cm (94 in) | 230 cm (91 in) | Setter |
| 6 | Effrosyni Alexakou | 26 February 2000 | 1.82 m (6 ft 0 in) | 75 kg (165 lb) | 318 cm (125 in) | 290 cm (110 in) | Outside-spiker |
| 8 | Zoi Aimilianou | 28 June 1999 | 1.84 m (6 ft 0 in) | 69 kg (152 lb) | 288 cm (113 in) | 270 cm (110 in) | Middle-blocker |
| 9 | Athanasia Fakopoulidou | 22 May 1998 | 1.78 m (5 ft 10 in) | 55 kg (121 lb) | 288 cm (113 in) | 278 cm (109 in) | Outside-spiker |
| 13 | Alkistis Karafoulidou | 13 September 1999 | 1.95 m (6 ft 5 in) | 78 kg (172 lb) | 284 cm (112 in) | 280 cm (110 in) | Opposite |
| 15 | Vasiliki-Maria Dialla | 5 March 1998 | 1.85 m (6 ft 1 in) | 77 kg (170 lb) | 283 cm (111 in) | 272 cm (107 in) | Middle-blocker |
| 16 | Lydia-Evangelia Kastanou | 27 June 1998 | 1.91 m (6 ft 3 in) | 79 kg (174 lb) | 286 cm (113 in) | 276 cm (109 in) | Opposite |
| 19 | Panagiota Kalagasidi | 15 May 1999 | 1.84 m (6 ft 0 in) | 80 kg (180 lb) | 310 cm (120 in) | 285 cm (112 in) | Middle-blocker |
| 21 | Zoi Faki | 2 August 1998 | 1.87 m (6 ft 2 in) | 66 kg (146 lb) | 283 cm (111 in) | 272 cm (107 in) | Outside-spiker |
| 22 | Konstantina Pateli | 20 June 1998 | 1.70 m (5 ft 7 in) | 70 kg (150 lb) | 310 cm (120 in) | 280 cm (110 in) | Setter |

=== Slovenia ===
The following is the Slovenian roster in the 2015 Girls' Youth European Volleyball Championship.

Head Coach: (Slovenia) Oleg Gorbachov

| No. | Name | Date of birth | Height | Weight | Spike | Block | Position |
|---|---|---|---|---|---|---|---|
| 3 | Sabrina Calcina | 31 January 1998 | 1.87 m (6 ft 2 in) | 71 kg (157 lb) | 294 cm (116 in) | 278 cm (109 in) | Opposite |
| 4 | Teja Bavdaż | 3 September 1998 | 1.81 m (5 ft 11 in) | 69 kg (152 lb) | 284 cm (112 in) | 268 cm (106 in) | Middle-blocker |
| 5 | Taja Tućen | 18 April 1998 | 1.79 m (5 ft 10 in) | 67 kg (148 lb) | 287 cm (113 in) | 274 cm (108 in) | Middle-blocker |
| 7 | Daja Gorisek | 10 September 1998 | 1.76 m (5 ft 9 in) | 63 kg (139 lb) | 278 cm (109 in) | 260 cm (100 in) | Outside-spiker |
| 9 | Nika Cotar | 25 March 1998 | 1.76 m (5 ft 9 in) | 62 kg (137 lb) | 277 cm (109 in) | 261 cm (103 in) | Libero |
| 10 | Nina Kotnik | 12 December 1999 | 1.79 m (5 ft 10 in) | 64 kg (141 lb) | 280 cm (110 in) | 261 cm (103 in) | Opposite |
| 11 | Manca Lenart | 5 February 1998 | 1.79 m (5 ft 10 in) | 60 kg (130 lb) | 279 cm (110 in) | 262 cm (103 in) | Setter |
| 14 | Nika Cigale | 6 May 2000 | 1.80 m (5 ft 11 in) | 66 kg (146 lb) | 277 cm (109 in) | 262 cm (103 in) | Middle-blocker |
| 15 | Pia Blażić | 25 July 1998 | 1.78 m (5 ft 10 in) | 78 kg (172 lb) | 290 cm (110 in) | 270 cm (110 in) | Outside-spiker |
| 16 | Anja Maćek | 27 March 1998 | 1.78 m (5 ft 10 in) | 67 kg (148 lb) | 268 cm (106 in) | 253 cm (100 in) | Outside-spiker |
| 17 | Ana Marija Vovk | 29 March 1998 | 1.81 m (5 ft 11 in) | 80 kg (180 lb) | 293 cm (115 in) | 283 cm (111 in) | Outside-spiker |
| 19 | Kaja Keglević | 20 August 1999 | 1.70 m (5 ft 7 in) | 55 kg (121 lb) | 260 cm (100 in) | 250 cm (98 in) | Setter |

== Pool B ==
=== Turkey ===
The following is the Turkish roster in the 2015 Girls' Youth European Volleyball Championship.

Head Coach: (Turkey) Mehmet Nur Bedestenloglu

| No. | Name | Date of birth | Height | Weight | Spike | Block | Position |
|---|---|---|---|---|---|---|---|
| 2 | Tuğba Şenoğlu | 2 February 1998 | 1.84 m (6 ft 0 in) | 64 kg (141 lb) | 275 cm (108 in) | 270 cm (110 in) | Outside-spiker |
| 5 | Sinem Bayazit | 14 January 1999 | 1.64 m (5 ft 5 in) | 54 kg (119 lb) | 270 cm (110 in) | 250 cm (98 in) | Libero |
| 6 | Saliha Şahin | 2 February 1998 | 1.84 m (6 ft 0 in) | 64 kg (141 lb) | 275 cm (108 in) | 270 cm (110 in) | Opposite |
| 7 | Buket Gülübay | 28 February 1999 | 1.83 m (6 ft 0 in) | 62 kg (137 lb) | 298 cm (117 in) | 281 cm (111 in) | Setter |
| 8 | Yasemin Güveli | 5 January 1999 | 1.87 m (6 ft 2 in) | 68 kg (150 lb) | 300 cm (120 in) | 285 cm (112 in) | Middle-blocker |
| 10 | Selmin Karahan | 20 July 1998 | 1.80 m (5 ft 11 in) | 70 kg (150 lb) | 286 cm (113 in) | 285 cm (112 in) | Setter |
| 11 | Ezgi Akyaldiz | 25 May 1998 | 1.83 m (6 ft 0 in) | 69 kg (152 lb) | 290 cm (110 in) | 285 cm (112 in) | Outside-spiker |
| 13 | Melisa Memis | 27 January 1998 | 1.69 m (5 ft 7 in) | 65 kg (143 lb) | 270 cm (110 in) | 265 cm (104 in) | Libero |
| 14 | Çağla Erdem | 18 June 1998 | 1.86 m (6 ft 1 in) | 74 kg (163 lb) | 295 cm (116 in) | 285 cm (112 in) | Middle-blocker |
| 16 | Yasemin Özel | 13 May 1998 | 1.84 m (6 ft 0 in) | 76 kg (168 lb) | 285 cm (112 in) | 282 cm (111 in) | Opposite |
| 17 | Tutku Burcu Yüzgenç | 15 January 1999 | 1.88 m (6 ft 2 in) | 61 kg (134 lb) | 298 cm (117 in) | 295 cm (116 in) | Outside-spiker |
| 18 | Zehra Günes | 7 July 1999 | 1.94 m (6 ft 4 in) | 82 kg (181 lb) | 309 cm (122 in) | 292 cm (115 in) | Middle-blocker |

=== Belgium ===
The following is the Belgian roster in the 2015 Girls' Youth European Volleyball Championship.

Head Coach: (Belgium) Fien Callens

| No. | Name | Date of birth | Height | Weight | Spike | Block | Position |
|---|---|---|---|---|---|---|---|
| 1 | Amber De Tant | 22 March 1998 | 1.77 m (5 ft 10 in) | 63 kg (139 lb) | 303 cm (119 in) | 280 cm (110 in) | Libero |
| 2 | Silke Van Avermaet | 2 June 1999 | 1.92 m (6 ft 4 in) | 70 kg (150 lb) | 311 cm (122 in) | 290 cm (110 in) | Middle-blocker |
| 3 | Charlotte Coppin | 1 December 1998 | 1.85 m (6 ft 1 in) | 62 kg (137 lb) | 300 cm (120 in) | 283 cm (111 in) | Setter |
| 4 | Britt Herbots | 29 April 1999 | 1.82 m (6 ft 0 in) | 59 kg (130 lb) | 308 cm (121 in) | 283 cm (111 in) | Outside-spiker |
| 6 | Laure Flament | 18 June 1998 | 1.81 m (5 ft 11 in) | 75 kg (165 lb) | 298 cm (117 in) | 273 cm (107 in) | Opposite |
| 9 | Lisa Van Den Vonder | 7 September 1998 | 1.82 m (6 ft 0 in) | 65 kg (143 lb) | 293 cm (115 in) | 278 cm (109 in) | Outside-spiker |
| 10 | Elien Peeters | 26 April 1999 | 1.82 m (6 ft 0 in) | 70 kg (150 lb) | 294 cm (116 in) | 273 cm (107 in) | Middle-blocker |
| 11 | Manon Stragier | 12 March 1999 | 1.83 m (6 ft 0 in) | 67 kg (148 lb) | 305 cm (120 in) | 283 cm (111 in) | Opposite |
| 12 | Hanne Coppens | 7 May 1998 | 1.84 m (6 ft 0 in) | 68 kg (150 lb) | 303 cm (119 in) | 288 cm (113 in) | Middle-blocker |
| 14 | Anna Valkenborg | 4 January 1998 | 1.74 m (5 ft 9 in) | 58 kg (128 lb) | 290 cm (110 in) | 270 cm (110 in) | Libero |
| 16 | Lotte De Quick | 11 January 1998 | 1.72 m (5 ft 8 in) | 52 kg (115 lb) | 283 cm (111 in) | 260 cm (100 in) | Setter |
| 17 | Justine D'Hondt | 8 July 1999 | 1.75 m (5 ft 9 in) | 60 kg (130 lb) | 298 cm (117 in) | 267 cm (105 in) | Outside-spiker |

=== Poland ===
The following is the Polish roster in the 2015 Girls' Youth European Volleyball Championship.

Head Coach: (Poland) Andrzej Pec

| No. | Name | Date of birth | Height | Weight | Spike | Block | Position |
|---|---|---|---|---|---|---|---|
| 2 | Julia Iwona Nowicka | 21 October 1998 | 1.74 m (5 ft 9 in) | 58 kg (128 lb) | 293 cm (115 in) | 276 cm (109 in) | Setter |
| 4 | Natalia Murek | 8 September 1999 | 1.90 m (6 ft 3 in) | 73 kg (161 lb) | 302 cm (119 in) | 283 cm (111 in) | Outside-spiker |
| 6 | Aleksandra Rasinka | 6 November 1998 | 1.90 m (6 ft 3 in) | 78 kg (172 lb) | 310 cm (120 in) | 289 cm (114 in) | Opposite |
| 7 | Aleksandra Lipska | 25 February 1998 | 1.83 m (6 ft 0 in) | 70 kg (150 lb) | 304 cm (120 in) | 285 cm (112 in) | Outside-spiker |
| 8 | Weronika Sobiczewska | 6 May 1999 | 1.83 m (6 ft 0 in) | 60 kg (130 lb) | 304 cm (120 in) | 280 cm (110 in) | Middle-blocker |
| 9 | Zuzanna Gorecka | 10 April 2000 | 1.79 m (5 ft 10 in) | 57 kg (126 lb) | 301 cm (119 in) | 284 cm (112 in) | Outside-spiker |
| 10 | Alicja Grabka | 9 May 1998 | 1.78 m (5 ft 10 in) | 62 kg (137 lb) | 290 cm (110 in) | 275 cm (108 in) | Setter |
| 11 | Dagmara Dabrowska | 24 January 1998 | 1.87 m (6 ft 2 in) | 77 kg (170 lb) | 300 cm (120 in) | 283 cm (111 in) | Opposite |
| 12 | Paulina Swider | 21 October 1999 | 1.84 m (6 ft 0 in) | 69 kg (152 lb) | 301 cm (119 in) | 287 cm (113 in) | Middle-blocker |
| 13 | Martyna Swirad | 1 May 1998 | 1.83 m (6 ft 0 in) | 72 kg (159 lb) | 301 cm (119 in) | 287 cm (113 in) | Middle-blocker |
| 14 | Agata Michalewicz | 28 April 1998 | 1.81 m (5 ft 11 in) | 63 kg (139 lb) | 293 cm (115 in) | 278 cm (109 in) | Setter |
| 16 | Kinga Drabek | 10 May 1998 | 1.68 m (5 ft 6 in) | 54 kg (119 lb) | 276 cm (109 in) | 281 cm (111 in) | Libero |

=== Czech Republic ===
The following is the Czechs roster in the 2015 Girls' Youth European Volleyball Championship.

Head Coach: (Czech Republic) Ales Novak

| No. | Name | Date of birth | Height | Weight | Spike | Block | Position |
|---|---|---|---|---|---|---|---|
| 1 | Pavla Meidlova | 8 May 1999 | 1.78 m (5 ft 10 in) | 69 kg (152 lb) | 298 cm (117 in) | 290 cm (110 in) | Outside-spiker |
| 2 | Daniela Cerna | 12 September 1999 | 1.84 m (6 ft 0 in) | 69 kg (152 lb) | 309 cm (122 in) | 300 cm (120 in) | Outside-spiker |
| 3 | Eva Valentova | 3 March 1998 | 1.74 m (5 ft 9 in) | 68 kg (150 lb) | 281 cm (111 in) | 276 cm (109 in) | Libero |
| 4 | Veronika Jandova | 11 June 1998 | 1.87 m (6 ft 2 in) | 74 kg (163 lb) | 301 cm (119 in) | 293 cm (115 in) | Middle-blocker |
| 5 | Vendula Valaskova | 10 February 1998 | 1.79 m (5 ft 10 in) | 66 kg (146 lb) | 299 cm (118 in) | 290 cm (110 in) | Outside-spiker |
| 6 | Klara Mikelova | 3 April 1998 | 1.82 m (6 ft 0 in) | 76 kg (168 lb) | 296 cm (117 in) | 290 cm (110 in) | Outside-spiker |
| 9 | Anna Sucha | 28 April 1998 | 1.80 m (5 ft 11 in) | 83 kg (183 lb) | 293 cm (115 in) | 287 cm (113 in) | Opposite |
| 10 | Gabriela Kopacova | 24 June 1998 | 1.85 m (6 ft 1 in) | 70 kg (150 lb) | 313 cm (123 in) | 308 cm (121 in) | Opposite |
| 13 | Sarka Sloufova | 27 December 1998 | 1.78 m (5 ft 10 in) | 61 kg (134 lb) | 290 cm (110 in) | 280 cm (110 in) | Outside-spiker |
| 16 | Sarah Cruz | 8 March 1998 | 1.83 m (6 ft 0 in) | 65 kg (143 lb) | 298 cm (117 in) | 290 cm (110 in) | Middle-blocker |
| 17 | Tiziana Baumrukova | 29 April 1998 | 1.75 m (5 ft 9 in) | 67 kg (148 lb) | 290 cm (110 in) | 280 cm (110 in) | Setter |
| 19 | Hana Judlova | 7 September 2000 | 1.84 m (6 ft 0 in) | 72 kg (159 lb) | 297 cm (117 in) | 290 cm (110 in) | Middle-blocker |

=== Netherlands ===
The following is the Dutch roster in the 2015 Girls' Youth European Volleyball Championship.

Head Coach: (Netherlands) Saskia Van Hintum

| No. | Name | Date of birth | Height | Weight | Spike | Block | Position |
|---|---|---|---|---|---|---|---|
| 1 | Florien Reesink | 9 June 1998 | 1.74 m (5 ft 9 in) | 58 kg (128 lb) | 272 cm (107 in) | 260 cm (100 in) | Libero |
| 2 | Anne Hesselink | 28 May 1999 | 1.77 m (5 ft 10 in) | 63 kg (139 lb) | 283 cm (111 in) | 270 cm (110 in) | Setter |
| 3 | Charlotte Haar | 12 May 1999 | 1.80 m (5 ft 11 in) | 68 kg (150 lb) | 286 cm (113 in) | 272 cm (107 in) | Setter |
| 5 | Christie Wolt | 5 May 1998 | 1.80 m (5 ft 11 in) | 62 kg (137 lb) | 290 cm (110 in) | 273 cm (107 in) | Outside-spiker |
| 6 | Kirsten Wessels | 4 August 1998 | 1.85 m (6 ft 1 in) | 70 kg (150 lb) | 286 cm (113 in) | 275 cm (108 in) | Outside-spiker |
| 7 | Emma Bredewoud | 4 November 1998 | 1.90 m (6 ft 3 in) | 67 kg (148 lb) | 290 cm (110 in) | 282 cm (111 in) | Outside-spiker |
| 9 | Nika Daalderop | 29 November 1998 | 1.86 m (6 ft 1 in) | 66 kg (146 lb) | 303 cm (119 in) | 289 cm (114 in) | Opposite |
| 10 | Eline Timmerman | 30 December 1998 | 1.92 m (6 ft 4 in) | 77 kg (170 lb) | 299 cm (118 in) | 288 cm (113 in) | Middle-blocker |
| 11 | Carlijn Koebrugde | 7 January 1998 | 1.88 m (6 ft 2 in) | 71 kg (157 lb) | 292 cm (115 in) | 284 cm (112 in) | Middle-blocker |
| 12 | Bo Martherus | 20 January 1998 | 1.64 m (5 ft 5 in) | 53 kg (117 lb) | 263 cm (104 in) | 250 cm (98 in) | Libero |
| 15 | Laury Donker | 17 April 1999 | 1.87 m (6 ft 2 in) | 72 kg (159 lb) | 297 cm (117 in) | 287 cm (113 in) | Middle-blocker |
| 16 | Jasmijn Akse | 29 June 1999 | 1.88 m (6 ft 2 in) | 63 kg (139 lb) | 287 cm (113 in) | 281 cm (111 in) | Opposite |

=== Bulgaria ===
The following is the Bulgarian roster in the 2015 Girls' Youth European Volleyball Championship.

Head Coach: (Bulgaria) Radoslav Bakardzhiev

| No. | Name | Date of birth | Height | Weight | Spike | Block | Position |
|---|---|---|---|---|---|---|---|
| 1 | Ani Bozdeva | 30 January 1999 | 1.86 m (6 ft 1 in) | 61 kg (134 lb) | 300 cm (120 in) | 285 cm (112 in) | Outside-spiker |
| 3 | Radostina Marinova | 2 October 1998 | 1.84 m (6 ft 0 in) | 65 kg (143 lb) | 303 cm (119 in) | 290 cm (110 in) | Middle-blocker |
| 4 | Kathryn Dimitrova | 27 November 1999 | 1.90 m (6 ft 3 in) | 73 kg (161 lb) | 303 cm (119 in) | 296 cm (117 in) | Opposite |
| 5 | Aleksandra Milanova | 4 July 2001 | 1.80 m (5 ft 11 in) | 74 kg (163 lb) | 295 cm (116 in) | 282 cm (111 in) | Outside-spiker |
| 6 | Zlatena Salabasheva | 19 June 1998 | 1.69 m (5 ft 7 in) | 57 kg (126 lb) | 265 cm (104 in) | 280 cm (110 in) | Libero |
| 7 | Monika Krasteva | 9 May 1999 | 1.82 m (6 ft 0 in) | 64 kg (141 lb) | 298 cm (117 in) | 284 cm (112 in) | Outside-spiker |
| 10 | Polina Neykova | 7 October 1998 | 1.83 m (6 ft 0 in) | 73 kg (161 lb) | 290 cm (110 in) | 281 cm (111 in) | Setter |
| 11 | Vasilena Papanova | 2 February 1999 | 1.78 m (5 ft 10 in) | 65 kg (143 lb) | 290 cm (110 in) | 285 cm (112 in) | Setter |
| 13 | Madlen Rasheva | 1 March 1998 | 1.83 m (6 ft 0 in) | 67 kg (148 lb) | 300 cm (120 in) | 288 cm (113 in) | Opposite |
| 14 | Diana Kazakova | 31 July 1998 | 1.80 m (5 ft 11 in) | 70 kg (150 lb) | 280 cm (110 in) | 268 cm (106 in) | Outside-spiker |
| 16 | Yoanna Atanasova | 29 January 1998 | 1.86 m (6 ft 1 in) | 73 kg (161 lb) | 290 cm (110 in) | 280 cm (110 in) | Middle-blocker |
| 20 | Simona Minkova | 7 June 2000 | 1.83 m (6 ft 0 in) | 74 kg (163 lb) | 285 cm (112 in) | 273 cm (107 in) | Middle-blocker |

== See also ==
- 2015 Boys' Youth European Volleyball Championship squads
