= 2013 Girls' Youth European Volleyball Championship =

Tournament details
- Host country: Serbia; Montenegro
- Dates: March 30 – April 7
- Teams: 12
- Venues: 2 (in Kladovo, Bar host cities)

Final positions
- Champions: Poland (2nd title)

Tournament awards
- MVP: Anastasia Guerra (ITA)

The 2013 Girls' Youth European Volleyball Championship was played in Serbia and Montenegro from March 30 to April 7, 2013. The top six teams qualified for the 2013 Youth World Championship.

== Participating teams ==
- Host
  - Serbia
  - Montenegro
- Defending Champion
  - Turkey
- Qualified through 2013 Girls' Youth European Volleyball Championship Qualification
  - Czech Republic
  - France
  - Germany
  - Greece
  - Italy
  - Netherlands
  - Poland
  - Russia
  - Slovenia

== Preliminary round ==
The draw was held on 18 January 2013 at Belgrade, Serbia.

=== Pool A ===
Bar, Montenegro.

Pos	Team	Pld	W	L	Pts	SPW	SPL	SPR	SW	SL	SR	Qualification
1	Italy	5	5	0	14	406	290	1.400	15	2	7.500	Semifinals
2	Poland	5	3	2	9	490	449	1.091	12	10	1.200	Semifinals
3	Greece	5	3	2	8	436	443	0.984	10	10	1.000	5th to 8th classification
4	Slovenia	5	2	3	8	409	373	1.097	10	10	1.000	5th to 8th classification
5	Czech Republic	5	2	3	6	400	447	0.895	8	11	0.727	
6	Montenegro	5	0	5	0	289	428	0.675	3	15	0.200	

Date	Time		Score		Set 1	Set 2	Set 3	Set 4	Set 5	Total	Report
30 Mar	15:00	Poland	3–2	Slovenia	25–19	12–25	22–25	25–20	15–12	99–101	Report
30 Mar	17:30	Italy	3–0	Greece	25–21	25–19	25–22			75–62	Report
30 Mar	20:00	Montenegro	1–3	Czech Republic	17–25	25–15	13–25	25–27		80–92	Report
31 Mar	15:00	Poland	2–3	Italy	27–25	25–16	16–25	23–25	6–15	97–106	Report
31 Mar	17:30	Slovenia	3–1	Czech Republic	19–25	25–13	25–13	26–24		95–75	Report
31 Mar	20:00	Greece	3–1	Montenegro	25–23	14–25	25–20	25–10		89–78	Report
1 Apr	15:00	Italy	3–0	Slovenia	25–11	25–14	25–20			75–45	Report
1 Apr	17:30	Czech Republic	3–1	Greece	25–21	20–25	29–27	26–24		100–97	Report
1 Apr	20:00	Montenegro	1–3	Poland	20–25	14–25	25–22	13–25		72–97	Report
3 Apr	15:00	Slovenia	2–3	Greece	25–20	25–14	15–25	18–25	10–15	93–99	Report
3 Apr	17:30	Poland	3–1	Czech Republic	23–25	25–13	25–18	27–25		100–81	Report
3 Apr	20:00	Italy	3–0	Montenegro	25–10	25–15	25–9			75–34	Report
4 Apr	15:00	Greece	3–1	Poland	27–25	28–26	9–25	25–21		89–97	Report
4 Apr	17:30	Czech Republic	0–3	Italy	16–25	19–25	17–25			52–75	Report
4 Apr	20:00	Montenegro	0–3	Slovenia	7–25	9–25	9–25			25–75	Report

=== Pool B ===
Kladovo, Serbia.

Pos	Team	Pld	W	L	Pts	SPW	SPL	SPR	SW	SL	SR	Qualification
1	Turkey	5	5	0	15	437	365	1.197	15	3	5.000	Semifinals
2	Serbia	5	3	2	10	415	398	1.043	11	8	1.375	Semifinals
3	Germany	5	3	2	7	498	474	1.051	11	11	1.000	5th to 8th classification
4	Russia	5	2	3	7	453	456	0.993	10	11	0.909	5th to 8th classification
5	Netherlands	5	2	3	6	393	434	0.906	8	11	0.727	
6	France	5	0	5	0	392	461	0.850	4	15	0.267	

Date	Time		Score		Set 1	Set 2	Set 3	Set 4	Set 5	Total	Report
29 Mar	15:00	Russia	2–3	Germany	23–25	23–25	28–26	25–20	10–15	109–111	Report
29 Mar	17:30	Turkey	3–1	France	25–22	18–25	25–21	25–22		93–90	Report
29 Mar	20:00	Serbia	3–1	Netherlands	18–25	25–12	25–22	25–11		93–70	Report
30 Mar	15:00	Russia	1–3	Turkey	13–25	25–21	18–25	20–25		76–96	Report
30 Mar	17:30	Germany	1–3	Netherlands	20–25	21–25	25–19	23–25		89–94	Report
30 Mar	20:00	France	0–3	Serbia	15–25	22–25	22–25			59–75	Report
31 Mar	15:00	Turkey	3–1	Germany	23–25	25–23	25–15	25–21		98–84	Report
31 Mar	17:30	Netherlands	3–1	France	25–18	23–25	25–21	25–20		98–84	Report
31 Mar	20:00	Serbia	3–1	Russia	22–25	25–19	25–14	25–22		97–80	Report
2 Apr	15:00	Germany	3–1	France	28–26	25–19	22–25	25–13		100–83	Report
2 Apr	17:30	Russia	3–1	Netherlands	18–25	25–19	25–18	25–14		93–76	Report
2 Apr	20:00	Turkey	3–0	Serbia	25–18	25–19	25–23			75–60	Report
3 Apr	15:00	France	1–3	Russia	25–20	17–25	15–25	19–25		76–95	Report
3 Apr	17:30	Netherlands	0–3	Turkey	17–25	23–25	15–25			55–75	Report
3 Apr	20:00	Serbia	2–3	Germany	18–25	12–25	26–24	27–25	7–15	90–114	Report

== Final round ==
=== 5th to 8th places bracket ===
5th to 8th Classification
2013-04-06 – Bar
Greece	3
Russia	0
2013-04-06 – Bar
Germany	1
Slovenia	3

5th place match
2013-04-07 – Bar
Greece	3
Slovenia	2
7th place match
2013-04-07 – Bar
Russia	2
Germany	3

=== Championship bracket ===
Semifinal
2013-04-06 – Bar
Italy	3
Serbia	1
2013-04-06 – Bar
Turkey	2
Poland	3

Final
2013-04-07 – Bar
Italy	2
Poland	3
3rd place match
2013-04-07 – Bar
Serbia	0
Turkey	3

=== 5th to 8th classification ===
Date	Time		Score		Set 1	Set 2	Set 3	Set 4	Set 5	Total	Report
06 Apr	10:30	Greece	3–0	Russia	25–21	25–21	25–21			75–63	Report
06 Apr	13:00	Germany	1–3	Slovenia	19–25	25–16	18–25	15–25		77–91	Report

=== Semifinals ===
Date	Time		Score		Set 1	Set 2	Set 3	Set 4	Set 5	Total	Report
06 Apr	15:30	Italy	3–1	Serbia	25–21	18–25	25–20	25–13		93–79	Report
06 Apr	18:00	Turkey	2–3	Poland	23–25	17–25	25–19	25–21	11–15	101–105	Report

=== 7th place match ===
Date	Time		Score		Set 1	Set 2	Set 3	Set 4	Set 5	Total	Report
07 Apr	10:30	Russia	2–3	Germany	24–26	23–25	25–22	25–22	9–15	106–110	Report

=== 5th place match ===
Date	Time		Score		Set 1	Set 2	Set 3	Set 4	Set 5	Total	Report
07 Apr	13:00	Greece	3–2	Slovenia	25–21	25–17	24–26	17–25	15–10	106–99	Report

=== 3rd place match ===
Date	Time		Score		Set 1	Set 2	Set 3	Set 4	Set 5	Total	Report
07 Apr	15:30	Serbia	0–3	Turkey	22–25	23–25	15–25			60–75	Report

=== Final ===
Date	Time		Score		Set 1	Set 2	Set 3	Set 4	Set 5	Total	Report
07 Apr	18:00	Italy	2–3	Poland	25–21	25–17	19–25	25–27	16–18	110–108	Report

== Final standing ==
Rank	Team
1st place, gold medalist(s)	Poland
2nd place, silver medalist(s)	Italy
3rd place, bronze medalist(s)	Turkey
4	Serbia
5	Greece
6	Slovenia
7	Germany
8	Russia
9	Netherlands
10	Czech Republic
11	France
12	Montenegro

Qualified for the 2013 Youth World Championship

== Individual awards ==
- Most valuable player
  - Anastasia Guerra (ITA)
- Best spiker
  - Pelin Aroguz (TUR)
- Best blocker
  - Hande Baladin (TUR)
- Best server
  - Maja Aleksic (SRB)
- Best scorer
  - Anthi Vasilantonaki (GRE)
- Best setter
  - Eva Mori (SLO)
- Best receiver
  - Pola Nowakowska (POL)
- Best libero
  - Marianna Maggipinto (ITA)
