= Egypt women's national under-19 volleyball team =

Youth volleyball team representing Egypt

Egypt U19
- Association: Egyptian Volleyball Federation
- Confederation: CAVB

Uniforms
Home	Away	Third

Youth Olympic Games
- Appearances: 1 (First in 2010)
- Best result: 5th (2010)

FIVB U19 World Championship
- Appearances: 8 (First in 1993)
- Best result: 9th (1993, 2005)

African U18 Championship
- Appearances: 11 (First in 2002)
- Best result: (gold) Champions (2002, 2004, 2011, 2013, 2014, 2016, 2018, 2022)
- www.evbf.org (in Arabic)

The Egypt women's national under-19 volleyball team (Arabic: منتخب مصر للإناث تحت 19 سنة لكرة الطائرة) represents Egypt in international women's volleyball competitions and friendly matches for players under the age of 19. It is administered by the Egyptian Volleyball Federation, which is an affiliate of the Federation of International Volleyball (FIVB) and also a part of the African Volleyball Confederation (CAVB).

== Results ==
=== Summer Youth Olympics ===
Champions Runners up Third place Fourth place

Youth Olympic Games
Year	Round	Position	Pld	W	L	SW	SL	Squad
(Singapore) 2010	First Round	5th Place						Squad
(China) 2014	No volleyball event							
(Argentina) 2018	No volleyball event							
Total	0 Titles	0/1						

=== FIVB U19 World Championship ===
Champions Runners up Third place Fourth place

FIVB U19 World Championship
Year	Round	Position	Pld	W	L	SW	SL	Squad
(Brazil) 1989	Did not qualify							
(Portugal) 1991	Did not qualify							
(Czechoslovakia) 1993		9th place						
(France) 1995	Did not qualify							
(Thailand) 1997	Did not qualify							
(Portugal) 1999	Did not qualify							
(Croatia) 2001	Did not qualify							
(Poland) 2003		13th place						Squad
(Macau) 2005		9th place						Squad
(Mexico) 2007	Did not qualify							
(Thailand) 2009		15th place						Squad
(Turkey) 2011		14th place						Squad
(Thailand) 2013		15th place						Squad
(Peru) 2015		14th place						Squad
(Argentina) 2017	Did not qualify							
(Egypt) 2019		Qualified as Host						Squad
(Mexico) 2021		18th place						Squad
(Croatia) / (Hungary) 2023		16th place						Squad
Total	0 Titles	10/18						

=== African U18 Championship ===
African U18 Championship
Year	Round	Position	Pld	W	L	SW	SL	Squad
(Egypt) 2004		Champions						
(Algeria) 2006		Runners-up						
(Tunisia) 2008		Runners-up						
(Egypt) 2010		Champions						
(Egypt) 2011		Champions						
(Egypt) 2013		Champions						
(Egypt) 2014		Champions						
(Madagascar) 2016		Champions						
Total	6 Titles	8/8						

== Team ==
=== Current squad ===
The following is the Egyptian roster in the 2015 FIVB Volleyball Girls' U18 World Championship.

Head Coach: Mohamed Abdeen

No.	Name	Date of birth	Height	Weight	Spike	Block	2015 club
1	Zeina Elelemy	1 January 2000	1.80 m (5 ft 11 in)	70 kg (150 lb)	—	—	(Egypt) Shooting Club
2	Reem Elmohandes	28 September 1999	1.75 m (5 ft 9 in)	67 kg (148 lb)	259 cm (102 in)	249 cm (98 in)	(Egypt) Al Ahly
4	Nada Meawad (C)	12 April 1998	1.80 m (5 ft 11 in)	71 kg (157 lb)	277 cm (109 in)	267 cm (105 in)	(Egypt) Al Shams
6	Mayar Mohamed	5 February 2000	1.86 m (6 ft 1 in)	78 kg (172 lb)	—	—	(Egypt) Al Ahly
7	Noura Moawad	12 April 1998	1.82 m (6 ft 0 in)	80 kg (180 lb)	—	—	(Egypt) Al Shams
8	Rana Elawa	1 January 1998	1.74 m (5 ft 9 in)	60 kg (130 lb)	—	—	(Egypt) Shooting Club
9	Hanya Elshebeny	6 June 1999	1.70 m (5 ft 7 in)	60 kg (130 lb)	—	—	(Egypt) El Shams Club
11	Maya Ahmed	8 March 1998	1.78 m (5 ft 10 in)	66 kg (146 lb)	—	—	(Egypt) Al Ahly
13	Nourallah Amin	25 November 2000	1.86 m (6 ft 1 in)	70 kg (150 lb)	286 cm (113 in)	275 cm (108 in)	(Egypt) Al Ahly
15	Youmna Sabik	21 August 1998	1.63 m (5 ft 4 in)	51 kg (112 lb)	—	—	(Egypt) Al Shams
17	Salma Mahmoud	4 February 1999	1.75 m (5 ft 9 in)	56 kg (123 lb)	—	—	(Egypt) Al Ahly
20	Mariam Morsy	2 January 1999	1.87 m (6 ft 2 in)	83 kg (183 lb)	289 cm (114 in)	269 cm (106 in)	(Egypt) Al Ahly
