= 2024 Girls' U18 African Nations Volleyball Championship =

Tournament details
- Host country: Tunisia
- City: Tunis
- Dates: 5–8 August
- Teams: 2
- Venue: 1 (in 1 host city)

Final positions
- Champions: Tunisia (8th title)
- Runners-up: Egypt

Tournament statistics
- Matches played: 3

The 2024 Girls' U18 African Nations Volleyball Championship was the 17th edition of the Girls' U18 African Nations Volleyball Championship, the biennial international youth volleyball tournament organised by the African Volleyball Confederation (CAVB) for the girls' under-19 national teams of Africa. It was held in Tunis, Tunisia from 5 to 8 August 2024.

Only two national teams took part in the tournament, with players born on or after 1 January 2007 eligible to participate. Originally five teams confirmed their participation including Egypt, Morocco, Mauritius, Rwanda and hosts Tunisia. However, only Egypt and Tunisia took part while Morocco, Mauritius and Rwanda withdrew.

Same as previous editions, the tournament acted as the CAVB qualifiers for the FIVB Volleyball Girls' U19 World Championship. Only the champion team qualified for the 2025 FIVB Volleyball Girls' U19 World Championship in Croatia and Serbia, as the CAVB suffered a reduction of their places from 3 to 1 by playing their qualification tournament with only two teams.

Tunisia won their third title by beating Egypt in two games out of three and as champions qualified for the 2025 FIVB Volleyball Girls' U19 World Championship.

== Host and venue ==
The African Volleyball Confederation awarded Tunisia the hosting rights for the tournament on 24 June 2024. The competition took place in Tunis at the Al Machatel Hall, a venue located in the Baldevebe Nursery west of Belvedere Park. The Al Machatel Hall had recently been inaugurated in July 2024.

== Results ==
All match times are in local times, TNT (UTC+1), as listed by CAVB.

Pos	Team	Pld	W	L	Pts	SW	SL	SR	SPW	SPL	SPR
1	Tunisia (H, C)	3	2	1	6	7	3	2.333	238	210	1.133
2	Egypt	3	1	2	3	3	7	0.429	210	238	0.882

Rules for classification: 1) Matches won; 2) Points; 3) Sets Ratio; 4)Points ratio; 5) Head-to-head result.
(C) Champion; (H) Host

Date	Time		Score		Set 1	Set 2	Set 3	Set 4	Set 5	Total	Report
5 Aug	20:00	Tunisia	3–0	Egypt	25–21	26–24	25–23			76–68	Report
6 Aug	20:00	Egypt	3–1	Tunisia	25–22	11–25	25–17	25–23		86–87	Report
8 Aug	18:00	Tunisia	3–0	Egypt	25–18	25–17	25–21			75–56	Report

== Final standing ==
Qualified for 2025 FIVB Girls' U19 World Championship.

Rank	Team
1st place, gold medalist(s)	Tunisia
2nd place, silver medalist(s)	Egypt

2024 Girls' U18 African Nations Championship champions

Tunisia
Third title

Team Roster:

Arij Boughanmi, Syrine Atitalh, Fatma Chikhaoui, Soulayma Mbarek (L), Mayssem Jridi, Amryem Dellegi (L), Salsabil Khlifi, Sinda Ben Hamid (c), Doua Ben Ammar, Eya Toumi, Hela Aoun, Hajer Karamousli.

Head coach: (Tunisia) Lotfi Ben Slimane

== Individual awards ==
The following individual awards were presented at the end of the tournament.

- Most valuable player (MVP)

Wajih Moalla (TUN)

- Best middle blockers

Mohamed El Kouche (MAR)
Youssef Elrassas (EGY)

- Best setter

Fedi Ben Slimane (TUN)

- Best opposite spiker

Wajih Moalla (TUN)

- Best outside spikers

Hamza Awad (EGY)
Rasem Ksouda (TUN)

- Best libero

Omar Ghrab (TUN)
