= Tunisia men's national under-23 volleyball team =

Tunisia U-23
- Nickname(s): نسور قرطاج (Eagles of Carthage)
- Association: Tunisian Volleyball Federation
- Confederation: CAVB

Uniforms
Home	Away	Third

FIVB U23 World Championship
- Appearances: 2 (First in 2013)
- Best result: 8th : (2013)

African U23 Championship
- Appearances: 1 (First in 2014)
- Best result: Champions (gold) (1): 2014
- www.ftvb.org

Tunisia men's national under-23 volleyball team
Medal record

African Championship
Gold medal – first place	2014 Sharm El Sheikh	Team

The Tunisia men's national under-23 volleyball team (Arabic: منتخب تونس تحت 23 سنة لكرة الطائرة), nicknamed Les Aigles de Carthage (The Eagles of Carthage or The Carthage Eagles), represents Tunisia in international volleyball competitions and friendly matches. The team is one of the leading nations in men's volleyball on the African continent.

== Results ==
Champions Runners up Third place Fourth place

- Red border color indicates tournament was held on home soil.

=== FIVB U23 World Championship ===
FIVB U23 World Championship
Year	Round	Position	Pld	W	L	SW	SL	Squad
(Brazil) 2013		8th						Squad
(United Arab Emirates) 2015		9th						Squad
(Egypt) 2017		Not qualified						Squad
Total	0 Title	2/3						

=== Men's U23 African Volleyball Championship ===
African U23 Championship
Year	Round	Position	Pld	W	L	SW	SL	Squad
(Egypt) 2014		1st						Squad
(Algeria) 2017		Did not compete						Squad
Total	1 Titles	1/2						

== See also ==
- Tunisia women's national under-23 volleyball team
- Tunisia men's national volleyball team
- Tunisia men's national under-21 volleyball team
- Tunisia men's national under-19 volleyball team
- Tunisian Volleyball Federation
