= Tunisia women's national under-19 volleyball team =

Tunisia Women U-18
- Nickname(s): نسور قرطاج (Eagles of Carthage)
- Association: Tunisian Volleyball Federation
- Confederation: CAVB

Uniforms
Home	Away	Third

FIVB U19 World Championship
- Appearances: 4 (First in 2005)
- Best result: 13th: 2005

African U18 Championship
- Appearances: 7 (First in 2004)
- Best result: Champions (gold) (4): 2006, 2008, 2010, 2024, 2026
- www.ftvb.org
Honours
Event	1st	2nd	3rd
African Championship	3	3	1
Total	4	3	1

Tunisia women's national under-19 volleyball team
Medal record

African Championship
Gold medal – first place	2006 Tizi Ouzou	Team
Gold medal – first place	2008 Tunis	Team
Gold medal – first place	2010 Cairo	Team
Gold medal – first place	2024 Tunis	Team
Silver medal – second place	2004 Cairo	Team
Silver medal – second place	2013 Cairo	Team
Silver medal – second place	2014 Algiers	Team
Bronze medal – third place	2011 Cairo	Team

The Tunisia women's national under-18 volleyball team (Arabic: منتخب تونس للإناث تحت 18 سنة لكرة الطائرة), nicknamed Les Aigles de Carthage (The Eagles of Carthage or The Carthage Eagles), represents Tunisia in international volleyball competitions and friendly matches. The team is one of the leading nations in women's volleyball on the African continent.

== Results ==
Champions Runners up Third place Fourth place

- Red border color indicates tournament was held on home soil.

=== Summer Youth Olympics ===
Youth Olympic Games
Year	Round	Position	Pld	W	L	SW	SL	Squad
(Singapore) 2010	Didn't Qualify							
(China) 2014	No Volleyball Event							
(Argentina) 2018	No Volleyball Event							
(Senegal) 2026	TBD							
Total	0 Titles	0/1						

=== FIVB U18 World Championship ===
FIVB U18 World Championship
Year	Round	Position	Pld	W	L	SW	SL	Squad
(Brazil) 1989	Did not compete							
(Portugal) 1991	Did not compete							
(Czechoslovakia) 1993	Did not compete							
(France) 1995	Did not compete							
(Thailand) 1997	Did not compete							
(Portugal) 1999	Did not compete							
(Croatia) 2001	Did not compete							
(Poland) 2003	Did not compete							
(Macau) 2005		13th						Squad
(Mexico) 2007		16th						Squad
(Thailand) 2009		16th						Squad
(Turkey) 2011	Did not compete							
(Thailand) 2013		19th						Squad
(Peru) 2015	Did not compete							
(Argentina) 2017	Did not compete							
(Egypt) 2019	Did not compete							
(Mexico) 2021	Did not compete							
(Croatia) / (Hungary) 2023	Did not compete							
Total	0 Titles	4/18						

=== African U18 Championship ===
African U18 Championship
Year	Round	Position	Pld	W	L	SW	SL	Squad
(Egypt) 2004		2nd						
(Algeria) 2006		1st						
(Tunisia) 2008		1st						
(Egypt) 2010		1st						
(Egypt) 2011		3rd						
(Egypt) 2013		2nd						
(Algeria) 2014		2nd						
(Madagascar) 2016	Did not compete							
(Egypt) 2018	Did not compete							
(N/A) 2020	Canceled due to COVID-19 pandemic							
(Nigeria) 2022	Did not compete							
(Tunisia) 2024		1st						
(Egypt) 2026		1st						
Total	5 Titles	9/15						

== See also ==
- Tunisia women's national volleyball team
- Tunisia women's national under-23 volleyball team
- Tunisia women's national under-20 volleyball team
- Tunisian Volleyball Federation
