= 2009 FIVB Volleyball Girls' U18 World Championship =

2009 FIVB Girls Youth World Championship
Tournament details
- Host country: Thailand
- Dates: 3–12 July 2009
- Teams: 16
- Venues: 2 (in Nakhon Ratchasima host cities)

Final positions
- Champions: Brazil (3rd title)

Tournament awards
- MVP: Samara Almeida (BRA)

The 2009 FIVB Girls Youth Volleyball World Championship was held in Nakhon Ratchasima, Thailand from 3 to 12 July 2009. 16 teams participated in the tournament.

== Qualification process ==
Confederation	Method of Qualification	Date	Venue	Vacancies	Qualified
FIVB	Host			1	Thailand
NORCECA	2008 NORCECA Youth Championship	5–10 July 2008	Guaynabo, Puerto Rico	3	United States; Mexico; Dominican Republic
CSV	2008 South American Youth Championship	1–6 September 2008	Lima, Peru	2	Brazil; Peru
AVC	2008 Asian Youth Championship	11–18 October 2008	Manila, Philippines	2	Japan; China
CAVB	2008 African Youth Championship	28–30 December 2008	Tunis, Tunisia	2	Tunisia; Egypt
CEV	2009 European Youth Championship	4–9 April 2009	Rotterdam, Netherlands	6	Belgium; Serbia; Italy; Slovakia; Turkey; Germany
Total				16	

== Pools composition ==
Pool A	Pool B	Pool C	Pool D
Thailand; Serbia; Egypt; Germany	China; Turkey; Tunisia; Peru	Brazil; Italy; Dominican Republic; Slovakia	Japan; United States; Mexico; Belgium

== First round ==
All times are Thai Standard Time (UTC+07:00).

=== Pool A ===
Pos	Team	Pld	W	L	Pts	SW	SL	SR	SPW	SPL	SPR	Qualification
1	Serbia	3	3	0	6	9	1	9.000	245	174	1.408	Pool E or Pool F
2	Thailand	3	2	1	5	7	4	1.750	247	226	1.093	Pool E or Pool F
3	Germany	3	1	2	4	4	7	0.571	202	218	0.927	Pool G or Pool H
4	Egypt	3	0	3	3	0	9	0.000	149	225	0.662	Pool G or Pool H

Date	Time		Score		Set 1	Set 2	Set 3	Set 4	Set 5	Total	Report
3 July	15:00	Egypt	0–3	Thailand	21–25	18–25	16–25			55–75	P2
3 July	17:00	Serbia	3–0	Germany	25–9	25–21	25–21			75–51	P2
4 July	12:30	Serbia	3–0	Egypt	25–16	25–15	25–15			75–46	P2
4 July	15:00	Germany	1–3	Thailand	23–25	9–25	25–20	19–25		76–95	P2
5 July	15:00	Thailand	1–3	Serbia	25–20	21–25	11–25	20–25		77–95	P2
5 July	17:15	Egypt	0–3	Germany	12–25	18–25	18–25			48–75	P2

=== Pool B ===
Pos	Team	Pld	W	L	Pts	SW	SL	SR	SPW	SPL	SPR	Qualification
1	Turkey	3	3	0	6	9	2	4.500	259	216	1.199	Pool E or Pool F
2	Peru	3	2	1	5	8	3	2.667	256	212	1.208	Pool E or Pool F
3	China	3	1	2	4	3	6	0.500	195	183	1.066	Pool G or Pool H
4	Tunisia	3	0	3	3	0	9	0.000	123	225	0.547	Pool G or Pool H

Date	Time		Score		Set 1	Set 2	Set 3	Set 4	Set 5	Total	Report
3 July	10:30	China	0–3	Peru	19–25	24–26	16–25			59–76	P2
3 July	12:30	Turkey	3–0	Tunisia	25–17	25–19	25–14			75–50	P2
4 July	10:30	Tunisia	0–3	Peru	21–25	7–25	16–25			44–75	P2
4 July	17:30	Turkey	3–0	China	25–22	25–19	25–20			75–61	P2
5 July	10:30	Peru	2–3	Turkey	25–21	25–23	20–25	23–25	12–15	105–109	P2
5 July	13:15	China	3–0	Tunisia	25–9	25–15	25–8			75–32	P2

=== Pool C ===
Pos	Team	Pld	W	L	Pts	SW	SL	SR	SPW	SPL	SPR	Qualification
1	Brazil	3	3	0	6	9	0	MAX	225	152	1.480	Pool E or Pool F
2	Italy	3	2	1	5	6	7	0.857	275	264	1.042	Pool E or Pool F
3	Slovakia	3	1	2	4	5	8	0.625	246	279	0.882	Pool G or Pool H
4	Dominican Republic	3	0	3	3	4	9	0.444	241	292	0.825	Pool G or Pool H

Date	Time		Score		Set 1	Set 2	Set 3	Set 4	Set 5	Total	Report
3 July	10:30	Italy	3–2	Dominican Republic	25–17	24–26	26–28	25–17	15–11	115–99	P2
3 July	12:30	Slovakia	0–3	Brazil	23–25	13–25	18–25			54–75	P2
4 July	10:30	Dominican Republic	0–3	Brazil	16–25	18–25	7–25			41–75	P2
4 July	13:00	Italy	3–2	Slovakia	25–17	19–25	25–17	19–25	15–6	103–90	P2
5 July	10:30	Slovakia	3–2	Dominican Republic	25–23	23–25	25–17	14–25	15–11	102–101	P2
5 July	17:30	Brazil	3–0	Italy	25–22	25–20	25–15			75–57	P2

=== Pool D ===
Pos	Team	Pld	W	L	Pts	SW	SL	SR	SPW	SPL	SPR	Qualification
1	Belgium	3	3	0	6	9	2	4.500	282	245	1.151	Pool E or Pool F
2	Japan	3	2	1	5	7	4	1.750	260	241	1.079	Pool E or Pool F
3	Mexico	3	1	2	4	4	8	0.500	256	261	0.981	Pool G or Pool H
4	United States	3	0	3	3	3	9	0.333	237	288	0.823	Pool G or Pool H

Date	Time		Score		Set 1	Set 2	Set 3	Set 4	Set 5	Total	Report
3 July	13:15	United States	2–3	Mexico	25–22	20–25	15–25	26–24	9–15	95–111	P2
3 July	16:00	Belgium	3–1	Japan	23–25	25–19	25–22	31–29		104–95	P2
4 July	10:30	Mexico	1–3	Japan	18–25	18–25	25–15	21–25		82–90	P2
4 July	17:35	United States	1–3	Belgium	25–20	13–25	30–32	19–25		87–102	P2
5 July	13:20	Belgium	3–0	Mexico	25–21	26–24	25–18			76–63	P2
5 July	15:15	Japan	3–0	United States	25–23	25–18	25–14			75–55	P2

== Second round ==
=== Pool E (1st–8th) ===
Pos	Team	Pld	W	L	Pts	SW	SL	SR	SPW	SPL	SPR	Qualification
1	Brazil	3	3	0	6	9	3	3.000	284	239	1.188	Semifinals
2	Serbia	3	2	1	5	8	7	1.143	306	305	1.003	Semifinals
3	Peru	3	1	2	4	5	8	0.625	248	289	0.858	5th–8th place
4	Japan	3	0	3	3	5	9	0.556	303	308	0.984	5th–8th place

Date	Time		Score		Set 1	Set 2	Set 3	Set 4	Set 5	Total	Report
7 July	10:30	Peru	0–3	Brazil	19–25	19–25	16–25			54–75	P2
7 July	12:30	Serbia	3–2	Japan	22–25	17–25	25–21	26–24	15–10	105–105	P2
8 July	10:30	Serbia	3–2	Peru	25–16	25–17	20–25	22–25	15–7	107–90	P2
8 July	13:00	Japan	1–3	Brazil	25–27	25–19	26–28	15–25		91–99	P2
9 July	10:30	Peru	3–2	Japan	26–24	20–25	25–22	18–25	15–11	104–107	P2
9 July	17:30	Brazil	3–2	Serbia	25–18	25–18	22–25	23–25	15–8	110–94	P2

=== Pool F (1st–8th) ===
Pos	Team	Pld	W	L	Pts	SW	SL	SR	SPW	SPL	SPR	Qualification
1	Belgium	3	3	0	6	9	2	4.500	257	205	1.254	Semifinals
2	Turkey	3	2	1	5	6	5	1.200	251	246	1.020	Semifinals
3	Italy	3	1	2	4	6	7	0.857	279	294	0.949	5th–8th place
4	Thailand	3	0	3	3	2	9	0.222	228	270	0.844	5th–8th place

Date	Time		Score		Set 1	Set 2	Set 3	Set 4	Set 5	Total	Report
7 July	10:00	Thailand	0–3	Belgium	12–25	21–25	21–25			54–75	P2
7 July	17:00	Turkey	3–1	Italy	23–25	26–24	25–17	25–19		99–85	P2
8 July	15:30	Thailand	1–3	Turkey	22–25	25–22	24–26	15–25		86–98	P2
8 July	18:00	Belgium	3–2	Italy	25–17	25–27	25–19	17–25	15–9	107–97	P2
9 July	13:00	Turkey	0–3	Belgium	23–25	13–25	18–25			54–75	P2
9 July	15:00	Italy	3–1	Thailand	20–25	25–16	27–25	25–22		97–88	P2

=== Pool G (9th–16th) ===
Pos	Team	Pld	W	L	Pts	SW	SL	SR	SPW	SPL	SPR	Qualification
1	Germany	3	3	0	6	9	1	9.000	248	185	1.341	9th–12th place
2	United States	3	2	1	5	6	5	1.200	237	207	1.145	9th–12th place
3	Slovakia	3	1	2	4	6	6	1.000	246	248	0.992	13th–16th place
4	Tunisia	3	0	3	3	0	9	0.000	134	225	0.596	13th–16th place

Date	Time		Score		Set 1	Set 2	Set 3	Set 4	Set 5	Total	Report
7 July	10:30	Germany	3–0	United States	26–24	25–20	25–13			76–57	P2
7 July	17:45	Tunisia	0–3	Slovakia	9–25	18–25	19–25			46–75	P2
8 July	12:30	United States	3–2	Slovakia	25–18	19–25	21–25	25–16	15–4	105–88	P2
8 July	15:00	Germany	3–0	Tunisia	25–19	25–10	25–16			75–45	P2
9 July	10:30	Tunisia	0–3	United States	9–25	19–25	15–25			43–75	P2
9 July	17:00	Slovakia	1–3	Germany	25–22	19–25	20–25	19–25		83–97	P2

=== Pool H (9th–16th) ===
Pos	Team	Pld	W	L	Pts	SW	SL	SR	SPW	SPL	SPR	Qualification
1	Mexico	3	3	0	6	9	1	9.000	242	182	1.330	9th–12th place
2	Dominican Republic	3	2	1	5	6	5	1.200	238	221	1.077	9th–12th place
3	China	3	1	2	4	6	6	1.000	260	241	1.079	13th–16th place
4	Egypt	3	0	3	3	0	9	0.000	129	225	0.573	13th–16th place

Date	Time		Score		Set 1	Set 2	Set 3	Set 4	Set 5	Total	Report
7 July	12:30	Egypt	0–3	Mexico	18–25	12–25	8–25			38–75	P2
7 July	15:00	China	2–3	Dominican Republic	25–22	22–25	18–25	25–21	6–15	96–108	P2
8 July	10:30	Mexico	3–0	Dominican Republic	25–18	25–22	25–15			75–55	P2
8 July	17:00	Egypt	0–3	China	10–25	20–25	11–25			41–75	P2
9 July	12:30	China	1–3	Mexico	21–25	25–17	23–25	20–25		89–92	P2
9 July	15:00	Dominican Republic	3–0	Egypt	25–11	25–17	25–22			75–50	P2

== Final round ==
=== 13th–16th bracket ===
Classification
2009-07-11 - Nakhon Ratchasima
Slovakia	3
Egypt	0
2009-07-11 - Nakhon Ratchasima
China	3
Tunisia	0

13th place match
2009-07-12 - Nakhon Ratchasima
Slovakia	2
China	3
15th place match
2009-07-12 - Nakhon Ratchasima
Egypt	3
Tunisia	2

Date	Time		Score		Set 1	Set 2	Set 3	Set 4	Set 5	Total	Report
11 July	10:30	Slovakia	3–0	Egypt	25–8	25–23	25–17			75–48	P2
11 July	12:30	China	3–0	Tunisia	25–15	25–10	25–13			75–38	P2

Date	Time		Score		Set 1	Set 2	Set 3	Set 4	Set 5	Total	Report
12 July	10:00	Egypt	3–2	Tunisia	25–21	18–25	21–25	25–16	15–9	104–96	P2

Date	Time		Score		Set 1	Set 2	Set 3	Set 4	Set 5	Total	Report
12 July	15:20	Slovakia	2–3	China	23–25	25–21	24–26	25–19	13–15	110–106	P2

=== 9th–12th bracket ===
Classification
2009-07-11 - Nakhon Ratchasima
Germany	3
Dominican Republic	2
2009-07-11 - Nakhon Ratchasima
Mexico	3
United States	0

9th place match
2009-07-12 - Nakhon Ratchasima
Germany	2
Mexico	3
11th place match
2009-07-12 - Nakhon Ratchasima
Dominican Republic	3
United States	0

Date	Time		Score		Set 1	Set 2	Set 3	Set 4	Set 5	Total	Report
11 July	15:00	Germany	3–2	Dominican Republic	14–25	27–25	25–11	14–25	15–13	95–99	P2
11 July	17:30	Mexico	3–0	United States	25–21	25–19	25–21			75–61	P2

Date	Time		Score		Set 1	Set 2	Set 3	Set 4	Set 5	Total	Report
12 July	15:30	Dominican Republic	3–0	United States	25–23	25–19	25–23			75–65	P2

Date	Time		Score		Set 1	Set 2	Set 3	Set 4	Set 5	Total	Report
12 July	12:45	Germany	2–3	Mexico	26–24	25–21	16–25	20–25	13–15	100–110	P2

=== 5th–8th bracket ===
Classification
2009-07-11 - Nakhon Ratchasima
Peru	3
Thailand	1
2009-07-11 - Nakhon Ratchasima
Italy	1
Japan	3

5th place match
2009-07-12 - Nakhon Ratchasima
Peru	1
Japan	3
7th place match
2009-07-12 - Nakhon Ratchasima
Thailand	3
Italy	2

Date	Time		Score		Set 1	Set 2	Set 3	Set 4	Set 5	Total	Report
11 July	12:35	Peru	3–1	Thailand	25–18	23–25	25–20	26–24		99–87	P2
11 July	10:30	Italy	1–3	Japan	25–23	12–25	16–25	23–25		76–98	P2

Date	Time		Score		Set 1	Set 2	Set 3	Set 4	Set 5	Total	Report
12 July	15:30	Thailand	3–2	Italy	25–23	24–26	25–22	16–25	15–10	105–106	P2

Date	Time		Score		Set 1	Set 2	Set 3	Set 4	Set 5	Total	Report
12 July	12:45	Peru	1–3	Japan	25–27	25–21	12–25	22–25		84–98	P2

=== Championship bracket ===
Classification
2009-07-11 - Nakhon Ratchasima
Brazil	3
Turkey	0
2009-07-11 - Nakhon Ratchasima
Belgium	1
Serbia	3

Final
2009-07-12 - Nakhon Ratchasima
Brazil	3
Serbia	1
Bronze Medal Match
2009-07-12 - Nakhon Ratchasima
Turkey	2
Belgium	3

==== Semifinals ====
Date	Time		Score		Set 1	Set 2	Set 3	Set 4	Set 5	Total	Report
11 July	15:05	Brazil	3–0	Turkey	25–18	25–21	25–20			75–59	P2
11 July	17:00	Belgium	1–3	Serbia	20–25	25–27	26–24	21–25		92–101	P2

==== Bronze Medal match ====
Date	Time		Score		Set 1	Set 2	Set 3	Set 4	Set 5	Total	Report
12 July	12:45	Turkey	2–3	Belgium	25–20	26–24	19–25	26–28	7–15	103–112	P2

==== Gold Medal match ====
Date	Time		Score		Set 1	Set 2	Set 3	Set 4	Set 5	Total	Report
12 July	15:30	Brazil	3–1	Serbia	25–20	26–24	23–25	25–17		99–86	P2

== Final standing ==
Rank	Team
1st place, gold medalist(s)	Brazil
2nd place, silver medalist(s)	Serbia
3rd place, bronze medalist(s)	Belgium
4	Turkey
5	Japan
6	Peru
7	Thailand
8	Italy
9	Mexico
10	Germany
11	Dominican Republic
12	United States
13	China
14	Slovakia
15	Egypt
16	Tunisia

2009 Women's U20 World champions

Brazil
3rd title

12–woman Roster
Rosane Maggioni (c), Sthefanie Paulino, Francyne Jacintho, Carolina Freitas, Eduarda Kraisch, Isabela Paquiardi, Ana Beatriz Corrêa, Samara Almeida, Priscila Heldes, Gabriella Souza, Samera Alcides, Carla Santos
Head coach
Luizomar de Moura

== Individual awards ==
- Most valuable player
  - Samara Almeida (BRA)
- Best scorer
  - Lise Van Hecke (BEL)
- Best spiker
  - Mari Horikawa (JPN)
- Best blocker
  - Ana Beatriz Correa (BRA)
- Best server
  - Sara Klisura (SRB)
- Best digger
  - Sumiko Mori (JPN)
- Best setter
  - Danica Radenković (SRB)
- Best receiver
  - Aree Promjanyar (THA)
- Best libero
  - Aree Promjanyar (THA)

== See also ==
- 2009 FIVB Boys Youth World Championship
