= Tunisia women's national under-23 volleyball team =

Tunisia Women U-23
- Nickname(s): نسور قرطاج (Eagles of Carthage)
- Association: Tunisian Volleyball Federation
- Confederation: CAVB

Uniforms
Home	Away	Third

FIVB U23 World Championship
- Appearances: None

African Women's U23 Championship
- Appearances: 1 (First in 2014)
- Best result: 2rd (silver) (1): 2014
- www.ftvb.org
Honours
Event	1st	2nd	3rd
African Championship	0	1	0
Total	0	1	0

Tunisia women's national under-23 volleyball team
Medal record

African Championship
Silver medal – second place	2014 Alger	Team

The Tunisia women's national under-23 volleyball team (Arabic: منتخب تونس للإناث تحت 23 سنة لكرة الطائرة), nicknamed Les Aigles de Carthage (The Eagles of Carthage or The Carthage Eagles), represents Tunisia in international volleyball competitions and friendly matches. The team is one of the leading nations in women's volleyball on the African continent.

== Results ==
Champions Runners up Third place Fourth place

- Red border color indicates tournament was held on home soil.

=== FIVB Volleyball Women's U23 World Championship ===
FIVB Women's U23 World Championship
Year	Round	Position	Pld	W	L	SW	SL	Squad
(Mexico) 2013	Did not compete							
(Turkey) 2015	Did not compete							
(Slovenia) 2017	Did not compete							
Total	0 Title	0/3						

=== Women's U23 African Volleyball Championship ===
African Women's U23 Championship
Year	Round	Position	Pld	W	L	SW	SL	Squad
(Algeria) 2014		2rd						
(Kenya) 2016	Did not compete							
Total	0 Titles	1/2						

== See also ==
- Tunisia men's national under-23 volleyball team
- Tunisia women's national volleyball team
- Tunisia women's national under-20 volleyball team
- Tunisia women's national under-18 volleyball team
- Tunisian Volleyball Federation
