= 2014 Women's U23 African Volleyball Championship =

2014 African volleyball competition

Tournament details
- Host country: Algeria
- Dates: 7–9 September
- Teams: 4
- Venue: 1 (in 1 host city)

Final positions
- Champions: Egypt (1st title)

Tournament awards
- MVP: (Tunisia) Jihen Mohamed

The 2014 Women's U23 African Volleyball Championship was the 1st edition of the Women's U23 African Volleyball Championship, it was held 7 to 9 September 2014 in Algiers, Algeria. It was the inaugural edition of the tournament. The tournament was organized by the African Volleyball Confederation, in association with Algerian Volleyball Federation.

The tournament served as the African qualifiers for the 2015 FIVB Volleyball Women's U23 World Championship held in Ankara, Turkey which the winner team qualified for the world championship. Egypt won the tournament.

== Participated teams ==
- Algeria (hosts)
- Botswana
- Egypt
- Tunisia

== Venue ==
All rounds
Algiers, Algeria
Hacène Harcha Arena
Capacity: 8,000

== Final group ==
Pos	Team	Pld	W	L	Pts	SW	SL	SR	SPW	SPL	SPR
1	Egypt	3	3	0	9	9	1	9.000	249	166	1.500
2	Tunisia	3	2	1	6	6	4	1.500	225	197	1.142
3	Algeria	3	1	2	3	5	6	0.833	240	229	1.048
4	Botswana	3	0	3	0	0	9	0.000	103	225	0.458

Date	Time		Score		Set 1	Set 2	Set 3	Set 4	Set 5	Total	Report
7 Sep	15:00	Egypt	3–0	Tunisia	26–24	25–16	25–18			76–58	
7 Sep	19:00	Botswana	0–3	Algeria	14–25	13–25	12–25			39–75	
8 Sep	15:00	Botswana	0–3	Egypt	12–25	5–25	7–25			24–75	
8 Sep	19:00	Algeria	1–3	Tunisia	15–25	21–25	25–17	20–25		81–92	
9 Sep	15:00	Tunisia	3–0	Botswana	25–12	25–12	25–16			75–40	
9 Sep	19:00	Egypt	3–1	Algeria	25–23	25–16	23–25	25–20		98–84	

== Final standing ==
Rank	Team
1st place, gold medalist(s)	Egypt
2nd place, silver medalist(s)	Tunisia
3rd place, bronze medalist(s)	Algeria
4	Botswana

Qualified for the 2015 World Championship

2014 African U23 champions

Egypt
1st title

== Awards ==
- Most valuable player
  (Tunisia) Jihen Mohamed
- Best outside spikers
  (Algeria) Celia Bourihane
- Best setter
  (Tunisia) Nihel Kebaier
- Best receiver
  (Egypt) Nihel Ahmed
- Best server
  (Algeria) Celia Bourihane
- Best middle blockers
  (Egypt) Sarrah Hanafy
- Best libero
  (Tunisia) Fatima Ktari

== See also ==
- 2014 Men's U23 African Volleyball Championship
