= Women's U23 African Nations Volleyball Championship =

National volleyball competition

- Sport: Volleyball
- Founded: 2014
- First season: 2014
- No. of teams: 5
- Continent: CAVB (Africa)
- Most recent champion: Egypt (2nd title)
- Most titles: Egypt (2 titles)

The Women's U23 African Volleyball Championship is a national teams continental sport competition for players under 23 years, held biannually and organized by the African Volleyball Confederation since 2014.

== Summary ==
Year	Host	Final			3rd place match			Teams
Year	Host	Champions	Score	Runners-up	3rd place	Score	4th place	Teams
2014; Details	(Algeria); Alger	Egypt	Round-robin	Tunisia	Algeria	Round-robin	Botswana	4
2016; Details	(Kenya); Nairobi	Egypt	Round-robin	Kenya	Rwanda	Round-robin	Botswana	5
2018	(Tunisia); Tunis	Cancelled						

=== Teams reaching the top four ===
Team	Champions	Runners-up	3rd place	4th place
Egypt	2 (2014, 2016)			
Tunisia		1 (2014)		
Kenya		1 (2016)		
Algeria			1 (2014)	
Rwanda			1 (2016)	
Botswana				2 (2014, 2016)

== Participation by nation ==
Nation	(Algeria) 2014	(Kenya) 2016	Years
Algeria	3rd		1
Botswana	4th	4th	2
Egypt	1st	1st	2
Kenya		2nd	1
Rwanda		3rd	1
Senegal		5th	1
Tunisia	2nd		1
Total	4	5	

== MVP by edition ==
- 2014 – Jihen Mohamed (TUN)
- 2016 – Aya Ahmed (EGY)

== Medal summary ==
Rank	Nation	Gold	Silver	Bronze	Total
1	Egypt	2	0	0	2
2	Kenya	0	1	0	1
2	Tunisia	0	1	0	1
4	Algeria	0	0	1	1
4	Rwanda	0	0	1	1
Totals (5 entries)		2	2	2	6

== See also ==
- Men's U23 African Volleyball Championship
