= Austria women's national under-19 volleyball team =

Youth volleyball team representing Austria

Austria U19
- Association: Austrian Volleyball Federation
- Confederation: CEV

Uniforms
Home	Away	Third

FIVB U19 World Championship
- Appearances: 1 (First in 2005)
- Best result: 13th place : (2005)

Europe U18 / U17 Championship
- Appearances: 1 (First in 2005)
- Best result: 7th place : (2005)
- Volleyball Association of Austria

The Austria women's national under-19 volleyball team represents Austria in international women's volleyball competitions and friendly matches under the age 18 and it is ruled and managed by the Austrian Volleyball Federation That is an affiliate of Federation of International Volleyball FIVB and also a part of European Volleyball Confederation CEV.

== History ==
The Austria women's under-19 volleyball team has made a few appearances in international levels, the first was in the 2005 European Championship held that time in Estonia and they finished in 7th place and has qualified to the 2005 world championship for their first time as well and they finished in the 13th place, but since that time Austria didn't qualify to any international championships, They only participate in European Championship Qualifying tournament regularly.

== Results ==
=== Summer Youth Olympics ===
Champions Runners up Third place Fourth place

Youth Olympic Games
Year	Round	Position	Pld	W	L	SW	SL	Squad
(Singapore) 2010	Didn't qualify							
(China) 2014	No Volleyball Event							
(Argentina) 2018	No Volleyball Event							
Total	0 Titles	0/1						

=== FIVB U19 World Championship ===
Champions Runners up Third place Fourth place

FIVB U19 World Championship
Year	Round	Position	Pld	W	L	SW	SL	Squad
(Brazil) 1989 →	Didn't qualify							
(Poland) 2003 ←	Didn't qualify							
(Macau) 2005		13th place						Squad
(Mexico) 2007 →	Didn't qualify							
(Mexico) 2021 ←	Didn't qualify							
Total	0 Titles	1/17						

=== Europe U18 / U17 Championship ===
Champions Runners up Third place Fourth place

Europe U18 / U17 Championship
Year	Round	Position	Pld	W	L	SW	SL	Squad
(Spain) 1995 →	Didn't qualify							
(Croatia) 2003 ←	Didn't qualify							
(Estonia) 2005		7th place						Squad
(Czech Republic) 2007 →	Didn't qualify							
(Montenegro) 2020 ←	Didn't qualify							
Total	0 Titles	1/14						

== Team ==
=== Current squad ===
The Following players is the Austrian players that Competed in the 2018 Girls' U17 Volleyball European Championship

#	Name	Position	Height	Weight	Birthday	Spike	Block
	Brugger Marina	setter	172	54	2003	278	260
	Despotovic Bojana	setter	171	65	2002	262	245
	Fuchs Carina	outside-spiker	175	58	2002	289	265
	Helmreich Jasmin	outside-spiker	164	53	2002	270	255
	Janka Verena	outside-spiker	172	70	2002	283	261
	Kaltenleitner Lisa	outside-spiker	176	83	2002	283	265
	Lacek Anna	middle-blocker	181	68	2002	281	260
	Lacek Marie	middle-blocker	178	65	2002	280	276
	Lippitsch Amelie	libero	173	74	2002	280	262
	Rabitsch Magdalena	setter	168	55	2003	270	255
	Rabitsch Manuela	outside-spiker	174	62	2002	279	260
	Rihs Rebecca	opposite	175	70	2002	282	260
	Saric Sofia	outside-spiker	177	73	2002	270	250
	Schlappack Lisa	opposite	184	73	2002	291	273
	Tanasic Leticia	outside-spiker	171	62	2002	282	261
	Trailovic Anja	outside-spiker	174	60	2003	279	264
	Trauner Anna Katharina	setter	167	50	2002	273	256
	Ubiparip Bojana	middle-blocker	181	76	2002	280	261
	Vassilakopoulos Martha	middle-blocker	170	55	2003	270	260
	Wickl Celina	outside-spiker	175	65	2002	281	263
