= 2005 FIVB Volleyball Girls' U18 World Championship =

2005 FIVB Girls Youth World Championship
Tournament details
- Host country: Macau
- Dates: 23–31 July 2005
- Teams: 16
- Venue: 1 (in Macau host cities)

Final positions
- Champions: Brazil (2nd title)
- Runners-up: Russia
- Third place: Italy
- Fourth place: United States

Tournament awards
- MVP: Natalia Pereira (BRA)

The 2005 FIVB Girls Youth Volleyball World Championship was held in Macau from 23 to 31 July 2005. 16 teams participated in the tournament, and was won by Brazil.

== Qualification process ==
| Confederation | Method of Qualification | Date | Venue | Vacancies | Qualified |
|---|---|---|---|---|---|
| FIVB | Host | | | 1 | Macau |
| CAVB | 2004 African Youth Championship | January 21 – 23, 2004 | Cairo, Egypt | 2 | Egypt; Tunisia |
| CSV | 2004 South American Youth Championship | April 30 – May 4, 2004 | Guayaquil, Ecuador | 2 | Brazil; Argentina |
| NORCECA | 2004 NORCECA Youth Championship | July 14 – 17, 2004 | Catano, Puerto Rico | 2 | United States; Puerto Rico |
| CEV | 2005 European Youth Championship | March 29 – April 3, 2005 | Tallinn, Estonia | 6 | Ukraine; Russia; Italy; Croatia; Belarus; Austria* |
| AVC | 2005 Asian Youth Championship | May 24 – 31, 2005 | Mandaue City, Philippines | 3 | China; South Korea; Chinese Taipei |
| Total | | | | 16 | |

- * Austria replaced Germany.

== Pools composition ==
| Pool A | Pool B | Pool C | Pool D |
|---|---|---|---|
| Macau; Argentina; Croatia; Egypt | Austria; China; South Korea; Ukraine | Belarus; Brazil; Puerto Rico; Russia | Chinese Taipei; Italy; Tunisia; United States |

== First round ==
=== Pool A ===
| Pos | Team | Pld | W | L | Pts | SW | SL | SR | SPW | SPL | SPR | Qualification |
|---|---|---|---|---|---|---|---|---|---|---|---|---|
| 1 | Croatia | 3 | 3 | 0 | 6 | 9 | 1 | 9.000 | 241 | 169 | 1.426 | Seeding group |
| 2 | Argentina | 3 | 2 | 1 | 5 | 7 | 3 | 2.333 | 225 | 185 | 1.216 | Elimination group |
| 3 | Egypt | 3 | 1 | 2 | 4 | 3 | 6 | 0.500 | 159 | 188 | 0.846 | Elimination group |
| 4 | Macau | 3 | 0 | 3 | 3 | 0 | 9 | 0.000 | 142 | 225 | 0.631 | Eliminated |

| Date | | Score | | Set 1 | Set 2 | Set 3 | Set 4 | Set 5 | Total |
|---|---|---|---|---|---|---|---|---|---|
| 23 Jul | Argentina | 1–3 | Croatia | 16–25 | 19–25 | 25–16 | 15–25 | | 75–91 |
| 23 Jul | Egypt | 3–0 | Macau | 25–22 | 25–3 | 25–13 | | | 75–38 |
| 24 Jul | Argentina | 3–0 | Egypt | 25–17 | 25–14 | 25–7 | | | 75–38 |
| 24 Jul | Croatia | 3–0 | Macau | 25–17 | 25–14 | 25–17 | | | 75–48 |
| 25 Jul | Egypt | 0–3 | Croatia | 12–25 | 18–25 | 16–25 | | | 46–75 |
| 25 Jul | Macau | 0–3 | Argentina | 17–25 | 18–25 | 21–25 | | | 56–75 |

=== Pool B ===
| Pos | Team | Pld | W | L | Pts | SW | SL | SR | SPW | SPL | SPR | Qualification |
|---|---|---|---|---|---|---|---|---|---|---|---|---|
| 1 | South Korea | 3 | 2 | 1 | 5 | 7 | 5 | 1.400 | 281 | 272 | 1.033 | Seeding group |
| 2 | China | 3 | 2 | 1 | 5 | 8 | 6 | 1.333 | 319 | 319 | 1.000 | Elimination group |
| 3 | Ukraine | 3 | 1 | 2 | 4 | 7 | 7 | 1.000 | 318 | 304 | 1.046 | Elimination group |
| 4 | Austria | 3 | 1 | 2 | 4 | 4 | 8 | 0.500 | 269 | 292 | 0.921 | Eliminated |

| Date | | Score | | Set 1 | Set 2 | Set 3 | Set 4 | Set 5 | Total |
|---|---|---|---|---|---|---|---|---|---|
| 23 Jul | Ukraine | 2–3 | Austria | 27–25 | 15–25 | 25–16 | 28–30 | 15–17 | 110–113 |
| 23 Jul | China | 2–3 | South Korea | 20–25 | 26–28 | 26–24 | 26–24 | 13–15 | 111–116 |
| 24 Jul | Austria | 0–3 | South Korea | 19–25 | 18–25 | 27–29 | | | 64–79 |
| 24 Jul | Ukraine | 2–3 | China | 27–29 | 25–16 | 25–20 | 22–25 | 12–15 | 111–105 |
| 25 Jul | South Korea | 1–3 | Ukraine | 19–25 | 25–20 | 25–27 | 17–25 | | 86–97 |
| 25 Jul | China | 3–1 | Austria | 25–18 | 23–25 | 30–28 | 25–21 | | 103–92 |

=== Pool C ===
| Pos | Team | Pld | W | L | Pts | SW | SL | SR | SPW | SPL | SPR | Qualification |
|---|---|---|---|---|---|---|---|---|---|---|---|---|
| 1 | Brazil | 3 | 2 | 1 | 5 | 7 | 3 | 2.333 | 235 | 195 | 1.205 | Seeding group |
| 2 | Russia | 3 | 2 | 1 | 5 | 8 | 4 | 2.000 | 266 | 225 | 1.182 | Elimination group |
| 3 | Belarus | 3 | 2 | 1 | 5 | 6 | 6 | 1.000 | 252 | 247 | 1.020 | Elimination group |
| 4 | Puerto Rico | 3 | 0 | 3 | 3 | 1 | 9 | 0.111 | 159 | 245 | 0.649 | Eliminated |

| Date | | Score | | Set 1 | Set 2 | Set 3 | Set 4 | Set 5 | Total |
|---|---|---|---|---|---|---|---|---|---|
| 23 Jul | Belarus | 3–2 | Russia | 25–18 | 18–25 | 25–17 | 16–25 | 15–13 | 99–98 |
| 23 Jul | Puerto Rico | 0–3 | Brazil | 19–25 | 10–25 | 15–25 | | | 44–75 |
| 24 Jul | Belarus | 3–1 | Puerto Rico | 25–12 | 25–18 | 20–25 | 25–19 | | 95–74 |
| 24 Jul | Russia | 3–1 | Brazil | 18–25 | 25–22 | 25–15 | 25–23 | | 93–85 |
| 25 Jul | Puerto Rico | 0–3 | Russia | 14–25 | 8–25 | 19–25 | | | 41–75 |
| 25 Jul | Brazil | 3–0 | Belarus | 25–21 | 25–20 | 25–17 | | | 75–58 |

=== Pool D ===
| Pos | Team | Pld | W | L | Pts | SW | SL | SR | SPW | SPL | SPR | Qualification |
|---|---|---|---|---|---|---|---|---|---|---|---|---|
| 1 | United States | 3 | 3 | 0 | 6 | 9 | 0 | MAX | 233 | 170 | 1.371 | Seeding group |
| 2 | Italy | 3 | 2 | 1 | 5 | 6 | 3 | 2.000 | 218 | 170 | 1.282 | Elimination group |
| 3 | Chinese Taipei | 3 | 1 | 2 | 4 | 3 | 6 | 0.500 | 188 | 201 | 0.935 | Elimination group |
| 4 | Tunisia | 3 | 0 | 3 | 3 | 0 | 9 | 0.000 | 127 | 225 | 0.564 | Eliminated |

| Date | | Score | | Set 1 | Set 2 | Set 3 | Set 4 | Set 5 | Total |
|---|---|---|---|---|---|---|---|---|---|
| 23 Jul | Italy | 3–0 | Chinese Taipei | 25–17 | 25–15 | 25–19 | | | 75–51 |
| 23 Jul | Tunisia | 0–3 | United States | 12–25 | 15–25 | 13–25 | | | 40–75 |
| 24 Jul | Chinese Taipei | 0–3 | United States | 15–25 | 30–32 | 17–25 | | | 62–82 |
| 24 Jul | Italy | 3–0 | Tunisia | 25–15 | 25–16 | 25–12 | | | 75–43 |
| 25 Jul | Tunisia | 0–3 | Chinese Taipei | 17–25 | 13–25 | 14–25 | | | 44–75 |
| 25 Jul | United States | 3–0 | Italy | 26–24 | 25–21 | 25–23 | | | 76–68 |

== Second round ==
=== Play off – elimination group ===
| Date | | Score | | Set 1 | Set 2 | Set 3 | Set 4 | Set 5 | Total |
|---|---|---|---|---|---|---|---|---|---|
| 27 Jul | Argentina | 3–1 | Belarus | 25–17 | 25–22 | 25–27 | 25–16 | | 100–82 |
| 27 Jul | Ukraine | 1–3 | Italy | 26–24 | 21–25 | 20–25 | 16–25 | | 83–99 |
| 27 Jul | Russia | 3–0 | Egypt | 25–10 | 25–8 | 25–14 | | | 75–32 |
| 27 Jul | Chinese Taipei | 0–3 | China | 19–25 | 22–25 | 13–25 | | | 54–75 |

=== Play off – seeding group ===
| Date | | Score | | Set 1 | Set 2 | Set 3 | Set 4 | Set 5 | Total |
|---|---|---|---|---|---|---|---|---|---|
| 27 Jul | United States | 3–0 | Croatia | 27–25 | 25–20 | 30–28 | | | 82–73 |
| 27 Jul | Brazil | 3–0 | South Korea | 27–25 | 25–22 | 25–23 | | | 77–70 |

== Final round ==
Quarterfinals
29 July – Macau
Brazil | 3
Argentina | 0
29 July – Macau
Italy | 3
Croatia | 0
29 July – Macau
South Korea | 0
Russia | 3
29 July – Macau
China | 2
United States | 3

Semifinals
30 July – Macau
Brazil | 3
Italy | 1
30 July – Macau
Russia | 3
United States | 1

Final
31 July – Macau
Brazil | 3
Russia | 0
3rd place
31 July – Macau
Italy | 3
United States | 2

5th–8th places
30 July – Macau
Argentina | 1
Croatia | 3
30 July – Macau
South Korea | 3
China | 0

5th place
31 July – Macau
Croatia | 2
South Korea | 3
7th place
31 July – Macau
Argentina | 0
China | 3

=== Quarterfinals ===
| Date | | Score | | Set 1 | Set 2 | Set 3 | Set 4 | Set 5 | Total |
|---|---|---|---|---|---|---|---|---|---|
| 29 Jul | Brazil | 3–0 | Argentina | 25–15 | 25–14 | 25–17 | | | 75–46 |
| 29 Jul | Italy | 3–0 | Croatia | 27–25 | 25–17 | 25–23 | | | 77–65 |
| 29 Jul | South Korea | 0–3 | Russia | 18–25 | 19–25 | 17–25 | | | 54–75 |
| 29 Jul | China | 2–3 | United States | 20–25 | 25–21 | 25–23 | 19–25 | 9–15 | 98–109 |

=== 5th–8th semifinals ===
| Date | | Score | | Set 1 | Set 2 | Set 3 | Set 4 | Set 5 | Total |
|---|---|---|---|---|---|---|---|---|---|
| 30 Jul | Argentina | 1–3 | Croatia | 13–25 | 17–25 | 25–23 | 24–26 | | 79–99 |
| 30 Jul | South Korea | 3–0 | China | 25–23 | 25–21 | 25–21 | | | 75–65 |

=== Semifinals ===
| Date | | Score | | Set 1 | Set 2 | Set 3 | Set 4 | Set 5 | Total |
|---|---|---|---|---|---|---|---|---|---|
| 30 Jul | Brazil | 3–1 | Italy | 8–25 | 25–16 | 25–19 | 26–24 | | 84–84 |
| 30 Jul | Russia | 3–1 | United States | 19–25 | 27–25 | 25–20 | 25–17 | | 96–87 |

=== 7th place ===
| Date | | Score | | Set 1 | Set 2 | Set 3 | Set 4 | Set 5 | Total |
|---|---|---|---|---|---|---|---|---|---|
| 31 Jul | Argentina | 0–3 | China | 17–25 | 21–25 | 18–25 | | | 56–75 |

=== 5th place ===
| Date | | Score | | Set 1 | Set 2 | Set 3 | Set 4 | Set 5 | Total |
|---|---|---|---|---|---|---|---|---|---|
| 31 Jul | Croatia | 2–3 | South Korea | 25–21 | 21–25 | 22–25 | 25–17 | 8–15 | 101–103 |

=== 3rd place ===
| Date | | Score | | Set 1 | Set 2 | Set 3 | Set 4 | Set 5 | Total |
|---|---|---|---|---|---|---|---|---|---|
| 31 Jul | Italy | 3–2 | United States | 18–25 | 25–16 | 21–25 | 25–21 | 15–12 | 104–99 |

=== Final ===
| Date | | Score | | Set 1 | Set 2 | Set 3 | Set 4 | Set 5 | Total |
|---|---|---|---|---|---|---|---|---|---|
| 31 Jul | Brazil | 3–0 | Russia | 25–17 | 25–14 | 25–17 | | | 75–48 |

== Final standing ==
| Rank | Team |
|---|---|
| 1st place, gold medalist(s) | Brazil |
| 2nd place, silver medalist(s) | Russia |
| 3rd place, bronze medalist(s) | Italy |
| 4 | United States |
| 5 | South Korea |
| 6 | Croatia |
| 7 | China |
| 8 | Argentina |
| 9 | Belarus |
| 9 | Chinese Taipei |
| 9 | Egypt |
| 9 | Ukraine |
| 13 | Austria |
| 13 | Macau |
| 13 | Puerto Rico |
| 13 | Tunisia |

2005 FIVB Girls Youth World champions

Brazil
2nd title

12–woman Roster
Camila Monteiro, Erica Adachi, Martina Roese, Nicole Silva, Betina Schmidt, Silvana Papini, Priscila Daroit, Natalia Pereira, Amanda Francisco, Renata Maggioni, Maria de Lourdes Silva and Tandara Caixeta
Head coach
Luizomar de Moura

== Individual awards ==
- Most valuable player
  - Natalia Pereira (BRA)
- Best scorer
  - Alexandra Klineman (USA)
- Best spiker
  - Silvana Papini (BRA)
- Best blocker
  - Luisa Casillo (ITA)
- Best server
  - Ana Grbac (CRO)
- Best digger
  - Martina Roese (BRA)
- Best setter
  - Elena Peshekhonova (RUS)
- Best receiver
  - Irina Stratanovich (RUS)
