= 2016 Women's U23 African Volleyball Championship =

Tournament details
- Host country: Kenya
- Dates: 20–27 October
- Teams: 5
- Venue: 1 (in 1 host city)

Final positions
- Champions: Egypt (2nd title)

Tournament awards
- MVP: (Egypt) Aya Ahmed

The 2016 Women's U23 African Volleyball Championship was the 2nd edition of the Women's U23 African Volleyball Championship, it was held 20 to 27 October 2016 in Nairobi, Kenya. The tournament was organized by the African Volleyball Confederation, in association with Kenya Volleyball Association.

The tournament served as the African qualifiers for the 2017 FIVB Volleyball Women's U23 World Championship held in Ljubljana, Slovenia which the top tow teams of the tournament qualified for the world championship. Egypt won the tournament for the second time. Kenya finished second.

== Participated teams ==
- Botswana
- Egypt
- Kenya (hosts)
- Rwanda
- Senegal

== Venue ==
All rounds
Nairobi, Kenya
Kasarani Indoor Arena
Capacity: 5,000

== Final group ==
Pos	Team	Pld	W	L	Pts	SW	SL	SR	SPW	SPL	SPR
1	Egypt	4	4	0	12	12	1	12.000	318	220	1.445
2	Kenya	4	3	1	9	10	4	2.500	340	276	1.232
3	Rwanda	4	2	2	6	7	7	1.000	317	303	1.046
4	Botswana	4	1	3	3	3	11	0.273	268	340	0.788
5	Senegal	4	0	4	0	3	12	0.250	256	360	0.711

Date	Time		Score		Set 1	Set 2	Set 3	Set 4	Set 5	Total	Report
23 Oct	--:--	Rwanda	3–1	Senegal	26–28	25–17	25–14	25–19		101–78	
23 Oct	--:--	Botswana	0–3	Kenya	14–25	29–31	19–25			62–81	
24 Oct	--:--	Senegal	2–3	Botswana	23–25	25–22	25–22	23–25	13–15	109–109	
24 Oct	--:--	Kenya	1–3	Egypt	25–18	23–25	20–25	18–25		86–93	
25 Oct	--:--	Egypt	3–0	Rwanda	25–14	25–17	25–21			75–52	
25 Oct	--:--	Kenya	3–0	Senegal	25–17	25–7	25–8			75–32	
26 Oct	--:--	Rwanda	3–0	Botswana	25–16	25–19	25–17			75–52	
26 Oct	--:--	Senegal	0–3	Egypt	15–25	6–25	16–25			37–75	
27 Oct	--:--	Botswana	0–3	Egypt	16–25	10–25	19–25			45–75	
27 Oct	--:--	Kenya	3–1	Rwanda	25–23	23–25	25–22	25–19		98–89	

== Final standing ==
Rank	Team
1st place, gold medalist(s)	Egypt
2nd place, silver medalist(s)	Kenya
3rd place, bronze medalist(s)	Rwanda
4	Botswana
5	Senegal

Qualified for the 2017 World Championship

2016 African U23 champions

Egypt
2nd title

== Awards ==
- Most Valuable Player

(Egypt) Aya Ahmed

== See also ==
- 2017 Men's U23 African Volleyball Championship
