= Egypt women's national under-23 volleyball team =

Youth volleyball team representing Egypt

Egypt Women U-23
- Association: Egyptian Volleyball Federation
- Confederation: CAVB

Uniforms
Home	Away	Third

FIVB U23 World Championship
- Appearances: 2 (First in 2015)
- Best result: 9th place : 2017

African Women's U23 Championship
- Appearances: 2 (First in 2014)
- Best result: (gold) Champions : (2014, 2016)
- www.evbf.org (in Arabic)

The Egypt women's national under-23 volleyball team (Arabic: منتخب مصر للإناث تحت 23 سنة لكرة الطائرة), represents Egypt in international volleyball competitions and friendly matches.

== Results ==
Champions Runners up Third place Fourth place

- Green border color indicates tournament was held on home soil.

=== FIVB U23 World Championship ===
FIVB U23 World Championship
Year	Round	Position	Pld	W	L	SW	SL	Squad
(Mexico) 2013	Did not compete							
(Turkey) 2015		11th place						Squad
(Slovenia) 2017		9th place						Squad
Total	0 Titles	2/3						

=== African U23 Championship ===
African U23 Championship
Year	Round	Position	Pld	W	L	SW	SL	Squad
(Algeria) 2014		Champions						
(Kenya) 2016		Champions						
Total	2 Titles	2/2						

== Team ==
=== Current squad ===
The following is the Egyptian roster in the 2017 FIVB Women's U23 World Championship.

Head coach: Maged Mohamed

No.	Name	Date of birth	Height	Weight	Spike	Block	2016–2017 club
1	Aya Elshamy	27 November 1995	1.86 m (6 ft 1 in)	77 kg (170 lb)	297 cm (117 in)	279 cm (110 in)	(Egypt) Al Ahly SC
7	Mariam Ahmed	5 September 1995	1.68 m (5 ft 6 in)	57 kg (126 lb)	262 cm (103 in)	255 cm (100 in)	(Egypt) Al Ahly SC
10	Doaa Abdelghany	21 June 1996	1.85 m (6 ft 1 in)	70 kg (150 lb)	289 cm (114 in)	273 cm (107 in)	(Egypt) Zamalek SC
11	Mariam Ebrahim	13 March 1997	1.67 m (5 ft 6 in)	63 kg (139 lb)	273 cm (107 in)	261 cm (103 in)	(Egypt) El Shams Club
12	Farida El Askalany (c)	14 February 1995	1.86 m (6 ft 1 in)	65 kg (143 lb)	278 cm (109 in)	264 cm (104 in)	(Egypt) Al Ahly SC
13	Nourallah Amin	25 November 2000	1.84 m (6 ft 0 in)	70 kg (150 lb)	285 cm (112 in)	276 cm (109 in)	(Egypt) Al Ahly SC
14	Rahma Almohandes	9 November 1996	1.75 m (5 ft 9 in)	63 kg (139 lb)	277 cm (109 in)	265 cm (104 in)	(Egypt) Al Ahly SC
15	Doaa Elghobashy	8 November 1996	1.80 m (5 ft 11 in)	74 kg (163 lb)	285 cm (112 in)	275 cm (108 in)	(Egypt) Wady Degla
16	Lina Abdou	6 November 1996	1.73 m (5 ft 8 in)	65 kg (143 lb)	282 cm (111 in)	262 cm (103 in)	(Egypt) Alexandria Sporting Club
17	Aya Ahmed	27 April 1996	1.83 m (6 ft 0 in)	68 kg (150 lb)	270 cm (110 in)	262 cm (103 in)	(Egypt) El Shams SC
18	Alaa Badawy	13 February 1996	1.74 m (5 ft 9 in)	70 kg (150 lb)	188 cm (74 in)	176 cm (69 in)	(Egypt) Smouha SC
20	Sarah Hanafy	15 April 1997	1.78 m (5 ft 10 in)	73 kg (161 lb)	265 cm (104 in)	255 cm (100 in)	(Egypt) El Shams Club
