= Samara Almeida =

Brazilian volleyball player (born 1992)

Personal information
- Full name: Samara Rodrigues de Almeida
- Born: 16 July 1992 (age 34); São Paulo, Brazil
- Height: 1.85 m (6 ft 1 in)
- Weight: 62 kg (137 lb)
- Spike: 293 cm (115 in)
- Block: 278 cm (109 in)

Volleyball information
- Position: Outside hitter
- Current club: KPS Chemik Police
Honours
Women's volleyball
Representing Brazil
U18 World Championship
Gold medal – first place	2009 Thailand	Team

Samara Rodrigues de Almeida (born 16 July 1992) is a Brazilian female volleyball player. With her club Sollys Nestlé Osasco she competed at the 2011 and 2012 FIVB Volleyball Women's Club World Championship. She was elected the Most Valuable Player of the 2009 FIVB Volleyball Girls' U18 World Championship.

== Clubs ==
- (Brazil) Finasa Osasco (2007–2009)
- (Brazil) Macaé Sports (2009–2010)
- (Brazil) Finasa Osasco (2010–2013)
- (Brazil) Pinheiros (2013–2014)
- (Brazil) Sollys Osasco (2014–2015)
- (Brazil) Minas Tênis Clube (2015–2016)
- (Romania) CSM Volei Alba Blaj (2016–2017)
- (Switzerland) Volero Zürich (2017–2018)
- (France) RC Cannes (2018–2019)
- (Italy) Volley Bergamo (2019–2020)
- (Poland) Radomka Radom (2020–2021)

== Awards ==
=== Individuals ===
- 2009 FIVB U18 World Championship – "Most Valuable Player"
- 2010 U20 South American Championship – "Best Receiver"
