= Men's U23 African Nations Volleyball Championship =

Volleyball competition

- Most recent season or competition: 2017 Men's U23 African Volleyball Championship
- Sport: Volleyball
- Founded: 2014
- First season: 2014
- No. of teams: 6 (Finals)
- Continent: CAVB (Africa)
- Most recent champion: Algeria (1st title)
- Most titles: Algeria; Tunisia (1 title each)

The Men's U23 African Volleyball Championship is a sport competition for national teams with players under 23 years, held biannually and organized by the African Volleyball Confederation.

== History ==
The first championship is currently being held in Sharm El-Sheikh, Egypt, from November 7 to 12, 2014.

== Results ==
Year	Host	Final			Third place match		
Year	Host	Champion	Score	Runner-up	Third place	Score	Fourth place
2014; Details	(Egypt); Sharm El Sheikh	Tunisia	No playoffs	Egypt	Algeria	No playoffs	Libya
2016	(South Africa); Durban	Cancelled					
2017; Details	(Algeria); Algiers	Algeria	No playoffs	Mauritius	—N/a		

== Performance by nation ==
N°	Team	Champions	Runners-up	Third-place	Fourth-place
1	Algeria	1 (2017)		1 (2014)	
2	Tunisia	1 (2014)			
3	Egypt		1 (2014)		
3	Mauritius		1 (2017)		
4	Libya				1 (2014)

== Participating nations ==
Nation	2014	2017	Years
Algeria	3rd	1st	2
Egypt	2nd		1
Libya	4th		1
Morocco	6th		1
Rwanda	5th		1
Tunisia	1st		1
Mauritius		2nd	1
Total	6	2	

== See also ==
- Women's U23 African Volleyball Championship
