= Girls' U18 African Nations Volleyball Championship =

International youth volleyball competition

- Current season, competition or edition: 2026 Girls' U18 African Nations Volleyball Championship
- Sport: Volleyball
- No. of teams: 3-4
- Continent: CAVB (Africa)
- Most recent champion: Tunisia (5th title)
- Most titles: Egypt (7th title)

The Women's Africa Volleyball Championship U18 is a sport competition for national teams with women players under 18 years, currently held biannually and organized by the African Volleyball Confederation, the Africa volleyball federation.

== Summaries ==
| Year | Host | Final | | | 3rd place match | | | Teams |
| Year | Host | Champions | Score | Runners-up | 3rd place | Score | 4th place | Teams |
|---|---|---|---|---|---|---|---|---|
| 1994; Details | | . | – | | | – | | |
| 1996; Details | (Egypt); Cairo | Mauritius | – | | | – | | |
| 1998; Details | | Mauritius | – | | | – | | |
| 2000; Details | | Kenya | – | | | – | | |
| 2002; Details | | Egypt | – | Kenya | | – | | |
| 2004; Details | (Egypt); Cairo | Egypt | Round-robin | Tunisia | Algeria | —N/a | | 3 |
| 2006; Details | (Algeria); Tizi Ouzou | Tunisia | Round-robin | Egypt | Algeria | Round-robin | South Africa | 4 |
| 2008; Details | (Tunisia); Tunis | Tunisia | Round-robin | Egypt | Algeria | —N/a | | 3 |
| 2010; Details | (Egypt); Cairo | Tunisia | Round-robin | Egypt | Kenya | Round-robin | Rwanda | |
| 2011; Details | (Egypt); Cairo | Egypt | Round-robin | Algeria | Tunisia | —N/a | | 3 |
| 2013; Details | (Egypt); Cairo | Egypt | Round-robin | Tunisia | Algeria | Round-robin | Rwanda | 4 |
| 2014; Details | (Algeria); Algiers | Egypt | Round-robin | Tunisia | Algeria | —N/a | | 3 |
| 2016; Details | (Madagascar); Antananarivo | Egypt | Round-robin | Madagascar | Mauritius | —N/a | | 3 |
| 2018; Details | (Egypt); Cairo | Egypt | Round-robin | Cameroon | DR Congo | —N/a | | 3 |
| 2024; Details | (Tunisia); Tunis | Tunisia | 3–2 | Egypt | Morocco | 3–0 | Burundi | |
| 2026; Details | (Egypt); Alexandria | Tunisia | 3–2 | Egypt | Algeria | 3–0 | Cameroon | 6 |

== MVP by edition ==
- 2008 – Marwa Abeidi (TUN)
- 2011 – Aya El Shamy (EGY)
- 2013 – Aya Khalid (EGY)
- 2014 – Nada Meawad (EGY)

2020 U18 Girl’s African Nations Championship 1st to 9th March 2021 – Abuja, Nigeria

Participated Teams and Final Rankings

1. Cameroon - CMR 2. Nigeria - NGR

Round Robin Ranking Rank Matches Result Details Sets Points Total Won Lost 3-0 3-1 3-2 2-3 1-3 0-3 Points Won Lost Set Ratio Won Lost Point Ratio 1 Cameroon 3 3 0 3 0 0 0 0 0 9 9 0 Max 228 177 1.288 2 Nigeria 3 0 3 0 0 0 0 0 3 7 0 9 Min 177 228 0.776

Round Robin Results Number Date Teams Sets Result per set (points) Points Time Audience 1 2 3 4 5 1, 05/03/2021 NGR-CMR 0 - 3 26-28 23-25 17-25 - - 66-78 1:27 2. 07/03/2021 CMR-NGR 3 - 0 25-14 25-14 25-22 - - 75-50 1:15 3. 08/03/2021 NGR-CMR 0 - 3 17-25 21-25 23-25 - - 61-75 1:04

== See also ==
- Men's U19 African Volleyball Championship
