= Eduarda Kraisch =

Brazilian volleyball player (born 1993)

Personal information
- Nationality: Brazilian
- Born: 7 May 1993 (age 33)
- Height: 190 cm (75 in)
- Weight: 58 kg (128 lb)
- Spike: 303 cm (119 in)
- Block: 297 cm (117 in)

Volleyball information
- Position: Outside hitter

National team
2010	Brazil

Eduarda Kraisch (born 7 May 1993) is a Brazilian retired volleyball player. She was part of the Brazil women's national volleyball team.

She participated at the 2010 Women's Pan-American Volleyball Cup.
