= 2014 Girls' Youth African Volleyball Championship =

Tournament details
- Host country: Algeria
- Dates: 7–9 September 2014
- Teams: 4
- Venue: 1 (in Algiers host cities)

Final positions
- Champions: Egypt (5th title)

Tournament awards
- MVP: (Egypt) Nada Meawad

The 2014 Girl's Africa Volleyball Championship happens in Egypt, from 7 to 9 September. The winner qualifies for the 2015 FIVB Girls Youth World Championship.

== Venue ==
- Hacene Harcha Hall, Algiers, Algeria

== Final round ==
=== Classification ===
Pos	Team	Pld	W	L	Pts	SPW	SPL	SPR	SW	SL	SR
1	Egypt	2	2	0	6	173	130	1.331	6	1	6.000
2	Tunisia	2	1	1	3	140	143	0.979	4	3	1.333
3	Algeria	2	0	2	0	112	152	0.737	0	6	0.000

=== Schedule and results ===
Date		Score		Set 1	Set 2	Set 3	Set 4	Set 5	Total	Report
7 Sep	Algeria	0-3	Tunisia	12-25	16-25	19–25			47–75	
8 Sep	Egypt	3–1	Tunisia	21-25	25–12	25–16	25-12		96–65	
9 Sep	Algeria	0-3	Egypt	21-25	25–27	19–25			65–77	

== Awards ==
- Most valuable player
  (Egypt) Nada Meawad
- Best outside spikers
  (Egypt) Nada Meawad
- Best setter
  (Egypt) Reem El Mohand
- Best receiver
  (Algeria) Kahina Bouncer
- Best server
  (Algeria) Bakhta Mazari
- Best middle blockers
  (Tunisia) Nour Bensalem
- Best libero
  (Tunisia) Samar Saafi
