= 2022 Girls' African Nations Volleyball Championship U19 =

Tournament details
- Host country: Nigeria
- City: Abuja
- Dates: 2–5 September 2022
- Teams: 3
- Venue: 1 (in 1 host city)

Final positions
- Champions: Egypt (8th title)
- Runners-up: Cameroon
- Third place: Nigeria

Tournament awards
- MVP: (Egypt) Malak Mohammed Yassin
- Best Libero: (Nigeria) Miriam Usman

Tournament statistics
- Matches played: 4
- Best spiker: (Egypt) Shahd Ehab Mohammed
- Best blocker: (Cameroon) Baran Akoung
- Best server: (Egypt) Maram Amr Ebrahim
- Best setter: (Egypt) Farrid Osama

The 2022 Girls' African Nations Volleyball Championship U19 was the 16th edition of the Girls' Africa Volleyball Championship U19, a biennial international women's volleyball tournament organised by the African Volleyball Confederation (CAVB) for the girls' under-19 national teams of Africa. It was held in Abuja, Nigeria from 2 to 5 September 2022.

This was the first edition to adopt the under-19 format instead of previous under-18, in accordance with the modifications made by the FIVB, which changed the age category of the Girls' Youth World Championship from U18 to U19.

Only three national teams took part in the tournament, with players born on or after 1 January 2005 eligible to participate.

Same as previous editions, the tournament acted as the CAVB qualifiers for the FIVB Volleyball Girls' U19 World Championship. The top two teams qualified for the 2023 FIVB Volleyball Girls' U19 World Championship in Croatia and Hungary as the CAVB representatives

Egypt won their eight title after beating the defending champions Cameroon 3–1 in the final. Both teams qualified for the 2023 FIVB Volleyball Girls' U19 World Championship.

== Venue ==
Nigeria hosted the Girls' African Nations Volleyball Championship U19 for the second time after hosting the previous edition (U18) in 2021. The tournament was entirely played at the Moshood Abiola National Stadium in Abuja.

== Results ==
All match times are in NGT (UTC+6), as listed by CAVB.

=== Group stage ===
Pos	Team	Pld	W	L	Pts	SW	SL	SR	SPW	SPL	SPR	Qualification
1	Egypt	2	2	0	6	6	0	MAX	154	115	1.339	Final
2	Cameroon	2	1	1	3	3	4	0.750	159	162	0.981	Final
3	Nigeria (H)	2	0	2	0	1	6	0.167	141	177	0.797	

Rules for classification: 1) Matches won; 2) Points; 3) Sets Ratio; 4)Points ratio; 5) Head-to-head result.
(H) Host

Date	Time		Score		Set 1	Set 2	Set 3	Set 4	Set 5	Total
2 Sep	17:00	Cameroon	3–1	Nigeria	27-29	25-20	25–14	25-20		102–83
3 Sep	17:00	Nigeria	0–3	Egypt	22-25	14–25	22–25			58–75
4 Sep	17:00	Egypt	3–0	Cameroon	25-15	29–27	25–15			79–57

=== Final ===
Date	Time		Score		Set 1	Set 2	Set 3	Set 4	Set 5	Total
5 Sep	17:00	Egypt	3–1	Cameroon	26-24	25–16	22–25	25-13		98–78

== Individual awards ==
The following individual awards were presented at the end of the tournament.

- Most valuable player

(Egypt) Malak Mohammed Yassin

- Best spiker

(Egypt) Shahd Ehab Mohammed

- Best setter

(Egypt) Farrid Osama

- Best server

(Egypt) Maram Amr Ebrahim

- Best blocker

(Cameroon) Baran Akoung

- Best libero

(Nigeria) Miriam Usman
