= 2014 Men's U23 African Volleyball Championship =

Tournament details
- Host country: Egypt
- Dates: 7–12 November
- Teams: 6
- Venue: 1 (in 1 host city)

Final positions
- Champions: Tunisia (1st title)

Tournament awards
- MVP: (Tunisia) Elias Garfi

The 2014 Men's U23 African Volleyball Championship will be held in Sharm el-Sheikh, Egypt from 7 to 12 November 2014. The top two teams will qualify for the 2015 FIVB Volleyball Men's U23 World Championship.

== Teams ==
The teams are

Round Robin

Algeria
Egypt (Host)
Libya
Morocco
Rwanda
Tunisia

== Round robin ==
| Pos | Team | Pld | W | L | Pts | SW | SL | SR | SPW | SPL | SPR | Qualification |
|---|---|---|---|---|---|---|---|---|---|---|---|---|
| 1 | Tunisia | 5 | 5 | 0 | 15 | 15 | 1 | 15.000 | 398 | 282 | 1.411 | 2015 FIVB Volleyball Men's U23 World Championship |
| 2 | Egypt | 5 | 4 | 1 | 12 | 13 | 3 | 4.333 | 387 | 320 | 1.209 | 2015 FIVB Volleyball Men's U23 World Championship |
| 3 | Algeria | 5 | 2 | 3 | 7 | 8 | 10 | 0.800 | 394 | 405 | 0.973 | |
| 4 | Libya | 5 | 2 | 3 | 5 | 6 | 11 | 0.545 | 357 | 393 | 0.908 | |
| 5 | Rwanda | 5 | 1 | 4 | 3 | 4 | 12 | 0.333 | 315 | 386 | 0.816 | |
| 6 | Morocco | 5 | 1 | 4 | 3 | 4 | 13 | 0.308 | 338 | 403 | 0.839 | |

| Date | Time | | Score | | Set 1 | Set 2 | Set 3 | Set 4 | Set 5 | Total | Report |
|---|---|---|---|---|---|---|---|---|---|---|---|
| 07 Nov | 14:00 | Libya | 0–3 | Rwanda | 20–25 | 24–26 | 21–25 | | | 65–76 | |
| 07 Nov | 16:00 | Morocco | 0–3 | Tunisia | 17–25 | 19–25 | 14–25 | | | 50–75 | |
| 07 Nov | 20:00 | Egypt | 3–0 | Algeria | 25–22 | 25–17 | 25–21 | | | 75–60 | |
| 08 Nov | 16:00 | Rwanda | 0–3 | Tunisia | 18–25 | 21–25 | 14–25 | | | 53–75 | |
| 08 Nov | 18:00 | Algeria | 3–1 | Morocco | 25–20 | 25–18 | 23–25 | 25–17 | | 98–80 | |
| 08 Nov | 20:00 | Libya | 0–3 | Egypt | 17–25 | 22–25 | 19–25 | | | 58–75 | |
| 09 Nov | 16:00 | Tunisia | 3–0 | Algeria | 25–13 | 25–20 | 25–18 | | | 75–51 | |
| 09 Nov | 18:00 | Morocco | 0–3 | Libya | 16–25 | 23–25 | 18–25 | | | 57–75 | |
| 09 Nov | 20:00 | Egypt | 3–0 | Rwanda | 25–16 | 25–16 | 25–17 | | | 75–49 | |
| 11 Nov | 16:00 | Libya | 0–3 | Tunisia | 13–25 | 13–25 | 15–25 | | | 41–75 | |
| 11 Nov | 18:00 | Rwanda | 0–3 | Algeria | 22–25 | 20–25 | 15–25 | | | 57–75 | |
| 11 Nov | 20:00 | Egypt | 3–0 | Morocco | 25–23 | 25–14 | 25–18 | | | 75–55 | |
| 12 Nov | 16:00 | Algeria | 2–3 | Libya | 29–27 | 22–25 | 28–26 | 22–25 | 9–15 | 110–118 | |
| 12 Nov | 18:00 | Morocco | 3–1 | Rwanda | 25–17 | 21–25 | 25–20 | 25–18 | | 96–80 | |
| 12 Nov | 20:00 | Tunisia | 3–1 | Egypt | 25–19 | 25–22 | 23–25 | 25–21 | | 98–87 | |

== Final standing ==
| Rank | Team |
|---|---|
| Gold medal | Tunisia |
| Silver medal | Egypt |
| Bronze medal | Algeria |
| 4 | Libya |
| 5 | Rwanda |
| 6 | Morocco |

| Qualified for the 2015 FIVB Volleyball Men's U23 World Championship |

2014 Men's U23 African champions

Tunisia
First title

Team Roster
Ahmed Guenichi, Khaled Ben Slimene, Oussema Mrika, Mahmoud Chaouch Bouraoui, Malek Chekir, Elyes Garfi, Adem Oueslati, Mohamed Amine Htira, Wassim Ben Tara, Mohamed Brahem, Karim Messelmeni, Tayeb Korbosli

Head Coach: Riadh Hedhili

== Awards ==
- MVP: (Tunisia) Elyes Garfi
- Best spiker: (Tunisia) Adem Oueslati
- Best blocker: (Egypt) Mohamed Adel
- Best server: (Egypt) Ahmed Said
- Best libero: (Rwanda) Peter Bigirimana
- Best setter: (Tunisia) Khaled Ben Slimene
- Best receiver: (Algeria) Larbi Hedroug

== See also ==
- 2014 Women's U23 African Volleyball Championship
