= 2017 Men's U23 African Volleyball Championship =

Tournament details
- Host country: Algeria
- Dates: 20–22 February
- Teams: 2
- Venue: 1 (in 1 host city)

Final positions
- Champions: Algeria (1st title)

The 2017 Men's U23 African Volleyball Championship was the 2nd edition of the Men's U23 African Volleyball Championship, it was held in Algiers, Algeria from 20 to 22 February 2017. The winners Algeria qualified for the 2017 FIVB Volleyball Men's U23 World Championship.

== Participated teams ==
After the cancellation of the 2016 edition in Durban, South Africa, the tournament, held at the last minute by the African Volleyball Confederation (CAVB), brought together only two countries, Algeria and Mauritius.

Round Robin

Algeria (Host)
Mauritius

== Venue ==
All matches
Algiers, Algeria
Douera OMS Hall
Capacity: 1,500

== Round robin ==
Pos	Team	Pld	W	L	Pts	SW	SL	SR	SPW	SPL	SPR	Qualification
1	Algeria	2	2	0	6	6	0	MAX	150	81	1.852	2017 FIVB Volleyball Men's U23 World Championship
2	Mauritius	4	2	2	4	0	6	0.000	81	150	0.540	

Date	Time		Score		Set 1	Set 2	Set 3	Set 4	Set 5	Total	Report
20 Feb	--:--	Mauritius	0–3	Algeria	14–25	8–25	10–25			32–75	
22 Feb	--:--	Algeria	3–0	Mauritius	25–17	25–18	25–14			75–49	

== Final standing ==
Rank	Team
Gold medal	Algeria
Silver medal	Mauritius

Qualified for the 2017 FIVB Volleyball Men's U23 World Championship

2017 Men's U23 African champions

Algeria
First title
