= 2013 Girls' Youth African Volleyball Championship =

Tournament details
- Host country: Egypt
- Dates: 25 – 27 March 2013
- Teams: 4
- Venue: 1 (in Cairo host cities)

Final positions
- Champions: Egypt (4th title)

Tournament awards
- MVP: Aya Khalid (EGY)

The 2013 Girl's Africa Volleyball Championship happens in Egypt, from 25 to 27 March. The top three finishers qualify for the 2013 FIVB Girls Youth World Championship.

== First round ==
- Venue: Army Club Hall, Cairo, Egypt

=== Classifications ===
Pos	Team	Pld	W	L	Pts	SPW	SPL	SPR	SW	SL	SR
1	Egypt	3	3	0	9	225	148	1.520	9	0	MAX
2	Tunisia	3	2	1	6	209	199	1.050	6	4	1.500
3	Algeria	3	1	2	3	230	241	0.954	4	7	0.571
4	Rwanda	3	0	3	0	177	240	0.738	1	9	0.111

Date		Score		Set 1	Set 2	Set 3	Set 4	Set 5	Total	Report
25 March	Algeria	3–1	Rwanda	25–18	25–15	15–25	25–19		90–77	
25 March	Egypt	3–0	Tunisia	25–13	25–16	25–16			75–45	
26 March	Tunisia	3–1	Algeria	25–16	25–18	14–25	25–14		89–73	
26 March	Egypt	3–0	Rwanda	25–16	25–16	25–17			75–49	
27 March	Rwanda	0–3	Tunisia	21–25	15–25	15–25			51–75	
27 March	Algeria	0–3	Egypt	23–25	19–25	16–25			58–75	

== Individual awards ==
- Most valuable player
  - Aya Khalid (EGY)
- Best spiker
  - Sarah Hanafy (EGY)
- Best blocker
  - Heidi Kandel (EGY)
- Best server
  - Jihen Mohamed (TUN)
- Best setter
  - Selma Benmansour (ALG)
- Best receiver
  - Deborah Impanoyimana (RWA)
- Best libero
  - Ryahana Miloud (ALG)
