= Nada Meawad =

Egyptian volleyball player (born 2008)

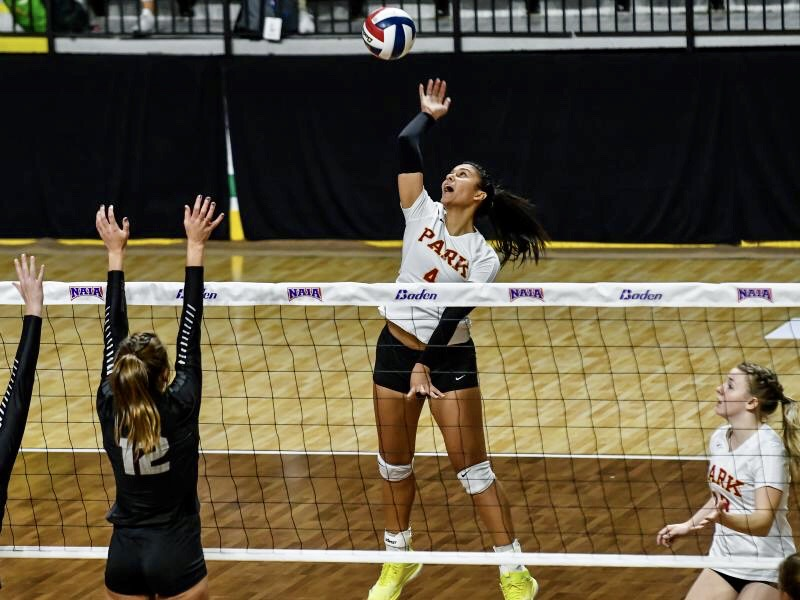
- Nada Meawad attacks in NAIA National Championship 2019

Personal information
- Nationality: Egyptian
- Born: April 12, 2008 (age 18) cairo
- Hometown: Cairo, Egypt
- Height: 182 cm (6 ft 0 in)
- Weight: 71 kg (157 lb)
- Spike: 290 cm (110 in)
- Block: 280 cm (110 in)
- Education: Park University

Beach volleyball information
Years	Teammate
2016	Doaa Elghobashy

Indoor volleyball information
- Position: Outside hitter
- Current club: Béziers Volley
- Number: 7

Career
Years	Teams
2015–2017	(Egypt) El Shams Club
2017-2021	(United States) Park Pirates
2021-2023	(Switzerland) Volley Lugano
2023-2024	(Switzerland) Volley Düdingen
2024- present	(France) Béziers Volley

National team
2013-present	Egypt
Medal record
Volleyball
FIVB Nations League
Bronze medal – third place	2015 Brazzaville	Team Egypt
Silver medal – second place	2023 Women's African Nations Volleyball Championship	Team Egypt
Gold medal – first place	2026 Women's African Nations Volleyball Championship	Team Egypt

Nada Meawad (Arabic: ندى معوض; born April 12, 1998) is an Egyptian indoor and beach volleyball player, a member of the Egypt women's national volleyball team. She made her international debut when she was 15 years old on the 2013 FIVB Volleyball Girls' U18 World Championship in Thailand. She started playing in El Shams Club at the age of five years old. Nada Meawad and her teammate Doaa Elghobashy were the first ever African team to take part in the FIVB beach volleyball Olympic Games in 2016. She is a Five-time AVCA First Team All-American and Three-time NAIA Player of the Year 2018, 2020 and 2021 while playing college volleyball at Park University.

== Career ==
=== Biography ===
Meawad was born to Hossameldin Meawad and Eman Helmi and grew up in Cairo, Egypt. Coming from a volleyball family she showed interest for the game from an early age. She attended Ibn El-Nafees High school and graduated in 2017, while she played volleyball in El Shams Sporting Club following the footsteps of her siblings.

=== College ===
Meawad started her college volleyball career in 2017 at Park University in Parkville Missouri of U.S.A, she was admitted to Park with a full scholarship together with her twin sister Noura that also plays volleyball for Park University. That year, she was named the American Volleyball Coaches Association NAIA Freshman of the Year 2017. AVCA NAIA First Team All-American, AVCA NAIA Midwest Region Freshman and Player of the Year, 2017. American Midwest Conference Freshman and Player of the Year. She helped Park to a record of 33-4 and an appearance in the NAIA Volleyball Championship national quarterfinals.

In 2018, she led the Pirates to 34-1 and the NAIA Volleyball Championship national title, she was named the MVP and All Tournament Team NAIA National Championship 2018. NAIA All-American First Team and NAIA Player of the Year 2018.

In 2019 she led the Pirates in 32–4, they won the Conference Championship and reached the quarterfinals in the National Championship, Meawad made the AVCA All-American First Team and All-Tournament Team in NAIA National Championship .

In 2020 she led the Team and won the Conference championship. She was the Player of the year in the Conference, Region and the National Player of the Year. She made her 4th Time First Team All-American.

After an unexpected year of eligibility due to COVID-19 pandemic she returned in 2021 to Park University for another season and she led the team to Heart of America Conference Championship and play in the finals of The NAIA National Championship where they were Runner Up. She was named best Attacker and 2021 NAIA player of the year.

== Club career ==
Meawad was playing for El Shams Volleyball Club since she was 5 years old. She participated for the first time with the senior team of the club in 2015 Women's African Clubs Championship (volleyball) held in Egypt. El Shams ended in the 4th place. In 2016 El Shams ended in the 5th place in Women's African Clubs Championship (volleyball) CAVB in Tunisia. In 2017 El Shams won the 2nd place after beating Al Ahly team 3–2 in a historic win and qualified for the finals in the Women's African Clubs Championship (volleyball). Meawad got awarded with the Most Valuable Player award.

After she finished her studies in the United States she signed her first contract in Volley Lugano in Switzerland where she played 2 seasons and led the Luganese Team in historical silver medal in the Swiss Cup and bronze medals in VNL League 2022–2023.

In 2023–2024 she transferred to Swiss volleyball team Dudingen and she led the team as Top Scorer in Swiss Super Cup with silver medal.

Volleyball Dudingen finished second with silver medal in VNL League 2023–2024 season .

In 2024–2025 season she transferred to French volleyball team Béziers.

== Olympic Games ==
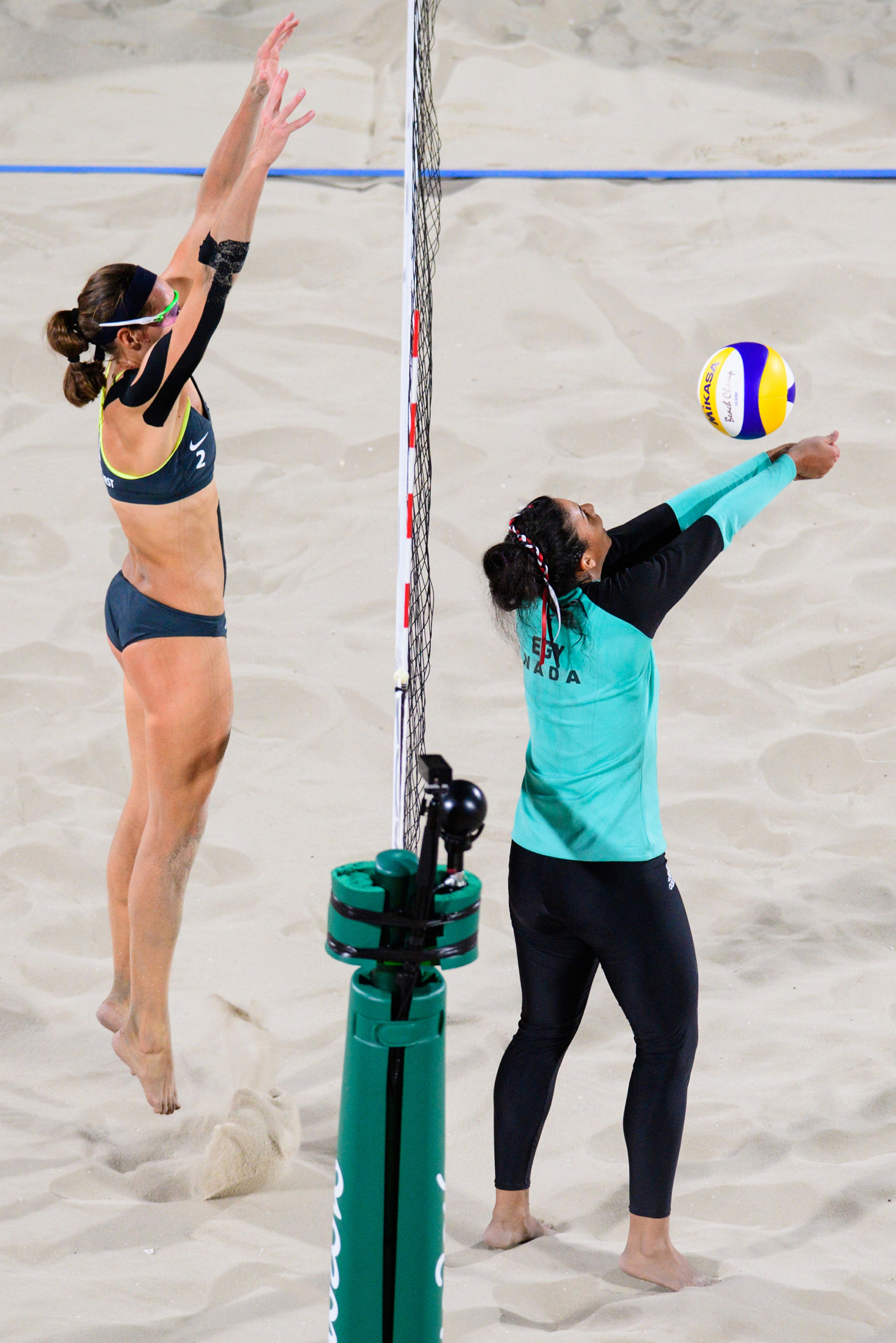
Egypt's Nada Meawad bumps in Rio 2016 Olympic Games

With her partner Doaa Elghobashy, she qualified in beach volleyball for the 2016 Summer Olympics in Rio de Janeiro by winning the CAVB Continental Cup held in Nigeria. Elghobashi and Meawad competed with different partners in helping Egypt to secure a berth in Rio. Doaa played with Lamies Nossier and Nada with Randa Radwan. Egypt posted a 5–0 record in the mid-April African Continental Cup finals in Abuja, Nigeria. With early wins over teams from Morocco, Mozambique, Namibia, and Nigeria, the Egyptians defeated Rwanda 2–1 in the finals. Meawad and Elghobashi played in their 1st FIVB Beach Volleyball World Tour tournament together. With no previous FIVB World Tour events played, Doaa and Nada was the first team from Egypt in the history to compete in the Olympic Games for beach volleyball. Nada was the youngest women's player to compete in any of the six Olympic Games at 18 years, 3 months.

=== Results Pool-D ===
The pair played in Pool-D at the 2016 Summer Olympics.

- Ludwig / Walkenhorst (Germany) (0: 2)
- Menegatti / Giombini (Italy) (0: 2)
- Broder / Valjas (Canada) (0: 2)

== Awards ==
=== Individual ===
- 2014 Girls' Youth African Volleyball Championship "Most valuable player” and "Best spiker”
- Women's African Clubs Championship (volleyball), 2017 Most Valuable Player
- 2026 Women's African Nations Volleyball Championship, Best Outside Hitter

=== Clubs ===
- Women's African Clubs Championship (volleyball) 2017 – Silver Medal, with El Shams Club
- Swiss Women's Volleyball League 2022/23 - Bronze Medal, with Volley Lugano
- Swiss Women's Volleyball Cup 2022/23 - Silver Medal, with Volley Lugano
- Swiss Super Cup 2023 - Silver Medal, with Volley Dudingen
- Swiss Women's Volleyball League 2023/24 - Silver Medal, with Volley Dudingen

=== College ===
- Three-time NAIA Player of the Year (2018, 2020,2021 )
- Five-time First Team AVCA All-American (2017, 2019, 2019, 2020, 2021)
- Five-time NAIA National Attacker of the Week, (Sep 2.2018, Nov 3. 2020, Nov 10.2020, Aug 31.2021, Nov 2.2021 )
- Attacker of the Tournament NAIA Women's Volleyball Championship 2021
- MVP, NAIA National Championship 2018
- Three-time NAIA Championship All-Tournament Team (2018, 2019,2021)
- Four - time AVCA NAIA Midwest Regional Player of the Year (2017, 2018, 2020,2021 )
- Five -time AVCA NAIA Midwest Regional First Team (2017, 2018, 2019, 2020,2021 )
- 2017 AVCA NAIA Freshman of the Year
- 2017 AVCA NAIA Midwest Regional Freshman of the Year
- Two-time First Team Heart of America Conference 2020,2021.
- Three-time First Team American Midwest Conference (2017, 2018, 2019)
- Two-time Heart of America Player of the Year (2020,2021)
- Two-time American Midwest Conference Player of the Year (2017, 2018)
- 2017 American Midwest Conference Freshman of the Year
- Two-time American Midwest Conference First Team Academic (2018, 2019)
- 2018 Google Cloud Academic All-American
- Two-time Google Cloud Academic All-District (2018, 2019)
- Two-time Park University Female Athlete of The Year (2018, 2019)
