= Ege Melisa Bükmen =

Turkish volleyball player (born 2004)

Personal information
- Born: 24 February 2004 (age 22) Ankara, Turkey
- Height: 181 cm (5 ft 11 in)
- Weight: 68 kg (150 lb)
- Spike: 308 cm (121 in)
- Block: 285 cm (112 in)

Volleyball information
- Position: Outside hiiter
- Current club: Galatasaray
- Number: 4

Career
- Years: Team
- 2019–2020; 2019–2022; 2020–2022; 2022–2023; 2023–2024; 2024–2025; 2025–2026; 2026–: VakıfBank U16; VakıfBank II; VakıfBank U18; Karayolları; Prometey; Nilüfer Bld.; Kuzeyboru; Galatasaray
Honours
Women's volleyball
Representing Turkey

Ege Melisa Bükmen (born 24 February 2004) is a Turkish professional volleyball player.

She plays in the outside hitter position for Galatasaray, and played in various Turkey women's youth and junior teans before she became a member of the Turkey women's national volleyball team.

She plays in the outside hitter position, and is 181 cm (5 ft 11 1/2 in) tall at 68 kg (150 lb). She has 308 cm (121 in) spike and 285 cm (112 in) block height.

== Club career ==
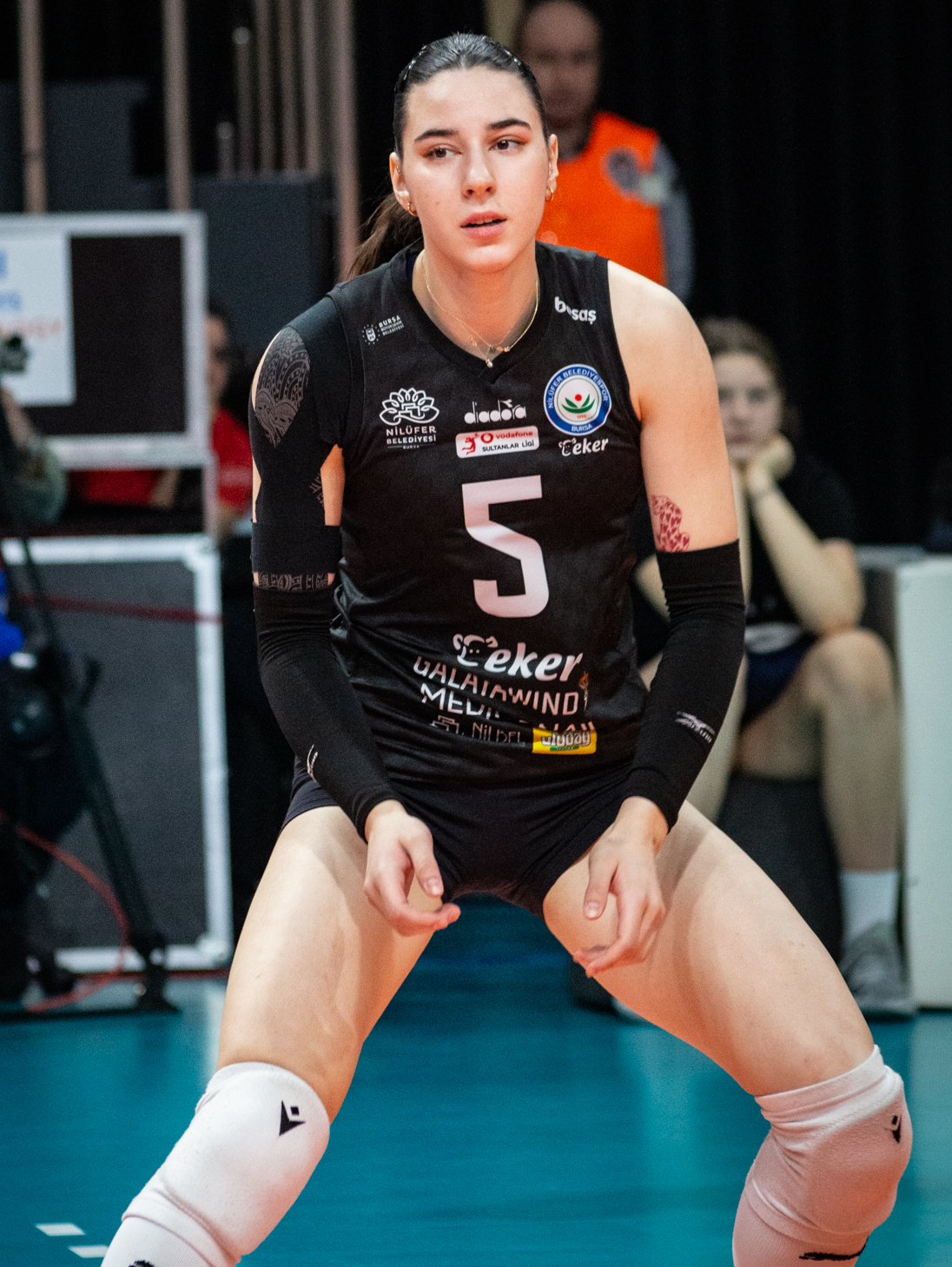
Ege Melisa Bükmen of Nilüfer Bld. (2025)

Bükmen started her volleyball playing career entering VakıfBank in Istanbul. She then played for Karayolları before she moved to Ukraine and signed with Prometey. Her team became league champion and winner of two cups. She was named Best Outside Hitter. Returned home, she joined the Bursa-based club Nilüfer Bld.. In April 2025, she transferred to Kuzeyboru in Aksaray.

On July 23, 2026, she signed a one-year contract with Galatasaray.

== International career ==
Bükmen won champions titles with the Turkey U16 and U18 teams as well as bronze medals with the Turkey U21 and U23 teams at European Championships.

She was part of the Turkey women's national volleyball team at the 2025 Islamic Solidarity Games in Riyadh, Saudi Arabia, which became champion.

== Personal life ==
Ege Melisa Bükmen was born in Ankara, Turkey on 24 February 2004.

== Honours ==
=== Club ===
Karayolları

Turkish Women's Volleyball First League
(silver) (1): 2022–23

VakıfBank

Turkish Women's Volleyball Second League
(silver) (1): 2019–20
Turkish Women's U18 Volleyball Championships
(gold) (1): 2021–22

Istanbul Women's Vollwyball U18 Super League
(bronze) (1): 2021–22

Nilüfer Bld.

Women's Volleyball Republic Cup
(silver) (1): 2024–25

Prometey

Ukrainian Women's Volleyball Super League
(gold) (1): 2023–24

Ukrainian Women's Volleyball Cup
(gold) (1): 2023–24

Ukrainian Women's Volleyball Super Cup
(gold) (1): 2023–24

=== International ===
Turkey women's U16

CEV Women's U16 Volleyball European Championship
(gold) (1): 2019

Turkey women's U17
CEV Women's U17 Volleyball European Championship
(silver) (1): 2020

Turkey women's U18

Balkan Women's U18 Volleyball Championship Cup
(silver) (1): 2022

Turkey women's U19

CEV Women's U20 Volleyball European Championship
(gold) (1): 2020

European Youth Summer Olympic Festival
(silver) (1): 2022

Turkey women's U20

CEV Women's U21 Volleyball European Championship
(bronze) (1): 2022

Turkey women's U23

CEV Women's U22 Volleyball European Championship
(bronze) (1): 2024

Turkey women's

Islamic Solidarity Games
(gold) (1): 2025

=== Individual ===
Best Outside Hitter

2024 Ukrainian Women's Volleyball Cup (Prometey)
