= Begüm Kaçmaz =

Turkish volleyball player (born 2007)

- Begüm Kaçmaz of Beşiktaş (2024)

Personal information
- Nationality: Turkey
- Born: 26 April 2007 (age 19); Ankara, Turkey
- Height: 188 cm (6 ft 2 in)
- Weight: 65 kg (143 lb)
- Spike: 296 cm (117 in)
- Block: 270 cm (110 in)

Volleyball information
- Position: Middle blocker
- Current club: Nilüfer Bld.

Career
Years
- 2019–2020
- 2021–2022
- 2023–2024
- 2024–2025
- 2020–2026
- 2025–2026
- 2026–
Teams
- İlBank U16
- VakıfBank II
- VakıfBank
- →Beşiktaş
- VakıfBank U18
- Il Bisonte Firenze
- Nilüfer Bld.
→

National team
- 2021–2023
- 2021–2025
- 2024
- 2026
- Turkey U17
- Turkey U19
- Turkey U21
- Turkey
Honours
Women's volleyball
Representing Turkey
Mediterranean Games
Gold medal – first place	2026 Taranto	Team
CEV Women's U20 European Championship
Gold medal – first place	2024 Sofia	Team U20
FIVB Girls' U19 World Championship
Silver medal – second place	2023 Osijek	Team U19
CEV Women's U16 European Championship
Silver medal – second place	2023 Vrnjačka Banja	Team U17
Balkan Championships
Bronze medal – third place	2022 Vranje	Team U17
Silver medal – second place	2021 Belgrade	Team U19

Begüm Kaçmaz (born 26 April 2007) is a Turkish profeessional volleyball player. She is 188 cm (6 ft 2 in) tall at 65 kg (143 lb) and plays in the middle blocker position. She has 296 cm (117 in) spike height and 270 cm (110 in) block height. She plays for Nilüfer Bld.. She was part of the national U17, U19 and U21 teams before she played for the Turkey team.

== Club career ==
Kaçmaz started her volleyball career in the youth systen of the Ankara-based club İlBank U16 in 2019. Her early talent led her to move to Istanbul at just twelve years old to join the VakıfBank youth system to play for the U18 team in the 2020–21 season. In the 2021–22 season, she debuted in the Second League with VakıfBank II. Her outstanding performance earned her a place in o the VakıfBank A-team. Her team won the 2023 Turkish Super Cup, and she played for the first time in the topflight Sultans League in the 2023–24 season. At the end of the season, her team took the third place. The next season, she was loaned out to Beşiktaş, to continue her development after gaining experience at VakıfBank. In April 2025, she moved to Italy, and signed with Il Bisonte Firenze to play in the top 2025–26 Italian Women's Volleyball League. In May 2026, she announced that she left VakıfBank after a membership of six years. She lastly joined Nilüfer Bld. in Bursa.

== International career ==
=== Turkey U17 ===
By age fourteen in 2021, Kaçmaz earned her first national youth team call-ups in the Turkey U17 team. She competed at the 2021 Girls' U16 European Championshi in Nyíregyháza, Hungary, which ended with fourth place. She took the bronze medal at the 2022 Balkan Women's U17 Championships in Vranje, Serbia. She won the silver medal at the 2022 Girls' U17 European Championship in the Czech Republic, and was named one of the "Best Middle Blocker"s. At the 2023 Women's U17 European Championship in Vrnjačka Banja, Serbia, she won another silver medal, and was named one of the "Best Middle Blocker"s.

=== Turkey U19 ===
She was invited to the Turkey U19 team, and received the silver medal at the 2021 Balkan Women's U19 Volleyball Championships in Belgrade, Serbia. She won another silver medal at the 2023 FIVB Girls' U19 World Championship in Osijek, Croatia, and was named one of the "Best Middle Blocker's. She was part of the U19 team, which lost the bronze-medal match at the 2025 FIVB Girls' U19 World Championship in Osijek, Croatia. She captained the national U19 team.

=== Turkey U21 ===
With the Turkey U21 team, she won the gold medal at the 2024 Women's U20 European Championship in Sofia, Bulgaria.

=== Turkey ===
As part of the Turkey women's team, she captured the gold medal at the 2026 Mediterranean Games in Taranto, Italy.

== Personal life ==
Begüm Kaçmaz was born in Ankara, Turkey on 26 April 2007.

== Honours ==
=== Club ===
Sultans League
(bronze) (1): VakıfBank (2023–24)

Turkish Super Cup
(gold) (1): VakıfBank (2023)

=== Individual ===
Best Middle Blocker (3)
1. . 2022 Girls' U17 European Championship
2. . 2023 Women's U17 European Championship
3. . 2023 FIVB Girls' U19 World Championship
