= 2025 Women's U16 European Volleyball Championship =

Tournament details
- Host country: Albania; Kosovo
- Dates: 2–13 July 2025
- Teams: 16
- Venues: 2 (in 2 host cities)

Final positions
- Champions: Poland (1st title)
- Runners-up: Turkey
- Third place: Italy

The 2025 Women's U16 European Volleyball Championship was the fifth edition of the CEV Women's U16 Volleyball European Championship, a biennial international volleyball tournament organized by the European Volleyball Confederation (CEV) for the under-16 girls' national teams of Europe. The tournament was held in Albania and Kosovo from 2 to 31 July 2025.

== Qualification ==
Means of qualification		Qualifier
Host countries		Albania
Host countries		Kosovo
Qualification 1st round	BVA	Turkey
Qualification 1st round	EEVZA	Poland
Qualification 1st round	MEVZA	Hungary
Qualification 1st round	WEVZA	France
Qualification 2nd round	Pool A	Montenegro
Qualification 2nd round	Pool A	Slovenia
Qualification 2nd round	Pool B	Czech Republic
Qualification 2nd round	Pool C	Greece
Qualification 2nd round	Pool C	Croatia
Qualification 2nd round	Pool D	Bulgaria
Qualification 2nd round	Pool D	Lithuania
Qualification 2nd round	Pool D	Ukraine
Qualification 2nd round	Pool E	Italy
Qualification 2nd round	Pool E	Spain

== Venues ==
Pool I, Final round		Pool II	
Tirana Olympic Park, Albania	2025 Women's U16 European Volleyball Championship is located in Albania	Palace of Youth and Sports, Kosovo	2025 Women's U16 European Volleyball Championship is located in Kosovo
TBD	2025 Women's U16 European Volleyball Championship is located in Albania	TBD	2025 Women's U16 European Volleyball Championship is located in Kosovo
Capacity: 1.200	2025 Women's U16 European Volleyball Championship is located in Albania	Capacity: 2.000	2025 Women's U16 European Volleyball Championship is located in Kosovo

== Pools composition ==
The drawing of lots was combined with a seeding of National Federations and performed as follows:

1. The two organisers were seeded in Preliminary pools. Albania in Pool I and Kosovo in Pool II.
2. Remaining 14 participating teams drawn after they were previously placed in five cups as per their position in the latest European Ranking

Pot 1	Pot 2	Pot 3	Pot 4	Pot 5	Pot 6	Pot 7
Italy (1); Turkey (2)	Bulgaria (3); Croatia (4)	Poland (4); Hungary (7)	France (13); Slovenia (9)	Ukraine (17); Czech Republic (13)	Lithuania (24); Greece (21)	Spain (26); Montenegro (30)

Result

The drawing of lots was held on 29 April 2025.

Pool I	Pool II
Poland	Turkey
Bulgaria	Hungary
Ukraine	Czech Republic
Albania	Kosovo
Italy	Croatia
Lithuania	Montenegro
Spain	Slovenia
France	Greece

== Preliminary round ==
=== Pool I ===
Pos	Team	Pld	W	L	Pts	SW	SL	SR	SPW	SPL	SPR	Qualification
1	Italy	7	7	0	21	21	4	5.250	605	459	1.318	Semifinals and 2026 FIVB U17 World Championship
2	Poland	7	6	1	18	19	4	4.750	556	407	1.366	Semifinals and 2026 FIVB U17 World Championship
3	Spain	7	4	3	13	14	12	1.167	568	519	1.094	2026 FIVB U17 World Championship
4	France	7	4	3	12	15	10	1.500	567	503	1.127	
5	Bulgaria	7	3	4	8	11	14	0.786	509	543	0.937	
6	Ukraine	7	2	5	7	10	17	0.588	527	607	0.868	
7	Lithuania	7	2	5	5	7	18	0.389	500	583	0.858	
8	Albania (H)	7	0	7	0	3	21	0.143	379	590	0.642	

(H) Host

Date	Time		Score		Set 1	Set 2	Set 3	Set 4	Set 5	Total	Report
2 Jul	12:30	Ukraine	2–3	Bulgaria	25–21	19–25	22–25	25–19	12–15	103–105	Report
2 Jul	15:00	France	1–3	Poland	25–15	22–25	22–25	24–26		93–91	Report
2 Jul	17:30	Albania	0–3	Spain	12–25	8–25	16–25			36–75	Report
2 Jul	20:00	Lithuania	0–3	Italy	25–27	17–25	16–25			58–77	Report
3 Jul	12:30	Spain	0–3	Poland	15–25	22–25	7–25			44–75	Report
3 Jul	15:00	Bulgaria	0–3	France	17–25	19–25	16–25			52–75	Report
3 Jul	17:30	Albania	1–3	Lithuania	20-25	22–25	25–21	12–25		79–71	Report
3 Jul	20:00	Italy	3–1	Ukraine	25–14	25–12	22–25	25–13		97–64	Report
4 Jul	12:30	Lithuania	3–2	Spain	22–25	21–25	25–23	25–20	15–12	108–105	Report
4 Jul	15:00	France	1–3	Italy	25–21	18–25	18–25	19–25		80–96	Report
4 Jul	17:30	Ukraine	3–1	Albania	21–25	25–18	25–14	25–17		96–74	Report
4 Jul	20:00	Poland	3–0	Bulgaria	25–18	25–21	25–15			75–54	Report
6 Jul	12:30	Lithuania	1–3	Ukraine	18–25	25–20	21–25	23–25		87–95	Report
6 Jul	15:00	Italy	3–1	Poland	25–18	13–25	26–24	25–23		89–90	Report
6 Jul	17:30	Albania	1–3	France	25–23	20–25	11–25	18–25		74–98	Report
6 Jul	20:00	Spain	3–1	Bulgaria	21–25	25–13	25–12	25–16		96–66	Report
7 Jul	12:30	France	3–0	Lithuania	25–15	25–16	25–16			75–47	Report
7 Jul	15:00	Ukraine	1–3	Spain	18–25	25–18	24–26	21–25		88–94	Report
7 Jul	17:30	Poland	3–0	Albania	25–12	25–15	25–15			75–42	Report
7 Jul	20:00	Bulgaria	1–3	Italy	14–25	25–21	22–25	19–25		80–96	Report
9 Jul	12:30	Spain	0–3	Italy	13–25	21–25	22–25			56–75	Report
9 Jul	15:00	Lithuania	0–3	Poland	16–25	22–25	11–25			49–75	Report
9 Jul	17:30	Albania	0–3	Bulgaria	18–25	6–25	19–25			43–75	Report
9 Jul	20:00	Ukraine	0–3	France	15–25	16–25	14–25			45–75	Report
10 Jul	12:30	Bulgaria	3–0	Lithuania	25–17	25–13	27–25			77–55	Report
10 Jul	15:00	Poland	3–0	Ukraine	25–16	25–10	25–10			75–36	Report
10 Jul	17:30	Italy	3–0	Albania	25–16	25–10	25–5			75–31	Report
10 Jul	20:00	France	1–3	Spain	16–25	10–25	25–23	20–25		71–98	Report

=== Pool II ===
Pos	Team	Pld	W	L	Pts	SW	SL	SR	SPW	SPL	SPR	Qualification
1	Czech Republic	7	6	1	17	20	7	2.857	620	549	1.129	Semifinals and 2026 FIVB U17 World Championship
2	Turkey	7	5	2	16	19	8	2.375	632	519	1.218	Semifinals and 2026 FIVB U17 World Championship
3	Croatia	7	4	3	13	14	10	1.400	545	458	1.190	2026 FIVB U17 World Championship
4	Greece	7	4	3	12	15	11	1.364	561	511	1.098	
5	Montenegro	7	3	4	9	13	16	0.813	622	613	1.015	
6	Hungary	7	3	4	9	11	14	0.786	506	518	0.977	
7	Slovenia	7	3	4	8	11	16	0.688	555	600	0.925	
8	Kosovo (H)	7	0	7	0	0	21	0.000	252	525	0.480	

(H) Host

Date	Time		Score		Set 1	Set 2	Set 3	Set 4	Set 5	Total	Report
2 Jul	12:30	Slovenia	0–3	Hungary	16–25	22–25	23–25			61–75	Report
2 Jul	15:00	Greece	0–3	Turkey	13–25	17–25	21–25			51–75	Report
2 Jul	17:30	Czech Republic	3–0	Croatia	27–25	25–23	25–13			77–61	Report
2 Jul	20:00	Kosovo	0–3	Montenegro	15–25	12–25	6–25			33–75	Report
3 Jul	12:30	Turkey	2–3	Czech Republic	25–16	30–28	19–25	24–26	11–15	109–110	Report
3 Jul	15:00	Montenegro	2–3	Hungary	17–25	25–20	25–15	18–25	9–15	94–100	Report
3 Jul	17:30	Croatia	3–0	Slovenia	25–18	25–14	25–15			75–47	Report
3 Jul	20:00	Kosovo	0–3	Greece	9–25	4–25	11–25			24–75	Report
4 Jul	12:30	Hungary	0–3	Croatia	13–25	14–25	20–25			47–75	Report
4 Jul	15:00	Greece	3–0	Montenegro	25–19	25–20	25–17			75–56	Report
4 Jul	17:30	Slovenia	0–3	Turkey	18–25	24–26	16–25			58–76	Report
4 Jul	20:00	Czech Republic	3–0	Kosovo	25–11	25–12	25–16			75–39	Report
6 Jul	12:30	Montenegro	3–2	Croatia	24–26	27–25	25–21	23–25	15–12	114–109	Report
6 Jul	15:00	Greece	2–3	Czech Republic	28–30	25–17	21–25	25–13	13–15	112–100	Report
6 Jul	17:30	Turkey	3–2	Hungary	25–17	25–12	17–25	19–25	15–11	101–90	Report
6 Jul	20:00	Kosovo	0–3	Slovenia	17–25	8–25	19–25			44–75	Report
7 Jul	12:30	Czech Republic	3–0	Montenegro	25–19	25–22	25–17			75–58	Report
7 Jul	15:00	Slovenia	2–3	Greece	22–25	25–22	23–25	25–22	11–15	106–109	Report
7 Jul	17:30	Croatia	0–3	Turkey	16–25	21–25	20–25			57–75	Report
7 Jul	20:00	Hungary	3–0	Kosovo	25–7	25–18	25–7			75–32	Report
9 Jul	12:30	Czech Republic	2–3	Slovenia	22–25	23–25	25–21	25–22	13–15	108–108	Report
9 Jul	15:00	Montenegro	3–2	Turkey	34–32	12–25	28–26	23–25	15–13	112–121	Report
9 Jul	17:30	Greece	3–0	Hungary	25–16	30–28	25–13			80–57	Report
9 Jul	20:00	Kosovo	0–3	Croatia	15–25	15–25	9–25			39–75	Report
10 Jul	12:30	Slovenia	3–2	Montenegro	25–22	15–25	15–25	29–27	16–14	100–113	Report
10 Jul	15:00	Croatia	3–1	Greece	25–10	18–25	25–10	25–14		93–59	Report
10 Jul	17:30	Hungary	0–3	Czech Republic	16–25	23–25	23–25			62–75	Report
10 Jul	20:00	Turkey	3–0	Kosovo	25–14	25–14	25–13			75–41	Report

== Final round ==
Semifinals
12 July
A1 Italy	2
B2 Turkey	3
12 July
B1 Czech Republic	1
A2 Poland	3

Final
13 July
B2 Turkey	1
A2 Poland	3
3rd-place match
13 July
A1 Italy	3
B1 Czech Republic	0

=== Semifinals ===
Date	Time		Score		Set 1	Set 2	Set 3	Set 4	Set 5	Total	Report
12 Jul	16:00	Italy	2–3	Turkey	25–17	25–17	23–25	19–25	6–15	98–99	
12 Jul	19:00	Czech Republic	1–3	Poland	25–23	21–25	20–25	10–25		76–98	

=== 3rd-place match ===
Date	Time		Score		Set 1	Set 2	Set 3	Set 4	Set 5	Total	Report
13 Jul	16:00	Italy	3–0	Czech Republic	25–16	25–16	25–13			75–45	

=== Final ===
Date	Time		Score		Set 1	Set 2	Set 3	Set 4	Set 5	Total	Report
13 Jul	19:00	Turkey	1–3	Poland	22–25	28–26	22–25	23–25		95–101	

== Final standings ==
Rank	Team
1st place, gold medalist(s)	Poland
2nd place, silver medalist(s)	Turkey
3rd place, bronze medalist(s)	Italy
4	Czech Republic
5	Croatia
6	Spain
7	France
8	Greece
9	Montenegro
10	Bulgaria
11	Hungary
12	Ukraine
13	Slovenia
14	Lithuania
15	Albania
16	Kosovo

Qualified for the 2026 FIVB Volleyball Girls' U17 World Championship

2025 CEV U16 Women's volleyball European champions

Poland
1st title

== Awards ==
At the conclusion of the tournament, the following players were selected as the tournament dream team.

- Most valuable player
- (Poland) Alexsandra Wika
- Best setter
- (Czech Republic) Anna Prokešová
- Best outside spikers
- (Poland) Zuzanna Lange
- (Turkey) Ecrin Selis Türkyaşar
- Best middle blockers
- (Turkey) Nejla Guzonjic
- (Poland) Gabriela Jakubowska
- Best opposite spiker
- (Poland) Elżbieta Czerwonka
- Best libero
- (Italy) Kaila Simeonov
