= 2017 Girls' U16 European Volleyball Championship =

Tournament details
- Host country: Bulgaria
- Dates: 21–29 July 2017
- Teams: 12
- Venues: 2 (in 2 host cities)

Final positions
- Champions: Italy (1st title)

Tournament awards
- MVP: (Russia) Tatiana Kadochkina

The 2017 Girls' U16 European Volleyball Championship was the inaugural edition of the Girls' U16 European Volleyball Championship, a biennial international volleyball tournament organised by the European Volleyball Confederation (CEV) the girls' under-16 national teams of Europe. The tournament was held in Bulgaria from 21 to 29 July 2017.

== Qualification ==
Means of qualification		Qualifier
Host country		Bulgaria
Qualification 1st round	BVA	Turkey
Qualification 1st round	EEVZA	Russia
Qualification 1st round	MEVZA	Czech Republic
Qualification 1st round	NEVZA	Finland
Qualification 1st round	WEVZA	Italy
Qualification 2nd round	Pool A	Belarus
Qualification 2nd round	Pool B	Greece
Qualification 2nd round	Pool C	Belgium
Qualification 2nd round	Pool D	Netherlands
Qualification 2nd round	Best runner ups	Denmark
Qualification 2nd round	Best runner ups	Romania

== Venues ==
Pool I, classification matches, final round		Pool II	
Sofia, Bulgaria	Sofia is located in Bulgaria	Samokov, Bulgaria	Samokov is located in Bulgaria
Hristo Botev Hall	Sofia is located in Bulgaria	Arena Samokov	Samokov is located in Bulgaria
Capacity: 1,500	Sofia is located in Bulgaria	Capacity: 2,500	Samokov is located in Bulgaria

== Preliminary round ==
=== Pool I ===
Pos	Team	Pld	W	L	Pts	SW	SL	SR	SPW	SPL	SPR	Qualification
1	Italy	5	5	0	15	15	1	15.000	398	255	1.561	Semifinals
2	Bulgaria	5	4	1	12	13	3	4.333	373	357	1.045	Semifinals
3	Netherlands	5	3	2	9	9	7	1.286	371	349	1.063	5th–8th semifinals
4	Greece	5	1	4	3	5	13	0.385	377	427	0.883	5th–8th semifinals
5	Finland	5	1	4	3	4	12	0.333	348	370	0.941	
6	Denmark	5	1	4	3	3	13	0.231	280	389	0.720	

Date	Time		Score		Set 1	Set 2	Set 3	Set 4	Set 5	Total	Report
21 Jul	15:00	Greece	1–3	Denmark	25–27	16–25	25–12	22–25		88–89	Report
21 Jul	17:30	Bulgaria	1–3	Italy	17–25	25–21	10–25	12–25		64–96	Report
21 Jul	20:00	Finland	0–3	Netherlands	22–25	19–25	21–25			62–75	Report
22 Jul	15:00	Italy	3–0	Denmark	25–14	25–10	25–11			75–35	Report
22 Jul	17:30	Bulgaria	3–0	Finland	30–28	25–20	28–26			83–74	Report
22 Jul	20:00	Netherlands	3–1	Greece	25–17	25–21	23–25	25–23		98–86	Report
23 Jul	15:00	Finland	0–3	Italy	12–25	12–25	24–26			48–76	Report
23 Jul	17:30	Greece	0–3	Bulgaria	23–25	15–25	21–25			59–75	Report
23 Jul	20:00	Denmark	0–3	Netherlands	13–25	21–25	17–25			51–75	Report
25 Jul	15:00	Finland	1–3	Greece	18–25	25–16	21–25	25–27		89–93	Report
25 Jul	17:30	Bulgaria	3–0	Denmark	25–20	26–24	25–18			76–62	Report
25 Jul	20:00	Italy	3–0	Netherlands	25–21	25–22	25–14			75–57	Report
26 Jul	15:00	Denmark	0–3	Finland	21–25	16–25	6–25			43–75	Report
26 Jul	17:30	Greece	0–3	Italy	24–26	9–25	18–25			51–76	Report
26 Jul	20:00	Netherlands	0–3	Bulgaria	23–25	22–25	21–25			66–75	Report

=== Pool II ===
Pos	Team	Pld	W	L	Pts	SW	SL	SR	SPW	SPL	SPR	Qualification
1	Russia	5	4	1	11	14	7	2.000	463	372	1.245	Semifinals
2	Belarus	5	4	1	9	13	9	1.444	457	444	1.029	Semifinals
3	Turkey	5	3	2	10	12	8	1.500	443	428	1.035	5th–8th semifinals
4	Romania	5	3	2	10	13	10	1.300	474	457	1.037	5th–8th semifinals
5	Czech Republic	5	1	4	4	6	13	0.462	386	429	0.900	
6	Belgium	5	0	5	1	4	15	0.267	348	441	0.789	

Date	Time		Score		Set 1	Set 2	Set 3	Set 4	Set 5	Total	Report
21 Jul	15:00	Belgium	1–3	Romania	22–25	26–24	14–25	11–25		73–99	Report
21 Jul	17:30	Belarus	3–0	Czech Republic	25–23	25–16	25–17			75–56	Report
21 Jul	20:00	Russia	3–2	Turkey	25–10	23–25	20–25	25–23	15–11	108–94	Report
22 Jul	15:00	Czech Republic	2–3	Romania	19–25	17–25	25–15	25–19	13–15	99–99	Report
22 Jul	17:30	Belarus	3–2	Russia	25–23	25–16	15–25	16–25	17–15	98–104	Report
22 Jul	20:00	Turkey	3–0	Belgium	25–15	25–14	25–23			75–52	Report
23 Jul	15:00	Russia	3–0	Czech Republic	25–16	25–15	25–22			75–53	Report
23 Jul	17:30	Belgium	2–3	Belarus	25–13	16–25	9–25	25–19	12–15	87–97	Report
23 Jul	20:00	Romania	3–1	Turkey	18–25	25–22	25–20	25–22		93–89	Report
25 Jul	15:00	Russia	3–0	Belgium	25–22	25–19	25–13			75–54	Report
25 Jul	17:30	Belarus	3–2	Romania	11–25	25–22	19–25	25–20	15–8	95–100	Report
25 Jul	20:00	Czech Republic	1–3	Turkey	25–23	18–25	21–25	19–25		83–98	Report
26 Jul	15:00	Romania	2–3	Russia	25–22	15–25	8–25	25–14	10–25	83–111	Report
26 Jul	17:30	Belgium	1–3	Czech Republic	14–25	25–20	21–25	22–25		82–95	Report
26 Jul	20:00	Turkey	3–1	Belarus	25–21	21–25	25–22	26–24		97–92	Report

== 5th–8th classification ==
Semifinals
28 July
Netherlands	3
Romania	1
28 July
Greece	0
Turkey	3

5th-place match
29 July
Netherlands	3
Turkey	1
7th-place match
29 July
Romania	3
Greece	0

=== 5th–8th semifinals ===
Date	Time		Score		Set 1	Set 2	Set 3	Set 4	Set 5	Total	Report
28 Jul	12:00	Netherlands	3–1	Romania	25–14	25–12	24–26	25–19		99–71	Report
28 Jul	14:30	Greece	0–3	Turkey	12–25	18–25	16–25			46–75	Report

=== 7th-place match ===
Date	Time		Score		Set 1	Set 2	Set 3	Set 4	Set 5	Total	Report
29 Jul	10:00	Romania	3–0	Greece	25–15	25–17	25–13			75–45	Report

=== 5th-place match ===
Date	Time		Score		Set 1	Set 2	Set 3	Set 4	Set 5	Total	Report
29 Jul	12:30	Netherlands	3–1	Turkey	18–25	29–27	25–20	25–18		97–90	Report

== Final round ==
Semifinals
28 July
Italy	3
Belarus	0
28 July
Russia	3
Bulgaria	2

Final
29 July
Italy	3
Russia	0
3rd-place match
29 July
Belarus	2
Bulgaria	3

=== Semifinals ===
Date	Time		Score		Set 1	Set 2	Set 3	Set 4	Set 5	Total	Report
28 Jul	17:00	Italy	3–0	Belarus	25–13	25–6	25–12			75–31	Report
28 Jul	19:30	Russia	3–2	Bulgaria	17–25	25–21	22–25	25–21	15–11	104–103	Report

=== 3rd-place match ===
Date	Time		Score		Set 1	Set 2	Set 3	Set 4	Set 5	Total	Report
29 Jul	15:30	Belarus	2–3	Bulgaria	25–20	16–25	14–25	25–20	13–15	93–105	Report

=== Final ===
Date	Time		Score		Set 1	Set 2	Set 3	Set 4	Set 5	Total	Report
29 Jul	18:00	Italy	3–0	Russia	25–22	25–22	25–17			75–61	Report

== Final standing ==
Rank	Team
1st place, gold medalist(s)	Italy
2nd place, silver medalist(s)	Russia
3rd place, bronze medalist(s)	Bulgaria
4	Belarus
5	Netherlands
6	Turkey
7	Romania
8	Greece
9	Czech Republic
10	Finland
11	Denmark
12	Belgium

== Awards ==
At the conclusion of the tournament, the following players were selected as the tournament dream team.

- Most valuable player
  (Russia) Tatiana Kadochkina
- Best setter
  (Italy) Sofia Monza
- Best outside spikers
  (Bulgaria) Aleksandra Georgieva
  (Belarus) Kseniya Liabiodkina
- Best middle blockers
  (Italy) Claudia Consoli
  (Russia) Elizaveta Kochurina
- Best opposite spiker
  (Bulgaria) Merilin Nikolova
- Best libero
  (Italy) Francesca Magazza
