= 2023 Women's U17 European Volleyball Championship =

Tournament details
- Host country: Serbia; Hungary
- Dates: 11–23 July 2023
- Teams: 16
- Venues: 2 (in 2 host cities)

Final positions
- Champions: Italy (2nd title)

Tournament awards
- MVP: (Italy) Ludovica Tosini

The 2023 Women's U17 European Volleyball Championship was the 4th edition of the Women's U17 European Volleyball Championship, a biennial international volleyball tournament organised by the European Volleyball Confederation (CEV) the girls' under-17 national teams of Europe. The tournament was held in Serbia and Hungary from 11 to 23 July 2023.

== Qualification ==
Means of qualification		Qualifier
Host countries		Serbia
Host countries		Hungary
Qualification 1st round	BVA	Turkey
Qualification 1st round	EEVZA	Poland
Qualification 1st round	MEVZA	Croatia
Qualification 1st round	WEVZA	Italy
Qualification 2nd round	Pool A	Bulgaria
Qualification 2nd round	Pool A	Germany
Qualification 2nd round	Pool B	Netherlands
Qualification 2nd round	Pool B	France
Qualification 2nd round	Pool C	Slovenia
Qualification 2nd round	Pool C	Greece
Qualification 2nd round	Pool D	Romania
Qualification 2nd round	Pool D	Georgia
Qualification 2nd round	Pool E	Belgium
Qualification 2nd round	Pool E	Estonia

== Venues ==
Pool I, Final round		Pool II	
Vrnjačka Banja, Serbia	2023 Women's U17 European Volleyball Championship is located in Serbia	Békéscsaba, Hungary	2023 Women's U17 European Volleyball Championship is located in Hungary
TBD	2023 Women's U17 European Volleyball Championship is located in Serbia	TBD	2023 Women's U17 European Volleyball Championship is located in Hungary
Capacity: TBD	2023 Women's U17 European Volleyball Championship is located in Serbia	Capacity: TBD	2023 Women's U17 European Volleyball Championship is located in Hungary

== Pools composition ==
The drawing of lots was combined with a seeding of National Federations and performed as follows:

1. The two organisers were seeded in Preliminary pools. Serbia in Pool I and Hungary in Pool II.
2. Remaining 14 participating teams drawn after they were previously placed in five cups as per their position in the latest European Ranking

Pot 1	Pot 2	Pot 3	Pot 4	Pot 5	Pot 6	Pot 7
Italy (1); Turkey (3)	Croatia (5); Belgium (6)	Romania (7); Bulgaria (8)	Slovenia (9); Netherlands (10)	Poland (11); Germany (12)	France (14); Estonia (20)	Georgia (26); Greece (27)

Result

The drawing of lots was held on 28 April 2023.

Pool I	Pool II
Serbia	Hungary
Italy	Turkey
Croatia	Belgium
Bulgaria	Romania
Netherlands	Slovenia
Poland	Germany
Estonia	France
Georgia	Greece

== Preliminary round ==
=== Pool I ===
Pos	Team	Pld	W	L	Pts	SW	SL	SR	SPW	SPL	SPR	Qualification
1	Croatia	7	7	0	19	21	6	3.500	547	453	1.208	Semifinals
2	Italy	7	6	1	17	19	7	2.714	620	487	1.273	Semifinals
3	Poland	7	4	3	12	17	13	1.308	663	641	1.034	
4	Bulgaria	7	3	4	10	12	13	0.923	544	549	0.991	
5	Netherlands	7	3	4	9	14	14	1.000	617	615	1.003	
6	Serbia	7	3	4	9	12	16	0.750	595	630	0.944	
7	Estonia	7	1	6	6	9	19	0.474	536	636	0.843	
8	Georgia	7	1	6	2	4	20	0.200	476	585	0.814	

Date	Time		Score		Set 1	Set 2	Set 3	Set 4	Set 5	Total	Report
11 Jul	12:00	Italy	3–2	Poland	23–25	25–14	25–17	23–25	15–10	111–91	Report
11 Jul	14:30	Netherlands	1–3	Bulgaria	23–25	25–15	23–25	28–30		99–95	Report
11 Jul	17:30	Georgia	3–2	Serbia	25–16	18–25	14–25	25–21	15–9	97–96	Report
11 Jul	20:00	Croatia	3–0	Estonia	25–14	25–13	25–11			75–38	Report
12 Jul	12:00	Georgia	0–3	Bulgaria	17–25	17–25	15–25			49–75	Report
12 Jul	14:30	Italy	1–3	Croatia	23–25	25–21	20–25	18–25		86–96	Report
12 Jul	17:30	Serbia	3–2	Estonia	25–23	23–25	18–25	25–18	15–12	106–103	Report
12 Jul	20:00	Poland	3–2	Netherlands	20–25	26–24	25–10	23–25	15–13	109–97	Report
13 Jul	12:00	Bulgaria	3–0	Estonia	25–13	25–19	25–17			75–49	Report
13 Jul	14:30	Croatia	3–2	Poland	25–23	25–21	22–25	22–25	15–13	109–107	Report
13 Jul	17:30	Netherlands	3–0	Serbia	25–14	28–26	28–26			81–66	Report
13 Jul	20:00	Georgia	0–3	Italy	20–25	15–25	15–25			50–75	Report
15 Jul	12:00	Estonia	2–3	Netherlands	25–22	25–20	15–25	23–25	11–15	99–107	Report
15 Jul	14:30	Italy	3–0	Bulgaria	25–23	25–13	25–21			75–57	Report
15 Jul	17:30	Serbia	0–3	Croatia	20–25	18–25	20–25			58–75	Report
15 Jul	20:00	Poland	3–0	Georgia	29–27	25–15	25–23			79–65	Report
16 Jul	12:00	Croatia	3–2	Bulgaria	25–22	22–25	23–25	25–23	15–10	110–105	Report
16 Jul	14:30	Georgia	0–3	Netherlands	19–25	25–27	19–25			63–77	Report
16 Jul	17:30	Poland	1–3	Serbia	25–18	21–25	21–25	24–26		91–94	Report
16 Jul	20:00	Italy	3–0	Estonia	25–14	25–11	25–17			75–42	Report
18 Jul	12:00	Croatia	3–0	Georgia	32–30	25–14	25–21			82–65	Report
18 Jul	14:30	Estonia	2–3	Poland	30–28	19–25	21–25	25–18	9–15	104–111	Report
18 Jul	17:30	Bulgaria	1–3	Serbia	25–17	19–25	20–25	18–25		82–92	Report
18 Jul	20:00	Netherlands	1–3	Italy	18–25	25–22	10–25	15–25		68–97	Report
19 Jul	12:00	Bulgaria	0–3	Poland	22–25	20–25	19–25			61–75	Report
19 Jul	14:30	Estonia	3–1	Georgia	25–19	29–27	22–25	25–20		101–91	Report
19 Jul	17:30	Serbia	1–3	Italy	28–26	21–25	16–25	18–25		83–101	Report
19 Jul	20:00	Netherlands	1–3	Croatia	23–25	25–11	23–25	17–25		88–86	Report

=== Pool II ===
Pos	Team	Pld	W	L	Pts	SW	SL	SR	SPW	SPL	SPR	Qualification
1	Greece	7	7	0	20	21	4	5.250	605	495	1.222	Semifinals
2	Turkey	7	5	2	15	17	7	2.429	560	456	1.228	Semifinals
3	Slovenia	7	4	3	13	14	12	1.167	586	584	1.003	
4	Belgium	7	3	4	10	13	13	1.000	582	551	1.056	
5	Hungary	7	3	4	9	13	17	0.765	594	666	0.892	
6	France	7	2	5	6	10	17	0.588	578	606	0.954	
7	Germany	7	2	5	6	9	18	0.500	567	603	0.940	
8	Romania	7	2	5	5	9	18	0.500	514	625	0.822	

Date	Time		Score		Set 1	Set 2	Set 3	Set 4	Set 5	Total	Report
11 Jul	12:00	Turkey	1–3	Greece	21–25	25–17	24–26	20–25		90–93	Report
11 Jul	14:30	Belgium	2–3	Germany	19–25	25–18	25–18	19–25	14–16	102–102	Report
11 Jul	17:30	France	2–3	Hungary	25–22	22–25	25–18	19–25	12–15	103–105	Report
11 Jul	20:00	Romania	1–3	Slovenia	25–20	7–25	17–25	20–25		69–95	Report
12 Jul	12:00	France	3–0	Germany	25–14	25–18	25–18			75–50	Report
12 Jul	14:30	Turkey	3–0	Romania	25–14	25–6	25–14			75–34	Report
12 Jul	17:30	Hungary	0–3	Slovenia	23–25	31–33	16–25			70–83	Report
12 Jul	20:00	Greece	3–0	Belgium	25–20	25–20	25–13			75–53	Report
13 Jul	12:00	Germany	1–3	Slovenia	20–25	26–24	19–25	23–25		88–99	Report
13 Jul	14:30	Romania	1–3	Greece	14–25	22–25	25–19	21–25		82–94	Report
13 Jul	17:30	Belgium	1–3	Hungary	25–22	22–25	21–25	18–25		86–97	Report
13 Jul	20:00	France	1–3	Turkey	15–25	25–21	19–25	21–25		80–96	Report
15 Jul	12:00	Slovenia	3–1	Belgium	28–26	22–25	25–23	25–20		100–94	Report
15 Jul	14:30	Turkey	3–0	Germany	25–23	25–20	25–21			75–64	Report
15 Jul	17:30	Hungary	2–3	Romania	13–25	15–25	25–19	25–18	10–15	88–102	Report
15 Jul	20:00	Greece	3–0	France	25–19	25–17	28–26			78–62	Report
16 Jul	12:00	Romania	1–3	Germany	29–27	17–25	12–25	21–25		79–102	Report
16 Jul	14:30	France	0–3	Belgium	18–25	14–25	18–25			50–75	Report
16 Jul	17:30	Greece	3–2	Hungary	25–17	25–27	24–26	25–16	15–7	114–93	Report
16 Jul	20:00	Turkey	3–0	Slovenia	25–18	25–12	25–15			75–45	Report
18 Jul	12:00	Romania	3–1	France	25–23	18–25	25–23	27–25		95–96	Report
18 Jul	14:30	Slovenia	0–3	Greece	15–25	24–26	18–25			57–76	Report
18 Jul	17:30	Germany	2–3	Hungary	22–25	19–25	25–14	25–19	12–15	103–98	Report
18 Jul	20:00	Belgium	3–1	Turkey	25–19	22–25	25–8	25–22		97–74	Report
19 Jul	12:00	Germany	0–3	Greece	18–25	20–25	20–25			58–75	Report
19 Jul	14:30	Slovenia	2–3	France	24–26	28–26	19–25	25–20	11–15	107–112	Report
19 Jul	17:30	Hungary	0–3	Turkey	11–25	14–25	18–25			43–75	Report
19 Jul	20:00	Belgium	3–0	Romania	25–22	25–14	25–17			75–53	Report

== Final round ==
Semifinals
22 July
Croatia	1
Turkey	3
22 July
Greece	2
Italy	3

Final
23 July
Turkey	1
Italy	3
3rd-place match
23 July
Croatia	3
Greece	1

=== Semifinals ===
Date	Time		Score		Set 1	Set 2	Set 3	Set 4	Set 5	Total	Report
22 Jul	15:30	Croatia	1–3	Turkey	24–26	15–25	25–19	23–25		87–95	Report
22 Jul	18:00	Greece	2–3	Italy	21–25	13–25	25–15	27–25	14–16	100–106	Report

=== 3rd-place match ===
Date	Time		Score		Set 1	Set 2	Set 3	Set 4	Set 5	Total	Report
23 Jul	15:30	Croatia	3–1	Greece	25–21	22–25	25–21	25–10		97–77	Report

=== Final ===
Date	Time		Score		Set 1	Set 2	Set 3	Set 4	Set 5	Total	Report
23 Jul	18:00	Turkey	1–3	Italy	12–25	8–25	25–21	19–25		64–96	Report

== Final standing ==
Rank	Team
1st place, gold medalist(s)	Italy
2nd place, silver medalist(s)	Turkey
3rd place, bronze medalist(s)	Croatia
4	Greece
5	Slovenia
6	Poland
7	Belgium
8	Bulgaria
9	Netherlands
10	Hungary
11	Serbia
12	France
13	Germany
14	Estonia
15	Romania
16	Georgia

Qualified for the 2024 Girls' U17 World Championship

2023 Women's U17 European champions

Italy
Second title

== Awards ==
At the conclusion of the tournament, the following players were selected as the tournament dream team.

- Most valuable player
  (Italy) Ludovica Tosini
- Best setter
  (Italy) Asia Spaziano
- Best outside spikers
  (Croatia) Maša Mlinar
  (Greece) Elpida Tikmanidou
- Best middle blockers
  (Italy) Arianna Bovolenta
  (Turkey) Begüm Kaçmaz
- Best opposite spiker
  (Italy) Stella Caruso
- Best libero
  (Turkey) Ecem Esepaşa
