= 2021 Girls' U16 European Volleyball Championship =

Tournament details
- Host country: Hungary; Slovakia
- Dates: 10–18 July 2021
- Teams: 12
- Venues: 2 (in 2 host cities)

Final positions
- Champions: Russia (1st title)

Tournament awards
- MVP: (Russia) Marina Asliamova

The 2021 Girls' U16 European Volleyball Championship was the 3rd edition of the Girls' U16 European Volleyball Championship, a biennial international volleyball tournament organised by the European Volleyball Confederation (CEV) the girls' under-16 national teams of Europe. The tournament was held in Hungary and Slovakia from 10 to 18 July 2021.

== Qualification ==
Means of qualification		Qualifier
Host countries		Hungary
Host countries		Slovakia
Qualification 1st round	BVA	Serbia
Qualification 1st round	EEVZA	Russia
Qualification 1st round	MEVZA	Czech Republic
Qualification 1st round	WEVZA	Italy
Qualification 2nd round	Pool A	Belgium
Qualification 2nd round	Pool B	Bulgaria
Qualification 2nd round	Pool C	Croatia
Qualification 2nd round	Pool D	Poland
Qualification 2nd round	Pool E	Turkey
Qualification 2nd round	Best runners-up	Romania

== Venues ==
Pool I, final round		Pool II, classification matches	
Nyíregyháza, Hungary	Nyíregyháza is located in Hungary	Humenné, Slovakia	Humenné is located in Slovakia
Continental Arena	Nyíregyháza is located in Hungary	MSH Humenne	Humenné is located in Slovakia
Capacity: 2400	Nyíregyháza is located in Hungary	Capacity: 1186	Humenné is located in Slovakia

== Pools composition ==
The drawing of lots was combined with a seeding of National Federations and performed as follows:

1. The two organisers were seeded in Preliminary pools. Hungary in Pool I and Slovakia in Pool II.
2. Remaining 10 participating teams drawn after they were previously placed in five cups as per their position in the latest European Ranking

Pot 1	Pot 2	Pot 3	Pot 4	Pot 5
Italy (1); Russia (2)	Turkey (3); Romania (5)	Belgium (7); Bulgaria (8)	Serbia (10); Czech Republic (12)	Croatia (13); Poland (15)

Result

The drawing of lots was held on 11 May 2021 in Luxembourg.

Pool I	Pool II
Hungary	Slovakia
Russia	Italy
Turkey	Romania
Belgium	Bulgaria
Czech Republic	Serbia
Poland	Croatia

== Preliminary round ==
=== Pool I ===
Pos	Team	Pld	W	L	Pts	SW	SL	SR	SPW	SPL	SPR	Qualification
1	Russia	5	5	0	14	15	2	7.500	405	294	1.378	Semifinals
2	Turkey	5	4	1	13	14	4	3.500	425	352	1.207	Semifinals
3	Poland	5	3	2	8	10	8	1.250	395	367	1.076	5th–8th semifinals
4	Hungary	5	2	3	6	6	11	0.545	335	385	0.870	5th–8th semifinals
5	Belgium	5	1	4	3	4	13	0.308	323	413	0.782	
6	Czech Republic	5	0	5	1	4	15	0.267	368	440	0.836	

Date	Time		Score		Set 1	Set 2	Set 3	Set 4	Set 5	Total	Report
10 Jul	15:00	Poland	1–3	Turkey	22–25	26–28	25–18	18–25		91–96	Report
10 Jul	17:30	Hungary	3–1	Czech Republic	25–23	19–25	25–19	25–17		94–84	Report
10 Jul	20:00	Belgium	0–3	Russia	16–25	21–25	16–25			53–75	Report
11 Jul	15:00	Czech Republic	0–3	Turkey	17–25	14–25	15–25			46–75	Report
11 Jul	17:30	Hungary	3–1	Belgium	25–14	25–17	23–25	25–20		98–76	Report
11 Jul	20:00	Russia	3–0	Poland	25–14	25–20	25–13			75–47	Report
12 Jul	15:00	Belgium	3–1	Czech Republic	25–19	14–25	25–22	25–23		89–89	Report
12 Jul	17:30	Poland	3–0	Hungary	25–18	25–14	25–14			75–46	Report
12 Jul	20:00	Turkey	2–3	Russia	23–25	25–18	25–22	17–25	13–15	103–105	Report
14 Jul	15:00	Belgium	0–3	Poland	18–25	18–25	15–25			51–75	Report
14 Jul	17:30	Hungary	0–3	Turkey	17–25	21–25	18–25			56–75	Report
14 Jul	20:00	Czech Republic	0–3	Russia	22–25	16–25	12–25			50–75	Report
15 Jul	15:00	Turkey	3–0	Belgium	25–14	26–24	25–16			76–54	Report
15 Jul	17:30	Russia	3–0	Hungary	25–12	25–17	25–12			75–41	Report
15 Jul	20:00	Poland	3–2	Czech Republic	25–23	19–25	23–25	25–13	15–13	107–99	Report

=== Pool II ===
Pos	Team	Pld	W	L	Pts	SW	SL	SR	SPW	SPL	SPR	Qualification
1	Italy	5	4	1	12	12	4	3.000	383	277	1.383	Semifinals
2	Bulgaria	5	4	1	11	13	6	2.167	444	379	1.172	Semifinals
3	Serbia	5	4	1	11	12	6	2.000	403	336	1.199	5th–8th semifinals
4	Slovakia	5	2	3	6	8	10	0.800	344	412	0.835	5th–8th semifinals
5	Croatia	5	1	4	5	8	13	0.615	428	478	0.895	
6	Romania	5	0	5	0	1	15	0.067	282	402	0.701	

Date	Time		Score		Set 1	Set 2	Set 3	Set 4	Set 5	Total	Report
10 Jul	15:00	Italy	0–3	Bulgaria	21–25	17–25	22–25			60–75	Report
10 Jul	17:30	Slovakia	3–0	Romania	25–13	25–17	25–22			75–52	Report
10 Jul	20:00	Serbia	3–2	Croatia	23–25	25–10	22–25	25–19	15–11	110–90	Report
11 Jul	15:00	Bulgaria	3–0	Romania	25–16	25–17	25–19			75–52	Report
11 Jul	17:30	Croatia	1–3	Slovakia	23–25	21–25	25–16	23–25		92–91	Report
11 Jul	20:00	Italy	3–0	Serbia	25–17	25–18	25–13			75–48	Report
12 Jul	15:00	Romania	1–3	Croatia	25–19	19–25	18–25	29–31		91–100	Report
12 Jul	17:30	Slovakia	1–3	Italy	25–21	9–25	13–25	18–25		65–96	Report
12 Jul	20:00	Serbia	3–1	Bulgaria	25–21	25–19	20–25	25–21		95–86	Report
14 Jul	15:00	Italy	3–0	Romania	25–13	27–25	25–8			77–46	Report
14 Jul	17:30	Serbia	3–0	Slovakia	25–12	25–17	25–15			75–44	Report
14 Jul	20:00	Bulgaria	3–2	Croatia	20–25	25–18	25–22	26–28	15–10	111–103	Report
15 Jul	15:00	Romania	0–3	Serbia	12–25	9–25	20–25			41–75	Report
15 Jul	17:30	Croatia	0–3	Italy	12–25	9–25	22–25			43–75	Report
15 Jul	20:00	Slovakia	1–3	Bulgaria	15–25	25–22	8–25	21–25		69–97	Report

== 5th–8th classification ==
Semifinals
17 July
Poland	3
Slovakia	0
17 July
Serbia	3
Hungary	1

5th-place match
18 July
Poland	2
Serbia	3
7th-place match
18 July
Slovakia	0
Hungary	3

=== 5th–8th semifinals ===
Date	Time		Score		Set 1	Set 2	Set 3	Set 4	Set 5	Total	Report
17 Jul	15:30	Poland	3–0	Slovakia	25–15	25–16	25–18			75–49	Report
17 Jul	18:00	Serbia	3–1	Hungary	19–25	26–24	25–18	25–22		95–89	Report

=== 7th-place match ===
Date	Time		Score		Set 1	Set 2	Set 3	Set 4	Set 5	Total	Report
18 Jul	15:30	Slovakia	0–3	Hungary	20–25	20–25	18–25			58–75	Report

=== 5th-place match ===
Date	Time		Score		Set 1	Set 2	Set 3	Set 4	Set 5	Total	Report
18 Jul	18:00	Poland	2–3	Serbia	25–20	24–26	25–12	23–25	9–15	106–98	Report

== Final round ==
Semifinals
17 July
Russia	3
Bulgaria	0
17 July
Italy	3
Turkey	2

Final
18 July
Russia	3
Italy	1
3rd-place match
18 July
Bulgaria	3
Turkey	2

=== Semifinals ===
Date	Time		Score		Set 1	Set 2	Set 3	Set 4	Set 5	Total	Report
17 Jul	15:30	Russia	3–0	Bulgaria	25–16	25–13	25–16			75–45	Report
17 Jul	18:00	Italy	3–2	Turkey	25–21	20–25	19–25	25–19	15–6	104–96	Report

=== 3rd-place match ===
Date	Time		Score		Set 1	Set 2	Set 3	Set 4	Set 5	Total	Report
18 Jul	15:30	Bulgaria	3–2	Turkey	21–25	20–25	25–10	25–20	15–6	106–86	Report

=== Final ===
Date	Time		Score		Set 1	Set 2	Set 3	Set 4	Set 5	Total	Report
18 Jul	18:00	Russia	3–1	Italy	25–21	22–25	25–21	25–16		97–83	Report

== Final standing ==
Rank	Team
1st place, gold medalist(s)	Russia
2nd place, silver medalist(s)	Italy
3rd place, bronze medalist(s)	Bulgaria
4	Turkey
5	Serbia
6	Poland
7	Hungary
8	Slovakia
9	Croatia
10	Belgium
11	Czech Republic
12	Romania

== Awards ==
At the conclusion of the tournament, the following players were selected as the tournament dream team.

- Most valuable player
  (Russia) Marina Asliamova
- Best setter
  (Russia) Polina Sarapova
- Best outside spikers
  (Italy) Erika Esposito
  (Russia) Polina Kovaleva
- Best middle blockers
  (Italy) Linda Manfredini
  (Italy) Maia Carlotta Monaco
- Best opposite spiker
  (Bulgaria) Iva Dudova
- Best libero
  (Russia) Olesia Ananina
