= 2019 Girls' U16 European Volleyball Championship =

Tournament details
- Host country: Italy; Croatia
- Dates: 13–21 July 2019
- Teams: 12
- Venues: 2 (in 2 host cities)

Final positions
- Champions: Turkey (1st title)

Tournament awards
- MVP: (Turkey) Özge Arslanalp

The 2019 Girls' U16 European Volleyball Championship was the 2nd edition of the Girls' U16 European Volleyball Championship, a biennial international volleyball tournament organised by the European Volleyball Confederation (CEV) the girls' under-16 national teams of Europe. The tournament was held in Italy and Croatia from 13 to 21 July 2019.

== Qualification ==
| Means of qualification | | Qualifier |
|---|---|---|
| Host Countries | | Italy |
| Host Countries | | Croatia |
| Qualification 1st round | BVA | Turkey |
| Qualification 1st round | EEVZA | Russia |
| Qualification 1st round | MEVZA | Slovenia |
| Qualification 1st round | NEVZA | Finland |
| Qualification 1st round | WEVZA | Belgium |
| Qualification 2nd round | Pool A | Serbia |
| Qualification 2nd round | Pool B | Germany |
| Qualification 2nd round | Pool C | Romania |
| Qualification 2nd round | Pool D | France |
| Qualification 2nd round | Pool E | Netherlands |

== Venues ==
| Pool I, Classification matches | | Pool II, Final round | |
|---|---|---|---|
| Zagreb, Croatia | Zagreb is located in Croatia | Trieste, Italy | Trieste is located in Italy |
| ŠSD Trnsko | Zagreb is located in Croatia | PalaChiarbola | Trieste is located in Italy |
| Capacity: 2,500 | Zagreb is located in Croatia | Capacity: 1,086 | Trieste is located in Italy |

== Preliminary round ==
=== Pool I ===
| Pos | Team | Pld | W | L | Pts | SW | SL | SR | SPW | SPL | SPR | Qualification |
|---|---|---|---|---|---|---|---|---|---|---|---|---|
| 1 | Russia | 5 | 5 | 0 | 15 | 15 | 1 | 15.000 | 396 | 246 | 1.610 | Semifinals |
| 2 | Slovenia | 5 | 3 | 2 | 9 | 12 | 9 | 1.333 | 460 | 431 | 1.067 | Semifinals |
| 3 | Germany | 5 | 3 | 2 | 8 | 10 | 8 | 1.250 | 359 | 390 | 0.921 | 5th–8th semifinals |
| 4 | France | 5 | 3 | 2 | 8 | 10 | 9 | 1.111 | 414 | 396 | 1.045 | 5th–8th semifinals |
| 5 | Croatia | 5 | 1 | 4 | 5 | 7 | 13 | 0.538 | 404 | 462 | 0.874 | |
| 6 | Finland | 5 | 0 | 5 | 0 | 1 | 15 | 0.067 | 291 | 399 | 0.729 | |

| Date | Time | | Score | | Set 1 | Set 2 | Set 3 | Set 4 | Set 5 | Total | Report |
|---|---|---|---|---|---|---|---|---|---|---|---|
| 13 Jul | 15:00 | Slovenia | 1–3 | Russia | 25–21 | 14–25 | 14–25 | 19–25 | | 72–96 | Report |
| 13 Jul | 17:30 | Croatia | 2–3 | France | 7–25 | 25–22 | 25–20 | 23–25 | 12–15 | 92–107 | Report |
| 13 Jul | 20:00 | Germany | 3–0 | Finland | 25–18 | 25–18 | 25–18 | | | 75–54 | Report |
| 14 Jul | 15:00 | Russia | 3–0 | France | 25–14 | 25–21 | 25–15 | | | 75–50 | Report |
| 14 Jul | 17:30 | Finland | 1–3 | Croatia | 22–25 | 22–25 | 26–24 | 17–25 | | 87–99 | Report |
| 14 Jul | 20:00 | Slovenia | 2–3 | Germany | 25–16 | 19–25 | 20–25 | 25–12 | 14–16 | 103–94 | Report |
| 15 Jul | 15:00 | France | 3–0 | Finland | 25–17 | 25–16 | 25–19 | | | 75–52 | Report |
| 15 Jul | 17:30 | Croatia | 2–3 | Slovenia | 26–24 | 26–24 | 18–25 | 26–28 | 8–15 | 104–116 | Report |
| 15 Jul | 20:00 | Germany | 0–3 | Russia | 8–25 | 11–25 | 11–25 | | | 30–75 | Report |
| 17 Jul | 15:00 | Slovenia | 3–1 | France | 25–21 | 19–25 | 25–20 | 25–20 | | 94–86 | Report |
| 17 Jul | 17:30 | Germany | 3–0 | Croatia | 25–22 | 25–15 | 27–25 | | | 77–62 | Report |
| 17 Jul | 20:00 | Russia | 3–0 | Finland | 25–19 | 25–14 | 25–14 | | | 75–47 | Report |
| 18 Jul | 15:00 | France | 3–1 | Germany | 21–25 | 25–22 | 25–17 | 25–19 | | 96–83 | Report |
| 18 Jul | 17:30 | Croatia | 0–3 | Russia | 17–25 | 14–25 | 16–25 | | | 47–75 | Report |
| 18 Jul | 20:00 | Finland | 0–3 | Slovenia | 18–25 | 14–25 | 19–25 | | | 51–75 | Report |

=== Pool II ===
| Pos | Team | Pld | W | L | Pts | SW | SL | SR | SPW | SPL | SPR | Qualification |
|---|---|---|---|---|---|---|---|---|---|---|---|---|
| 1 | Turkey | 5 | 5 | 0 | 15 | 15 | 0 | MAX | 375 | 251 | 1.494 | Semifinals |
| 2 | Italy | 5 | 4 | 1 | 12 | 12 | 4 | 3.000 | 375 | 314 | 1.194 | Semifinals |
| 3 | Serbia | 5 | 3 | 2 | 8 | 9 | 8 | 1.125 | 361 | 352 | 1.026 | 5th–8th semifinals |
| 4 | Netherlands | 5 | 1 | 4 | 5 | 8 | 13 | 0.615 | 425 | 462 | 0.920 | 5th–8th semifinals |
| 5 | Romania | 5 | 1 | 4 | 3 | 5 | 14 | 0.357 | 338 | 431 | 0.784 | |
| 6 | Belgium | 5 | 1 | 4 | 2 | 4 | 14 | 0.286 | 348 | 412 | 0.845 | |

| Date | Time | | Score | | Set 1 | Set 2 | Set 3 | Set 4 | Set 5 | Total | Report |
|---|---|---|---|---|---|---|---|---|---|---|---|
| 13 Jul | 11:00 | Turkey | 3–0 | Serbia | 25–14 | 25–18 | 25–16 | | | 75–48 | Report |
| 13 Jul | 17:00 | Netherlands | 3–1 | Belgium | 25–23 | 17–25 | 25–22 | 25–19 | | 92–89 | Report |
| 13 Jul | 19:30 | Romania | 0–3 | Italy | 23–25 | 10–25 | 10–25 | | | 43–75 | Report |
| 14 Jul | 11:00 | Serbia | 3–0 | Belgium | 25–11 | 25–17 | 25–20 | | | 75–48 | Report |
| 14 Jul | 17:00 | Turkey | 3–0 | Romania | 25–12 | 25–18 | 25–13 | | | 75–43 | Report |
| 14 Jul | 19:30 | Italy | 3–1 | Netherlands | 22–25 | 25–23 | 25–23 | 25–11 | | 97–82 | Report |
| 15 Jul | 11:00 | Romania | 0–3 | Serbia | 23–25 | 22–25 | 16–25 | | | 61–75 | Report |
| 15 Jul | 17:00 | Netherlands | 0–3 | Turkey | 21–25 | 19–25 | 22–25 | | | 62–75 | Report |
| 15 Jul | 19:30 | Belgium | 0–3 | Italy | 20–25 | 18–25 | 18–25 | | | 56–75 | Report |
| 17 Jul | 11:00 | Romania | 3–2 | Netherlands | 20–25 | 25–12 | 11–25 | 25–22 | 15–12 | 96–96 | Report |
| 17 Jul | 17:00 | Turkey | 3–0 | Belgium | 25–18 | 25–10 | 25–17 | | | 75–45 | Report |
| 17 Jul | 19:30 | Serbia | 0–3 | Italy | 15–25 | 21–25 | 22–25 | | | 58–75 | Report |
| 18 Jul | 11:00 | Belgium | 3–2 | Romania | 23–25 | 22–25 | 25–16 | 25–16 | 15–13 | 110–95 | Report |
| 18 Jul | 17:00 | Netherlands | 2–3 | Serbia | 25–18 | 20–25 | 25–22 | 12–25 | 11–15 | 93–105 | Report |
| 18 Jul | 19:30 | Italy | 0–3 | Turkey | 15–25 | 16–25 | 22–25 | | | 53–75 | Report |

== 5th–8th classification ==
Semifinals
20 July
Germany | 2
Netherlands | 3
20 July
Serbia | 3
France | 1

5th-place match
21 July
Netherlands | 3
Serbia | 1
7th-place match
21 July
Germany | 3
France | 0

=== 5th–8th semifinals ===
| Date | Time | | Score | | Set 1 | Set 2 | Set 3 | Set 4 | Set 5 | Total | Report |
|---|---|---|---|---|---|---|---|---|---|---|---|
| 20 Jul | 17:30 | Serbia | 3–1 | France | 25–20 | 25–12 | 15–25 | 25–18 | | 90–75 | Report |
| 20 Jul | 20:00 | Germany | 2–3 | Netherlands | 20–25 | 25–21 | 25–19 | 24–26 | 8–15 | 102–106 | Report |

=== 7th-place match ===
| Date | Time | | Score | | Set 1 | Set 2 | Set 3 | Set 4 | Set 5 | Total | Report |
|---|---|---|---|---|---|---|---|---|---|---|---|
| 21 Jul | 10:00 | Germany | 3–0 | France | 25–16 | 25–22 | 25–19 | | | 75–57 | Report |

=== 5th-place match ===
| Date | Time | | Score | | Set 1 | Set 2 | Set 3 | Set 4 | Set 5 | Total | Report |
|---|---|---|---|---|---|---|---|---|---|---|---|
| 21 Jul | 12:30 | Netherlands | 3–1 | Serbia | 29–27 | 18–25 | 25–22 | 25–20 | | 97–94 | Report |

== Final round ==
Semifinals
20 July
Russia | 2
Italy | 3
20 July
Turkey | 3
Slovenia | 1

Final
21 July
Italy | 0
Turkey | 3
3rd-place match
21 July
Russia | 3
Slovenia | 1

=== Semifinals ===
| Date | Time | | Score | | Set 1 | Set 2 | Set 3 | Set 4 | Set 5 | Total | Report |
|---|---|---|---|---|---|---|---|---|---|---|---|
| 20 Jul | 17:00 | Turkey | 3–1 | Slovenia | 23–25 | 25–18 | 25–17 | 25–8 | | 98–68 | Report |
| 20 Jul | 19:30 | Russia | 2–3 | Italy | 25–21 | 16–25 | 25–13 | 24–26 | 11–15 | 101–100 | Report |

=== 3rd-place match ===
| Date | Time | | Score | | Set 1 | Set 2 | Set 3 | Set 4 | Set 5 | Total | Report |
|---|---|---|---|---|---|---|---|---|---|---|---|
| 21 Jul | 17:00 | Russia | 3–1 | Slovenia | 25–19 | 18–25 | 25–18 | 25–14 | | 93–76 | Report |

=== Final ===
| Date | Time | | Score | | Set 1 | Set 2 | Set 3 | Set 4 | Set 5 | Total | Report |
|---|---|---|---|---|---|---|---|---|---|---|---|
| 21 Jul | 20:00 | Italy | 0–3 | Turkey | 20–25 | 20–25 | 20–25 | | | 60–75 | Report |

== Final standing ==
| Rank | Team |
|---|---|
| 1st place, gold medalist(s) | Turkey |
| 2nd place, silver medalist(s) | Italy |
| 3rd place, bronze medalist(s) | Russia |
| 4 | Slovenia |
| 5 | Netherlands |
| 6 | Serbia |
| 7 | Germany |
| 8 | France |
| 9 | Croatia |
| 10 | Romania |
| 11 | Belgium |
| 12 | Finland |

== Awards ==
At the conclusion of the tournament, the following players were selected as the tournament dream team.

- Most valuable player
  (Turkey) Özge Arslanalp
- Best setter
  (Turkey) Özge Arslanalp
- Best outside spikers
  (Russia) Arina Fedorovtseva
  (Slovenia) Naja Šalamun
- Fair play
  (Italy) Greta Catania
- Best middle blockers
  (Russia) Natalia Suvorova
  (Slovenia) Neja Čižman
- Best opposite spiker
  (Slovenia) Taja Gradišnik Klanjšček
- Best libero
  (Italy) Benedetta Salviato
