= CEV Women's U16 Volleyball European Championship =

International youth volleyball tournament

- Current season, competition or edition: 2025 Women's U16 European Volleyball Championship
- Sport: Volleyball
- Founded: 2017; 9 years ago
- First season: 2017
- No. of teams: 16
- Continent: Europe (CEV)
- Most recent champion: Poland (1st title)
- Most titles: Italy (2 titles)
- Website: cev.eu

The Women's U16 Volleyball European Championship is a sport competition for volleyball national teams with players under 16 years, currently held biannually and organized by the European Volleyball Confederation, the volleyball federation from Europe. Only for 2023 edition the age limit was 17 years, and returned to 16 for 2025 edition.

== Results summary ==
Year	Host	Final			Third place match			Teams
Year	Host	Champions	Score	Runners-up	3rd place	Score	4th place	Teams
2017; Details	Bulgaria	Italy	3–0	Russia	Bulgaria	3–2	Belarus	12
2019; Details	Italy / Croatia	Turkey	3–0	Italy	Russia	3–1	Slovenia	12
2021; Details	Hungary / Slovakia	Russia	3–1	Italy	Bulgaria	3–2	Turkey	12
2023; Details	Serbia / Hungary	Italy	3–1	Turkey	Croatia	3–1	Greece	16
2025; Details	Albania / Kosovo	Poland	3–1	Turkey	Italy	3–0	Czech Republic	16

== Medal table ==
Rank	Nation	Gold	Silver	Bronze	Total
1	Italy	2	2	1	5
2	Turkey	1	2	0	3
3	Russia	1	1	1	3
4	Poland	1	0	0	1
5	Bulgaria	0	0	2	2
6	Croatia	0	0	1	1
Totals (6 entries)		5	5	5	15

== Participating nations ==
Nation	(Bulgaria) 2017	(Italy) (Croatia) 2019	(Hungary) (Slovakia) 2021	(Serbia) (Hungary) 2023	(Albania) (Kosovo) 2025	Years
Albania					15th	1
Belarus	4th					1
Belgium	12th	11th	10th	7th		4
Bulgaria	3rd		3rd	8th	10th	4
Croatia		9th	9th	3rd	5th	4
Czech Republic	9th		11th		4th	3
Denmark	11th					1
Estonia				14th		1
Finland	10th	12th				2
France		8th		12th	7th	3
Georgia				16th		1
Germany		7th		13th		2
Greece	8th			4th	8th	3
Hungary			7th	10th	11th	3
Italy	1st	2nd	2nd	1st	3rd	5
Kosovo					16th	1
Lithuania					14th	1
Montenegro					9th	1
Netherlands	5th	5th		9th		3
Poland			6th	6th	1st	3
Romania	7th	10th	12th	15th		4
Russia	2nd	3rd	1st			3
Serbia		6th	5th	11th		3
Slovakia			8th			1
Slovenia		4th		5th	13th	3
Spain					6th	1
Turkey	6th	1st	4th	2nd	2nd	5
Ukraine					12th	1
