= Indonesia women's national under-21 volleyball team =

Indonesia women's U-21
- Association: Indonesian Volleyball Federation (PBVSI)
- Confederation: AVC
- Head coach: Marcos Sugiyama

Uniforms
Home	Away

FIVB U21 World Championship
- Appearances: 1 (First in 2025)
- Best result: 16th (2025)

Asian U20 Championship
- Appearances: 8 (First in 1988)
- Best result: 4th (1988)

The Indonesia women's national under-21 volleyball team (Indonesian: Tim nasional bola voli U-21 putri Indonesia) represents Indonesia in women's under-21 and 20 level in international volleyball competitions. It is controlled and managed by the Indonesian Volleyball Federation (PBVSI) that is a member Asian Volleyball Confederation (AVC) and the Fédération Internationale de Volleyball (FIVB).

== Competition history ==
=== FIVB U21 World Championship ===
Champions Runners-up 3rd place 4th place

FIVB U21 World Championship
Year	Round	Position	Pld	W	L	SW	SL	Squad
(Brazil) 1977	Did not enter or Did not qualify							
(Mexico) 1981	Did not enter or Did not qualify							
(Italy) 1985	Did not enter or Did not qualify							
(South Korea) 1987	Did not enter or Did not qualify							
(Peru) 1989	Did not enter or Did not qualify							
(Czechoslovakia) 1991	Did not enter or Did not qualify							
(Brazil) 1993	Did not enter or Did not qualify							
(Thailand) 1995	Did not enter or Did not qualify							
(Poland) 1997	Did not enter or Did not qualify							
(Canada) 1999	Did not enter or Did not qualify							
(Dominican Republic) 2001	Did not enter or Did not qualify							
(Thailand) 2003	Did not enter or Did not qualify							
(Turkey) 2005	Did not enter or Did not qualify							
(Thailand) 2007	Did not enter or Did not qualify							
(Mexico) 2009	Did not enter or Did not qualify							
(Peru) 2011	Did not enter or Did not qualify							
(Czech Republic) 2013	Did not enter or Did not qualify							
(Puerto Rico) 2015	Did not enter or Did not qualify							
(Mexico) 2017	Did not enter or Did not qualify							
(Mexico) 2019	Did not enter or Did not qualify							
(Belgium) (Netherlands) 2021	Did not enter or Did not qualify							
(Mexico) 2023	Did not enter or Did not qualify							
(Indonesia) 2025	Round of 16	16th place	9	2	7	15	22	Squad
Total	0 Titles	1/23	9	2	7	15	22	—

=== Asian U20 Championship ===
Champions Runners-up 3rd place 4th place

Asian U20 Championship
Year	Round	Position	Pld	W	L	SW	SL	Squad
(South Korea) 1980	Did not participate							
(Australia) 1984	Did not participate							
(Thailand) 1986	Did not participate							
(Indonesia) 1988	Semifinals	4th Place						
(Thailand) 1990	Classification Round	8th place						
(Malaysia) 1992	Classification Round	9th place						
(Philippines) 1994	Round Robin	9th place						
(Thailand) 1996	Did not participate							
(Thailand) 1998	Did not participate							
(Philippines) 2000	Did not participate							
(Vietnam) 2002	Classification Round	9th place						
(Sri Lanka) 2004	Did not participate							
(Thailand) 2006	Classification Round	9th place						
(Taiwan) 2008	Classification Round	6th place						
(Vietnam) 2010	Classification Round	7th place						
(Thailand) 2012	Did not participate							
(Taiwan) 2014	Did not participate							
(Thailand) 2016	Did not participate							
(Vietnam) 2018	Did not participate							
(China) 2020	Cancelled due to COVID-19 pandemic							
(Kazakhstan) 2022	Did not participate							
(China) 2024	Did not participate							
Total	0 Titles							—

== Team ==
=== Current squad ===
The following list consists of 12 players who are called for 2025 U21 World Championship.

Head coach: (Japan) Marcos Sugiyama

No.	Pos	Name	Date of Birth	Height	Weight	Spike	Block
2	MB	Maradanti Namira Tegariani	1 May 2006 (age 20)	1.80 m (5 ft 11 in)	58 kg (128 lb)	290 cm (110 in)	285 cm (112 in)
5	OH	Syelomitha Avrilaviza Wongkar	4 November 2008 (age 17)	1.80 m (5 ft 11 in)	61 kg (134 lb)	285 cm (9 ft 4 in)	276 cm (9 ft 1 in)
7	OH	Kadek Diva Yanti Putri Ardiantana	2 November 2005 (age 20)	1.74 m (5 ft 9 in)	58 kg (128 lb)	–	–
12	OP	Junaida Santi	9 May 2007 (age 19)	1.77 m (5 ft 10 in)	68 kg (150 lb)	298 cm (117 in)	288 cm (113 in)
16	S	Ajeng Nur Cahaya	11 June 2006 (age 20)	1.67 m (5 ft 6 in)	58 kg (128 lb)	295 cm (116 in)	288 cm (113 in)
18	S	Afra Hasna Nurhaliza (captain)	14 July 2005 (age 20)	1.72 m (5 ft 8 in)	59 kg (130 lb)	300 cm (120 in)	293 cm (115 in)
19	OH	Pascalina Mahuze	29 March 2005 (age 21)	1.74 m (5 ft 9 in)	66 kg (146 lb)	286 cm (113 in)	280 cm (110 in)
20	MB	Geofanny Eka Cahyaningtyas	7 May 2005 (age 21)	1.75 m (5 ft 9 in)	66 kg (146 lb)	283 cm (111 in)	275 cm (108 in)
22	L	Indah Guretno Dwi Margiani	5 March 2005 (age 21)	1.68 m (5 ft 6 in)	50 kg (110 lb)	285 cm (112 in)	280 cm (110 in)
24	MB	Chelsa Berliana Nurtomo	24 June 2007 (age 19)	1.87 m (6 ft 2 in)	69 kg (152 lb)	294 cm (116 in)	288 cm (113 in)
25	OH	Azzahra Dwi Febyane	1 February 2007 (age 19)	1.80 m (5 ft 11 in)	65 kg (143 lb)	286 cm (113 in)	282 cm (111 in)
55	L	Zahwa Aliah Jasmien	30 September 2006 (age 19)	1.68 m (5 ft 6 in)	50 kg (110 lb)	295 cm (116 in)	288 cm (113 in)
