= 2025 FIVB Volleyball Women's U21 World Championship =

Volleyball tournament in Surabaya, Indonesia

Kejuaraan Dunia Bola Voli Putri U21 FIVB 2025

Tournament details
- Host country: Indonesia
- City: Surabaya
- Dates: 7–17 August
- Teams: 24 (from 5 confederations)
- Venue: 3 (in 1 host city)

Final positions
- Champions: Italy (3rd title)
- Runners-up: Japan
- Third place: Brazil
- Fourth place: Bulgaria

Tournament awards
- MVP: (Italy) Merit Adigwe
- Best Setter: (Japan) Chisato Hanaoka
- Best OH: (Japan) Sae Omori; (Italy) Teresa Maria Bosso
- Best MB: (Italy) Dalila Marchesini; (Brazil) Luana Kuskowski
- Best OPP: (Italy) Merit Adigwe
- Best Libero: (Japan) Ami Uchizawa

Tournament statistics
- Matches played: 104
- Attendance: 22,357 (215 per match)

The 2025 FIVB Volleyball Women's U21 World Championship was the 23rd edition of the FIVB Volleyball Women's U21 World Championship, contested by the women's national teams under the age of 21 of the members of the Fédération Internationale de Volleyball (FIVB), the sport's global governing body. It was held in Surabaya, Indonesia from 7 to 17 August 2025.

Starting with this edition, the tournament is expanded to include 24 teams instead of the 16 teams of previous editions following the decision adopted by FIVB in June 2023.

== Host selection ==
On 28 March 2024, FIVB opened the bidding process for member associations whose countries were interested in hosting one of the four Age Group World Championships in 2025 (i.e., U19 Boys' and Girls' World Championships and U21 Men's and Women's World Championships). The expression of interest of the member associations had to be submitted to FIVB by 30 April 2024, 18:00 CEST (UTC+2).

On 10 September 2024, FIVB announced that Indonesia was selected as the host for the 2025 Women's U21 World Championship.

== Qualification ==
A total of 24 national teams qualified for the final tournament. In addition to the host team and the defending champions who qualified automatically, 20 other teams qualified through five separate continental competitions which were required to be held no later than 31 December 2024. Two remaining teams entered the tournament via the Women's U21 FIVB World Ranking (as of 31 December 2024) among the teams not yet qualified.

The slot allocation per confederation was set as follows:

- Defending champions (China): 1
- AVC (Asia & Oceania): 4
- CAVB (Africa): 3
- CEV (Europe): 6
- CSV (South America): 3
- NORCECA (North, Central America and Caribbean): 4
- Host: 1
- Top teams not yet qualified as per Women's U21 FIVB World Ranking: 2

=== Qualified teams ===
The following 24 teams qualified for the tournament.

Confederation	Qualifying tournament	Team qualified	Appearances			Previous best performance
Confederation	Qualifying tournament	Team qualified	Total	First	Last	Previous best performance
AVC (Asia & Oceania)	Host nation	Indonesia	1st	Debut		None
AVC (Asia & Oceania)	Defending champions	China	22nd	1977	2023	Champions (1995, 2013, 2017, 2023)
AVC (Asia & Oceania)	2024 Asian Women's U20 Championship ( (China) Jiangmen, 1–9 July)	South Korea	14th	1977	2011	Champions (1977, 1981)
AVC (Asia & Oceania)	2024 Asian Women's U20 Championship ( (China) Jiangmen, 1–9 July)	Japan	19th	1977	2023	Champions (2019)
AVC (Asia & Oceania)	2024 Asian Women's U20 Championship ( (China) Jiangmen, 1–9 July)	Thailand	8th	1995	2023	8th place (2007)
AVC (Asia & Oceania)	2024 Asian Women's U20 Championship ( (China) Jiangmen, 1–9 July)	Vietnam	1st	Debut		None
CAVB (Africa)	2024 Women's U20 African Nations Championship ( (Tunisia) Tunis, 24–30 August)	Tunisia	4th	1995	2023	13th place (1995)
CAVB (Africa)	2024 Women's U20 African Nations Championship ( (Tunisia) Tunis, 24–30 August)	Egypt	10th	2005	2023	11th place (2005)
CAVB (Africa)	2024 Women's U20 African Nations Championship ( (Tunisia) Tunis, 24–30 August)	Algeria	5th	1993	2013	9th place (2001)
CEV (Europe)	2024 Women's U20 European Championship ( (Bulgaria) Sofia and (Republic of Ireland) Dublin, 5–17 August)	Turkey	12th	1999	2023	4th place (2017, 2019)
CEV (Europe)	2024 Women's U20 European Championship ( (Bulgaria) Sofia and (Republic of Ireland) Dublin, 5–17 August)	Italy	18th	1985	2023	Champions (2011, 2021)
CEV (Europe)	2024 Women's U20 European Championship ( (Bulgaria) Sofia and (Republic of Ireland) Dublin, 5–17 August)	Poland	13th	1991	2023	3rd place (2003)
CEV (Europe)	2024 Women's U20 European Championship ( (Bulgaria) Sofia and (Republic of Ireland) Dublin, 5–17 August)	~~Belgium~~ (Note: Belgium's volleyball federation withdrew its team from the competition citing financial problems and excessive travel costs.)	~~3rd~~	~~2011~~	~~2021~~	~~8th place (2011)~~
CEV (Europe)	2024 Women's U20 European Championship ( (Bulgaria) Sofia and (Republic of Ireland) Dublin, 5–17 August)	Bulgaria	8th	1985	2017	4th place (2009)
CEV (Europe)	2024 Women's U20 European Championship ( (Bulgaria) Sofia and (Republic of Ireland) Dublin, 5–17 August)	Czech Republic	9th (Note: Competed as Czechoslovakia in 1985 and 1991; 7 appearances as Czech Republic.)	1985	2015	6th place (1991, 1997)
CEV (Europe)	2024 Women's U20 European Championship ( (Bulgaria) Sofia and (Republic of Ireland) Dublin, 5–17 August)	Croatia	4th	2001	2007	5th place (2001)
CEV (Europe)	Women's U21 FIVB World Ranking	Serbia	11th (Note: Competed as Yugoslavia and Serbia and Montenegro in 1997, 1999 and 2005; 8 appearances as Serbia.)	1997	2023	Runners-up (2005, 2021)
CSV (South America)	2024 Women's U21 South American Championship ( (Chile) Osorno, 25–29 September)	Brazil	23rd	1977	2023	Champions (1987, 1989, 2001, 2003, 2005, 2007)
CSV (South America)	2024 Women's U21 South American Championship ( (Chile) Osorno, 25–29 September)	Argentina	14th	1977	2023	7th place (2001)
CSV (South America)	2024 Women's U21 South American Championship ( (Chile) Osorno, 25–29 September)	Chile	1st	Debut		None
NORCECA (North, Central America and Caribbean)	2024 Women's U21 NORCECA Championship ( (Canada) Toronto, 25–30 June)	United States	13th	1977	2023	4th place (2007, 2011)
NORCECA (North, Central America and Caribbean)	2024 Women's U21 NORCECA Championship ( (Canada) Toronto, 25–30 June)	Puerto Rico	10th	1981	2021	8th place (2005)
NORCECA (North, Central America and Caribbean)	2024 Women's U21 NORCECA Championship ( (Canada) Toronto, 25–30 June)	Dominican Republic	14th	1995	2023	Champions (2015)
NORCECA (North, Central America and Caribbean)	2024 Women's U21 NORCECA Championship ( (Canada) Toronto, 25–30 June)	Canada	6th	1977	1999	7th place (1977)
NORCECA (North, Central America and Caribbean)	Women's U21 FIVB World Ranking	Mexico	13th	1977	2023	4th place (1981)

== Pools composition ==
The draw was held on 4 December 2024 at the FIVB headquarters in Lausanne, Switzerland. The 24 participating teams were split into four single round-robin pools of six with the host nations and the reigning world champions receiving the highest seeds. The rest of the qualified teams are seeded in a serpentine system based on their positions in the respective FIVB World Rankings.

=== Seeding ===
Women's U21 FIVB World Ranking of each team as of 30 September 2024 are shown in brackets, except the hosts Indonesia which does not have a world ranking.

Seeded teams		Teams to be drawn			
Line 1	Line 2	Pot 1	Pot 2	Pot 3	Pot 4
Indonesia (Hosts, assigned to A1); China (1), assigned to B1; Italy (2), assigned to C1; Brazil (3), assigned to D1	Japan (4), assigned to D2; Turkey (5), assigned to C2; United States (6), assigned to B2; Argentina (7), assigned to A2	Serbia (8); Mexico (9); Tunisia (10); Egypt (11)	Poland (12); Dominican Republic (13); Thailand (14); Puerto Rico (15)	South Korea (17); Chile (17); Algeria (17); Canada (21)	Czech Republic (25); Vietnam (25); Bulgaria (28); Croatia (31)

=== Draw ===
The draw procedure also followed the serpentine system and was as follows:

- Teams from pot 4 were drawn first and were placed in line 6 of each pool starting from pool D to pool A.
- Teams from pot 3 were then drawn and placed in line 5 of each pool starting from pool A to pool D.
- Teams from pot 2 were then drawn and were placed in line 4 of each pool starting from pool D to pool A.
- Teams from pot 1 were then drawn and placed in line 3 of each pool starting from pool A to pool D.

The pools composition after the draw was as follow:

Pool A
Pos	Team
A1	Indonesia
A2	Argentina
A3	Serbia
A4	Puerto Rico
A5	Canada
A6	Vietnam

Pool B
Pos	Team
B1	China
B2	United States
B3	Mexico
B4	Dominican Republic
B5	South Korea
B6	Croatia

Pool C
Pos	Team
C1	Italy
C2	Turkey
C3	Egypt
C4	Poland
C5	Algeria
C6	Czech Republic

Pool D
Pos	Team
D1	Brazil
D2	Japan
D3	Tunisia
D4	Thailand
D5	Chile
D6	Bulgaria

== Venues ==
Surabaya, Indonesia
Jawa Pos Arena	Gelora Pancasila	Samator Volleyball Hall
Capacity: 5,000	Capacity: —	Capacity: —

== Competition formula changes ==
In June 2023 during a three-day meeting in Punta Cana, Dominican Republic, the FIVB Board of Administration approved the proposal made by its Volleyball Council to increase the number of participating teams to 24 in its Age Group World Championships (U19 and U21 in both genders). Consequently, the distribution of quotas by confederation for the Women's U21 World Championship was modified regarding previous editions, ensuring one automatic quota for the defending champion and assigning two quotas based on the corresponding FIVB Age Group World Ranking.

The new competition formula was in line with the one adopted for the 2023 FIVB Volleyball Boys' U19 World Championship, which was also contested by 24 teams.

=== Pool standing procedure ===
The ranking of teams in the preliminary round was established according the following criteria:

1. Total number of victories (matches won, matches lost);
2. Match points;
  - Match won 3–0 or 3–1: 3 points for the winner, 0 points for the loser
  - Match won 3–2: 2 points for the winner, 1 point for the loser
  - Match forfeited: 3 points for the winner, 0 points (0–25, 0–25, 0–25) for the loser
3. Sets ratio;
4. Points ratio;
5. If the tie continues between two teams: result of the last match between the tied teams. If the tie continues between three or more teams: a new classification would be made taking into consideration only the matches involving the teams in question.

== Squads ==
Each national team had to register a long-list roster with up to 25 players, which eventually had to be reduced to a final list of 12 players. Players born on or after 1 January 2005 were eligible to compete in the tournament.

== Preliminary round ==
- All times are Western Indonesia Time (UTC+07:00)

=== Pool A ===
Pos	Team	Pld	W	L	Pts	SW	SL	SR	SPW	SPL	SPR	Qualification
1	Argentina	5	5	0	15	15	1	15.000	395	271	1.458	1st–16th places
2	Serbia	5	4	1	11	13	6	2.167	439	343	1.280	1st–16th places
3	Indonesia (H)	5	2	3	8	10	10	1.000	457	379	1.206	1st–16th places
4	Puerto Rico	5	2	3	5	7	12	0.583	405	453	0.894	1st–16th places
5	Canada	5	1	4	3	6	12	0.500	400	363	1.102	17th–24th places
6	Vietnam (Note: According to the FIVB, an ineligible player from Vietnam has been disqualified from the competition. In addition to disqualifying the player, the FIVB Disciplinary Panel Sub-Committee has forfeited all the matches she participated. After the event, the case will be reviewed by the FIVB Disciplinary Panel for possible consequences.)	5	1	4	3	3	13	0.231	98	385	0.255	17th–24th places

Source: FIVB Women's U21 World Championship 2025 - Standings
(H) Host
Notes:

Date	Time		Score		Set 1	Set 2	Set 3	Set 4	Set 5	Total	Report
7 Aug	10:00	Argentina	3–0	Canada	25–19	26–24	25–15			76–58	P2 Report
7 Aug	13:00	Serbia	3–0	Puerto Rico	25–18	25–17	25–19			75–54	P2 Report
7 Aug	19:00	Indonesia	3–0	Vietnam	25–0	25–0	25–0			75–0	P2 Report
8 Aug	09:00	Argentina	3–0	Puerto Rico	25–23	25–23	25–21			75–67	P2 Report
8 Aug	14:00	Serbia	3–0	Vietnam	25–0	25–0	25–0			75–0	P2 Report
8 Aug	20:00	Indonesia	3–1	Canada	28–26	25–18	18–25	25–21		96–90	P2 Report
9 Aug	10:00	Argentina	3–1	Serbia	25–18	25–21	19–25	25–19		94–83	P2 Report
9 Aug	13:00	Canada	3–0	Vietnam	25–0	25–0	25–0			75–0	P2 Report
9 Aug	19:00	Indonesia	2–3	Puerto Rico	25–17	26–28	25–15	23–25	15–17	114–102	P2 Report
11 Aug	10:00	Argentina	3–0	Vietnam	25–0	25–0	25–0			75–0	P2 Report
11 Aug	13:00	Puerto Rico	3–1	Canada	25–20	28–26	19–25	25–20		97–91	P2 Report
11 Aug	19:00	Indonesia	2–3	Serbia	21–25	27–25	23–25	25–22	13–15	109–112	P2 Report
12 Aug	10:00	Serbia	3–1	Canada	25–22	25–22	19–25	25–17		94–86	P2 Report
12 Aug	13:00	Puerto Rico	1–3	Vietnam	17–25	21–25	25–23	22–25		85–98	P2 Report
12 Aug	19:00	Indonesia	0–3	Argentina	23–25	18–25	22–25			63–75	P2 Report

=== Pool B ===
Pos	Team	Pld	W	L	Pts	SW	SL	SR	SPW	SPL	SPR	Qualification
1	China	5	5	0	15	15	1	15.000	403	283	1.424	1st–16th places
2	United States	5	4	1	12	12	4	3.000	379	306	1.239	1st–16th places
3	South Korea	5	3	2	8	10	8	1.250	380	375	1.013	1st–16th places
4	Croatia	5	2	3	7	9	9	1.000	406	372	1.091	1st–16th places
5	Dominican Republic	5	1	4	3	3	13	0.231	279	390	0.715	17th–24th places
6	Mexico	5	0	5	0	1	15	0.067	271	392	0.691	17th–24th places

Source: FIVB Women's U21 World Championship 2025 - Standings

Date	Time		Score		Set 1	Set 2	Set 3	Set 4	Set 5	Total	Report
7 Aug	10:00	China	3–1	Croatia	23–25	25–23	27–25	25–21		100–94	P2 Report
7 Aug	13:00	United States	3–1	South Korea	25–17	25–19	19–25	25–20		94–81	P2 Report
7 Aug	16:00	Mexico	1–3	Dominican Republic	25–27	25–15	19–25	15–25		84–92	P2 Report
8 Aug	09:00	China	3–0	South Korea	25–21	25–20	25–17			75–58	P2 Report
8 Aug	14:00	United States	3–0	Dominican Republic	25–15	25–16	25–11			75–42	P2 Report
8 Aug	17:00	Mexico	0–3	Croatia	13–25	14–25	16–25			43–75	P2 Report
9 Aug	10:00	China	3–0	Dominican Republic	25–11	25–15	25–11			75–37	P2 Report
9 Aug	13:00	United States	3–0	Mexico	25–19	25–11	25–18			75–48	P2 Report
9 Aug	16:00	South Korea	3–2	Croatia	10–25	25–21	16–25	25–17	15–11	91–99	P2 Report
11 Aug	10:00	China	3–0	Mexico	25–16	25–10	25–10			75–36	P2 Report
11 Aug	13:00	United States	3–0	Croatia	27–25	25–17	25–15			77–57	P2 Report
11 Aug	16:00	Dominican Republic	0–3	South Korea	12–25	20–25	15–25			47–75	P2 Report
12 Aug	10:00	China	3–0	United States	25–20	25–12	28–26			78–58	P2 Report
12 Aug	13:00	Mexico	0–3	South Korea	20–25	22–25	18–25			60–75	P2 Report
12 Aug	16:00	Dominican Republic	0–3	Croatia	29–31	21–25	11–25			61–81	P2 Report

=== Pool C ===
Pos	Team	Pld	W	L	Pts	SW	SL	SR	SPW	SPL	SPR	Qualification
1	Poland	5	4	1	13	14	3	4.667	394	315	1.251	1st–16th places
2	Italy	5	4	1	12	14	5	2.800	434	343	1.265	1st–16th places
3	Turkey	5	3	2	9	11	8	1.375	422	364	1.159	1st–16th places
4	Czech Republic	5	3	2	8	9	8	1.125	354	355	0.997	1st–16th places
5	Egypt	5	1	4	3	3	12	0.250	269	357	0.754	17th–24th places
6	Algeria	5	0	5	0	0	15	0.000	236	375	0.629	17th–24th places

Source: FIVB Women's U21 World Championship 2025 - Standings

Date	Time		Score		Set 1	Set 2	Set 3	Set 4	Set 5	Total	Report
7 Aug	10:00	Italy	3–0	Czech Republic	25–20	25–15	25–18			75–53	P2 Report
7 Aug	13:00	Turkey	3–0	Algeria	25–12	25–11	25–14			75–37	P2 Report
7 Aug	16:00	Egypt	0–3	Poland	15–25	16–25	23–25			54–75	P2 Report
8 Aug	09:00	Italy	3–0	Algeria	25–18	25–11	25–16			75–45	P2 Report
8 Aug	14:00	Turkey	0–3	Poland	19–25	24–26	21–25			64–76	P2 Report
8 Aug	17:00	Egypt	0–3	Czech Republic	23–25	19–25	12–25			54–75	P2 Report
9 Aug	10:00	Italy	3–2	Poland	25–23	25–16	21–25	19–25	15–4	105–93	P2 Report
9 Aug	13:00	Turkey	3–0	Egypt	25–14	25–10	25–14			75–38	P2 Report
9 Aug	16:00	Algeria	0–3	Czech Republic	22–25	11–25	14–25			47–75	P2 Report
11 Aug	10:00	Italy	3–0	Egypt	25–17	25–13	25–18			75–48	P2 Report
11 Aug	13:00	Turkey	2–3	Czech Republic	22–25	24–26	25–21	25–22	8–15	104–109	P2 Report
11 Aug	16:00	Poland	3–0	Algeria	25–20	25–17	25–13			75–50	P2 Report
12 Aug	10:00	Italy	2–3	Turkey	25–21	20–25	23–25	25–18	11–15	104–104	P2 Report
12 Aug	13:00	Egypt	3–0	Algeria	25–22	25–17	25–18			75–57	P2 Report
12 Aug	16:00	Poland	3–0	Czech Republic	25–13	25–9	25–20			75–42	P2 Report

=== Pool D ===
Pos	Team	Pld	W	L	Pts	SW	SL	SR	SPW	SPL	SPR	Qualification
1	Japan	5	5	0	15	15	2	7.500	420	300	1.400	1st–16th places
2	Brazil	5	4	1	12	13	3	4.333	387	272	1.423	1st–16th places
3	Bulgaria	5	2	3	7	8	9	0.889	346	376	0.920	1st–16th places
4	Thailand	5	2	3	6	6	9	0.667	306	337	0.908	1st–16th places
5	Chile	5	2	3	5	7	12	0.583	373	424	0.880	17th–24th places
6	Tunisia	5	0	5	0	1	15	0.067	270	393	0.687	17th–24th places

Source: FIVB Women's U21 World Championship 2025 - Standings

Date	Time		Score		Set 1	Set 2	Set 3	Set 4	Set 5	Total	Report
7 Aug	16:00	Brazil	3–0	Bulgaria	25–12	25–18	25–19			75–49	P2 Report
7 Aug	19:00	Tunisia	0–3	Thailand	20–25	15–25	23–25			58–75	P2 Report
7 Aug	19:00	Japan	3–1	Chile	25–15	21–25	25–16	25–10		96–66	P2 Report
8 Aug	17:00	Japan	3–0	Thailand	25–15	25–18	25–17			75–50	P2 Report
8 Aug	20:00	Brazil	3–0	Chile	25–19	25–14	25–21			75–54	P2 Report
8 Aug	20:00	Tunisia	0–3	Bulgaria	20–25	12–25	20–25			52–75	P2 Report
9 Aug	16:00	Japan	3–0	Tunisia	25–18	25–13	25–18			75–49	P2 Report
9 Aug	19:00	Chile	3–2	Bulgaria	26–24	19–25	22–25	25–14	15–10	107–98	P2 Report
9 Aug	19:00	Brazil	3–0	Thailand	25–13	25–12	25–14			75–39	P2 Report
11 Aug	16:00	Thailand	3–0	Chile	25–22	25–16	25–15			75–53	P2 Report
11 Aug	19:00	Brazil	3–0	Tunisia	25–12	25–11	25–8			75–31	P2 Report
11 Aug	19:00	Japan	3–0	Bulgaria	25–19	25–17	25–12			75–48	P2 Report
12 Aug	16:00	Thailand	0–3	Bulgaria	20–25	24–26	23–25			67–76	P2 Report
12 Aug	19:00	Brazil	1–3	Japan	26–24	17–25	22–25	22–25		87–99	P2 Report
12 Aug	19:00	Tunisia	1–3	Chile	20–25	25–18	21–25	14–25		80–93	P2 Report

== Final round ==
- All times are Western Indonesia Time (UTC+07:00)

=== 17th–24th places ===
21st place match
16 August
Tunisia	1
Egypt	3
23rd place match
16 August
Algeria	2
Mexico	3

21st–24th semifinals
15 August
Algeria	0
Tunisia	3
15 August
Egypt	3
Mexico	0

17th–24th quarterfinals
13 August
Canada	3
Algeria	0
13 August
Dominican Republic	3
Tunisia	0
13 August
Egypt	1
Vietnam	3
13 August
Chile	3
Mexico	0

17th–20th semifinals
15 August
Canada	3
Dominican Republic	0
15 August
Vietnam	1
Chile	3

17th place match
16 August
Canada	3
Chile	1
19th place match
16 August
Dominican Republic	0
Vietnam	3

==== 17th–24th quarterfinals ====
Date	Time		Score		Set 1	Set 2	Set 3	Set 4	Set 5	Total	Report
13 Aug	10:00	Canada	3–0	Algeria	25–18	25–11	25–18			75–47	P2 Report
13 Aug	13:00	Egypt	1–3	Vietnam	16–25	24–26	25–22	20–25		85–98	P2 Report
13 Aug	16:00	Dominican Republic	3–0	Tunisia	25–21	25–22	25–17			75–60	P2 Report
13 Aug	19:00	Chile	3–0	Mexico	25–19	25–14	25–21			75–54	P2 Report

==== 21st–24th semifinals ====
Date	Time		Score		Set 1	Set 2	Set 3	Set 4	Set 5	Total	Report
15 Aug	09:00	Algeria	0–3	Tunisia	24–26	11–25	11–25			46–76	P2 Report
15 Aug	14:00	Egypt	3–0	Mexico	25–22	25–13	25–16			75–51	P2 Report

==== 17th–20th semifinals ====
Date	Time		Score		Set 1	Set 2	Set 3	Set 4	Set 5	Total	Report
15 Aug	17:00	Canada	3–0	Dominican Republic	25–20	25–23	25–23			75–66	P2 Report
15 Aug	20:00	Vietnam	1–3	Chile	17–25	15–25	25–17	20–25		77–92	P2 Report

==== 23rd place match ====
Date	Time		Score		Set 1	Set 2	Set 3	Set 4	Set 5	Total	Report
16 Aug	10:00	Algeria	2–3	Mexico	25–16	25–23	25–27	12–25	12–15	99–106	P2 Report

==== 21st place match ====
Date	Time		Score		Set 1	Set 2	Set 3	Set 4	Set 5	Total	Report
16 Aug	13:00	Tunisia	1–3	Egypt	25–19	18–25	20–25	19–25		82–94	P2 Report

==== 19th place match ====
Date	Time		Score		Set 1	Set 2	Set 3	Set 4	Set 5	Total	Report
16 Aug	16:00	Dominican Republic	0–3	Vietnam	19–25	17–25	17–25			53–75	P2 Report

==== 17th place match ====
Date	Time		Score		Set 1	Set 2	Set 3	Set 4	Set 5	Total	Report
16 Aug	19:00	Canada	3–1	Chile	25–12	23–25	25–21	25–21		98–79	P2 Report

=== 1st–16th places ===
9th place match
17 August
Czech Republic	0
United States	3
11th place match
17 August
Thailand	2
Croatia	3
13th place match
17 August
South Korea	3
Serbia	0
15th place match
17 August
Indonesia	2
Puerto Rico	3

9th–12th semifinals
16 August
Czech Republic	3
Thailand	2
16 August
United States	3
Croatia	1
13th–16th semifinals
16 August
South Korea	3
Indonesia	2
16 August
Puerto Rico	0
Serbia	3

9th–16th quarterfinals
15 August
Czech Republic	3
South Korea	1
15 August
Thailand	3
Indonesia	0
15 August
Puerto Rico	0
United States	3
15 August
Croatia	3
Serbia	0

Round of 16
13 August
Argentina	3
Czech Republic	0
13 August
Brazil	3
South Korea	0
13 August
China	3
Thailand	0
13 August
Italy	3
Indonesia	1
13 August
Poland	3
Puerto Rico	0
13 August
United States	0
Bulgaria	3
13 August
Japan	3
Croatia	1
13 August
Serbia	0
Turkey	3

Quarterfinals
15 August
Argentina	0
Brazil	3
15 August
China	0
Italy	3
15 August
Poland	1
Bulgaria	3
15 August
Japan	3
Turkey	0

Semifinals
16 August
Brazil	0
Italy	3
16 August
Bulgaria	0
Japan	3
5th–8th semifinals
16 August
Argentina	1
China	3
16 August
Poland	3
Turkey	2

Final
17 August
Italy	3
Japan	2
3rd place match
17 August
Brazil	3
Bulgaria	1
5th place match
17 August
China	3
Poland	1
7th place match
17 August
Argentina	3
Turkey	0

==== Round of 16 ====
Date	Time		Score		Set 1	Set 2	Set 3	Set 4	Set 5	Total	Report
13 Aug	10:00	China	3–0	Thailand	25–15	25–18	25–19			75–52	P2 Report
13 Aug	13:00	Brazil	3–0	South Korea	25–23	25–17	25–17			75–57	P2 Report
13 Aug	13:00	Argentina	3–0	Czech Republic	25–15	25–13	25–19			75–47	P2 Report
13 Aug	16:00	Serbia	0–3	Turkey	14–25	23–25	10–25			47–75	P2 Report
13 Aug	16:00	United States	0–3	Bulgaria	23–25	16–25	15–25			54–75	P2 Report
13 Aug	19:00	Italy	3–1	Indonesia	25–12	25–19	21–25	25–13		96–69	P2 Report
13 Aug	19:00	Japan	3–1	Croatia	25–16	22–25	25–17	25–17		97–75	P2 Report
13 Aug	21:30	Poland	3–0	Puerto Rico	25–15	25–16	25–13			75–44	P2 Report

==== 9th–16th quarterfinals ====
Date	Time		Score		Set 1	Set 2	Set 3	Set 4	Set 5	Total	Report
15 Aug	09:00	South Korea	1–3	Czech Republic	22–25	22–25	26–24	20–25		90–99	P2 Report
15 Aug	14:00	United States	3–0	Puerto Rico	25–23	25–18	25–16			75–57	P2 Report
15 Aug	17:00	Serbia	0–3	Croatia	23–25	18–25	18–25			59–75	P2 Report
15 Aug	20:00	Indonesia	0–3	Thailand	24–26	19–25	22–25			65–76	P2 Report

==== Quarterfinals ====
Date	Time		Score		Set 1	Set 2	Set 3	Set 4	Set 5	Total	Report
15 Aug	09:00	Brazil	3–0	Argentina	25–19	25–18	25–14			75–51	P2 Report
15 Aug	14:00	Bulgaria	3–1	Poland	25–23	22–25	25–23	25–18		97–89	P2 Report
15 Aug	17:00	Italy	3–0	China	25–23	25–19	25–15			75–57	P2 Report
15 Aug	20:00	Turkey	0–3	Japan	23–25	21–25	20–25			64–75	P2 Report

==== 13th–16th semifinals ====
Date	Time		Score		Set 1	Set 2	Set 3	Set 4	Set 5	Total	Report
16 Aug	10:00	Serbia	3–0	Puerto Rico	25–11	25–21	25–19			75–51	P2 Report
16 Aug	19:00	South Korea	3–2	Indonesia	22–25	25–15	17–25	25–18	15–5	104–88	P2 Report

==== 9th–12th semifinals ====
Date	Time		Score		Set 1	Set 2	Set 3	Set 4	Set 5	Total	Report
16 Aug	10:00	United States	3–1	Croatia	26–28	25–22	25–16	25–15		101–81	P2 Report
16 Aug	13:00	Czech Republic	3–2	Thailand	25–22	21–25	25–19	19–25	15–11	105–102	P2 Report

==== 5th–8th semifinals ====
Date	Time		Score		Set 1	Set 2	Set 3	Set 4	Set 5	Total	Report
16 Aug	16:00	Poland	3–2	Turkey	25–23	19–25	22–25	25–18	17–15	108–106	P2 Report
16 Aug	19:00	Argentina	1–3	China	12–25	25–22	21–25	22–25		80–97	P2 Report

==== Semifinals ====
Date	Time		Score		Set 1	Set 2	Set 3	Set 4	Set 5	Total	Report
16 Aug	13:00	Brazil	0–3	Italy	16–25	21–25	19–25			56–75	P2 Report
16 Aug	16:00	Bulgaria	0–3	Japan	17–25	18–25	13–25			48–75	P2 Report

==== 15th place match ====
Date	Time		Score		Set 1	Set 2	Set 3	Set 4	Set 5	Total	Report
17 Aug	10:00	Indonesia	2–3	Puerto Rico	24–26	25–19	25–22	22–25	12–15	108–107	P2 Report

==== 13th place match ====
Date	Time		Score		Set 1	Set 2	Set 3	Set 4	Set 5	Total	Report
17 Aug	16:00	South Korea	3–0	Serbia	25–20	25–18	25–22			75–60	P2 Report

==== 11th place match ====
Date	Time		Score		Set 1	Set 2	Set 3	Set 4	Set 5	Total	Report
17 Aug	10:00	Thailand	2–3	Croatia	25–20	21–25	21–25	25–16	12–15	104–101	P2 Report

==== 9th place match ====
Date	Time		Score		Set 1	Set 2	Set 3	Set 4	Set 5	Total	Report
17 Aug	19:00	Czech Republic	0–3	United States	21–25	20–25	18–25			59–75	P2 Report

==== 7th place match ====
Date	Time		Score		Set 1	Set 2	Set 3	Set 4	Set 5	Total	Report
17 Aug	13:00	Argentina	3–0	Turkey	25–21	25–18	25–21			75–60	P2 Report

==== 5th place match ====
Date	Time		Score		Set 1	Set 2	Set 3	Set 4	Set 5	Total	Report
17 Aug	13:00	China	3–1	Poland	23–25	25–21	25–23	25–17		98–86	P2 Report

==== 3rd place match ====
Date	Time		Score		Set 1	Set 2	Set 3	Set 4	Set 5	Total	Report
17 Aug	16:00	Brazil	3–1	Bulgaria	25–19	25–20	14–25	25–21		89–85	P2 Report

==== Final ====
Date	Time		Score		Set 1	Set 2	Set 3	Set 4	Set 5	Total	Report
17 Aug	19:00	Italy	3–2	Japan	25–22	22–25	15–25	25–19	15–11	102–102	P2 Report

== Final standing ==
Rank	Team
1st place, gold medalist(s)	Italy
2nd place, silver medalist(s)	Japan
3rd place, bronze medalist(s)	Brazil
4	Bulgaria
5	China
6	Poland
7	Argentina
8	Turkey
9	United States
10	Czech Republic
11	Croatia
12	Thailand
13	South Korea
14	Serbia
15	Puerto Rico
16	Indonesia
17	Canada
18	Chile
19	Vietnam
20	Dominican Republic
21	Egypt
22	Tunisia
23	Mexico
24	Algeria

Qualified for the 2028 World Championship

2025 Women's U21 World Champions

Italy
Third title

12–woman roster
Nicole Piomboni, Dalila Marchesini, Teresa Bosso, Helena Sassolini, Erika Esposito, Silene Martinelli, Anna Bardaro, Merit Adigwe, Lisa Esposito, Emma Magnabosco, Linda Manfredini (c), Adji Ndoye
Head coach
Gaetano Gagliardi

== Awards ==
The following individual awards were presented at the end of the tournament.

- Most valuable player
  (Italy) Merit Adigwe
- Best setter
  (Japan) Chisato Hanaoka
- Best outside spikers
  (Japan) Sae Omori
  (Italy) Teresa Maria Bosso
- Best middle blockers
  (Italy) Dalila Marchesini
  (Brazil) Luana Kuskowski
- Best opposite spiker
  (Italy) Merit Adigwe
- Best libero
  (Japan) Ami Uchizawa

== Statistics leaders ==
The statistics of leaders for each skill are recorded throughout the tournament.

Best Scorers
Rank	Player	Attacks	Blocks	Serves	Total
1	(Italy) Merit Adigwe	132	24	10	166
1	(Bulgaria) Iva Dudova	142	14	10	166
3	(Croatia) Asja Zolota	145	11	8	164
4	(Algeria) Alida Bennour	138	11	7	156
5	(Puerto Rico) Chareika Carrion Gonzalez	138	6	8	152

Best Attackers
Rank	Player	Spikes	Faults	Shots	%	Total
1	(Croatia) Asja Zolota	145	44	153	42.40	342
2	(Bulgaria) Iva Dudova	142	53	153	40.80	348
3	(Japan) Sae Omori	139	39	208	36.01	386
4	(Puerto Rico) Chareika Carrion Gonzalez	138	52	173	38.02	363
4	(Algeria) Alida Bennour	138	69	144	39.32	351

Best Blockers
Rank	Player	Blocks	Faults	Rebounds	Avg	Total
1	(Poland) Maria Splawska	40	32	50	4.44	122
2	(Italy) Dalila Marchesini	39	23	17	4.33	79
3	(Serbia) Katarina Gagić	33	29	50	4.12	112
4	(China) Li Hanyu	28	28	38	3.11	94
5	(Serbia) Teodora Skočajić	26	30	38	3.25	94

Best Servers
Rank	Player	Aces	Faults	Hits	Avg	Total
1	(South Korea) Shin Eun-ji	29	10	104	3.22	143
2	(Turkey) Liza Safronova	18	8	122	2.00	148
3	(Chile) Francisca Vásquez	15	12	84	1.88	111
4	(Canada) Claire Carter	14	11	34	2.00	59
4	(Czech Republic) Bara Rejmanova	14	11	94	1.56	119
4	(Chile) Dominga Aylwin	14	27	53	1.75	94

Best Setters
Rank	Player	Running	Faults	Still	Avg	Total
1	(Japan) Chisato Hanaoka	325	6	510	36.11	841
2	(South Korea) Kim Da-eun	302	11	465	33.56	778
3	(Italy) Helena Sassolini	224	5	409	24.89	638
4	(Thailand) Kanokporn Sangthong	202	5	491	22.44	698
5	(United States) Genevieve Harris	201	7	353	22.33	561

Best Diggers
Rank	Player	Digs	Faults	Receptions	Avg	Total
1	(Croatia) Nika Županić	152	26	45	16.89	223
2	(Japan) Ami Uchizawa	127	31	40	14.11	198
3	(Poland) Zuzanna Suska	116	26	50	14.50	192
4	(Thailand) Kalyarat Khamwong	108	29	48	12.00	185
5	(United States) Gabriella Rodriguez	98	22	37	10.89	157

Best Receivers
Rank	Player	Excellents	Faults	Serve	%	Total
1	(Indonesia) Indah Guretno	62	9	108	34.64	179
2	(Thailand) Warisara Seetaloed	61	12	156	26.64	229
3	(South Korea) Yu Ga-ram	54	12	133	27.14	199
4	(Serbia) Anja Mihajlović	49	23	127	24.62	199
4	(Japan) Sae Omori	49	4	135	26.06	188

== See also ==
- 2025 FIVB Volleyball Men's U21 World Championship
- 2025 FIVB Volleyball Girls' U19 World Championship
- 2025 FIVB Women's Volleyball World Championship
