= 2024 Asian Women's U20 Volleyball Championship =

Tournament details
- Host country: China
- City: Jiangmen
- Dates: 1–9 July
- Teams: 12 (from 1 confederation)
- Venue: 1 (in 1 host city)

Final positions
- Champions: China (13th title)
- Runners-up: Japan
- Third place: South Korea
- Fourth place: Thailand

Tournament awards
- MVP: (China) Wang Yindi
- Best Setter: (Japan) Niina Kumagai
- Best OH: (China) Li Chenxuan; (Thailand) Warissara Sritaloeed
- Best MB: (China) Chen Houyu; (South Korea) Lee Ji-yun
- Best OPP: (Japan) Miku Akimoto
- Best Libero: (China) Sun Wanjun

Tournament statistics
- Matches played: 32
- Attendance: 10,690 (334 per match)

The 2024 Asian Women's U20 Volleyball Championship was the 21st edition of the Asian Women's U20 Volleyball Championship, a biennial international volleyball tournament organized by the Asian Volleyball Confederation (AVC) with Chinese Volleyball Association (CVA). The tournament was held in Jiangmen, China, from 1 to 9 July 2024.

The top four teams qualified for the 2025 FIVB Volleyball Women's U21 World Championship as the AVC representatives.

A total of twelve teams played in the tournament, with players born on or after 1 January 2005 eligible to participate.

China won their thirteenth title of the tournament after defeating Japan in a tiebreaker match in the final. South Korea defeated Thailand in the third place match (3–1).

== Qualification ==
The following teams qualified for the tournament.

Means of qualification	Births	Qualified
Host country	1	China
Central Asian teams	2	India
Central Asian teams	2	Iran
East Asian teams	5	China
East Asian teams	5	Chinese Taipei
East Asian teams	5	Japan
East Asian teams	5	South Korea
East Asian teams	5	Hong Kong
Oceanian teams	2	Australia
Oceanian teams	2	New Zealand
Southeast Asian team	2	Thailand
Southeast Asian team	2	Vietnam
Total 12

== Pools composition ==
This is the 21tst Asian Women's U20 Volleyball Cup which will use the new competition format. Following the 2024 AVC Board of Administration's unanimous decision, the new format will see teams being drawn into three or four pools up to the total amount of the participating teams. Each team as well as the host side will be assigned into a pool according to their previous ranking (2022 Asian Women's U20 Volleyball Championship). As the three best-ranked teams will be drawn in the same Pool A, the next best three will contest Pool B, the next best three will contest Pool C. Pool D will comprise teams finishing next best four teams.

Pool A	Pool B	Pool C	Pool D
China (Host)	Japan (1)	Thailand (3)	South Korea (4)
Kazakhstan (8)	India (7)	Iran (6)	Chinese Taipei (5)
Australia (–)	Hong Kong (–)	Vietnam (–)	New Zealand (–)

== Preliminary round ==
- All times are China Standard Time (UTC+08:00).

=== Pool A ===
Pos	Team	Pld	W	L	Pts	SW	SL	SR	SPW	SPL	SPR	Qualification
1	China (H)	2	2	0	6	6	0	MAX	150	68	2.206	Pool E
2	Kazakhstan	2	1	1	2	3	5	0.600	132	182	0.725	Pool E
3	Australia	2	0	2	1	2	6	0.333	148	180	0.822	9th–12th places

Source: Daily Bulletin No.4
(H) Host

Date	Time		Score		Set 1	Set 2	Set 3	Set 4	Set 5	Total	Report
1 Jul	15:30	Kazakhstan	3–2	Australia	18–25	25–22	21–25	25–21	16–14	105–107	Report
2 Jul	18:00	China	3–0	Kazakhstan	25–8	25–8	25–11			75–27	Report
3 Jul	18:00	Australia	0–3	China	13–25	15–25	13–25			41–75	Report

=== Pool B ===
Pos	Team	Pld	W	L	Pts	SW	SL	SR	SPW	SPL	SPR	Qualification
1	Japan	2	2	0	6	6	0	MAX	150	78	1.923	Pool F
2	India	2	1	1	2	3	5	0.600	139	168	0.827	Pool F
3	Hong Kong	2	0	2	1	2	6	0.333	135	178	0.758	9th–12th places

Source: Daily Bulletin No.4

Date	Time		Score		Set 1	Set 2	Set 3	Set 4	Set 5	Total	Report
1 Jul	13:00	Japan	3–0	India	25–14	25–11	25–11			75–36	Report
2 Jul	09:00	Hong Kong	0–3	Japan	14–25	13–25	15–25			42–75	Report
3 Jul	15:30	India	3–2	Hong Kong	16–25	22–25	25–20	25–16	15–7	103–93	Report

=== Pool C ===
Pos	Team	Pld	W	L	Pts	SW	SL	SR	SPW	SPL	SPR	Qualification
1	Thailand	2	2	0	6	6	0	MAX	150	111	1.351	Pool E
2	Vietnam	2	1	1	3	3	3	1.000	133	128	1.039	Pool E
3	Iran	2	0	2	0	0	6	0.000	106	150	0.707	9th–12th places

Source: Daily Bulletin No.4

Date	Time		Score		Set 1	Set 2	Set 3	Set 4	Set 5	Total	Report
1 Jul	09:00	Thailand	3–0	Vietnam	25–23	25–22	25–13			75–58	Report
2 Jul	13:00	Vietnam	3–0	Iran	25–18	25–16	25–19			75–53	Report
3 Jul	13:00	Iran	0–3	Thailand	14–25	22–25	17–25			53–75	Report

=== Pool D ===
Pos	Team	Pld	W	L	Pts	SW	SL	SR	SPW	SPL	SPR	Qualification
1	South Korea	2	2	0	6	6	0	MAX	150	87	1.724	Pool F
2	Chinese Taipei	2	1	1	3	3	3	1.000	124	129	0.961	Pool F
3	New Zealand	2	0	2	0	0	6	0.000	93	151	0.616	9th–12th places

Source: Daily Bulletin No.4

Date	Time		Score		Set 1	Set 2	Set 3	Set 4	Set 5	Total	Report
1 Jul	18:00	Chinese Taipei	0–3	South Korea	13–25	18–25	17–25			48–75	Report
2 Jul	15:30	New Zealand	0–3	South Korea	19–25	13–25	7–25			39–75	Report
3 Jul	09:00	Chinese Taipei	3–0	New Zealand	25–15	25–15	26–24			76–54	Report

== Classification round ==
- All times are China Standard Time (UTC+08:00).

=== Pool E ===
Pos	Team	Pld	W	L	Pts	SW	SL	SR	SPW	SPL	SPR	Qualification
1	China	3	3	0	9	9	0	MAX	225	120	1.875	Final four
2	Thailand	3	2	1	6	6	3	2.000	204	182	1.121	Final four
3	Vietnam	3	1	2	3	3	7	0.429	194	228	0.851	5th–8th places
4	Kazakhstan	3	0	3	0	1	9	0.111	154	247	0.623	5th–8th places

Source: Daily Bulletin No.7

Date	Time		Score		Set 1	Set 2	Set 3	Set 4	Set 5	Total	Report
5 Jul	16.30	Kazakhstan	0–3	Thailand	17–25	16–25	16–25			49–75	Report
5 Jul	19.00	China	3–0	Vietnam	25–14	25–13	25–12			75–39	Report
6 Jul	16.30	Vietnam	3–1	Kazakhstan	22–25	25–20	25–18	25–15		97–78	Report
6 Jul	19.00	China	3–0	Thailand	25–23	25–11	25–20			75–54	Report

=== Pool F ===
Pos	Team	Pld	W	L	Pts	SW	SL	SR	SPW	SPL	SPR	Qualification
1	Japan	3	3	0	9	9	1	9.000	248	156	1.590	Final four
2	South Korea	3	2	1	6	7	3	2.333	230	194	1.186	Final four
3	Chinese Taipei	3	1	2	3	3	6	0.500	163	198	0.823	5th–8th places
4	India	3	0	3	0	0	9	0.000	129	225	0.573	5th–8th places

Source: Daily Bulletin No.7

Date	Time		Score		Set 1	Set 2	Set 3	Set 4	Set 5	Total	Report
5 Jul	10.00	South Korea	3–0	India	25–16	25–18	25–10			75–44	Report
5 Jul	14.00	Japan	3–0	Chinese Taipei	25–11	25–16	25–13			75–40	Report
6 Jul	10.00	Japan	3–1	South Korea	25–18	23–25	25–17	25–20		98–80	Report
6 Jul	14.00	India	0–3	Chinese Taipei	15–25	20–25	13–25			48–75	Report

== Final round ==
- All times are China Standard Time (UTC+08:00).

=== 9th–12th places ===
9th–12th semifinals
4 July
Australia	1
Iran	3
4 July
Hong Kong	1
New Zealand	3

9th place match
7 July
Iran	3
New Zealand	1
11th place match
7 July
Australia	3
Hong Kong	1

==== 9th–12th semifinals ====
Date	Time		Score		Set 1	Set 2	Set 3	Set 4	Set 5	Total	Report
4 Jul	16:30	Australia	1–3	Iran	30–28	23–25	19–25	19–25		91–103	Report
4 Jul	19:00	Hong Kong	1–3	New Zealand	25–12	14–25	29–31	23–25		91–93	Report

==== 11th place match ====
Date	Time		Score		Set 1	Set 2	Set 3	Set 4	Set 5	Total	Report
7 Jul	10:00	Australia	3–1	Hong Kong	25–11	25–23	16–25	25–22		91–81	Report

==== 9th place match ====
Date	Time		Score		Set 1	Set 2	Set 3	Set 4	Set 5	Total	Report
7 Jul	14:00	Iran	3–1	New Zealand	25–15	25–27	25–13	25–16		100–71	Report

=== 5th–8th places ===
5th–8th semifinals
7 July
Vietnam	3
India	0
7 July
Kazakhstan	0
Chinese Taipei	3

5th place match
8 July
Vietnam	3
Chinese Taipei	0
7th place match
8 July
India	0
Kazakhstan	3

==== 5th–8th semifinals ====
Date	Time		Score		Set 1	Set 2	Set 3	Set 4	Set 5	Total	Report
7 Jul	16:30	Vietnam	3–0	India	25–15	25–12	25–18			75–45	Report
7 Jul	19:00	Kazakhstan	0–3	Chinese Taipei	22–25	22–25	23–25			67–75	Report

==== 7th place match ====
Date	Time		Score		Set 1	Set 2	Set 3	Set 4	Set 5	Total	Report
8 Jul	10:00	India	0–3	Kazakhstan	21–25	17–25	21–25			59–75	Report

==== 5th place match ====
Date	Time		Score		Set 1	Set 2	Set 3	Set 4	Set 5	Total	Report
8 Jul	14:00	Vietnam	3–0	Chinese Taipei	25–17	25–19	25–15			75–51	Report

=== Final four ===
Semifinals
8 July
Thailand	0
Japan	3
8 July
China	3
South Korea	1

Final match
9 July
Japan	2
China	3
3rd place match
9 July
Thailand	1
South Korea	3

==== Semifinals ====
Date	Time		Score		Set 1	Set 2	Set 3	Set 4	Set 5	Total	Report
8 Jul	16:30	Thailand	0–3	Japan	22–25	11–25	20–25			53–75	Report
8 Jul	19:00	China	3–1	South Korea	25–6	25–4	20–25	25–17		95–52	Report

==== 3rd place match ====
Date	Time		Score		Set 1	Set 2	Set 3	Set 4	Set 5	Total	Report
9 Jul	16:30	Thailand	1–3	South Korea	21–25	25–18	22–25	23–25		91–93	Report

==== Final ====
Date	Time		Score		Set 1	Set 2	Set 3	Set 4	Set 5	Total	Report
9 Jul	19:00	Japan	2–3	China	25–23	21–25	17–25	25–14	10–15	98–102	Report

== Final standing ==
Rank	Team
1st place, gold medalist(s)	China
2nd place, silver medalist(s)	Japan
3rd place, bronze medalist(s)	South Korea
4	Thailand
5	Vietnam
6	Chinese Taipei
7	Kazakhstan
8	India
9	Iran
10	New Zealand
11	Australia
12	Hong Kong

Qualified for the 2025 U21 World Championship
Qualified for the 2025 U21 World Championship as defending champions

2024 Asian Women's U20 champions

China
13th title

12–woman roster
Shan Linqian, Duan Mengke, Dong Yuhan, Guo Weilin, Li Chenxuan, Wang Yindi (c), Chen Houyu, Li Yuening, Zhu Hanging, Sun Wanjun, Fan Boning, Guo Xiangling
Head Coach
Kuang Qi

== Awards ==
Wang Yindi was the 2024 Asian Women's U20 Most Valuable Player.

- Most valuable player
  Wang Yindi (CHN)
- Best setter
  Niina Kumagai (JPN)
- Best outside spikers
  Li Chenxuan (CHN)
  Warisara Seetaloed (THA)
- Best middle blockers
  Chen Houyu (CHN)
  Lee Ji-yun (KOR)
- Best opposite spiker
  Miku Akimoto (JPN)
- Best libero
  Sun Wanjun (CHN)

== Qualified teams for the 2025 FIVB U21 World Championship ==
The following teams from AVC qualified for the 2025 FIVB Volleyball Women's U21 World Championship.

Team	Qualified on	Previous appearances in the FIVB Volleyball Women's U21 World Championship (Note: Bold indicates defending champions of FIVB U21 World Championship for last year.)
**China**	28 March 2024	21 (1977, 1981, 1985, 1987, 1989, 1991, 1993, 1995, 1997, 1999, 2001, 2003, 2005, 2007, 2009, 2011, 2013, 2015, 2017, 2019, 2023)
Japan	6 July 2024	18 (1977, 1981, 1985, 1987, 1989, 1991, 1993, 1995, 1997, 1999, 2005, 2007, 2011, 2013, 2015, 2017, 2019, 2023)
South Korea	6 July 2024	13 (1977, 1981, 1985, 1987, 1989, 1991, 1993, 1995, 1997, 1999, 2001, 2003, 2011)
Thailand	6 July 2024	7 (1995, 2003, 2007, 2009, 2013, 2021, 2023)
Vietnam	8 July 2024	0 (None)

== See also ==
- 2024 Asian Men's U20 Volleyball Championship
- 2024 Asian Women's U18 Volleyball Championship
