= Thailand women's national under-21 volleyball team =

Thailand Under-21
- Association: Thailand Volleyball Association
- Confederation: AVC
- Head coach: Chamnan Dokmai

Uniforms
Home	Away	Third

FIVB U21 World Championship
- Appearances: 8 (First in 1995)
- Best result: 8th : (2007)

AVC U20 Asian Championship
- Appearances: 16 (First in 1986)
- Best result: (silver) Silver : (2002)
Honours
Asian Championship
Silver medal – second place	2002 Ho Chi Minh City
Bronze medal – third place	2016 Nakhon Ratchasima
Bronze medal – third place	2018 Hanoi
Bronze medal – third place	2022 Nur-Sultan

The Thailand women's national under-21 volleyball team (Thai: วอลเลย์บอลหญิงทีมชาติไทยรุ่นอายุไม่เกิน 20 ปี) represents the Thailand for the under-20 and 19 level in international volleyball competitions. It is managed by the Thailand Volleyball Association.

== Results ==
=== U21 World Championship ===
Champions Runners up Third place Fourth place

World Championship record
Year	Round	Position	GP	MW	ML	SW	SL	Squad
(Brazil) 1977	Did not qualify							
(Mexico) 1981	Did not qualify							
(Italy) 1985	Did not qualify							
(South Korea) 1987	Did not qualify							
(Peru) 1989	Did not qualify							
(Czechoslovakia) 1991	Did not qualify							
(Brazil) 1993	Did not qualify							
(Thailand) 1995	First Round	13th Place	3	0	3	0	9	Squad
(Poland) 1997	Did not qualify							
(Canada) 1999	Did not qualify							
(Dominican Republic) 2001	Did not qualify							
(Thailand) 2003	Round of 16	9th Place	4	1	3	7	10	Squad
(Turkey) 2005	Did not Qualify							
(Thailand) 2007	First Round	8th Place	7	3	4	10	10	Squad
(Mexico) 2009	First Round	14th Place	8	2	6	9	21	Squad
(Peru) 2011	Did not qualify							
(Czech Republic) 2013	First Round	18th Place	7	2	5	8	15	Squad
(Puerto Rico) 2015	Did not qualify							
(Mexico) 2017	Did not qualify							
(Mexico) 2019	Did not qualify							
(Belgium) (Netherlands) 2021	First Round	14th Place	8	2	6	6	18	
(Mexico) 2023	First Round	15th Place	8	1	7	6	21	
(Indonesia) 2025	Round of 16	12th Place	9	3	6	13	18	
Total	0 Titles	8/23	54	14	40	59	122	—

=== U20 Asian Championship ===
Champions Runners up Third place Fourth place

Asian Championship record
Year	Round	Position	GP	MW	ML	SW	SL	Squad
(Thailand) 1986	Semifinals	4th Place						—
(Indonesia) 1988	First Round	6th Place						—
(Thailand) 1990		6th Place						—
(Malaysia) 1992	5th–8th places	6th Place						—
(Philippines) 1994	Round Robin	5th Place						—
(Thailand) 1996	Round Robin	5th Place						—
(Thailand) 1998	Semifinals	4th Place						—
(Philippines) 2000	Round Robin	4th Place						—
(Vietnam) 2002	Final	Runners-Up						—
(Sri Lanka) 2004	First Round	5th Place						—
(Thailand) 2006	Semifinals	4th Place						—
(Taiwan) 2008	Quarterfinals	5th Place						—
(Vietnam) 2010	Semifinals	4th Place						—
(Thailand) 2012	Semifinals	4th Place						—
(Taiwan) 2014	Semifinals	4th Place						—
(Thailand) 2016	Semifinals	3rd Place					-	Squad
(Vietnam) 2018	Semifinals	3rd Place						Squad
(China) 2020	Cancelled							
(Kazakhstan) 2022	Semifinals	3rd Place						Squad
(China) 2024	Semifinals	4th Place						Squad
Total	0 Titles	19/19	_	_	_	_	_	_

== Players ==
=== Current squad ===
The following 12 players were called up for the 2021 FIVB Volleyball Women's U20 World Championship in Belgium, Netherlands.

Thailand women's national under-20 volleyball team squad
#	Pos	Player	Date of birth (age)	Height	2020-21 Club
4	S	Sasiprapa Maneewong	10 October 2003 (age 23)	1.73	(Thailand) Supreme Chonburi
15	S	Suphatcha Khamtalaksa^{NAT, U18}	28 August 2002 (age 24)	1.73	(Thailand) 3BB Nakornnont
20	OH	Panatda Chaipetch	23 June 2003 (age 23)	1.80	(Thailand) Bodindecha
16	WS	Waranya Srilaoong	20 October 2002 (age 24)	1.73	(Thailand) Sripatum University
12	OH	Pimtawan Thongyos^{U18}	30 April 2002 (age 24)	1.73	(Thailand) Supreme Chonburi
1	OH	Wiranyupa Inchan^{NAT, U18}	23 April 2002 (age 24)	1.82	(Thailand) Diamond Food VC
17	OPP	Panjaree Maneesri	17 October 2002 (age 24)	1.74	(Thailand) Southeast Asia University
9	L	Jidapa Nahuanong^{NAT, U18}	22 February 2002 (age 24)	1.65	(Thailand) 3BB Nakornnont
5	MB	Wimonrat Thanapan^{NAT, U18}	2 April 2002 (age 24)	1.80	(Thailand) 3BB Nakornnont
10	MB	Saowapha Soosuk^{U18}	9 March 2002 (age 24)	1.73	(Thailand) 3BB Nakornnont
3	MB	Amornrada Loeksawang	12 August 2002 (age 24)	1.75	(Thailand) Sripatum University
11	MB	Kanyarat Kunmueng	15 October 2002 (age 24)	1.80	(Thailand) Bodindecha

=== Player statistics ===
Thailand women's national under-20 volleyball team squad
#	Pos	Name	Height	Weight	Spike	Block
1	S	Thanawan Arunmueng	1.72			
2	OPP	Panjaree Maneesri	1.74			
3	L	Jidapa Nahuanong^{NAT, U18}	1.65	53	2.48	2.41
4	MB	Wimonrat Thanapan^{NAT, U18}	1.80	59	2.89	2.83
5	MB	Saowapha Soosuk^{U18}	1.73	59	2.82	2.79
6	OH	Wiranyupa Inchan^{NAT, U18}	1.82	70	2.90	2.87
7	S	Sasiprapa Maneewong	1.73	73		
8	S	Suphatcha Khamtalaksa^{NAT, U18}	1.77	65	2.88	2.75
9	WS	Waranya Srilaoong	1.73	62	2.82	2.80
10	MB	Aree Seemok^{U18}	1.75	66	2.79	2.69
11	MB	Amornrada Rueksawang	1.75			
12	OH	Pimtawan Thongyos^{U18}	1.73	60	2.68	2.50
13	OPP	Siriporn Srikrue	1.75			
14	OPP	Kewalin Chuemuangphan	1.74	60	2.81	2.79
15	TBA	Chananya Kamonklang				
16	OH	Kanyarat Kunmueng	1.80			
17	OH	Panatda Chaipetch	1.80			
18	S	Naphat Rueangdet	1.69			

Notes:

- ^{OH} Outside Hitter
- ^{OPP} Opposite Spiker
- ^{S} Setter
- ^{MB} Middle Blocker
- ^{L} Libero
- ^{NAT} National team
- ^{U23} Under-23 team

== Results and fixtures ==
Thailand women's national under-20 volleyball team results and fixtures
Date	Competition	Location	Opponent	Result
23 July 2016	Asian Championship – Preliminary round	Thailand	Vietnam	W 3–0
25 July 2016	Asian Championship – Preliminary round	Thailand	Sri Lanka	W 3–0
27 July 2016	Asian Championship – Second round	Thailand	India	W 3–0
28 July 2016	Asian Championship – Second round	Thailand	Japan	L 2–3
29 July 2016	Asian Championship – Quarter-finals	Thailand	Chinese Taipei	W 3–1
30 July 2016	Asian Championship – Semi-finals	Thailand	China	L 0–3
31 July 2016	Asian Championship – Third place match	Thailand	Vietnam	W 3–1

== See also ==
- Thailand women's national volleyball team
- Thailand women's national under-19 volleyball team
- Thailand women's national under-23 volleyball team
