= 2016 Asian Junior Women's Volleyball Championship squads =

This article shows the rosters of all participating teams at the 2016 Asian Junior Women's Volleyball Championship in Nakhon Ratchasima, Thailand.

== Pool A ==
=== Thailand ===
The following is the Thai roster in the 2016 Asian Junior Championship.

Head Coach: Chamnan Dokmai

| No. | Name | Date of birth | Height | Weight | Spike | Block | 2016 club |
|---|---|---|---|---|---|---|---|
| 1 | Anisa Yotpinit | 23 June 1998 | 1.64 m (5 ft 5 in) | 58 kg (128 lb) | 245 cm (96 in) | 265 cm (104 in) | (Thailand) King-Bangkok |
| 2 | Thananwan Thongsen | 26 December 1998 | 1.68 m (5 ft 6 in) | 70 kg (150 lb) | 264 cm (104 in) | 250 cm (98 in) | (Thailand) Supreme |
| 3 | Wipawee Srithong | 28 January 1999 | 1.75 m (5 ft 9 in) | 64 kg (141 lb) | 291 cm (115 in) | 276 cm (109 in) | (Thailand) Supreme |
| 6 | Chutimon Sagon | 2 October 1998 | 1.69 m (5 ft 7 in) | 53 kg (117 lb) | 283 cm (111 in) | 271 cm (107 in) | (Thailand) King-Bangkok |
| 7 | Tichakorn Boonlert | 22 March 2001 | 1.79 m (5 ft 10 in) | 77 kg (170 lb) | 282 cm (111 in) | 293 cm (115 in) | (Thailand) 3BB Nakhonnont |
| 8 | Tirawan Sang-ob | 26 April 1998 | 1.76 m (5 ft 9 in) | 60 kg (130 lb) | 285 cm (112 in) | 275 cm (108 in) | (Thailand) Supreme |
| 9 | Chatchu-on Moksri | 6 November 1999 | 1.78 m (5 ft 10 in) | 58 kg (128 lb) | 294 cm (116 in) | 287 cm (113 in) | (Thailand) 3BB Nakhonnont |
| 12 | Pimpichaya Kokram | 16 June 1998 | 1.78 m (5 ft 10 in) | 57 kg (126 lb) | 300 cm (120 in) | 289 cm (114 in) | (Thailand) 3BB Nakhonnont |
| 13 | Natthanicha Jaisaen (C) | 21 May 1998 | 1.72 m (5 ft 8 in) | 55 kg (121 lb) | 283 cm (111 in) | 276 cm (109 in) | (Thailand) Bangkok Glass |
| 14 | Kanittha Juangjan | 16 January 1998 | 1.75 m (5 ft 9 in) | 64 kg (141 lb) | 297 cm (117 in) | 278 cm (109 in) | (Thailand) Thai-Denmark |
| 15 | Supawan Boonsaklert | 22 January 1999 | 1.73 m (5 ft 8 in) | 60 kg (130 lb) | 285 cm (112 in) | 273 cm (107 in) | (Thailand) 3BB Nakhonnont |
| 18 | Paweenut Ruengram | 25 August 1998 | 1.81 m (5 ft 11 in) | 71 kg (157 lb) | 296 cm (117 in) | 283 cm (111 in) | (Thailand) Bangkok Glass |

=== Sri Lanka ===
The following is the Sri Lankan roster in the 2016 Asian Junior Championship.

Head Coach: Janaka Indrajith

| No. | Name | Date of birth | Height | Weight | Spike | Block | 2015 club |
|---|---|---|---|---|---|---|---|
| 1 | Ishara Ilangakon | 2 July 2000 | 1.70 m (5 ft 7 in) | 58 kg (128 lb) | 269 cm (106 in) | 254 cm (100 in) | |
| 2 | Chamali Karunarathina (C) | 28 April 1999 | 1.66 m (5 ft 5 in) | 50 kg (110 lb) | 264 cm (104 in) | 248 cm (98 in) | |
| 3 | Rashmi Perera | 16 February 1998 | 1.74 m (5 ft 9 in) | 71 kg (157 lb) | 263 cm (104 in) | 254 cm (100 in) | |
| 4 | Amoda Perera | 26 October 1998 | 1.65 m (5 ft 5 in) | 55 kg (121 lb) | 265 cm (104 in) | 250 cm (98 in) | |
| 5 | Dinusha Zoysa | 7 June 1999 | 1.61 m (5 ft 3 in) | 50 kg (110 lb) | 256 cm (101 in) | 243 cm (96 in) | |
| 7 | Sachini Weerawardana | 24 December 1998 | 1.72 m (5 ft 8 in) | 67 kg (148 lb) | 266 cm (105 in) | 253 cm (100 in) | |
| 8 | Hansika Thilaka | 13 February 2000 | 1.72 m (5 ft 8 in) | 57 kg (126 lb) | 279 cm (110 in) | 264 cm (104 in) | |
| 9 | Sachini Adikari | 29 July 1998 | 1.65 m (5 ft 5 in) | 51 kg (112 lb) | 272 cm (107 in) | 254 cm (100 in) | |
| 11 | Shakira Hewagamage | 5 November 1999 | 1.72 m (5 ft 8 in) | 64 kg (141 lb) | 273 cm (107 in) | 262 cm (103 in) | |
| 12 | Jayani Kurukula | 16 October 1999 | 1.77 m (5 ft 10 in) | 70 kg (150 lb) | 273 cm (107 in) | 258 cm (102 in) | |
| 13 | Shashika Thilaka | 12 May 1999 | 1.75 m (5 ft 9 in) | 65 kg (143 lb) | 270 cm (110 in) | 256 cm (101 in) | |
| 14 | Shamila Athukoralage | 19 October 1998 | 1.55 m (5 ft 1 in) | 49 kg (108 lb) | 251 cm (99 in) | 231 cm (91 in) | |

=== Vietnam ===
The following is the Vietnamese roster in the 2016 Asian Junior Championship.

Head Coach: Shuto Koichi

| No. | Name | Date of birth | Height | Weight | Spike | Block | 2016 club |
|---|---|---|---|---|---|---|---|
| 1 | Luu Thi Ly Ly | 20 October 1998 | 1.68 m (5 ft 6 in) | 65 kg (143 lb) | 283 cm (111 in) | 278 cm (109 in) | (Vietnam) Thông tin LVPB |
| 3 | Dang Thu Huyen | 14 February 2002 | 1.75 m (5 ft 9 in) | 59 kg (130 lb) | 283 cm (111 in) | 279 cm (110 in) | (Vietnam) Thông tin LVPB |
| 6 | Pham Thi Nguyet Anh | 13 December 1998 | 1.74 m (5 ft 9 in) | 60 kg (130 lb) | 285 cm (112 in) | 280 cm (110 in) | (Vietnam) Thông tin LVPB |
| 7 | Duong Thi Hen | 15 August 1998 | 1.74 m (5 ft 9 in) | 56 kg (123 lb) | 290 cm (110 in) | 282 cm (111 in) | (Vietnam) VTV Bình Điền Long An |
| 8 | Tran Viet Huong | 13 October 1998 | 1.74 m (5 ft 9 in) | 52 kg (115 lb) | 285 cm (112 in) | 280 cm (110 in) | (Vietnam) Thông tin LVPB |
| 9 | Dang Thi Kim Thanh | 28 March 1999 | 1.77 m (5 ft 10 in) | 62 kg (137 lb) | 283 cm (111 in) | 279 cm (110 in) | (Vietnam) VTV Bình Điền Long An |
| 12 | Nguyen Thi Uyen | 18 August 1999 | 1.78 m (5 ft 10 in) | 70 kg (150 lb) | 287 cm (113 in) | 282 cm (111 in) | (Vietnam) PVD Thái Bình |
| 14 | Hoang Thi Phuong Anh | 20 January 2000 | 1.72 m (5 ft 8 in) | 61 kg (134 lb) | 285 cm (112 in) | 280 cm (110 in) | (Vietnam) Vietinbank |
| 17 | Tran Tu Linh | 10 July 1999 | 1.80 m (5 ft 11 in) | 61 kg (134 lb) | 283 cm (111 in) | 279 cm (110 in) | (Vietnam) Vietinbank |
| 18 | Luu Thi Hue | 2 January 1999 | 1.80 m (5 ft 11 in) | 58 kg (128 lb) | 292 cm (115 in) | 286 cm (113 in) | (Vietnam) Vietinbank |
| 20 | Nguyen Thu Hoai (C) | 16 September 1998 | 1.72 m (5 ft 8 in) | 58 kg (128 lb) | 280 cm (110 in) | 276 cm (109 in) | (Vietnam) Vietinbank |

== Pool B ==
=== China ===
The following is the Chinese roster in the 2016 Asian Junior Championship.

Head Coach: Shen Mang

| No. | Name | Date of birth | Height | Weight | Spike | Block | 2016 club |
|---|---|---|---|---|---|---|---|
| 2 | Yang Hanyu | 12 October 1999 | 1.95 m (6 ft 5 in) | 80 kg (180 lb) | 308 cm (121 in) | 298 cm (117 in) | (China) Shandong |
| 4 | Qian Jingwen | 11 May 1998 | 1.86 m (6 ft 1 in) | 70 kg (150 lb) | 305 cm (120 in) | 297 cm (117 in) | (China) Shandong |
| 5 | Jiang Jing (C) | 4 March 1998 | 1.74 m (5 ft 9 in) | 80 kg (180 lb) | 297 cm (117 in) | 291 cm (115 in) | (China) Shanghai |
| 6 | Zhang Yuqian | 18 August 1998 | 1.85 m (6 ft 1 in) | 72 kg (159 lb) | 302 cm (119 in) | 294 cm (116 in) | (China) Shanghai |
| 7 | Xie Xing | 28 November 1998 | 1.84 m (6 ft 0 in) | 68 kg (150 lb) | 271 cm (107 in) | 265 cm (104 in) | (China) Jiangsu |
| 8 | Cai Yaqian | 29 June 1998 | 1.82 m (6 ft 0 in) | 71 kg (157 lb) | 300 cm (120 in) | 290 cm (110 in) | (China) Shandong |
| 9 | Ouyang Qianqian | 15 January 1998 | 1.85 m (6 ft 1 in) | 70 kg (150 lb) | 303 cm (119 in) | 296 cm (117 in) | (China) Army |
| 10 | Zang Qianqian | 14 August 1998 | 1.74 m (5 ft 9 in) | 60 kg (130 lb) | 271 cm (107 in) | 265 cm (104 in) | (China) Jiangsu |
| 11 | Cai Xiaoqing | 5 April 1998 | 1.68 m (5 ft 6 in) | 60 kg (130 lb) | 295 cm (116 in) | 285 cm (112 in) | (China) Henan |
| 12 | Wu Han | 23 April 1998 | 1.83 m (6 ft 0 in) | 64 kg (141 lb) | 294 cm (116 in) | 284 cm (112 in) | (China) Jiangsu |
| 13 | Gao Yi | 22 July 1998 | 1.93 m (6 ft 4 in) | 66 kg (146 lb) | 304 cm (120 in) | 298 cm (117 in) | (China) Army |
| 14 | Xu Jianan | 2 April 1998 | 1.67 m (5 ft 6 in) | 60 kg (130 lb) | 301 cm (119 in) | 293 cm (115 in) | (China) Liaoning |

=== Kazakhstan ===
The following is the Kazakhstani roster in the 2016 Asian Junior Championship.

Head Coach: Yelena Pavlova

| No. | Name | Date of birth | Height | 2016 club |
|---|---|---|---|---|
| 1 | Sabira Bekisheva | 21 February 1998 | 1.70 m (5 ft 7 in) | Kazakhstan |
| 2 | Kristina Belova | 29 November 1998 | 1.81 m (5 ft 11 in) | Kazakhstan |
| 3 | Kristina Inozemtseva (C) | 13 October 1998 | 1.80 m (5 ft 11 in) | Kazakhstan |
| 5 | Alexandra Mechshaninova | 29 August 1999 | 1.83 m (6 ft 0 in) | Kazakhstan |
| 6 | Gulnaz Altayeva | 24 March 1998 | 1.80 m (5 ft 11 in) | Kazakhstan |
| 7 | Margarita Belchenko | 21 March 1999 | 1.82 m (6 ft 0 in) | Kazakhstan |
| 9 | Mariya Kim | 7 August 1998 | 1.81 m (5 ft 11 in) | Kazakhstan |
| 12 | Gulnaz Altaibekova | 17 October 1999 | 1.78 m (5 ft 10 in) | Kazakhstan |
| 15 | Irina Shanina | 7 September 1998 | 1.65 m (5 ft 5 in) | Kazakhstan |
| 16 | Dinara Kozhamberdina | 1 December 1998 | 1.80 m (5 ft 11 in) | Kazakhstan |
| 17 | Farida Ramazanova | 24 July 1998 | 1.70 m (5 ft 7 in) | Kazakhstan |
| 18 | Anastassiya Kostenko | 22 May 1999 | 1.84 m (6 ft 0 in) | Kazakhstan |

=== Hong Kong ===
The following is the Hong Kong roster in the 2016 Asian Junior Championship.

Head Coach: Cheung King Fai

| No. | Name | Date of birth | Height | 2016 club |
|---|---|---|---|---|
| 1 | So Ka Po | 18 January 2000 | 1.58 m (5 ft 2 in) | Hong Kong |
| 2 | Chan Ming Wai | 26 March 1998 | 1.75 m (5 ft 9 in) | Hong Kong |
| 4 | Tam Hin Ching (C) | 4 January 1998 | 1.78 m (5 ft 10 in) | Hong Kong |
| 5 | Lam Natalie | 4 November 2000 | 1.62 m (5 ft 4 in) | Hong Kong |
| 6 | Wong Sze Wing | 19 January 1999 | 1.70 m (5 ft 7 in) | Hong Kong |
| 7 | Yick Wing Sum | 7 October 2000 | 1.80 m (5 ft 11 in) | Hong Kong |
| 8 | Wong Yuen Lam | 17 August 1999 | 1.74 m (5 ft 9 in) | Hong Kong |
| 9 | Yip Hoi Tik | 5 August 2000 | 1.81 m (5 ft 11 in) | Hong Kong |
| 10 | Choy Hoi Ting | 14 March 2000 | 1.68 m (5 ft 6 in) | Hong Kong |
| 11 | Pang Wing Nam | 9 June 1998 | 1.64 m (5 ft 5 in) | Hong Kong |
| 13 | Lau Ho Ting | 31 July 1999 | 1.72 m (5 ft 8 in) | Hong Kong |
| 16 | Chan Hoi Ying | 18 August 2000 | 1.78 m (5 ft 10 in) | Hong Kong |

=== New Zealand ===
The following is the New Zealand roster in the 2016 Asian Junior Championship.

Head Coach: Mcilroy Colleen

| No. | Name | Date of birth | Height | 2016 club |
|---|---|---|---|---|
| 1 | Emerson Tod | 7 August 1998 | 1.80 m (5 ft 11 in) | (New Zealand) Tauranga |
| 2 | Jordan Peipi | 10 December 1998 | 1.75 m (5 ft 9 in) | (New Zealand) Redbacks |
| 3 | Aria Koria (C) | 1 January 1998 | 1.80 m (5 ft 11 in) | (New Zealand) Scopions |
| 4 | Kristina Emson | 29 January 1998 | 1.78 m (5 ft 10 in) | (New Zealand) Hamilton |
| 5 | Natasha Bannister | 24 February 1999 | 1.79 m (5 ft 10 in) | (New Zealand) Redbacks |
| 6 | Talia Davies | 5 December 1998 | 1.80 m (5 ft 11 in) | (New Zealand) Hamilton |
| 7 | Teina Rihari | 25 July 1998 | 1.80 m (5 ft 11 in) | (New Zealand) Northland Kauri |
| 8 | Emma Mabbott | 26 December 1999 | 1.83 m (6 ft 0 in) | (New Zealand) Tauranga |
| 9 | Ellena Taiseni | 9 May 1999 | 1.76 m (5 ft 9 in) | (New Zealand) Sparta |
| 10 | Georgia Park | 4 March 1998 | 1.71 m (5 ft 7 in) | (New Zealand) Harbour Raiders |
| 11 | Jesse Te Rito | 24 November 1999 | 1.74 m (5 ft 9 in) | (New Zealand) Harbour Raiders |
| 12 | Jodi Stevens | 15 August 1999 | 1.83 m (6 ft 0 in) | (New Zealand) Tauranga |

== Pool C ==
=== Japan ===
The following is the Japanese roster in the 2016 Asian Junior Championship.

Head Coach: Abo Kiyoshi

| No. | Name | Date of birth | Height | Weight | Spike | Block | 2016 club |
|---|---|---|---|---|---|---|---|
| 1 | Ai Kurogo | 14 June 1998 | 1.80 m (5 ft 11 in) | 70 kg (150 lb) | 302 cm (119 in) | 290 cm (110 in) | (Japan) Shimokitazawa Seitoku H.S. |
| 2 | Haruka Sekiyama | 21 December 1998 | 1.75 m (5 ft 9 in) | 73 kg (161 lb) | 292 cm (115 in) | 284 cm (112 in) | (Japan) Hachioji Jissen HS |
| 3 | Tamaki Matsui (C) | 10 January 1998 | 1.70 m (5 ft 7 in) | 63 kg (139 lb) | 280 cm (110 in) | 265 cm (104 in) | Japan College HS |
| 4 | Fuyumi Hawi Okumu | 27 June 1998 | 1.77 m (5 ft 10 in) | 76 kg (168 lb) | 310 cm (120 in) | 295 cm (116 in) | (Japan) Hakata HS |
| 5 | Sho Arai | 30 June 1998 | 1.73 m (5 ft 8 in) | 62 kg (137 lb) | 289 cm (114 in) | 275 cm (108 in) | (Japan) Shujitsu HS |
| 6 | Shuri Yamaguchi | 2 September 1998 | 1.75 m (5 ft 9 in) | 69 kg (152 lb) | 292 cm (115 in) | 280 cm (110 in) | (Japan) Shimokitazawa Seitoku HS |
| 7 | Shiori Aratani | 22 September 1998 | 1.73 m (5 ft 8 in) | 60 kg (130 lb) | 295 cm (116 in) | 290 cm (110 in) | (Japan) Kyoei Gakuen Senior HS |
| 8 | Miyuki Horie | 12 October 1998 | 1.73 m (5 ft 8 in) | 62 kg (137 lb) | 293 cm (115 in) | 280 cm (110 in) | (Japan) Shimokitazawa Seitoku HS |
| 10 | Yukako Yasui | 8 January 1999 | 1.65 m (5 ft 5 in) | 62 kg (137 lb) | 265 cm (104 in) | 256 cm (101 in) | (Japan) Hinomoto Gakuen HS |
| 11 | Reina Tokoku | 28 April 1999 | 1.76 m (5 ft 9 in) | 65 kg (143 lb) | 303 cm (119 in) | 287 cm (113 in) | (Japan) Hachioji Jissen HS |
| 12 | Nanami Seki | 12 June 1999 | 1.71 m (5 ft 7 in) | 58 kg (128 lb) | 282 cm (111 in) | 275 cm (108 in) | (Japan) Kashiwai HS |
| 15 | Ruriko Uesaka | 7 September 1999 | 1.73 m (5 ft 8 in) | 65 kg (143 lb) | 287 cm (113 in) | 280 cm (110 in) | (Japan) Fukui Senior HS |

=== India ===
The following is the Indian roster in the 2016 Asian Junior Championship.

Head Coach: Jangra Ajay

| No. | Name | Date of birth | Height | Weight | Spike | Block | 2016 club |
|---|---|---|---|---|---|---|---|
| 1 | Sivan Aleena | 5 February 1999 | 1.56 m (5 ft 1 in) | 49 kg (108 lb) | 261 cm (103 in) | 253 cm (100 in) | India |
| 2 | Meramanbhai Chetna | 1 February 1998 | 1.71 m (5 ft 7 in) | 60 kg (130 lb) | 270 cm (110 in) | 265 cm (104 in) | India |
| 3 | Roy Ishita | 11 December 1999 | 1.83 m (6 ft 0 in) | 73 kg (161 lb) | 274 cm (108 in) | 267 cm (105 in) | India |
| 5 | Vinod Gowwri | 14 March 1998 | 1.81 m (5 ft 11 in) | 65 kg (143 lb) | 283 cm (111 in) | 274 cm (108 in) | India |
| 8 | Rai Ananya | 21 July 1998 | 1.79 m (5 ft 10 in) | 74 kg (163 lb) | 270 cm (110 in) | 264 cm (104 in) | India |
| 9 | Kour Sukhveet | 20 July 1999 | 1.78 m (5 ft 10 in) | 65 kg (143 lb) | 272 cm (107 in) | 264 cm (104 in) | India |
| 10 | Fernandes Stancy | 22 February 1998 | 1.74 m (5 ft 9 in) | 67 kg (148 lb) | 272 cm (107 in) | 265 cm (104 in) | India |
| 11 | Thomas Maya | 23 June 1998 | 1.84 m (6 ft 0 in) | 59 kg (130 lb) | 278 cm (109 in) | 268 cm (106 in) | India |
| 13 | Varjangbhai Kinjalben | 26 June 1998 | 1.61 m (5 ft 3 in) | 52 kg (115 lb) | 267 cm (105 in) | 253 cm (100 in) | India |
| 16 | Soorja | 16 December 1998 | 1.88 m (6 ft 2 in) | 58 kg (128 lb) | 296 cm (117 in) | 291 cm (115 in) | India |
| 17 | Shivani (C) | 15 April 1998 | 1.82 m (6 ft 0 in) | 54 kg (119 lb) | 279 cm (110 in) | 272 cm (107 in) | India |
| 18 | Priya Anu | 30 June 1999 | 1.70 m (5 ft 7 in) | 61 kg (134 lb) | 269 cm (106 in) | 260 cm (100 in) | India |

=== Macau ===
The following is the Macau roster in the 2016 Asian Junior Championship.

Head Coach: Leung Ka Ka

| No. | Name | Date of birth | Height | Weight | Spike | Block | 2016 club |
|---|---|---|---|---|---|---|---|
| 2 | Chong Ian In | 12 May 1999 | 1.55 m (5 ft 1 in) | 48 kg (106 lb) | 230 cm (91 in) | 228 cm (90 in) | (Macau) Leng Fung |
| 3 | Lei Keng Lai | 24 May 2000 | 1.70 m (5 ft 7 in) | 48 kg (106 lb) | 240 cm (94 in) | 235 cm (93 in) | (Macau) Pui Cheng |
| 5 | Wong Chi Man | 5 June 1999 | 1.66 m (5 ft 5 in) | 56 kg (123 lb) | 261 cm (103 in) | 250 cm (98 in) | (Macau) LCTP |
| 8 | Wu Teng Chi | 25 June 1998 | 1.82 m (6 ft 0 in) | 72 kg (159 lb) | 272 cm (107 in) | 268 cm (106 in) | (Macau) Pui Cheng |
| 9 | Wong Weng U (L) | 13 September 1998 | 1.58 m (5 ft 2 in) | 50 kg (110 lb) | 230 cm (91 in) | 228 cm (90 in) | (Macau) Pui Cheng |
| 10 | Sun Iok Lam (L) | 3 December 1998 | 1.61 m (5 ft 3 in) | 57 kg (126 lb) | 230 cm (91 in) | 228 cm (90 in) | (Macau) Leng Fung |
| 11 | Cheang Hei Io | 28 April 1999 | 1.66 m (5 ft 5 in) | 46 kg (101 lb) | 260 cm (100 in) | 254 cm (100 in) | (Macau) Pui Cheng |
| 12 | Leong Pou Lam | 11 April 1998 | 1.61 m (5 ft 3 in) | 48 kg (106 lb) | 261 cm (103 in) | 247 cm (97 in) | (Macau) Pui Cheng |
| 13 | Law Weng Sam | 13 February 1998 | 1.71 m (5 ft 7 in) | 55 kg (121 lb) | 282 cm (111 in) | 278 cm (109 in) | (Macau) Hong Nam |
| 16 | Vu Ut Mio (C) | 1 December 1999 | 1.67 m (5 ft 6 in) | 55 kg (121 lb) | 278 cm (109 in) | 275 cm (108 in) | (Macau) Chong Shun |
| 17 | Lei I Kei | 23 December 2000 | 1.75 m (5 ft 9 in) | 50 kg (110 lb) | 275 cm (108 in) | 270 cm (110 in) | (Macau) Pui Cheng |
| 18 | Tin Nok Ian | 7 April 1999 | 1.63 m (5 ft 4 in) | 55 kg (121 lb) | 233 cm (92 in) | 230 cm (91 in) | (Macau) Pui Cheng |

=== Iran ===
The following is the Iranian roster in the 2016 Asian Junior Championship.

Head Coach: Fariba Sadeghi

| No. | Name | Date of birth | Height | Weight | Spike | Block | 2016 club |
|---|---|---|---|---|---|---|---|
| 2 | Masoumeh Esmaeili | 26 July 1999 | 1.78 m (5 ft 10 in) | 62 kg (137 lb) | 262 cm (103 in) | 255 cm (100 in) | |
| 4 | Mona Ashofteh | 1 February 2001 | 1.82 m (6 ft 0 in) | 63 kg (139 lb) | 274 cm (108 in) | 267 cm (105 in) | |
| 5 | Sogand Haghparast | 25 March 1998 | 1.86 m (6 ft 1 in) | 72 kg (159 lb) | 296 cm (117 in) | 290 cm (110 in) | |
| 6 | Hananeh Karami | 30 September 1999 | 1.75 m (5 ft 9 in) | 59 kg (130 lb) | 267 cm (105 in) | 257 cm (101 in) | |
| 8 | Sara Nazari (L) | 8 November 1998 | 1.76 m (5 ft 9 in) | 60 kg (130 lb) | 258 cm (102 in) | 248 cm (98 in) | |
| 11 | Zahra Bolaghi | 31 March 1998 | 1.74 m (5 ft 9 in) | 75 kg (165 lb) | 262 cm (103 in) | 251 cm (99 in) | |
| 12 | Fatemeh Solgi | 2 January 1998 | 1.94 m (6 ft 4 in) | 92 kg (203 lb) | 287 cm (113 in) | 280 cm (110 in) | |
| 13 | Negin Shirtari (C) | 3 March 1998 | 1.86 m (6 ft 1 in) | 81 kg (179 lb) | 270 cm (110 in) | 262 cm (103 in) | |
| 14 | Maedeh Mohammadi | 2 October 1999 | 1.80 m (5 ft 11 in) | 57 kg (126 lb) | 272 cm (107 in) | 262 cm (103 in) | |
| 15 | Aytak Salamat | 3 December 2000 | 1.87 m (6 ft 2 in) | 85 kg (187 lb) | 278 cm (109 in) | 265 cm (104 in) | |
| 17 | Fatemeh Enayat Fini | 2 September 2000 | 1.80 m (5 ft 11 in) | 84 kg (185 lb) | 270 cm (110 in) | 262 cm (103 in) | |
| 18 | Sogand Salim | 13 January 1998 | 1.83 m (6 ft 0 in) | 74 kg (163 lb) | 274 cm (108 in) | 262 cm (103 in) | |

== Pool D ==
=== South Korea ===
The following is the Korean roster in the 2016 Asian Junior Championship.

Head coach: Park Giju

| No. | Name | Date of birth | Height | Weight | Spike | Block | 2016 club |
|---|---|---|---|---|---|---|---|
| 2 | Lee Miae | 7 March 1998 | 1.72 m (5 ft 8 in) | 74 kg (163 lb) | 285 cm (112 in) | 275 cm (108 in) | (South Korea) Gangneung HS |
| 3 | An Hyejin | 16 February 1998 | 1.75 m (5 ft 9 in) | 60 kg (130 lb) | 290 cm (110 in) | 280 cm (110 in) | (South Korea) Gangneung HS |
| 4 | Kim Juhyang | 27 March 1999 | 1.82 m (6 ft 0 in) | 59 kg (130 lb) | 283 cm (111 in) | 274 cm (108 in) | (South Korea) Gwangju PE HS |
| 8 | Han Sujin | 2 July 1999 | 1.68 m (5 ft 6 in) | 60 kg (130 lb) | 290 cm (110 in) | 280 cm (110 in) | (South Korea) Sumon Computer Science HS |
| 10 | Ko Minji | 27 April 1998 | 1.72 m (5 ft 8 in) | 60 kg (130 lb) | 283 cm (111 in) | 277 cm (109 in) | (South Korea) Daegu HS |
| 11 | Choi Yuni | 18 February 1999 | 1.82 m (6 ft 0 in) | 66 kg (146 lb) | 300 cm (120 in) | 290 cm (110 in) | (South Korea) Sumon Computer Science HS |
| 13 | Jung Hoyoung | 23 August 2001 | 1.89 m (6 ft 2 in) | 73 kg (161 lb) | 300 cm (120 in) | 280 cm (110 in) | (South Korea) Gwangju PE HS |
| 14 | Ji Minkyeong (C) | 16 March 1998 | 1.84 m (6 ft 0 in) | 72 kg (159 lb) | 300 cm (120 in) | 280 cm (110 in) | (South Korea) Sunmyung HS |
| 15 | Lee Seonjeong | 5 February 1998 | 1.82 m (6 ft 0 in) | 73 kg (161 lb) | 290 cm (110 in) | 280 cm (110 in) | (South Korea) Sunmyung HS |
| 16 | Park Eun-jin | 15 December 1999 | 1.87 m (6 ft 2 in) | 71 kg (157 lb) | 300 cm (120 in) | 285 cm (112 in) | (South Korea) Sehwa HS |
| 18 | Yoo Seoyeun | 12 January 1999 | 1.75 m (5 ft 9 in) | 62 kg (137 lb) | 285 cm (112 in) | 276 cm (109 in) | (South Korea) Sunmyung HS |
| 19 | Ha Hyorim | 16 April 1998 | 1.71 m (5 ft 7 in) | 62 kg (137 lb) | 279 cm (110 in) | 271 cm (107 in) | (South Korea) Wongok HS |

=== Chinese Taipei ===
The following is the Taiwanese roster in the 2016 Asian Junior Championship.

Head Coach: Lo Chung Jen

| No. | Name | Date of birth | Height | Weight | Spike | Block | 2016 club |
|---|---|---|---|---|---|---|---|
| 1 | Chen Tzu Yun | 9 April 1999 | 1.69 m (5 ft 7 in) | 61 kg (134 lb) | 285 cm (112 in) | 276 cm (109 in) | Chinese Taipei |
| 3 | Huang Ching Hsuan | 16 November 1998 | 1.80 m (5 ft 11 in) | 64 kg (141 lb) | 305 cm (120 in) | 300 cm (120 in) | Chinese Taipei |
| 6 | Chang Jia Ling | 29 September 1999 | 1.77 m (5 ft 10 in) | 73 kg (161 lb) | 300 cm (120 in) | 292 cm (115 in) | Chinese Taipei |
| 8 | Liao Ying Chun | 28 January 1999 | 1.74 m (5 ft 9 in) | 59 kg (130 lb) | 288 cm (113 in) | 281 cm (111 in) | Chinese Taipei |
| 9 | Chen Jia Man | 27 July 1999 | 1.67 m (5 ft 6 in) | 57 kg (126 lb) | 273 cm (107 in) | 270 cm (110 in) | Chinese Taipei |
| 10 | Chen Yu Chieh | 12 November 2000 | 1.72 m (5 ft 8 in) | 55 kg (121 lb) | 295 cm (116 in) | 288 cm (113 in) | Chinese Taipei |
| 11 | Chiu Ya Hui (C) | 4 April 1998 | 1.80 m (5 ft 11 in) | 64 kg (141 lb) | 300 cm (120 in) | 290 cm (110 in) | Chinese Taipei |
| 12 | Tsai Qin Yao | 20 September 1998 | 1.76 m (5 ft 9 in) | 71 kg (157 lb) | 290 cm (110 in) | 283 cm (111 in) | Chinese Taipei |
| 13 | Liu Kuei Ling | 28 January 1998 | 1.60 m (5 ft 3 in) | 56 kg (123 lb) | 275 cm (108 in) | 268 cm (106 in) | Chinese Taipei |
| 14 | Huang Man Ya | 10 October 1999 | 1.78 m (5 ft 10 in) | 56 kg (123 lb) | 191 cm (75 in) | 185 cm (73 in) | Chinese Taipei |
| 15 | Wang Yu Han | 3 September 2000 | 1.76 m (5 ft 9 in) | 66 kg (146 lb) | 292 cm (115 in) | 285 cm (112 in) | Chinese Taipei |
| 17 | Huang Cheng Yu | 25 February 1998 | 1.75 m (5 ft 9 in) | 56 kg (123 lb) | 300 cm (120 in) | 290 cm (110 in) | Chinese Taipei |

=== Australia ===
The following is the Australian roster in the 2016 Asian Junior Championship.

Head Coach: Pham Nam Viet

| No. | Name | Date of birth | Height | 2016 club |
|---|---|---|---|---|
| 1 | Mikayla Adam (C) | 23 November 1998 | 1.74 m (5 ft 9 in) | Australia |
| 4 | Katie Gardner | 1 October 1998 | 1.81 m (5 ft 11 in) | Australia |
| 5 | Karrie Van Rensburg | 20 November 1999 | 1.68 m (5 ft 6 in) | Australia |
| 9 | Holly Mallet | 10 February 1998 | 1.79 m (5 ft 10 in) | Australia |
| 10 | Yasmin Tan | 24 May 1998 | 1.81 m (5 ft 11 in) | Australia |
| 11 | Brooke Freckleton | 7 February 1999 | 1.86 m (6 ft 1 in) | Australia |
| 12 | Mikaela Stevens | 11 July 1998 | 1.79 m (5 ft 10 in) | Australia |
| 14 | Tara Maland | 20 May 1999 | 1.86 m (6 ft 1 in) | Australia |
| 16 | Courtney Durston | 27 August 1998 | 1.83 m (6 ft 0 in) | Australia |
| 17 | Kateia Barenaba | 25 January 1999 | 1.84 m (6 ft 0 in) | Australia |
| 18 | Kylee White | 2 April 1998 | 1.82 m (6 ft 0 in) | Australia |
| 19 | Jamie Clayden | 18 May 1998 | 1.77 m (5 ft 10 in) | Australia |

=== Philippines ===
The following is the Filipino roster in the 2016 Asian Junior Championship.

Head Coach: Francis John Vicente

| No. | Name | Date of birth | Height | Weight | Spike | Block | 2016 club |
|---|---|---|---|---|---|---|---|
| 1 | Isabelle Camama | 9 June 1998 | 1.77 m (5 ft 10 in) | 70 kg (150 lb) | 263 cm (104 in) | 264 cm (104 in) | (Philippines) University of the East |
| 2 | Jeanette Virginia Villareal | 21 July 1998 | 1.75 m (5 ft 9 in) | 59 kg (130 lb) | 260 cm (100 in) | 262 cm (103 in) | (Philippines) Far Eastern University |
| 3 | Mary Anne Mendrez | 14 November 1998 | 1.75 m (5 ft 9 in) | 59 kg (130 lb) | 260 cm (100 in) | 261 cm (103 in) | (Philippines) University of the East |
| 4 | Kath Arado (L) | 22 May 1998 | 1.57 m (5 ft 2 in) | 50 kg (110 lb) | 240 cm (94 in) | 240 cm (94 in) | (Philippines) University of the East |
| 6 | Seth Marione Rodriguez | 22 September 1998 | 1.77 m (5 ft 10 in) | 62 kg (137 lb) | 261 cm (103 in) | 262 cm (103 in) | (Philippines) University of the East |
| 7 | Dianne Latayan | 21 April 1998 | 1.70 m (5 ft 7 in) | 59 kg (130 lb) | 259 cm (102 in) | 260 cm (100 in) | (Philippines) Mapua Institute of Technology |
| 8 | Rica Diolan (C) | 15 August 1998 | 1.67 m (5 ft 6 in) | 55 kg (121 lb) | 254 cm (100 in) | 253 cm (100 in) | (Philippines) De La Salle - College of Saint Benilde |
| 9 | Jasmine Nabor | 11 July 1998 | 1.70 m (5 ft 7 in) | 50 kg (110 lb) | 262 cm (103 in) | 264 cm (104 in) | (Philippines) National University |
| 10 | Mariella Gabarda | 13 June 1998 | 1.75 m (5 ft 9 in) | 48 kg (106 lb) | 262 cm (103 in) | 265 cm (104 in) | (Philippines) University of the East |
| 12 | Ria Beatriz Glenell Duremdes | 7 June 1998 | 1.57 m (5 ft 2 in) | 47 kg (104 lb) | 238 cm (94 in) | 237 cm (93 in) | (Philippines) Far Eastern University |
| 13 | Trisha Mae Genesis | 20 March 2000 | 1.70 m (5 ft 7 in) | 55 kg (121 lb) | 260 cm (100 in) | 262 cm (103 in) | (Philippines) Holy Rosary College |
| 14 | Zilfa Olarve | 2 March 1998 | 1.72 m (5 ft 8 in) | 65 kg (143 lb) | 263 cm (104 in) | 264 cm (104 in) | (Philippines) Holy Rosary College |
