= 2018 Asian Women's U19 Volleyball Championship =

Tournament details
- Host country: Vietnam
- Dates: 10–17 June
- Teams: 15 (from 1 confederation)
- Venues: 2 (in 2 host cities)

Final positions
- Champions: Japan (6th title)

Tournament awards
- MVP: (Japan) Kanon Sonoda

The 2018 Asian Women's U19 Volleyball Championship, referred to as the 2018 SMM Asian Women's U19 Volleyball Championship for sponsorship reasons, was the nineteenth edition of the Asian Women's U19 Volleyball Championship, a biennial international volleyball tournament organised by the Asian Volleyball Confederation (AVC) with Volleyball Federation of Vietnam (VFV) for the women's under-19 national teams of Asia. The tournament was held in Bắc Ninh Province, Vietnam, from 10 to 17 June 2018.

A total of fifteen teams played in the tournament, with players born on or after 1 January 2000 eligible to participate.

Same as previous editions, the tournament acted as the AVC qualifiers for the FIVB Volleyball Women's U20 World Championship. The top two teams qualified for the 2019 FIVB Volleyball Women's U20 World Championship, as the AVC representatives.

== Qualification ==
The fifteen AVC member associations will participate in the tournament (included the India, who was suspended by the FIVB and was lifted the suspension in May 2018), Vietnam qualified as host country. There are thirteen teams participated in the 2016 Asian Women's U19 Volleyball Championship, and the one remaining teams did not participate in the previous edition. The fifteen AVC member associations were from four zonal associations, including, Central Asia (4 teams), East Asia (6 teams), Oceania (2 team) and Southeast Asia (3 teams). While any West Asian teams did not participate this edition and Uzbekistan withdrew from the tournament.

=== Qualified teams ===
The following teams qualified for the tournament.

Means of qualification	Births	Qualified
Host country	1	Vietnam
Central Asian teams	4	India
Central Asian teams	4	Iran
Central Asian teams	4	Kazakhstan
Central Asian teams	4	Sri Lanka
Central Asian teams	4	Uzbekistan
East Asian teams	6	China
East Asian teams	6	Chinese Taipei
East Asian teams	6	Hong Kong
East Asian teams	6	Japan
East Asian teams	6	Macau
East Asian teams	6	South Korea
Oceanian teams	2	Australia
Oceanian teams	2	New Zealand
Southeast Asian team	2	Malaysia
Southeast Asian team	2	Thailand
Total 15

== Pools composition ==
This is the first Asian Women's U19 Volleyball Championship which will use the new competition format. Following the 2017 AVC Board of Administration’s unanimous decision, the new format will see teams being drawn into four pools up to the total amount of the participating teams. Each team as well as the host side will be assigned into a pool according to their 2016 ranking. The four best-ranked teams will be drawn in the same Pool A, the next best four will contest Pool B, the next best four will contest Pool C. Pool D will comprise teams finishing next best three teams.

Pool A	Pool B	Pool C	Pool D
China (1)	South Korea (5)	Iran (9)	New Zealand (14)
Japan (2)	Chinese Taipei (6)	Australia (11)	Sri Lanka (15)
Thailand (3)	Kazakhstan (7)	Macau (12)	Uzbekistan (–)
Vietnam (4; Host)	India (8)	Hong Kong (13)	Malaysia (–)

== Venues ==
Code	Venue	Capacity	Location
BNG	Bac Ninh Gymnasium	4,000	Bắc Ninh City
UPS	Bac Ninh University of Physical Education and Sports	1,000	Từ Sơn

== Preliminary round ==
- All times are Indochina Time (UTC+07:00)

=== Pool standing procedure ===
1. Number of matches won
2. Match points
3. Sets ratio
4. Points ratio
5. Result of the last match between the tied teams

Match won 3–0 or 3–1: 3 match points for the winner, 0 match points for the loser
Match won 3–2: 2 match points for the winner, 1 match point for the loser
Match forfeited: 0 match points for each.

=== Pool A ===
Pos	Team	Pld	W	L	Pts	SW	SL	SR	SPW	SPL	SPR	Qualification
1	Japan	3	3	0	9	9	0	MAX	225	158	1.424	Quarter-finals
2	Thailand	3	2	1	5	6	6	1.000	264	264	1.000	Round of 15
3	China	3	1	2	4	5	7	0.714	255	255	1.000	Round of 15
4	Vietnam (H)	3	0	3	0	2	9	0.222	207	274	0.755	Round of 15

Updated to match(es) played on unknown. Source:
Rules for classification: Pool standing procedure
(H) Host

Date	Time	Venue		Score		Set 1	Set 2	Set 3	Set 4	Set 5	Total	Report
10 June	15:00	BNG	China	0–3	Japan	16–25	22–25	13–25			51–75	
10 June	20:30	BNG	Vietnam	1–3	Thailand	26–24	21–25	17–25	21–25		85–99	
11 June	15:00	BNG	Japan	3–0	Thailand	25–22	25–19	25–21			75–62	
11 June	20:00	BNG	Vietnam	1–3	China	17–25	25–22	26–28	9–25		77–100	
12 June	15:00	BNG	China	2–3	Thailand	25–13	20–25	27–25	22–25	10–15	104–103	
12 June	20:00	BNG	Vietnam	0–3	Japan	12–25	12–25	21–25			45–75	

=== Pool B ===
Pos	Team	Pld	W	L	Pts	SW	SL	SR	SPW	SPL	SPR	Qualification
1	Chinese Taipei	3	3	0	8	9	2	4.500	252	212	1.189	Round of 15
2	South Korea	3	2	1	6	8	5	1.600	254	249	1.020	Round of 15
3	Kazakhstan	3	1	2	4	5	6	0.833	228	246	0.927	Round of 15
4	India	3	0	3	0	0	9	0.000	125	152	0.822	Round of 15

Updated to match(es) played on unknown. Source:
Rules for classification: Pool standing procedure

Date	Time	Venue		Score		Set 1	Set 2	Set 3	Set 4	Set 5	Total	Report
10 June	17:30	UPS	Kazakhstan	3–0	India	25–22	25–19	27–25			77–66	
10 June	17:30	BNG	South Korea	2–3	Chinese Taipei	17–25	17–25	25–22	25–15	13–15	97–102	
11 June	17:30	UPS	South Korea	3–0	India	25–17	25–14	25–21			75–52	
11 June	17:30	BNG	Chinese Taipei	3–0	Kazakhstan	25–16	25–17	25–23			75–56	
12 June	17:30	UPS	South Korea	3–2	Kazakhstan	23–25	17–25	25–20	25–14	15–6	105–90	
12 June	17:30	BNG	Chinese Taipei	3–0	India	25–17	25–21	25–13			75–51	

=== Pool C ===
Pos	Team	Pld	W	L	Pts	SW	SL	SR	SPW	SPL	SPR	Qualification
1	Iran	3	2	1	7	8	4	2.000	275	210	1.310	Round of 15
2	Australia	3	2	1	6	8	6	1.333	289	287	1.007	Round of 15
3	Hong Kong	3	2	1	5	7	5	1.400	255	236	1.081	Round of 15
4	Macau	3	0	3	0	1	6	0.167	157	243	0.646	Round of 15

Updated to match(es) played on unknown. Source:
Rules for classification: Pool standing procedure

Date	Time	Venue		Score		Set 1	Set 2	Set 3	Set 4	Set 5	Total	Report
10 June	12:30	UPS	Australia	3–1	Macau	25–19	18–25	25–18	25–13		93–75	
10 June	12:30	BNG	Iran	3–1	Hong Kong	19–25	25–13	25–18	25–18		94–74	
11 June	12:30	UPS	Macau	0–3	Hong Kong	14–25	14–25	13–25			41–75	
11 June	12:30	BNG	Iran	2–3	Australia	25–15	25–15	23–25	21–25	12–15	106–95	
12 June	12:30	UPS	Australia	2–3	Hong Kong	25–17	25–27	25–22	18–25	8–15	101–106	
12 June	12:30	BNG	Iran	3–0	Macau	25–11	25–18	25–12			75–41	

=== Pool D ===
Pos	Team	Pld	W	L	Pts	SW	SL	SR	SPW	SPL	SPR	Qualification
1	New Zealand	2	2	0	5	6	3	2.000	200	193	1.036	Round of 15
2	Malaysia	2	1	1	4	5	3	1.667	183	164	1.116	Round of 15
3	Sri Lanka	2	0	2	0	1	6	0.167	147	173	0.850	Round of 15
4	Uzbekistan	0	0	0	0	0	0	—	0	0	—	Withdrawn

Updated to match(es) played on unknown. Source:
Rules for classification: Pool standing procedure

Date	Time	Venue		Score		Set 1	Set 2	Set 3	Set 4	Set 5	Total	Report
10 June	15:00	UPS	New Zealand	3–2	Malaysia	16–25	20–25	25–22	25–22	16–14	102–108	
11 June	15:00	UPS	New Zealand	3–1	Sri Lanka	25–19	23–25	25–21	25–20		98–85	
12 June	15:00	UPS	Sri Lanka	0–3	Malaysia	16–25	23–25	23–25			62–75	

== Bracket composition ==
Pool A		Pool B		Pool C		Pool D	
1	Japan	1	Chinese Taipei	1	Iran	1	New Zealand
2	Thailand	2	South Korea	2	Australia	2	Malaysia
3	China	3	Kazakhstan	3	Hong Kong	3	Sri Lanka
4	Vietnam	4	India	4	Macau	#	—N/a

== Final round ==
=== Classification round (R9–15) ===
==== Classification round (R13–15) ====
13th–15th places
16 June
Sri Lanka	0
Malaysia	3

13th place
17 June
Macau	0
Malaysia	3

==== Thirteenth to Fifteenth places ====
- Winners will advance to Thirteenth places play-off.
- Loser will finish at Fifteenth place.

Date	Time	Venue		Score		Set 1	Set 2	Set 3	Set 4	Set 5	Total	Report
16 June	15:00	UPS	Sri Lanka	0–3	Malaysia	18–25	9–25	22–25			49–75	

==== Thirteenth place ====
Date	Time	Venue		Score		Set 1	Set 2	Set 3	Set 4	Set 5	Total	Report
17 June	12:30	UPS	Macau	0–3	Malaysia	21–25	24–26	11–25			56–76	

==== Classification round (R9–15) ====
9th–15th places
15 June
New Zealand	3
Macau	0
15 June
Sri Lanka	0
Australia	3
15 June
Malaysia	0
Hong Kong	3

9th–12th places
16 June
India	2
New Zealand	3
16 June
Australia	3
Hong Kong	2

9th place
17 June
New Zealand	3
Australia	0
11th place
17 June
India	3
Hong Kong	2

==== Ninth to Fifteenth places ====
- Winners will advance to Ninth to Twelfth place
- Losers will transfer to Classification round (R13–15).

Date	Time	Venue		Score		Set 1	Set 2	Set 3	Set 4	Set 5	Total	Report
15 June	12:30	UPS	Australia	3–0	Sri Lanka	25–11	25–12	25–18			75–41	
15 June	15:00	UPS	Macau	0–3	New Zealand	15–25	15–25	21–25			51–75	
15 June	17:30	UPS	Hong Kong	3–0	Malaysia	25–16	25–20	25–21			75–57	

==== Ninth to Twelfth places ====
- Winners will advance to Ninth places play-off.
- Losers will be given a chance to Eleventh places play-off.

Date	Time	Venue		Score		Set 1	Set 2	Set 3	Set 4	Set 5	Total	Report
16 June	17:30	UPS	India	2–3	New Zealand	25–17	24–26	25–22	28–30	12–15	114–110	
16 June	20:00	UPS	Australia	3–2	Hong Kong	22–25	23–25	25–16	25–18	15–13	110–97	

==== Eleventh place ====
Date	Time	Venue		Score		Set 1	Set 2	Set 3	Set 4	Set 5	Total	Report
17 June	15:00	UPS	India	3–2	Hong Kong	16–25	22–25	25–19	25–17	15–6	103–92	

==== Ninth place ====
Date	Time	Venue		Score		Set 1	Set 2	Set 3	Set 4	Set 5	Total	Report
17 June	17:30	UPS	New Zealand	3–0	Australia	25–15	25–18	25–19			75–52	

=== Classification round (R5–8) ===
5th–8th places
16 June
Iran	2
Vietnam	3
16 June
Kazakhstan	1
South Korea	3

5th place
17 June
Vietnam	0
South Korea	3
7th place
17 June
Iran	1
Kazakhstan	3

==== Fifth to Eight places ====
- Winners will advance to Fifth places play-off.
- Losers will be given a chance to Seventh places play-off.

Date	Time	Venue		Score		Set 1	Set 2	Set 3	Set 4	Set 5	Total	Report
16 June	12:30	BNG	South Korea	3–1	Kazakhstan	24–26	25–19	25–13	25–15		99–73	
16 June	15:00	BNG	Vietnam	3–2	Iran	19–25	25–14	25–18	18–25	15–13	102–95	

==== Seventh place ====
Date	Time	Venue		Score		Set 1	Set 2	Set 3	Set 4	Set 5	Total	Report
17 June	20:00	UPS	Kazakhstan	3–1	Iran	25–15	22–25	25–23	25–12		97–75	

==== Fifth place ====
Date	Time	Venue		Score		Set 1	Set 2	Set 3	Set 4	Set 5	Total	Report
17 June	15:00	BNG	Vietnam	0–3	South Korea	17–25	16–25	23–25			56–75	

=== Championship round (R1–15) ===
Round of 15
14 June
India	0
Iran	3
14 June
Vietnam	3
New Zealand	0
14 June
Chinese Taipei	3
Macau	0
14 June
Thailand	3
Sri Lanka	0
14 June
Kazakhstan	3
Australia	1
14 June
China	3
Malaysia	0
14 June
South Korea	3
Hong Kong	0

Quarter-finals
15 June
Japan	3
Iran	0
15 June
Vietnam	1
Chinese Taipei	3
15 June
Thailand	3
Kazakhstan	0
15 June
China	3
South Korea	0

Semi-finals
16 June
Japan	3
Chinese Taipei	0
16 June
Thailand	2
China	3

Final
17 June
Japan	3
China	0
Third place
17 June
Thailand	3
Chinese Taipei	1

==== Round of 15 ====
- Winners will advance to Quarter-finals.
- Losers will transfer to Classification round (R9–15).

Date	Time	Venue		Score		Set 1	Set 2	Set 3	Set 4	Set 5	Total	Report
14 June	12:30	UPS	Kazakhstan	3–1	Australia	25–21	25–18	20–25	25–16		95–80	
14 June	12:30	BNG	China	3–0	Malaysia	25–7	25–16	25–13			75–36	
14 June	15:00	UPS	South Korea	3–0	Hong Kong	25–15	25–11	25–10			75–36	
14 June	15:00	BNG	Thailand	3–0	Sri Lanka	25–14	25–4	25–9			75–27	
14 June	17:30	UPS	India	0–3	Iran	17–25	19–25	12–25			48–75	
14 June	17:30	BNG	Chinese Taipei	3–0	Macau	25–11	25–12	25–12			75–35	
14 June	20:00	BNG	Vietnam	3–0	New Zealand	25–22	25–21	25–23			75–66	

==== Quarter-finals ====
- Winners will advance to Semi-finals.
- Losers will transfer to Classification round (R5–8).

Date	Time	Venue		Score		Set 1	Set 2	Set 3	Set 4	Set 5	Total	Report
15 June	15:00	BNG	Thailand	3–0	Kazakhstan	27–25	25–16	25–13			77–54	
15 June	17:30	BNG	China	3–0	South Korea	25–16	25–22	25–22			75–60	
15 June	20:00	UPS	Vietnam	1–3	Chinese Taipei	22–25	25–21	27–29	20–25		94–100	
15 June	20:00	BNG	Japan	3–0	Iran	25–14	25–15	25–6			75–35	

==== Semi-finals ====
- Winners will advance to Finals and World Championship.
- Losers will be given a chance to Third place play-off.

Date	Time	Venue		Score		Set 1	Set 2	Set 3	Set 4	Set 5	Total	Report
16 June	17:30	BNG	China	3–2	Thailand	25–16	25–19	12–25	17–25	15–7	94–92	
16 June	20:00	BNG	Japan	3–0	Chinese Taipei	25–10	25–14	25–19			75–43	

==== Third place ====
Date	Time	Venue		Score		Set 1	Set 2	Set 3	Set 4	Set 5	Total	Report
17 June	17:30	BNG	Thailand	3–1	Chinese Taipei	25–22	26–24	17–25	25–23		93–94	

==== Final ====
Date	Time	Venue		Score		Set 1	Set 2	Set 3	Set 4	Set 5	Total	Report
17 June	20:30	BNG	China	0–3	Japan	20–25	14–25	20–25			54–75	

== Final standing ==
Qualified for the 2019 FIVB U20 World Championship and 2021 FIVB U20 World Championship
Qualified for the 2021 FIVB U20 World Championship

Rank	Team
1st place, gold medalist(s)	Japan
2nd place, silver medalist(s)	China
3rd place, bronze medalist(s)	Thailand
4	Chinese Taipei
5	South Korea
6	Vietnam
7	Kazakhstan
8	Iran
9	New Zealand
10	Australia
11	India
12	Hong Kong
13	Malaysia
14	Macau
15	Sri Lanka

2018 Asian Women's U19 Volleyball champions

Japan
6th title

== Awards ==
- Most valuable player

(Japan) Kanon Sonoda

- Best outside spikers

(Thailand) Thanacha Sooksod
(Japan) Ayumi Yoshida

- Best setter

(Japan) Kanon Sonoda

- Best opposite spiker

(China) Xu Luyao

- Best middle blockers

(Chinese Taipei) Wen Yi-chin
(China) Jiao Dian

- Best libero

(Japan) Sayaka Daikuzono

== Broadcasting rights ==
Territory	Channel
AVC partner	SMMTV
Thailand
Thailand	Thairath TV
Vietnam
Vietnam	Thể Thao TV

== See also ==
- 2018 Asian Men's U20 Volleyball Championship
