= 2022 Asian Women's U20 Volleyball Championship =

Tournament details
- Host country: Kazakhstan
- Dates: 4–11 July
- Teams: 9 (from 1 confederation)
- Venue: 1 (in 1 host city)

Final positions
- Champions: Japan (7th title)
- Runners-up: China
- Third place: Thailand
- Fourth place: South Korea

Tournament awards
- MVP: (Japan) Anna Uemura

Tournament statistics
- Matches played: 24
- Attendance: 6,080 (253 per match)

The 2022 Asian Women's U20 Volleyball Championship, referred to as the 2022 SMM Asian Women's U20 Volleyball Championship for sponsorship reasons, was the twentieth edition of the Asian Women's U20 Volleyball Championship, a biennial international volleyball tournament organised by the Asian Volleyball Confederation (AVC) with Kazakhstan Volleyball Federation (KVF) for the women's under-20 national teams of Asia. The tournament was held in Nur-Sultan, Kazakhstan, from 4 to 11 July 2022.

A total of nine teams played in the tournament, with players born on or after 1 January 2003 eligible to participate.

Same as previous editions, the tournament acted as the AVC qualifiers for the FIVB Volleyball Women's U21 World Championship. The top two teams qualified for the 2023 FIVB Volleyball Women's U21 World Championship, as the AVC representatives.

== Qualification ==
The following teams qualified for the tournament.

Means of qualification	Births	Qualified
Host country	1	Kazakhstan
Central Asian teams	3	India
Central Asian teams	3	Iran
Central Asian teams	3	Uzbekistan
East Asian teams	4	China
East Asian teams	4	Chinese Taipei
East Asian teams	4	Japan
East Asian teams	4	South Korea
Oceanian teams	0	—N/a
Southeast Asian team	1	Thailand
Total 9

== Pools composition ==
Pool A	Pool B
Kazakhstan (Hosts)	Japan (1)
Thailand (3)	China (2)
South Korea (5)	Chinese Taipei (4)
Iran (8)	India (11)
—N/a	Uzbekistan (–)

== Preliminary round ==
=== Pool A ===
- All times are Kazakhstan Standard Time (UTC+06:00).

Pos	Team	Pld	W	L	Pts	SW	SL	SR	SPW	SPL	SPR	Qualification
1	South Korea	3	3	0	8	9	2	4.500	263	207	1.271	1st–4th place
2	Thailand	3	2	1	7	8	3	2.667	248	219	1.132	1st–4th place
3	Iran	3	1	2	3	3	6	0.500	183	210	0.871	5th–8th place
4	Kazakhstan (H)	3	0	3	0	0	9	0.000	166	225	0.738	5th–8th place

(H) Host

Date	Time		Score		Set 1	Set 2	Set 3	Set 4	Set 5	Total	Report
4 Jul	18:00	Iran	0–3	Thailand	23–25	15–25	15–25			53–75	P2
5 Jul	15:00	South Korea	3–2	Thailand	25–19	25–15	24–26	24–26	15–12	113–98	P2
5 Jul	17:30	Kazakhstan	0–3	Iran	20–25	19–25	21–25			60–75	P2
6 Jul	17:30	South Korea	3–0	Kazakhstan	25–14	25–20	25–20			75–54	P2
7 Jul	17:30	Thailand	3–0	Kazakhstan	25–13	25–22	25–18			75–53	P2
9 Jul	12:30	Iran	0–3	South Korea	20–25	14–25	21–25			55–75	P2

=== Pool B ===
Pos	Team	Pld	W	L	Pts	SW	SL	SR	SPW	SPL	SPR	Qualification
1	China	4	4	0	12	12	1	12.000	322	187	1.722	1st–4th place
2	Japan	4	3	1	9	9	3	3.000	282	213	1.324	1st–4th place
3	Chinese Taipei	4	2	2	6	7	6	1.167	277	239	1.159	5th–8th place
4	India	4	1	3	3	3	9	0.333	196	271	0.723	5th–8th place
5	Uzbekistan	4	0	4	0	0	12	0.000	133	300	0.443	9th place

Date	Time		Score		Set 1	Set 2	Set 3	Set 4	Set 5	Total	Report
4 Jul	12:30	China	3–0	Uzbekistan	25–6	25–9	25–4			75–19	P2
4 Jul	15:00	India	0–3	Chinese Taipei	11–25	12–25	15–25			38–75	P2
5 Jul	10:00	Japan	3–0	Chinese Taipei	25–19	25–22	25–15			75–56	P2
5 Jul	12:30	China	3–0	India	25–10	25–15	25–15			75–40	P2
6 Jul	12:30	Uzbekistan	0–3	India	21–25	11–25	14–25			46–75	P2
6 Jul	15:00	Japan	0–3	China	18–25	20–25	19–25			57–75	P2
7 Jul	12:30	Uzbekistan	0–3	Japan	9–25	11–25	19–25			39–75	P2
7 Jul	15:00	Chinese Taipei	1–3	China	14–25	25–22	12–25	20–25		71–97	P2
9 Jul	15:00	Chinese Taipei	3–0	Uzbekistan	25–8	25–7	25–14			75–29	P2
9 Jul	17:30	India	0–3	Japan	11–25	18–25	14–25			43–75	P2

== Final round ==
=== 5th–8th classification round ===
5th–8th semifinals
10 July – Nur-Sultan
Kazakhstan	0
Chinese Taipei	3
10 July – Nur-Sultan
India	1
Iran	3

5th place match
11 July – Nur-Sultan
Chinese Taipei	3
Iran	1
7th place match
11 July – Nur-Sultan
Kazakhstan	2
India	3

==== 5th–8th semifinals ====
Date	Time		Score		Set 1	Set 2	Set 3	Set 4	Set 5	Total	Report
10 Jul	10:00	India	1–3	Iran	20–25	25–21	15–25	25–27		85–98	P2
10 Jul	12:30	Chinese Taipei	3–0	Kazakhstan	25–17	25–13	25–22			75–52	P2

==== 7th place match ====
Date	Time		Score		Set 1	Set 2	Set 3	Set 4	Set 5	Total	Report
11 Jul	10:00	Kazakhstan	2–3	India	25–16	11–25	27–29	25–16	14–16	102–102	P2

==== 5th place match ====
Date	Time		Score		Set 1	Set 2	Set 3	Set 4	Set 5	Total	Report
11 Jul	12:30	Chinese Taipei	3–1	Iran	25–21	25–18	22–25	25–11		97–75	P2

=== Final four ===
Semifinals
10 July – Nur-Sultan
Japan	3
South Korea	0
10 July – Nur-Sultan
Thailand	0
China	3

Final
11 July – Nur-Sultan
Japan	3
China	0
3rd place match
11 July – Nur-Sultan
South Korea	2
Thailand	3

==== Semifinals ====
Date	Time		Score		Set 1	Set 2	Set 3	Set 4	Set 5	Total	Report
10 Jul	15:00	Japan	3–0	South Korea	25–18	25–19	25–11			75–48	P2
10 Jul	17:30	Thailand	0–3	China	23–25	17–25	15–25			55–75	P2

==== 3rd place match ====
Date	Time		Score		Set 1	Set 2	Set 3	Set 4	Set 5	Total	Report
11 Jul	15:00	South Korea	2–3	Thailand	23–25	25–12	24–26	25–20	14–16	111–99	P2

==== Final ====
Date	Time		Score		Set 1	Set 2	Set 3	Set 4	Set 5	Total	Report
11 Jul	17:30	Japan	3–0	China	25–16	25–21	25–22			75–59	P2

== Final standing ==
Rank	Team
1st place, gold medalist(s)	Japan
2nd place, silver medalist(s)	China
3rd place, bronze medalist(s)	Thailand
4	South Korea
5	Chinese Taipei
6	Iran
7	India
8	Kazakhstan
9	Uzbekistan

Qualified for the 2023 Women's U21 World Championship

2022 Asian Women's U20 champions

Japan
7th title

12–woman roster
Fukazawa Megumi, Fukazawa Tsugumi, Kaji Haruka, Saiki Amika, Yoshitake Mika, Tsutsumi Arina, Honda Rin, Kumgai Niina, Furukawa Airi, Tokumoto Amika, Uemura Anna, Kitamado Ayane
Head Coach: Akinori Yamada

== Awards ==
- Most valuable player
  (Japan) Anna Uemura
- Best setter
  (Japan) Kaji Haruka
- Best outside spikers
  (Japan) Anna Uemura
  (China) Wang Yifan
- Best middle blockers
  (China) Zhang Hongziyan
  (Thailand) Tunyapoo Nantikan
- Best opposite spiker
  (South Korea) Yang Youkyung
- Best libero
  (Japan) Amika Tokumoto

== See also ==
- 2022 Asian Girls' U18 Volleyball Championship
