= 2009 FIVB Volleyball Women's U20 World Championship =

2009 FIVB Women's Junior World Championship
Tournament details
- Host country: Mexico
- Dates: July 16–25
- Teams: 16
- Venues: 2 (in Tijuana and Mexicali host cities)

Final positions
- Champions: Germany (1st title)

Tournament awards
- MVP: Brenda Castillo (DOM)

The 2009 FIVB Women's Junior Volleyball World Championship was held in Tijuana and Mexicali, Mexico from July 16 to 25, 2009. 16 teams participated in the tournament.

== Qualification process ==
| Confederation | Method of Qualification | Date | Venue | Vacancies | Qualified |
|---|---|---|---|---|---|
| FIVB | Host | May 18, 2009 | | 1 | Mexico |
| NORCECA | 2008 NORCECA Junior Championship | August 22 – 27, 2008 | Saltillo, Mexico | 3 | United States; Dominican Republic; Cuba |
| CAVB | 2008 African Junior Championship | September 9 – 13, 2008 | (Kenya) Nairobi, Kenia | 1 | Kenya |
| AVC | 2008 Asian Junior Championship | September 20 – 28, 2008 | Taipei, Chinese Taipei | 3 | Chinese Taipei; China; Thailand |
| CSV | 2008 South American Junior Championship | October 1 – 5, 2008 | Chosica, Peru | 2 | Brazil; Venezuela |
| CEV | 2009 Women's Junior European Volleyball Championship Qualification | May 8 – 10, 2009 | Moscow, Russia | 6 | Netherlands |
| CEV | 2009 Women's Junior European Volleyball Championship Qualification | May 8 – 10, 2009 | Alania, Turkey | 6 | Turkey; Czech Republic* |
| CEV | 2009 Women's Junior European Volleyball Championship Qualification | May 8 – 10, 2009 | Gabrovo, Bulgaria | 6 | Bulgaria |
| CEV | 2009 Women's Junior European Volleyball Championship Qualification | May 8 – 10, 2009 | Sievierodonetsk, Ukraine | 6 | Germany |
| CEV | 2009 Women's Junior European Volleyball Championship Qualification | May 8 – 10, 2009 | Krosno, Poland | 6 | Poland |
| Total | | | | 16 | |

- Czech Republic qualified as the best second place of the 2009 Women's Junior European Volleyball Championship Qualification's groups.

== Pools composition ==
| Pool A in Mexicali | Pool B in Tijuana | Pool C in Mexicali | Pool D in Tijuana |
|---|---|---|---|
| Mexico; Netherlands; Venezuela; Thailand | China; Chinese Taipei; Czech Republic; Germany | Brazil; Dominican Republic; Kenya; Poland | Bulgaria; Cuba; Turkey; United States |

== First round ==
All times are Mexico's Pacific Time (UTC−07:00).

=== Pool A ===
| Pos | Team | Pld | W | L | Pts | SW | SL | SR | SPW | SPL | SPR | Qualification |
|---|---|---|---|---|---|---|---|---|---|---|---|---|
| 1 | Netherlands | 3 | 3 | 0 | 6 | 9 | 1 | 9.000 | 242 | 168 | 1.440 | Pool E or Pool F |
| 2 | Mexico | 3 | 2 | 1 | 5 | 7 | 6 | 1.167 | 277 | 269 | 1.030 | Pool E or Pool F |
| 3 | Venezuela | 3 | 1 | 2 | 4 | 4 | 6 | 0.667 | 183 | 226 | 0.810 | Pool G or Pool H |
| 4 | Thailand | 3 | 0 | 3 | 3 | 2 | 9 | 0.222 | 213 | 252 | 0.845 | Pool G or Pool H |

| Date | Time | | Score | | Set 1 | Set 2 | Set 3 | Set 4 | Set 5 | Total | Report |
|---|---|---|---|---|---|---|---|---|---|---|---|
| 16 July | 14:00 | Netherlands | 3–0 | Venezuela | 25–9 | 25–10 | 25–18 | | | 75–37 | P2 |
| 16 July | 21:30 | Mexico | 3–2 | Thailand | 25–23 | 14–25 | 25–17 | 20–25 | 18–16 | 102–106 | P2 |
| 17 July | 14:00 | Thailand | 0–3 | Netherlands | 17–25 | 21–25 | 9–25 | | | 47–75 | P2 |
| 17 July | 20:00 | Mexico | 3–1 | Venezuela | 25–11 | 16–25 | 25–22 | 25–13 | | 91–71 | P2 |
| 18 July | 14:00 | Venezuela | 3–0 | Thailand | 25–19 | 25–18 | 25–23 | | | 75–60 | P2 |
| 18 July | 20:53 | Mexico | 1–3 | Netherlands | 17–25 | 25–17 | 19–25 | 23–25 | | 84–92 | P2 |

=== Pool B ===
| Pos | Team | Pld | W | L | Pts | SW | SL | SR | SPW | SPL | SPR | Qualification |
|---|---|---|---|---|---|---|---|---|---|---|---|---|
| 1 | Germany | 3 | 3 | 0 | 6 | 9 | 0 | MAX | 225 | 150 | 1.500 | Pool E or Pool F |
| 2 | Chinese Taipei | 3 | 2 | 1 | 5 | 6 | 5 | 1.200 | 231 | 215 | 1.074 | Pool E or Pool F |
| 3 | China | 3 | 1 | 2 | 4 | 5 | 8 | 0.625 | 238 | 272 | 0.875 | Pool G or Pool H |
| 4 | Czech Republic | 3 | 0 | 3 | 3 | 2 | 9 | 0.222 | 201 | 258 | 0.779 | Pool G or Pool H |

| Date | Time | | Score | | Set 1 | Set 2 | Set 3 | Set 4 | Set 5 | Total | Report |
|---|---|---|---|---|---|---|---|---|---|---|---|
| 16 July | 14:00 | Chinese Taipei | 0–3 | Germany | 13–25 | 23–25 | 21–25 | | | 57–75 | P2 |
| 16 July | 18:08 | China | 3–2 | Czech Republic | 21–25 | 25–22 | 25–14 | 22–25 | 15–12 | 108–98 | P2 |
| 17 July | 16:00 | Germany | 3–0 | Czech Republic | 25–13 | 25–20 | 25–22 | | | 75–55 | P2 |
| 17 July | 20:00 | China | 2–3 | Chinese Taipei | 25–20 | 13–25 | 15–25 | 25–13 | 14–16 | 92–99 | P2 |
| 18 July | 14:00 | Czech Republic | 0–3 | Chinese Taipei | 20–25 | 10–25 | 18–25 | | | 48–75 | P2 |
| 18 July | 18:25 | Germany | 3–0 | China | 25–12 | 25–16 | 25–20 | | | 75–48 | P2 |

=== Pool C ===
| Pos | Team | Pld | W | L | Pts | SW | SL | SR | SPW | SPL | SPR | Qualification |
|---|---|---|---|---|---|---|---|---|---|---|---|---|
| 1 | Brazil | 3 | 3 | 0 | 6 | 9 | 3 | 3.000 | 272 | 200 | 1.360 | Pool E or Pool F |
| 2 | Dominican Republic | 3 | 2 | 1 | 5 | 8 | 3 | 2.667 | 256 | 185 | 1.384 | Pool E or Pool F |
| 3 | Poland | 3 | 1 | 2 | 4 | 4 | 6 | 0.667 | 207 | 197 | 1.051 | Pool G or Pool H |
| 4 | Kenya | 3 | 0 | 3 | 3 | 0 | 9 | 0.000 | 72 | 225 | 0.320 | Pool G or Pool H |

| Date | Time | | Score | | Set 1 | Set 2 | Set 3 | Set 4 | Set 5 | Total | Report |
|---|---|---|---|---|---|---|---|---|---|---|---|
| 16 July | 16:00 | Dominican Republic | 3–0 | Kenya | 25–11 | 25–10 | 25–6 | | | 75–27 | P2 |
| 16 July | 18:00 | Brazil | 3–1 | Poland | 25–16 | 22–25 | 25–13 | 25–20 | | 97–74 | P2 |
| 17 July | 16:00 | Brazil | 3–0 | Kenya | 25–2 | 25–10 | 25–8 | | | 75–20 | P2 |
| 17 July | 18:00 | Poland | 0–3 | Dominican Republic | 21–25 | 21–25 | 16–25 | | | 58–75 | P2 |
| 18 July | 16:00 | Kenya | 0–3 | Poland | 10–25 | 6–25 | 9–25 | | | 25–75 | P2 |
| 18 July | 18:00 | Brazil | 3–2 | Dominican Republic | 25–23 | 17–25 | 25–22 | 18–25 | 15–11 | 100–106 | P2 |

=== Pool D ===
| Pos | Team | Pld | W | L | Pts | SW | SL | SR | SPW | SPL | SPR | Qualification |
|---|---|---|---|---|---|---|---|---|---|---|---|---|
| 1 | Turkey | 3 | 3 | 0 | 6 | 9 | 1 | 9.000 | 244 | 184 | 1.326 | Pool E or Pool F |
| 2 | Bulgaria | 3 | 2 | 1 | 5 | 7 | 5 | 1.400 | 275 | 268 | 1.026 | Pool E or Pool F |
| 3 | Cuba | 3 | 1 | 2 | 4 | 4 | 7 | 0.571 | 248 | 258 | 0.961 | Pool G or Pool H |
| 4 | United States | 3 | 0 | 3 | 3 | 2 | 9 | 0.222 | 214 | 271 | 0.790 | Pool G or Pool H |

| Date | Time | | Score | | Set 1 | Set 2 | Set 3 | Set 4 | Set 5 | Total | Report |
|---|---|---|---|---|---|---|---|---|---|---|---|
| 16 July | 16:26 | Bulgaria | 1–3 | Turkey | 21–25 | 25–19 | 19–25 | 10–25 | | 75–94 | P2 |
| 16 July | 20:38 | Cuba | 3–1 | United States | 25–23 | 23–25 | 25–22 | 25–11 | | 98–81 | P2 |
| 17 July | 14:00 | United States | 1–3 | Bulgaria | 25–23 | 18–25 | 17–25 | 17–25 | | 77–98 | P2 |
| 17 July | 18:00 | Cuba | 0–3 | Turkey | 16–25 | 15–25 | 22–25 | | | 53–75 | P2 |
| 18 July | 16:00 | Bulgaria | 3–1 | Cuba | 25–23 | 25–22 | 27–29 | 25–23 | | 102–97 | P2 |
| 18 July | 20:03 | Turkey | 3–0 | United States | 25–20 | 25–20 | 25–16 | | | 75–56 | P2 |

== Second round ==
=== Pool E (1st–8th) ===
| Pos | Team | Pld | W | L | Pts | SW | SL | SR | SPW | SPL | SPR | Qualification |
|---|---|---|---|---|---|---|---|---|---|---|---|---|
| 1 | Brazil | 3 | 3 | 0 | 6 | 9 | 1 | 9.000 | 254 | 188 | 1.351 | Semifinals |
| 2 | Bulgaria | 3 | 2 | 1 | 5 | 6 | 5 | 1.200 | 229 | 235 | 0.974 | Semifinals |
| 3 | Chinese Taipei | 3 | 1 | 2 | 4 | 6 | 6 | 1.000 | 268 | 268 | 1.000 | 5th–8th place |
| 4 | Netherlands | 3 | 0 | 3 | 3 | 0 | 9 | 0.000 | 173 | 233 | 0.742 | 5th–8th place |

| Date | Time | | Score | | Set 1 | Set 2 | Set 3 | Set 4 | Set 5 | Total | Report |
|---|---|---|---|---|---|---|---|---|---|---|---|
| 20 July | 14:00 | Bulgaria | 3–2 | Chinese Taipei | 25–23 | 19–25 | 20–25 | 25–21 | 15–12 | 104–106 | P2 |
| 20 July | 18:55 | Netherlands | 0–3 | Brazil | 12–25 | 28–30 | 14–25 | | | 54–80 | P2 |
| 21 July | 17:00 | Chinese Taipei | 1–3 | Brazil | 21–25 | 26–24 | 17–25 | 20–25 | | 84–99 | P2 |
| 21 July | 19:25 | Netherlands | 0–3 | Bulgaria | 14–25 | 20–25 | 20–25 | | | 54–75 | P2 |
| 22 July | 14:00 | Brazil | 3–0 | Bulgaria | 25–19 | 25–13 | 25–18 | | | 75–50 | P2 |
| 22 July | 18:45 | Netherlands | 0–3 | Chinese Taipei | 19–25 | 26–28 | 20–25 | | | 65–78 | P2 |

=== Pool F (1st–8th) ===
| Pos | Team | Pld | W | L | Pts | SW | SL | SR | SPW | SPL | SPR | Qualification |
|---|---|---|---|---|---|---|---|---|---|---|---|---|
| 1 | Germany | 3 | 3 | 0 | 6 | 9 | 3 | 3.000 | 286 | 225 | 1.271 | Semifinals |
| 2 | Dominican Republic | 3 | 2 | 1 | 5 | 8 | 5 | 1.600 | 298 | 274 | 1.088 | Semifinals |
| 3 | Turkey | 3 | 1 | 2 | 4 | 6 | 8 | 0.750 | 284 | 299 | 0.950 | 5th–8th place |
| 4 | Mexico | 3 | 0 | 3 | 3 | 2 | 9 | 0.222 | 194 | 264 | 0.735 | 5th–8th place |

| Date | Time | | Score | | Set 1 | Set 2 | Set 3 | Set 4 | Set 5 | Total | Report |
|---|---|---|---|---|---|---|---|---|---|---|---|
| 20 July | 16:37 | Germany | 3–1 | Turkey | 22–25 | 25–20 | 25–7 | 25–19 | | 97–71 | P2 |
| 20 July | 20:50 | Mexico | 0–3 | Dominican Republic | 20–25 | 20–25 | 20–25 | | | 60–75 | P2 |
| 21 July | 14:00 | Germany | 3–2 | Dominican Republic | 22–25 | 29–27 | 26–24 | 22–25 | 15–11 | 114–112 | P2 |
| 21 July | 21:10 | Mexico | 2–3 | Turkey | 28–26 | 14–25 | 25–23 | 16–25 | 8–15 | 91–114 | P2 |
| 22 July | 16:00 | Turkey | 2–3 | Dominican Republic | 20–25 | 26–24 | 25–22 | 22–25 | 7–15 | 100–111 | P2 |
| 22 July | 20:45 | Germany | 3–0 | Mexico | 25–21 | 25–10 | 25–12 | | | 75–43 | P2 |

=== Pool G (9th–16th) ===
| Pos | Team | Pld | W | L | Pts | SW | SL | SR | SPW | SPL | SPR | Qualification |
|---|---|---|---|---|---|---|---|---|---|---|---|---|
| 1 | China | 3 | 3 | 0 | 6 | 9 | 2 | 4.500 | 258 | 198 | 1.303 | 9th–12th place |
| 2 | Cuba | 3 | 2 | 1 | 5 | 8 | 4 | 2.000 | 275 | 250 | 1.100 | 9th–12th place |
| 3 | Thailand | 3 | 1 | 2 | 4 | 4 | 7 | 0.571 | 249 | 256 | 0.973 | 13th–16th place |
| 4 | Kenya | 3 | 0 | 3 | 3 | 1 | 9 | 0.111 | 172 | 250 | 0.688 | 13th–16th place |

| Date | Time | | Score | | Set 1 | Set 2 | Set 3 | Set 4 | Set 5 | Total | Report |
|---|---|---|---|---|---|---|---|---|---|---|---|
| 20 July | 14:00 | Kenya | 1–3 | Thailand | 27–25 | 18–25 | 18–25 | 16–25 | | 79–100 | P2 |
| 20 July | 18:33 | China | 3–2 | Cuba | 20–25 | 23–25 | 25–14 | 25–23 | 15–11 | 108–98 | P2 |
| 21 July | 16:24 | China | 3–0 | Thailand | 25–22 | 25–18 | 25–18 | | | 75–58 | P2 |
| 21 July | 18:00 | Cuba | 3–0 | Kenya | 25–16 | 25–16 | 25–19 | | | 75–51 | P2 |
| 22 July | 14:00 | China | 3–0 | Kenya | 25–13 | 25–13 | 25–16 | | | 75–42 | P2 |
| 22 July | 18:27 | Thailand | 1–3 | Cuba | 24–26 | 16–25 | 26–24 | 25–27 | | 91–102 | P2 |

=== Pool H (9th–16th) ===
| Pos | Team | Pld | W | L | Pts | SW | SL | SR | SPW | SPL | SPR | Qualification |
|---|---|---|---|---|---|---|---|---|---|---|---|---|
| 1 | Czech Republic | 3 | 3 | 0 | 6 | 9 | 2 | 4.500 | 289 | 228 | 1.268 | 9th–12th place |
| 2 | United States | 3 | 2 | 1 | 5 | 8 | 4 | 2.000 | 276 | 252 | 1.095 | 9th–12th place |
| 3 | Poland | 3 | 1 | 2 | 4 | 7 | 7 | 1.000 | 267 | 265 | 1.008 | 13th–16th place |
| 4 | Venezuela | 3 | 0 | 3 | 3 | 0 | 9 | 0.000 | 140 | 227 | 0.617 | 13th–16th place |

| Date | Time | | Score | | Set 1 | Set 2 | Set 3 | Set 4 | Set 5 | Total | Report |
|---|---|---|---|---|---|---|---|---|---|---|---|
| 20 July | 16:07 | United States | 2–3 | Czech Republic | 25–20 | 16–25 | 13–25 | 25–21 | 10–15 | 89–106 | P2 |
| 20 July | 21:02 | Venezuela | 0–3 | Poland | 15–25 | 20–25 | 12–25 | | | 47–75 | P2 |
| 21 July | 14:00 | Poland | 2–3 | United States | 25–21 | 11–25 | 26–24 | 19–25 | 11–15 | 92–110 | P2 |
| 21 July | 20:00 | Venezuela | 0–3 | Czech Republic | 18–25 | 12–25 | 9–25 | | | 39–75 | P2 |
| 22 July | 16:00 | Czech Republic | 3–2 | Poland | 20–25 | 23–25 | 25–17 | 25–21 | 15–12 | 108–100 | P2 |
| 22 July | 20:44 | Venezuela | 0–3 | United States | 12–25 | 17–25 | 25–27 | | | 54–77 | P2 |

== Final round ==
=== 13th–16th bracket ===
Classification
2009-07-24 - Tijuana
Thailand | 3
Venezuela | 2
2009-07-24 - Tijuana
Poland | 3
Kenya | 0

13th place match
2009-07-25 - Tijuana
Thailand | 0
Poland | 3
15th place match
2009-07-25 - Tijuana
Venezuela | 3
Kenya | 1

| Date | Time | | Score | | Set 1 | Set 2 | Set 3 | Set 4 | Set 5 | Total | Report |
|---|---|---|---|---|---|---|---|---|---|---|---|
| 24 July | 12:00 | Thailand | 3–2 | Venezuela | 22–25 | 24–26 | 25–21 | 25–20 | 15–13 | 111–105 | P2 |
| 24 July | 14:05 | Poland | 3–0 | Kenya | 25–12 | 25–5 | 25–14 | | | 75–31 | P2 |

| Date | Time | | Score | | Set 1 | Set 2 | Set 3 | Set 4 | Set 5 | Total | Report |
|---|---|---|---|---|---|---|---|---|---|---|---|
| 25 July | 9:00 | Venezuela | 3–1 | Kenya | 25–20 | 25–9 | 19–25 | 25–17 | | 94–71 | P2 |

| Date | Time | | Score | | Set 1 | Set 2 | Set 3 | Set 4 | Set 5 | Total | Report |
|---|---|---|---|---|---|---|---|---|---|---|---|
| 25 July | 11:09 | Thailand | 0–3 | Poland | 22–25 | 22–25 | 18–25 | | | 62–75 | P2 |

=== 9th–12th bracket ===
Classification
2009-07-24 - Tijuana
China | 3
United States | 0
2009-07-24 - Tijuana
Czech Republic | 1
Cuba | 3

9th place match
2009-07-25 - Tijuana
China | 0
Cuba | 3
12th place match
2009-07-25 - Tijuana
United States | 0
Czech Republic | 3

| Date | Time | | Score | | Set 1 | Set 2 | Set 3 | Set 4 | Set 5 | Total | Report |
|---|---|---|---|---|---|---|---|---|---|---|---|
| 24 July | 16:05 | China | 3–0 | United States | 26–24 | 25–11 | 25–18 | | | 76–53 | P2 |
| 24 July | 18:00 | Czech Republic | 1–3 | Cuba | 24–26 | 16–25 | 25–14 | 19–25 | | 84–90 | P2 |

| Date | Time | | Score | | Set 1 | Set 2 | Set 3 | Set 4 | Set 5 | Total | Report |
|---|---|---|---|---|---|---|---|---|---|---|---|
| 25 July | 13:00 | United States | 0–3 | Czech Republic | 13–25 | 13–25 | 16–25 | | | 42–75 | P2 |

| Date | Time | | Score | | Set 1 | Set 2 | Set 3 | Set 4 | Set 5 | Total | Report |
|---|---|---|---|---|---|---|---|---|---|---|---|
| 25 July | 15:00 | China | 0–3 | Cuba | 22–25 | 21–25 | 19–25 | | | 62–75 | P2 |

=== 5th–8th bracket ===
Classification
2009-07-24 - Mexicali
Chinese Taipei | 3
Mexico | 0
2009-07-24 - Mexicali
Turkey | 2
Netherlands | 3

5th place match
2009-07-25 - Mexicali
Chinese Taipei | 3
Netherlands | 1
8th place match
2009-07-25 - Mexicali
Mexico | 0
Turkey | 3

| Date | Time | | Score | | Set 1 | Set 2 | Set 3 | Set 4 | Set 5 | Total | Report |
|---|---|---|---|---|---|---|---|---|---|---|---|
| 24 July | 14:00 | Chinese Taipei | 3–0 | Mexico | 25–19 | 25–18 | 25–13 | | | 75–50 | P2 |
| 24 July | 16:00 | Turkey | 2–3 | Netherlands | 23–25 | 25–21 | 19–25 | 25–23 | 10–15 | 102–109 | P2 |

| Date | Time | | Score | | Set 1 | Set 2 | Set 3 | Set 4 | Set 5 | Total | Report |
|---|---|---|---|---|---|---|---|---|---|---|---|
| 25 July | 14:00 | Mexico | 0–3 | Turkey | 10–15 | 12–25 | 21–25 | | | 43–65 | P2 |

| Date | Time | | Score | | Set 1 | Set 2 | Set 3 | Set 4 | Set 5 | Total | Report |
|---|---|---|---|---|---|---|---|---|---|---|---|
| 25 July | 16:00 | Chinese Taipei | 3–1 | Netherlands | 18–25 | 25–18 | 25–18 | 25–22 | | 93–83 | P2 |

=== Championship bracket ===
Classification
2009-07-24 - Mexicali
Germany | 3
Bulgaria | 0
2009-07-24 - Mexicali
Brazil | 1
Dominican Republic | 3

Gold Medal match
2009-07-25 - Mexicali
Germany | 3
Dominican Republic | 0
Bronze Medal match
2009-07-25 - Mexicali
Bulgaria | 2
Brazil | 3

==== Semifinals ====
| Date | Time | | Score | | Set 1 | Set 2 | Set 3 | Set 4 | Set 5 | Total | Report |
|---|---|---|---|---|---|---|---|---|---|---|---|
| 24 July | 18:32 | Germany | 3–0 | Bulgaria | 25–21 | 25–12 | 27–25 | | | 77–58 | P2 |
| 24 July | 20:28 | Brazil | 1–3 | Dominican Republic | 21–25 | 25–27 | 25–23 | 15–25 | | 86–100 | P2 |

==== Bronze Medal match ====
| Date | Time | | Score | | Set 1 | Set 2 | Set 3 | Set 4 | Set 5 | Total | Report |
|---|---|---|---|---|---|---|---|---|---|---|---|
| 25 July | 18:20 | Bulgaria | 2–3 | Brazil | 25–19 | 25–21 | 18–25 | 21–25 | 17–19 | 106–109 | P2 |

==== Gold Medal match ====
| Date | Time | | Score | | Set 1 | Set 2 | Set 3 | Set 4 | Set 5 | Total | Report |
|---|---|---|---|---|---|---|---|---|---|---|---|
| 25 July | 20:10 | Germany | 3–0 | Dominican Republic | 28–26 | 26–24 | 25–16 | | | 79–66 | P2 |

== Final standing ==
| Rank | Team |
|---|---|
| 1st place, gold medalist(s) | Germany |
| 2nd place, silver medalist(s) | Dominican Republic |
| 3rd place, bronze medalist(s) | Brazil |
| 4 | Bulgaria |
| 5 | Chinese Taipei |
| 6 | Netherlands |
| 7 | Turkey |
| 8 | Mexico |
| 9 | Cuba |
| 10 | China |
| 11 | Czech Republic |
| 12 | United States |
| 13 | Poland |
| 14 | Thailand |
| 15 | Venezuela |
| 16 | Kenya |

2009 FIVB Women's Junior World champions

Germany
1st title

12–woman Roster
Lenka Dürr, Natalia Cukseeva, Janine Hinderlich, Berit Kauffeldt, Anja Brandt, Lena Möllers, Sarah Petrausch, Ines Bathen, Sina Kostorz, Janine Völker, Laura Weihenmaier, Sandra Sydlik
Head coach
Han Abbing

== Individual awards ==
- Most valuable player
  - Brenda Castillo (DOM)
- Best scorer
  - Chen Shih Ting (TPE)
- Best spiker
  - Chen Shih Ting (TPE)
- Best blocker
  - Nesve Buyukbayram (TUR)
- Best server
  - Gyselle Silva (CUB)
- Best digger
  - Brenda Castillo (DOM)
- Best setter
  - Lena Möllers (GER)
- Best receiver
  - Brenda Castillo (DOM)
- Best libero
  - Brenda Castillo (DOM)

== See also ==
- Results.
- FIVB News.
