= Philippines women's national under-21 volleyball team =

Philippines Under-21
- Association: Philippine National Volleyball Federation
- Confederation: AVC
- Head coach: (Philippines) Francis Vicente

Uniforms
Home	Away

FIVB U21 World Championship
- Appearances: None

Asian Women's U20 Championship
- Appearances: 6 (First in 1992)
- Best result: 7th (1994)

The Philippines women's national under-21 volleyball team represents the Philippines in women's under-20/21 volleyball events. It is controlled and managed by the Philippine National Volleyball Federation (PNVF) that is a member of Asian volleyball body Asian Volleyball Confederation (AVC) and the international volleyball body government the Fédération Internationale de Volleyball (FIVB).

== Rankings ==
This is the current ranking of the under-20 volleyball team of the Philippines in FIVB World Rankings.

FIVB Girls' U21 Ranking as of 24 August 2023
Rank	Team	Points	Confederation
60	Philippines	0	AVC
60	Azerbaijan	0	CEV
60	England	0	CEV

== Previous roster ==
The following roster competed at the 2016 Asian Women's U19 Volleyball Championship, the last competition the Philippines joined in this underage category.

No.	Name	Date of birth	Height	Weight	Spike	Block	2016 club
1	Isabelle Camama	9 June 1998	1.77 m (5 ft 10 in)	70 kg (150 lb)	263 cm (104 in)	264 cm (104 in)	(Philippines) University of the East
2	Jeanette Virginia Villareal	21 July 1998	1.75 m (5 ft 9 in)	59 kg (130 lb)	260 cm (100 in)	262 cm (103 in)	(Philippines) Far Eastern University
3	Mary Anne Mendrez	14 November 1998	1.75 m (5 ft 9 in)	59 kg (130 lb)	260 cm (100 in)	261 cm (103 in)	(Philippines) University of the East
4	Kath Arado (L)	22 May 1998	1.57 m (5 ft 2 in)	50 kg (110 lb)	240 cm (94 in)	240 cm (94 in)	(Philippines) University of the East
6	Seth Marione Rodriguez	22 September 1998	1.77 m (5 ft 10 in)	62 kg (137 lb)	261 cm (103 in)	262 cm (103 in)	(Philippines) University of the East
7	Dianne Latayan	21 April 1998	1.70 m (5 ft 7 in)	59 kg (130 lb)	259 cm (102 in)	260 cm (100 in)	(Philippines) Mapua Institute of Technology
8	Rica Diolan (C)	15 August 1998	1.67 m (5 ft 6 in)	55 kg (121 lb)	254 cm (100 in)	253 cm (100 in)	(Philippines) De La Salle - College of Saint Benilde
9	Jasmine Nabor	11 July 1998	1.70 m (5 ft 7 in)	50 kg (110 lb)	262 cm (103 in)	264 cm (104 in)	(Philippines) National University
10	Mariella Gabarda	13 June 1998	1.75 m (5 ft 9 in)	48 kg (106 lb)	262 cm (103 in)	265 cm (104 in)	(Philippines) University of the East
12	Ria Beatriz Glenell Duremdes	7 June 1998	1.57 m (5 ft 2 in)	47 kg (104 lb)	238 cm (94 in)	237 cm (93 in)	(Philippines) Far Eastern University
13	Trisha Mae Genesis	20 March 2000	1.70 m (5 ft 7 in)	55 kg (121 lb)	260 cm (100 in)	262 cm (103 in)	(Philippines) Holy Rosary College
14	Zilfa Olarve	2 March 1998	1.72 m (5 ft 8 in)	65 kg (143 lb)	263 cm (104 in)	264 cm (104 in)	(Philippines) Holy Rosary College

Coaching staff

- Head coach:
  (Philippines) Francis Vicente
- Assistant coach(s):
  (Philippines) Lerma Giron
  (Philippines) Naela Orozco

Team staff

- Team Manager:
  (Philippines) Marissa Andres

Medical staff

- Physical Therapist/Trainer:
  (Philippines) Christian Santos

== Competition record ==
=== Women's Asian U20 Volleyball Championship ===
The Philippines' Asian Women's U20 Volleyball Championship record
Year	Round	Position	Pld	W	L	SW	SL	Squad
(South Korea) 1980	did not participate							
(Australia) 1984	did not participate							
(Thailand) 1986	did not participate							
(Indonesia) 1988	did not participate							
(Thailand) 1990	did not participate							
(Malaysia) 1992	Classification Round	10th place	4	1	3	4	9	No info
(Philippines) 1994	Round Robin	7th place	No info					
(Thailand) 1996	Round Robin	8th place	No info					
(Thailand) 1998	did not participate							
(Philippines) 2000	Classification Round	12th place	6	0	6	2	18	No info
(Vietnam) 2002	Classification Round	8th place	6	1	5	3	15	No info
(Sri Lanka) 2004	did not participate							
(Thailand) 2006	did not participate							
(Taiwan) 2008	did not participate							
(Vietnam) 2010	did not participate							
(Thailand) 2012	did not participate							
(Taiwan) 2014	did not participate							
(Thailand) 2016	Classification Round	10th place	6	4	2	14	12	–
(Vietnam) 2018	did not participate							
(China) 2020	Cancelled due to COVID-19 pandemic							
(Kazakhstan) 2022	did not participate							
(China) 2024	did not participate							
Total	0 Title(s)							—

== See also ==
- Women's
  - Philippines women's national volleyball team
  - Philippines women's national under-23 volleyball team
  - Philippines women's national under-19 volleyball team
  - Philippines women's national under-17 volleyball team
  - Philippines women's national beach volleyball team
- Men's
  - Philippines men's national volleyball team
  - Philippines men's national under-23 volleyball team
  - Philippines men's national under-19 volleyball team
  - Philippines men's national beach volleyball team
- Volleyball in the Philippines
