= Iran women's national under-21 volleyball team =

Iran Under-20
- Association: Islamic Republic of Iran Volleyball Federation
- Confederation: AVC

Uniforms
Home

FIVB U21 World Championship
- Appearances: None

AVC U20 Asian Championship
- Appearances: 7 (First in 2010)
- Best result: 6th (2022)

The Iran women's national under-20 volleyball team represents Iran in women's under-20 volleyball events. It is controlled and managed by the Islamic Republic of Iran Volleyball Federation (IRIVF) that is a member of Asian volleyball body Asian Volleyball Confederation (AVC) and the international volleyball body government the Fédération Internationale de Volleyball (FIVB).

== Competition history ==
=== World Championship ===
- (Brazil) 1977 – Did not qualify
- (Mexico) 1981 – Did not enter
- (Italy) 1985 – Did not enter
- (South Korea) 1987 – Did not enter
- (Peru) 1989 – Did not enter
- (Czech Republic) 1991 – Did not enter
- (Brazil) 1993 – Did not enter
- (Thailand) 1995 – Did not enter
- (Poland) 1997 – Did not enter
- (Canada) 1999 – Did not enter
- (Dominican Republic) 2001 – Did not enter
- (Thailand) 2003 – Did not enter
- (Turkey) 2005 – Did not enter
- (Thailand) 2007 – Did not enter
- (Mexico) 2009 – Did not enter
- (Peru) 2011 – Did not qualify
- (Czech Republic) 2013 – Did not qualify
- (Puerto Rico) 2015 – Did not qualify
- (Mexico) 2017 – Did not qualify
- (Mexico) 2019 – Did not qualify
- (Netherlands) (Belgium) 2021 – Did not qualify

=== Asian Championship ===
- (South Korea) 1980 – Did not enter
- (Australia) 1984 – Did not enter
- (Thailand) 1986 – Did not enter
- (Indonesia) 1988 – Did not enter
- (Thailand) 1990 – Did not enter
- (Malaysia) 1992 – Did not enter
- (Philippines) 1994 – Did not enter
- (Thailand) 1996 – Did not enter
- (Thailand) 1998 – Did not enter
- (Philippines) 2000 – Did not enter
- (Vietnam) 2002 – Did not enter
- (Sri Lanka) 2004 – Did not enter
- (Thailand) 2006 – Did not enter
- (Taiwan) 2008 – Did not enter
- (Vietnam) 2010 – 9th
- (Thailand) 2012 – 8th
- (Taiwan) 2014 – 12th
- (Thailand) 2016 – 9th
- (Vietnam) 2018 – 8th
- (Kazakhstan) 2022– 6th
- (China) 2024– 9th
