= AVC Women's U20 Volleyball Championship =

International youth volleyball competition

- Most recent season or competition: 2024 Asian Women's U20 Volleyball Championship
- Sport: Volleyball
- Founded: 1980; 46 years ago
- First season: 1980
- Continents: Asia and Oceania (AVC)
- Most recent champions: China (13th title)
- Most titles: China (13 titles)

The AVC Women's U20 Volleyball Championship is an international volleyball competition in Asia and Oceania contested by the under 20 women's national teams of the members of Asian Volleyball Confederation (AVC), the sport's continent governing body. Tournaments have been awarded every two years since 1980. The top four teams qualified for the FIVB Volleyball Women's U21 World Championship. The current champion is China, which won its 13th title at the 2024 tournament.

Formerly, the championship was entitled Asian Women's U19 Volleyball Championship, but in accordance with the FIVB Board of Administration Meeting on 21–22 March 2022, which announced to align the FIVB age group categories per gender to Under-19 and Under-21 for both genders, the adjustment of 2022 Age Group Championships has also been considered important for representative women's age group teams from Asia to compete in the FIVB Age Group Championships in 2023.

The 20 Asian Championship tournaments have been won by three different national teams: China have won twelve times, Japan with seven titles, and South Korea with one title.

== Results summary ==
Year	Host	Final			Third place match			Teams
Year	Host	Champions	Score	Runners-up	Third-place	Score	Fourth-place	Teams
1980; Details	(South Korea); Seoul	South Korea	Round-robin	Japan	India	Round-robin	Singapore	6
1984; Details	(Australia); Canberra	Japan		China	South Korea		Chinese Taipei	6
1986; Details	(Thailand); Bangkok	Japan	3–2	China	South Korea	3–0	Thailand	9
1988; Details	(Indonesia); Jakarta	Japan	3–1	China	South Korea		Indonesia	10
1990; Details	(Thailand); Chiang Mai	Japan		South Korea	China		Chinese Taipei	14
1992; Details	(Malaysia); Kuala Lumpur	China	3–0	South Korea	Chinese Taipei	3–0	Australia	13
1994; Details	(Philippines); Manila	China		Japan	South Korea		Chinese Taipei	10
1996; Details	(Thailand); Chiang Mai	China	Round-robin	Japan	South Korea	Round-robin	Chinese Taipei	11
1998; Details	(Thailand); Trang	China	3–0	South Korea	Japan	3–1	Thailand	10
2000; Details	(Philippines); Dagupan	China	Round-robin	Japan	South Korea	Round-robin	Thailand	8
2002; Details	(Vietnam); Ho Chi Minh City	China		Thailand	Chinese Taipei		South Korea	12
2004; Details	(Sri Lanka); Colombo	China	3–0	Japan	South Korea	3–0	Chinese Taipei	9
2006; Details	(Thailand); Nakhon Ratchasima	China	3–1	Japan	Chinese Taipei	3–1	Thailand	12
2008; Details	(Taiwan); Taipei	Japan	3–0	Chinese Taipei	China	3–0	South Korea	11
2010; Details	(Vietnam); Ho Chi Minh City	China	3–0	South Korea	Japan	3–0	Thailand	15
2012; Details	(Thailand); Nakhon Pathom / Ratchaburi	China	3–0	Chinese Taipei	Japan	3–2	Thailand	16
2014; Details	(Taiwan); Taipei	China	3–1	Japan	South Korea	3–2	Thailand	15
2016; Details	(Thailand); Nakhon Ratchasima	China	3–2	Japan	Thailand	3–1	Vietnam	15
2018; Details	(Vietnam); Bắc Ninh	Japan	3–0	China	Thailand	3–1	Chinese Taipei	15
2020	(China); Chongqing	Cancelled due to COVID-19 pandemic						
2022; Details	(Kazakhstan); Nur Sultan	Japan	3–0	China	Thailand	3–2	South Korea	9
2024; Details	(China); Jiangmen	China	3–2	Japan	South Korea	3–1	Thailand	12
2027; Details	(Indonesia); Medan							

=== Teams reaching the top four ===
Team	Winners	Runners-up	Third-place	Fourth-place
China	13 (1992, 1994, 1996, 1998, 2000, 2002, 2004, 2006, 2010, 2012, 2014, 2016, 2024)	5 (1984, 1986, 1988, 2018, 2022)	2 (1990, 2008)	
Japan	7 (1984, 1986, 1988, 1990, 2008, 2018, 2022)	9 (1980, 1994, 1996, 2000, 2004, 2006, 2014, 2016, 2024)	3 (1998, 2010, 2012)	
South Korea	1 (1980)	4 (1990, 1992, 1998, 2010)	9 (1984, 1986, 1988, 1994, 1996, 2000, 2004, 2014, 2024)	3 (2002, 2008, 2022)
Chinese Taipei		2 (2008, 2012)	3 (1992, 2002, 2006)	6 (1984, 1990, 1994, 1996, 2004, 2018)
Thailand		1 (2002)	3 (2016, 2018, 2022)	7 (1986, 1998, 2000, 2006, 2010, 2012, 2014)
India			1 (1980)	
Singapore				1 (1980)
Indonesia				1 (1988)
Australia				1 (1992)
Vietnam				1 (2016)

=== Champions by region ===
Federation (Region)	Champion(s)	Number
EAZVA (East Asia)	China (12), Japan (7), South Korea (1)	20 titles

== Hosts ==
Times Hosted	Nations	Year(s)
7	Thailand	1986, 1990, 1996, 1998, 2006, 2012, 2016
3	Vietnam	2002, 2010, 2018
2	Philippines	1994, 2000
2	Taiwan	2008, 2014
2	Indonesia	1988, 2027
1	South Korea	1980
1	Australia	1984
1	Malaysia	1992
1	Sri Lanka	2004
1	Kazakhstan	2022
1	China	2024

== Medal table ==
Rank	Nation	Gold	Silver	Bronze	Total
1	China	13	5	2	20
2	Japan	7	9	3	19
3	South Korea	1	4	9	14
4	Chinese Taipei	0	2	3	5
5	Thailand	0	1	3	4
6	India	0	0	1	1
Totals (6 entries)		21	21	21	63

== Participating nations ==
Legend

- 1st – Champions
- 2nd – Runners-up
- 3rd – Third place
- 4th – Fourth place
- • – Did not enter / Did not qualify
- – Hosts
- Q – Qualified for the forthcoming tournament

Year Team	(South Korea) 1980 (6)	(Australia) 1984 (6)	(Thailand) 1986 (9)	(Indonesia) 1988 (10)	(Thailand) 1990 (14)	(Malaysia) 1992 (13)	(Philippines) 1994 (10)	(Thailand) 1996 (11)	(Thailand) 1998 (10)	(Philippines) 2000 (8)	(Vietnam) 2002 (12)	(Sri Lanka) 2004 (9)	(Thailand) 2006 (12)	(Taiwan) 2008 (11)	(Vietnam) 2010 (15)	(Thailand) 2012 (16)	(Taiwan) 2014 (15)	(Thailand) 2016 (15)	(Vietnam) 2018 (15)	(Kazakhstan) 2022 (9)	(China) 2024 (12)	Total
Australia	5th	5th	9th	7th	7th	4th	6th	7th	6th	•	11th	6th	7th	9th	11th	9th	13th	11th	10th	•	11th	19
China	•	2nd	2nd	2nd	3rd	1st	1st	1st	1st	1st	1st	1st	1st	3rd	1st	1st	1st	1st	2nd	2nd	1st	20
Chinese Taipei	•	4th	5th	5th	4th	3rd	4th	4th	5th	5th	3rd	4th	3rd	2nd	5th	2nd	5th	6th	4th	5th	6th	20
Fiji	•	•	•	•	•	•	•	•	•	•	•	•	•	•	13th	•	•	•	•	•	•	1
Guam	•	•	•	•	14th	•	•	•	•	•	•	•	•	•	•	•	•	•	•	•	•	1
Hong Kong	6th	•	•	•	12th	11th	8th	11th	•	•	•	•	•	•	14th	11th	11th	13th	12th	•	12th	11
India	3rd	•	6th	8th	9th	8th	•	6th	•	•	8th	7th	10th	10th	10th	6th	6th	8th	11th	7th	8th	17
Indonesia	•	•	•	4th	8th	9th	9th	•	•	•	9th	•	9th	6th	7th	•	•	•	•	•	•	8
Iran	•	•	•	•	•	•	•	•	•	•	•	•	•	•	9th	8th	12th	9th	8th	6th	9th	7
Japan	2nd	1st	1st	1st	1st	5th	2nd	2nd	3rd	2nd	5th	2nd	2nd	1st	3rd	3rd	2nd	2nd	1st	1st	2nd	21
Kazakhstan	•	•	•	•	•	•	•	•	•	7th	7th	•	•	7th	6th	7th	7th	7th	7th	8th	7th	10
Kuwait	•	•	•	•	•	•	•	•	•	•	•	•	•	•	•	16th	•	•	•	•	•	1
Macau	•	•	•	•	•	•	•	•	•	•	•	•	•	•	•	•	14th	12th	14th	•	•	3
Malaysia	•	•	•	•	11th	7th	10th	•	8th	•	•	•	•	•	•	•	•	•	13th	•	•	5
Maldives	•	•	•	•	•	•	•	•	•	•	•	9th	•	•	•	•	•	•	•	•	•	1
Mongolia	•	•	•	•	•	•	•	•	•	•	•	•	•	•	•	14th	•	•	•	•	•	1
New Zealand	•	6th	•	10th	10th	12th	•	•	•	•	10th	•	8th	8th	12th	12th	9th	14th	9th	•	10th	13
North Korea	•	•	•	•	5th	•	•	•	•	6th	•	•	•	•	•	•	•	•	•	•	•	2
Philippines	•	•	•	•	•	10th	7th	8th	•	8th	12th	•	•	•	•	•	•	10th	•	•	•	6
Singapore	4th	•	7th	9th	•	•	•	•	9th	•	•	•	11th	•	•	•	•	•	•	•	•	5
South Korea	1st	3rd	3rd	3rd	2nd	2nd	3rd	3rd	2nd	3rd	4th	3rd	5th	4th	2nd	5th	3rd	5th	5th	4th	3rd	21
Sri Lanka	•	•	8th	•	13th	13th	•	10th	10th	•	•	8th	12th	11th	15th	13th	8th	15th	15th	•	•	13
Thailand	•	•	4th	6th	6th	6th	5th	5th	4th	4th	2nd	5th	4th	5th	4th	4th	4th	3rd	3rd	3rd	4th	19
Turkmenistan	•	•	•	•	•	•	•	•	•	•	•	•	•	•	•	15th	15th	•	•	•	•	2
Uzbekistan	•	•	•	•	•	•	•	•	•	•	•	•	•	•	•	•	•	•	•	9th	•	1
Vietnam	•	•	•	•	•	•	•	9th	7th	•	6th	•	6th	•	8th	10th	10th	4th	6th	•	5th	10

=== Debut of teams ===
Year	Debutants	Total
1980	Australia	6
1980	Hong Kong	6
1980	India	6
1980	Japan	6
1980	Singapore	6
1980	South Korea	6
1984	China	3
1984	Chinese Taipei	3
1984	New Zealand	3
1986	Sri Lanka	2
1986	Thailand	2
1988	Indonesia	1
1990	Guam	3
1990	Malaysia	3
1990	North Korea	3
1992	Philippines	1
1994	None	0
1996	Vietnam	1
1998	None	0
2000	Kazakhstan	1
2002	None	0
2004	Maldives	1
2006	None	0
2008	None	0
2010	Fiji	2
2010	Iran	2
2012	Kuwait	3
2012	Mongolia	3
2012	Turkmenistan	3
2014	Macau	1
2016	None	0
2018	None	0
2022	Uzbekistan	1

== Awards ==
=== Most Valuable Player ===
Year	Most Valuable Player
2006	(China) Yan Ni
2008	(Japan) Yuki Kawai
2010	(China) Liu Yanhan
2012	(China) Zhu Ting
2014	(China) Du Qingqing
2016	(China) Wu Han
2018	(Japan) Kanon Sonoda

=== Best Opposite Spiker ===
Year	Best Opposite Spiker
2014	(Japan) Kaori Mabashi
2016	(Thailand) Pimpichaya Kokram
2018	(China) Xu Luyao

=== Best Outside Spikers ===
Year	Best Outside Spikers
2014	(South Korea) Lee Jae-yeong
2014	(China) Du Qingqing
2016	(China) Cai Xiaoqing
2016	(Japan) Reina Tokoku
2018	(Thailand) Thanacha Sooksod
2018	(Japan) Ayumi Yoshida

=== Best Middle Blockers ===
Year	Best Middle Blockers
2014	(China) Hu Mingyuan
2014	(China) Zhang Qian
2016	(China) Xie Xing
2016	(China) Yang Hanyu
2018	(Chinese Taipei) Wen Yi-chin
2018	(China) Jiao Dian

=== Best Setter ===
Year	Best Setter
2006	(Japan) Miho Watanabe
2008	(Japan) Yuki Kawai
2010	(China) Wu Bei
2012	(Japan) Yuki Yamagami
2014	(South Korea) Lee Da-yeong
2016	(Japan) Tamaki Matsui
2018	(Japan) Kanon Sonoda

=== Best Libero ===
Year	Best Libero
2000	(Japan) Megumi Kawashima
2006	(China) Wang Qian
2008	(Japan) Kotoe Inoue
2010	(Japan) Sumiko Mori
2012	(Chinese Taipei) Huang Shih-ting
2014	(South Korea) Park Hea-mi
2016	(Japan) Yukako Yasui
2018	(Japan) Sayaka Daikuzono

== Former awards ==
=== Best Scorer ===
Tournament	Best Scorer
2006 Nakhon Ratchasima	(Chinese Taipei) Wu Shu-fen
2008 Taipei	(Chinese Taipei) Chen Wan-ting
2010 Ho Chi Minh City	(South Korea) Park Jeong-ah
2012 Nakhon Pathom	(Thailand) Kuttika Kaewpin

=== Best Spiker ===
Tournament	Best Scorer
2006 Nakhon Ratchasima	(China) Chen Yao
2008 Taipei	(Chinese Taipei) Chen Shih-ting
2010 Ho Chi Minh City	(Japan) Mari Horikawa
2012 Nakhon Pathom	(China) Zhu Ting

=== Best Server ===
Tournament	Best Server
2000 Dagupan	(Japan) Ai Otomo
2006 Nakhon Ratchasima	(China) Fan Linlin
2008 Taipei	(South Korea) Joo Yea-na
2010 Ho Chi Minh City	(Japan) Mari Horikawa
2012 Nakhon Pathom	(China) Tang Ningya

=== Best Blocker ===
Tournament	Best Scorer
2006 Nakhon Ratchasima	(China) Yan Ni
2008 Taipei	(China) Yang Junjing
2010 Ho Chi Minh City	(China) Yang Zhou
2012 Nakhon Pathom	(China) Zheng Yixin

== See also ==
- AVC Men's U20 Volleyball Championship
- AVC Women's Volleyball Continental Championship
- AVC Girls' U18 Volleyball Championship
- AVC Girls' U16 Volleyball Championship
