= India women's national under-21 volleyball team =

India Under-20
- Association: Volleyball Federation of India
- Confederation: AVC

Uniforms
Home

FIVB U21 World Championship
- Appearances: 1 (First in 1981)
- Best result: 11th (1981)

AVC U20 Asian Championship
- Appearances: 17 (First in 1980)
- Best result: (bronze) (1980)

The India women's national under-20 volleyball team represents India in women's under-20 volleyball events. It is controlled and managed by the Volleyball Federation of India (VFI), which is a member of the Asian volleyball body Asian Volleyball Confederation (AVC) and the international volleyball body government the Fédération Internationale de Volleyball (FIVB).

== Competition history ==
=== World Championship ===
- (Brazil) 1977 – Did not qualify
- (Mexico) 1981 – 11th
- (Italy) 1985 – Did not enter
- (South Korea) 1987 – Did not qualify
- (Peru) 1989 – Did not qualify
- (Czech Republic) 1991 – Did not qualify
- (Brazil) 1993 – Did not qualify
- (Thailand) 1995 – Did not enter
- (Poland) 1997 – Did not qualify
- (Canada) 1999 – Did not enter
- (Dominican Republic) 2001 – Did not enter
- (Thailand) 2003 – Did not qualify
- (Turkey) 2005 – Did not qualify
- (Thailand) 2007 – Did not qualify
- (Mexico) 2009 – Did not qualify
- (Peru) 2011 – Did not qualify
- (Czech Republic) 2013 – Did not qualify
- (Puerto Rico) 2015 – Did not qualify
- (Mexico) 2017 – Did not qualify
- (Italy) 2019 – Did not qualify
- (Belgium) (Netherlands) 2021 – Did not qualify
- (Mexico) 2023 – Did not qualify

=== Asian Championship ===
- (South Korea) 1980 – (bronze) Bronze medal
- (Australia) 1984 – Did not enter
- (Thailand) 1986 – 6th
- (Indonesia) 1988 – 8th
- (Thailand) 1990 – 9th
- (Malaysia) 1992 – 8th
- (Philippines) 1994 – Did not enter
- (Thailand) 1996 – 6th
- (Thailand) 1998 – Did not enter
- (Philippines) 2000 – Did not enter
- (Vietnam) 2002 – 8th
- (Sri Lanka) 2004 – 7th
- (Thailand) 2006 – 10th
- (Taiwan) 2008 – 10th
- (Vietnam) 2010 – 10th
- (Thailand) 2012 – 6th
- (Taiwan) 2014 – 6th
- (Thailand) 2016 – 8th
- (Vietnam) 2018 – 11th
- (Kazakhstan) 2022 – 7th
- (China) 2024 – 8th
