= Vietnam women's national under-21 volleyball team =

Vietnam
- Association: Volleyball Federation of Vietnam
- Confederation: AVC
- Head coach: (Vietnam) Nguyễn Trọng Linh

Uniforms
Home	Away	Third

FIVB U21 World Championship
- Appearances: 1 (First in 2025)
- Best result: 19th (2025)

Asian U20 Championship
- Appearances: 10 (First in 1996)
- Best result: 4th (2016)

Vietnam women's national under-21 volleyball team (Vietnamese: Đội tuyển bóng chuyền nữ U21 quốc gia Việt Nam) represents Vietnam in women's under-21 and 20 level in international volleyball competitions. It is controlled and managed by the Volleyball Federation of Vietnam (VFF) that is a member of Asian volleyball body Asian Volleyball Confederation (AVC) and the international volleyball body government the Fédération Internationale de Volleyball (FIVB).

== Competition history ==
=== World Championship ===
- (Indonesia) 2025 — 19th place

=== Asian Championship ===
- (Thailand) 1996 — 9th place
- (Thailand) 1998 — 7th place
- (Vietnam) 2002 — 6th place
- (Thailand) 2006 — 6th place
- (Vietnam) 2010 — 8th place
- (Thailand) 2012 — 10th place
- (Taiwan) 2014 — 10th place
- (Thailand) 2016 — 4th place
- (Vietnam) 2018 — 6th place
- (China) 2024 — 5th place

=== ASEAN Championship ===
- (Thailand) 2016 — Silver Medal

=== VTV Cup ===
- (Vietnam) 2018 — 7th Place
- (Vietnam) 2025 — 6th Place

=== VTV9 – Binh Dien Cup ===
- (Vietnam) 2024 — 8th Place

== Current squad ==
- Head coach: (Vietnam) Nguyễn Trọng Linh
- Assistant Coaches:
  - (Vietnam) Tạ Đức Hiếu
  - (Vietnam) Vũ Thị Hoa
  - (Vietnam) Nguyễn Ngọc Dũng
- Doctor: (Vietnam) Bùi Giang Nam

The following list consists of 12 players who are called for 2025 FIVB Volleyball Women's U21 World Championship:

#	Pos	Name	Date of Birth	Height	Weight	Spike	Block	2025 club
1	MB	Lê Như Anh	July 23, 2005 (age 21)	1.78 m (5 ft 10 in)	58 kg (128 lb)	290 cm (110 in)	285 cm (112 in)	(Vietnam) VTV Bình Điền Long An
5	OH	Bùi Thị Ánh Thảo	May 4, 2009 (age 17)	1.75 m (5 ft 9 in)	61 kg (134 lb)	285 cm (9 ft 4 in)	276 cm (9 ft 1 in)	(Vietnam) Hà Nội VC
7	L	Hà Kiều Vy	September 12, 2006 (age 20)	1.66 m (5 ft 5 in)	58 kg (128 lb)	–	–	(Vietnam) Vietinbank VC
10	MB	Lê Thùy Linh	January 18, 2009 (age 17)	1.78 m (5 ft 10 in)	60 kg (130 lb)	298 cm (117 in)	288 cm (113 in)	(Vietnam) Hà Nội VC
12	OH	Đặng Thị Hồng (captain)	August 12, 2006 (age 20)	1.70 m (5 ft 7 in)	65 kg (143 lb)	295 cm (116 in)	288 cm (113 in)	(Vietnam) Thái Nguyên VC
14	OH	Phạm Quỳnh Hương	February 14, 2008 (age 18)	1.87 m (6 ft 2 in)	72 kg (159 lb)	300 cm (120 in)	293 cm (115 in)	(Vietnam) Binh chủng Thông tin
16	L	Nguyễn Lan Vy	February 18, 2006 (age 20)	1.72 m (5 ft 8 in)	66 kg (146 lb)	286 cm (113 in)	280 cm (110 in)	(Vietnam) VTV Bình Điền Long An
18	OP	Phạm Thùy Linh	December 18, 2005 (age 20)	1.75 m (5 ft 9 in)	60 kg (130 lb)	286 cm (113 in)	273 cm (107 in)	(Vietnam) Hà Nội VC
20	S	Nguyễn Vân Hà	February 21, 2005 (age 21)	1.75 m (5 ft 9 in)	60 kg (130 lb)	285 cm (112 in)	280 cm (110 in)	(Vietnam) IMP Bắc Ninh
21	MB	Nguyễn Phương Quỳnh	February 21, 2005 (age 21)	1.78 m (5 ft 10 in)	62 kg (137 lb)	294 cm (116 in)	288 cm (113 in)	(Vietnam) Vietinbank VC
22	S	Lại Thị Khánh Huyền	March 21, 2005 (age 21)	1.73 m (5 ft 8 in)	61 kg (134 lb)	286 cm (113 in)	282 cm (111 in)	(Vietnam) Binh chủng Thông tin
23	OP	Ngô Thị Bích Huệ	April 23, 2006 (age 20)	1.82 m (6 ft 0 in)	69 kg (152 lb)	295 cm (116 in)	288 cm (113 in)	(Vietnam) Binh chủng Thông tin

Notes:

- ^{OP} Opposite Spiker
- ^{OH} Outside Hitter
- ^{MB} Middle Blocker
- ^{S} Setter
- ^{L} Libero
