= 1992 Asian Junior Women's Volleyball Championship =

1990 Asian Junior Women's Championship
Tournament details
- Host country: Malaysia
- Dates: 22–29 August
- Teams: 13
- Venue: 1 (in 1 host city)

Final positions
- Champions: Japan (3rd title)

The 1992 Asian Junior Women's Volleyball Championship was held in Kuala Lumpur, Malaysia from 22 – August to 29 August 1992

== Pools composition ==
The teams are seeded based on their final ranking at the 1990 Asian Junior Women's Volleyball Championship.

Pool A	Pool B	Pool C	Pool D
Malaysia (Host & 11th); Australia (8th); Hong Kong	Japan (1st); Thailand (6th); New Zealand	South Korea (2nd); India (9th); Philippines	China (3rd); Chinese Taipei (4th); Indonesia; Sri Lanka

== Preliminary round ==
=== Pool A ===
Pos	Team	Pld	W	L	Pts	SW	SL	SR	SPW	SPL	SPR	Qualification
1	Australia	2	2	0	4	6	1	6.000	0	0	—	Pool E
2	Malaysia	2	1	1	3	4	3	1.333	0	0	—	Pool E
3	Hong Kong	2	0	2	2	0	6	0.000	0	0	—	

Date		Score		Set 1	Set 2	Set 3	Set 4	Set 5	Total
22 Aug	Malaysia	3–0	Hong Kong	15–9	15–9	15–8			46–20
23 Aug	Australia	3–1	Malaysia						
24 Aug	Australia	3–1	Hong Kong	15–9	15–8	16–18	15–5		61–39

=== Pool B ===
Pos	Team	Pld	W	L	Pts	SW	SL	SR	SPW	SPL	SPR	Qualification
1	Japan	2	2	0	4	6	1	6.000	0	0	—	Pool F
2	Thailand	2	1	1	3	4	3	1.333	0	0	—	Pool F
3	New Zealand	2	0	2	2	0	6	0.000	0	0	—	

Date		Score		Set 1	Set 2	Set 3	Set 4	Set 5	Total
22 Aug	Japan	3–1	Thailand	15–6	15–10	16–17	15–4		62–37
23 Aug	Thailand	3–?	New Zealand						
24 Aug	Japan	3–0	New Zealand	15–1	15–2	15–0			45–3

=== Pool C ===
Pos	Team	Pld	W	L	Pts	SW	SL	SR	SPW	SPL	SPR	Qualification
1	South Korea	2	2	0	4	6	0	MAX	0	0	—	Pool E
2	India	2	1	1	3	3	4	0.750	0	0	—	Pool E
3	Philippines	2	0	2	2	1	6	0.167	0	0	—	

Date		Score		Set 1	Set 2	Set 3	Set 4	Set 5	Total
22 Aug	South Korea	3–0	India	15–4	15–4	16–1			45–8
23 Aug	India	3–1	Philippines						
24 Aug	South Korea	3–0	Philippines	15–1	15–1	15–1			45–3

=== Pool D ===
Pos	Team	Pld	W	L	Pts	SW	SL	SR	SPW	SPL	SPR	Qualification
1	China	3	3	0	6	9	1	9.000	0	0	—	Pool F
2	Chinese Taipei	3	2	1	5	7	3	2.333	0	0	—	Pool F
3	Indonesia	3	1	2	4	3	6	0.500	0	0	—	
4	Sri Lanka	3	0	3	3	0	9	0.000	0	0	—	

Date		Score		Set 1	Set 2	Set 3	Set 4	Set 5	Total
22 Aug	Chinese Taipei	3–0	Sri Lanka	15–0	15–0	16–3			45–3
22 Aug	China	3–0	Indonesia	15–2	15–1	15–4			45–7
23 Aug	Chinese Taipei	3–?	Indonesia						
23 Aug	China	3–?	Sri Lanka						
24 Aug	Indonesia	3–0	Sri Lanka	15–7	15–3	15–10			45–20
24 Aug	China	3–1	Chinese Taipei	15–1	16–14	13–15	15–3		59–32

== Classification round ==
- The results and the points of the matches between the same teams that were already played during the preliminary round shall be taken into account for the classification round.

=== Pool E ===
Pos	Team	Pld	W	L	Pts	SW	SL	SR	SPW	SPL	SPR	Qualification
1	South Korea	3	3	0	6	9	0	MAX	0	0	—	Semifinals
2	Australia	3	2	1	5	7	4	1.750	0	0	—	Semifinals
3	India	3	1	2	4	3	6	0.500	0	0	—	
4	Malaysia	3	0	3	3	1	9	0.111	0	0	—	

Date		Score		Set 1	Set 2	Set 3	Set 4	Set 5	Total
25 Aug	Australia	3–?	India						
25 Aug	South Korea	3–?	Malaysia						
26 Aug	South Korea	3–0	Australia	15–1	15–1	15–1			45–3
26 Aug	India	3–0	Malaysia	15–10	15–12	15–8			45–30

=== Pool F ===
Pos	Team	Pld	W	L	Pts	SW	SL	SR	SPW	SPL	SPR	Qualification
1	China	3	3	0	6	9	1	9.000	0	0	—	Semifinals
2	Chinese Taipei	3	2	1	5	7	3	2.333	0	0	—	Semifinals
3	Japan	3	1	2	4	3	7	0.429	0	0	—	
4	Thailand	3	0	3	3	1	9	0.111	0	0	—	

Date		Score		Set 1	Set 2	Set 3	Set 4	Set 5	Total
25 Aug	Japan	3–?	Chinese Taipei						
25 Aug	China	3–?	Thailand						
26 Aug	Chinese Taipei	3–0	Thailand	15–4	15–7	15–7			45–18
26 Aug	China	3–1	Japan	15–5	15–10	15–5			45–30

== Classification 9th–12th ==
9th–12th places
25 Aug – Kuala Lumpur
Philippines	3
Hong Kong	?
25 Aug – Kuala Lumpur
Indonesia	3
New Zealand	?

9th place
26 Aug – Kuala Lumpur
Philippines	0
Indonesia	3
11th place
26 Aug – Kuala Lumpur
Hong Kong	3
New Zealand	2

=== Semifinals ===
Date		Score		Set 1	Set 2	Set 3	Set 4	Set 5	Total
25 Aug	Philippines	3–?	Hong Kong						
25 Aug	Indonesia	3–?	New Zealand						

=== 11th place ===
Date		Score		Set 1	Set 2	Set 3	Set 4	Set 5	Total
26 Aug	Hong Kong	3–2	New Zealand	11–15	13–15	15–3	15–8	15–12	69–53

=== 9th place ===
Date		Score		Set 1	Set 2	Set 3	Set 4	Set 5	Total
26 Aug	Indonesia	3–0	Philippines	15–7	15–4	15–0			45–13

== Final round ==
=== Classification 5th–8th ===
5th–8th places
28 Aug – Kuala Lumpur
Thailand	3
India	0
28 Aug – Kuala Lumpur
Japan	3
Malaysia	0

5th place
29 Aug – Kuala Lumpur
Thailand	0
Japan	3
7th place
29 Aug – Kuala Lumpur
India	1
Malaysia	3

=== Championship ===
Semifinals
28 Aug – Kuala Lumpur
South Korea	3
Chinese Taipei	0
28 Aug – Kuala Lumpur
China	3
Australia	0

Final
29 Aug – Kuala Lumpur
South Korea	0
China	3
3rd place
29 Aug – Kuala Lumpur
Chinese Taipei	3
Australia	0

=== 5th–8th semifinals ===
Date		Score		Set 1	Set 2	Set 3	Set 4	Set 5	Total
28 Aug	Thailand	3–0	India	15–4	15–3	15–9			45–16
28 Aug	Japan	3–0	Malaysia	15–2	15–0	15–5			45–7

=== Semifinals ===
Date		Score		Set 1	Set 2	Set 3	Set 4	Set 5	Total
21 Aug	South Korea	3–0	Chinese Taipei	15–8	15–3	15–12			45–33
21 Aug	China	3–0	Australia	15–1	15–2	15–4			45–7

=== 7th place ===
Date		Score		Set 1	Set 2	Set 3	Set 4	Set 5	Total
29 Oct	Malaysia	3–1	India						

=== 5th place ===
Date		Score		Set 1	Set 2	Set 3	Set 4	Set 5	Total
29 Oct	Japan	3–0	Thailand	15–5	15–10	15–5			45–20

=== 3rd place ===
Date		Score		Set 1	Set 2	Set 3	Set 4	Set 5	Total
29 Aug	Chinese Taipei	3–0	Australia	15–13	15–0	15–3			45–16

=== Final ===
Date		Score		Set 1	Set 2	Set 3	Set 4	Set 5	Total
29 Aug	China	3–0	South Korea	15–10	15–6	15–2			45–18

== Final standing ==
Rank	Team
1st place, gold medalist(s)	China
2nd place, silver medalist(s)	South Korea
3rd place, bronze medalist(s)	Chinese Taipei
4	Australia
5	Japan
6	Thailand
7	Malaysia
8	India
9	Indonesia
10	Philippines
11	Hong Kong
12	New Zealand
13	Sri Lanka

Qualified for the 1993 World Junior Championship

1992 Asian Junior Women's champions

China
First title
