= 1994 Asian Junior Women's Volleyball Championship =

1994 Asian Junior Women's Championship
Tournament details
- Host country: Philippines
- Teams: 6
- Venue: 1 (in 1 host city)

Final positions
- Champions: China (2nd title)

The 1994 Asian Junior Women's Volleyball Championship was held in Manila, Philippines

== Results ==
Pos	Team	Pld	W	L	Pts	SW	SL	SR	SPW	SPL	SPR
1st place, gold medalist(s)	China	0	0	0	0	0	0	—	0	0	—
2nd place, silver medalist(s)	Japan	0	0	0	0	0	0	—	0	0	—
3rd place, bronze medalist(s)	South Korea	0	0	0	0	0	0	—	0	0	—
4	Chinese Taipei	0	0	0	0	0	0	—	0	0	—
5	Thailand	0	0	0	0	0	0	—	0	0	—
6	Australia	0	0	0	0	0	0	—	0	0	—
7	Philippines	0	0	0	0	0	0	—	0	0	—
8	Hong Kong	0	0	0	0	0	0	—	0	0	—
9	Indonesia	0	0	0	0	0	0	—	0	0	—
10	Malaysia	0	0	0	0	0	0	—	0	0	—

== Final standing ==
Rank	Team
1st place, gold medalist(s)	China
2nd place, silver medalist(s)	Japan
3rd place, bronze medalist(s)	South Korea
4	Chinese Taipei
5	Thailand
6	Australia
7	Philippines
8	Hong Kong
9	Indonesia
10	Malaysia

Qualified for the 1995 World Junior Championship

1994 Asian Junior Women's champions

China
Second title
