= 1984 Asian Junior Women's Volleyball Championship =

1984 Asian Junior Women's Championship
Tournament details
- Host country: Australia
- Teams: 6
- Venue: 1 (in 1 host city)

Final positions
- Champions: Japan (1st title)

The 1984 Asian Junior Women's Volleyball Championship was held in Canberra, Australia

== Results ==
| Pos | Team | Pld | W | L | Pts | SW | SL | SR | SPW | SPL | SPR |
|---|---|---|---|---|---|---|---|---|---|---|---|
| 1st place, gold medalist(s) | Japan | 0 | 0 | 0 | 0 | 0 | 0 | — | 0 | 0 | — |
| 2nd place, silver medalist(s) | China | 0 | 0 | 0 | 0 | 0 | 0 | — | 0 | 0 | — |
| 3rd place, bronze medalist(s) | South Korea | 0 | 0 | 0 | 0 | 0 | 0 | — | 0 | 0 | — |
| 4 | Chinese Taipei | 0 | 0 | 0 | 0 | 0 | 0 | — | 0 | 0 | — |
| 5 | Australia | 0 | 0 | 0 | 0 | 0 | 0 | — | 0 | 0 | — |
| 6 | New Zealand | 0 | 0 | 0 | 0 | 0 | 0 | — | 0 | 0 | — |

== Final standing ==
| Rank | Team |
|---|---|
| 1st place, gold medalist(s) | Japan |
| 2nd place, silver medalist(s) | China |
| 3rd place, bronze medalist(s) | South Korea |
| 4 | Chinese Taipei |
| 5 | Australia |
| 6 | New Zealand |

| Qualified for the 1985 World Junior Championship |

1984 Asian Junior Women's champions

Japan
First title
