= 2000 Asian Junior Women's Volleyball Championship =

2000 Asian Junior Women's Championship
Tournament details
- Host country: Philippines
- Dates: 12–17 September
- Teams: 8
- Venue: 1 (in 1 host city)

Final positions
- Champions: China (5th title)

The 2000 Asian Junior Women's Volleyball Championship was held in Dagupan, Philippines, from 12 September to 17 September 2000. Games were held at the Dagupan Astrodome. It was organized by the Asian Volleyball Confederation (AVC) with the Philippine Amateur Volleyball Association (PAVA). The opening ceremony was held a day before the competition proper.

China won the championship.

== Pools composition ==
The teams are seeded based on their final ranking at the 1998 Asian Junior Women's Volleyball Championship.

Pool A	Pool B
Philippines (Host); Japan (3rd); Thailand; North Korea	China (1st); South Korea (2nd); Chinese Taipei; Kazakhstan

== Preliminary round ==
=== Pool A ===
Pos	Team	Pld	W	L	Pts	SW	SL	SR	SPW	SPL	SPR	Qualification
1	Japan	3	3	0	6	9	0	MAX	230	129	1.783	Championship round
2	Thailand	3	2	1	5	6	4	1.500	205	199	1.030	Championship round
3	North Korea	3	1	2	4	4	6	0.667	222	203	1.094	
4	Philippines	3	0	3	3	0	9	0.000	99	225	0.440	

Date		Score		Set 1	Set 2	Set 3	Set 4	Set 5	Total
12 Sep	North Korea	3–0	Philippines	25–9	25–11	25–15			75–35
12 Sep	Japan	3–0	Thailand	25–18	25–15	25–9			75–42
13 Sep	Philippines	0–3	Thailand	6–25	14–25	12–25			32–75
13 Sep	Japan	3–0	North Korea	25–16	25–11	30–28			80–55
14 Sep	Philippines	0–3	Japan	8–25	17–25	7–25			32–75
14 Sep	North Korea	1–3	Thailand	25–12	23–25	20–25	24–26		92–88

=== Pool B ===
Pos	Team	Pld	W	L	Pts	SW	SL	SR	SPW	SPL	SPR	Qualification
1	China	3	3	0	6	9	3	3.000	269	223	1.206	Championship round
2	South Korea	3	2	1	5	7	4	1.750	265	209	1.268	Championship round
3	Chinese Taipei	3	1	2	4	6	6	1.000	249	236	1.055	
4	Kazakhstan	3	0	3	3	0	9	0.000	110	225	0.489	

Date		Score		Set 1	Set 2	Set 3	Set 4	Set 5	Total
12 Sep	Kazakhstan	0–3	South Korea	5–25	20–25	12–25			37–75
12 Sep	China	3–2	Chinese Taipei	9–25	25–20	25–21	19–25	15–12	93–103
13 Sep	South Korea	3–1	Chinese Taipei	25–14	25–10	21–25	25–22		96–71
13 Sep	Kazakhstan	0–3	China	15–25	5–25	6–25			26–75
14 Sep	Chinese Taipei	3–0	Kazakhstan	25–12	25–20	25–15			75–47
14 Sep	China	3–1	South Korea	25–21	25–22	26–28	25–23		101–94

== Final round ==
- The results and the points of the matches between the same teams that were already played during the preliminary round shall be taken into account for the final round.

=== Classification 5th–8th ===
Pos	Team	Pld	W	L	Pts	SW	SL	SR	SPW	SPL	SPR
5	Chinese Taipei	3	3	0	6	9	0	MAX	225	137	1.642
6	North Korea	3	2	1	5	6	3	2.000	211	156	1.353
7	Kazakhstan	3	1	2	4	3	8	0.375	202	247	0.818
8	Philippines	3	0	3	3	2	9	0.222	161	259	0.622

Date		Score		Set 1	Set 2	Set 3	Set 4	Set 5	Total
16 Sep	North Korea	3–0	Kazakhstan	25–11	25–15	25–20			75–46
16 Sep	Philippines	0–3	Chinese Taipei	10–25	8–25	11–25			29–75
17 Sep	Philippines	2–3	Kazakhstan	25–23	16–25	25–21	19–25	12–15	97–109
17 Sep	North Korea	0–3	Chinese Taipei	21–25	20–25	20–25			61–75

=== Championship ===
Pos	Team	Pld	W	L	Pts	SW	SL	SR	SPW	SPL	SPR
1	China	3	3	0	6	9	3	3.000	292	257	1.136
2	Japan	3	2	1	5	7	4	1.750	247	219	1.128
3	South Korea	3	1	2	4	5	6	0.833	253	250	1.012
4	Thailand	3	0	3	3	1	9	0.111	182	248	0.734

Date		Score		Set 1	Set 2	Set 3	Set 4	Set 5	Total
16 Sep	Japan	3–1	South Korea	25–14	22–25	27–25	25–20		99–84
16 Sep	Thailand	1–3	China	24–26	21–25	25–22	20–25		90–98
17 Sep	Thailand	0–3	South Korea	14–25	16–25	20–25			50–75
17 Sep	Japan	1–3	China	25–18	12–25	16–25	20–25		73–93

== Final standing ==
Rank	Team
1st place, gold medalist(s)	China
2nd place, silver medalist(s)	Japan
3rd place, bronze medalist(s)	South Korea
4	Thailand
5	Chinese Taipei
6	North Korea
7	Kazakhstan
8	Philippines

Qualified for the 2001 World Junior Championship

2000 Asian Junior Women's champions

China
Fifth title

== Awards ==
- Best server: (Japan) Ai Otomo
- Best libero: (Japan) Megumi Kawashima
