= 2008 Asian Junior Women's Volleyball Championship =

2008 Asian Junior Women's Championship

Tournament details
- Host country: Taiwan
- Dates: 20–28 September
- Teams: 11
- Venue: 1 (in 1 host city)

Final positions
- Champions: Japan (5th title)

Tournament awards
- MVP: (Japan) Yuki Kawai

The 2008 Asian Junior Women's Volleyball Championship was held in Taipei, Republic of China from 20 September to 28 September 2008.

== Pools composition ==
The teams are seeded based on their final ranking at the 2006 Asian Junior Women's Volleyball Championship.

Pool A	Pool B
Chinese Taipei (Host & 3rd); Thailand (4th); Kazakhstan; Australia; Indonesia	China (1st); Japan (2nd); Sri Lanka; India; New Zealand; South Korea

== Preliminary round ==
=== Pool A ===
Pos	Team	Pld	W	L	Pts	SW	SL	SR	SPW	SPL	SPR	Qualification
1	Chinese Taipei	4	4	0	8	12	0	MAX	300	181	1.657	Quarterfinals
2	Thailand	4	3	1	7	9	3	3.000	284	209	1.359	Quarterfinals
3	Indonesia	4	2	2	6	6	10	0.600	317	350	0.906	Quarterfinals
4	Kazakhstan	4	1	3	5	5	10	0.500	277	342	0.810	Quarterfinals
5	Australia	4	0	4	4	3	12	0.250	263	359	0.733	

Date	Time		Score		Set 1	Set 2	Set 3	Set 4	Set 5	Total
20 Sep	16:00	Indonesia	3–2	Australia	25–15	26–28	25–22	22–25	16–14	114–104
20 Sep	19:00	Chinese Taipei	3–0	Kazakhstan	25–10	25–15	25–12			75–37
21 Sep	17:00	Thailand	3–0	Australia	25–10	25–12	25–15			75–37
21 Sep	19:00	Chinese Taipei	3–0	Indonesia	25–21	25–13	25–13			75–47
22 Sep	17:00	Kazakhstan	2–3	Indonesia	25–21	19–25	17–25	25–22	10–15	96–108
22 Sep	19:00	Thailand	0–3	Chinese Taipei	22–25	16–25	21–25			59–75
23 Sep	17:00	Kazakhstan	0–3	Thailand	10–25	20–25	19–25			49–75
23 Sep	19:00	Australia	0–3	Chinese Taipei	11–25	13–25	14–25			38–75
24 Sep	11:00	Indonesia	0–3	Thailand	17–25	16–25	15–25			48–75
24 Sep	13:00	Australia	1–3	Kazakhstan	15–25	25–20	21–25	23–25		84–95

=== Pool B ===
Pos	Team	Pld	W	L	Pts	SW	SL	SR	SPW	SPL	SPR	Qualification
1	Japan	5	5	0	10	15	4	3.750	440	258	1.705	Quarterfinals
2	China	5	4	1	9	14	4	3.500	421	275	1.531	Quarterfinals
3	South Korea	5	3	2	8	12	7	1.714	420	352	1.193	Quarterfinals
4	New Zealand	5	1	4	6	6	12	0.500	296	400	0.740	Quarterfinals
5	India	5	1	4	6	5	14	0.357	305	425	0.718	
6	Sri Lanka	5	1	4	6	3	14	0.214	229	401	0.571	

Date	Time		Score		Set 1	Set 2	Set 3	Set 4	Set 5	Total
20 Sep	10:00	India	3–2	New Zealand	25–21	19–25	25–23	18–25	15–8	102–102
20 Sep	12:00	Sri Lanka	0–3	South Korea	8–25	13–25	12–25			33–75
20 Sep	14:00	China	2–3	Japan	19–25	25–22	25–16	21–25	7–15	97–103
21 Sep	11:00	Japan	3–2	South Korea	22–25	25–27	25–19	25–18	15–10	112–99
21 Sep	13:00	China	3–0	New Zealand	25–9	25–11	25–12			75–32
21 Sep	15:00	Sri Lanka	3–2	India	13–25	25–22	20–25	25–18	15–11	98–101
22 Sep	11:00	China	3–0	Sri Lanka	25–11	25–11	25–9			75–31
22 Sep	13:00	South Korea	3–0	India	25–12	25–15	25–14			75–41
22 Sep	15:00	New Zealand	0–3	Japan	9–25	4–25	7–25			20–75
23 Sep	11:00	Japan	3–0	India	25–8	25–12	25–5			75–25
23 Sep	13:00	New Zealand	3–0	Sri Lanka	25–20	25–17	25–13			75–50
23 Sep	15:00	South Korea	1–3	China	15–25	16–25	26–24	16–25		73–99
24 Sep	15:00	Sri Lanka	0–3	Japan	3–25	4–25	10–25			17–75
24 Sep	17:00	India	0–3	China	15–25	11–25	10–25			36–75
24 Sep	19:00	New Zealand	1–3	South Korea	15–25	25–23	14–25	13–25		67–98

== Classification 9th–11th ==
9th–11th places
26 September – Taipei
Australia	3
Sri Lanka	1
26 September – Taipei
India
Bye

9th place
27 September – Taipei
Australia	3
India	1

=== Semifinals ===
Date	Time		Score		Set 1	Set 2	Set 3	Set 4	Set 5	Total
26 Sep	11:00	Australia	3–1	Sri Lanka	25–17	25–20	19–25	25–19		94–81

=== 9th place ===
Date	Time		Score		Set 1	Set 2	Set 3	Set 4	Set 5	Total
27 Sep	11:00	Australia	3–1	India	25–21	25–19	24–26	25–19		99–85

== Final round ==
Quarterfinals
26 September – Taipei
Chinese Taipei	3
New Zealand	0
26 September – Taipei
China	3
Indonesia	0
26 September – Taipei
Japan	3
Kazakhstan	0
26 September – Taipei
Thailand	0
South Korea	3

Semifinals
27 September – Taipei
Chinese Taipei	3
China	2
27 September – Taipei
Japan	3
South Korea	0

Final
28 September – Taipei
Chinese Taipei	0
Japan	3
3rd place
28 September – Taipei
South Korea	0
China	3

5th–8th places
27 September – Taipei
New Zealand	0
Indonesia	3
27 September – Taipei
Kazakhstan	1
Thailand	3

5th place
28 September – Taipei
Indonesia	0
Thailand	3
7th place
28 September – Taipei
New Zealand	0
Kazakhstan	3

=== Quarterfinals ===
Date	Time		Score		Set 1	Set 2	Set 3	Set 4	Set 5	Total
26 Sep	13:00	Chinese Taipei	3–0	New Zealand	25–11	25–19	25–20			75–50
26 Sep	15:00	Japan	3–0	Kazakhstan	25–8	25–10	25–18			75–36
26 Sep	17:00	Thailand	0–3	South Korea	21–25	11–25	15–25			47–75
26 Sep	19:00	China	3–0	Indonesia	25–11	25–10	25–18			75–39

=== 5th–8th semifinals ===
Date	Time		Score		Set 1	Set 2	Set 3	Set 4	Set 5	Total
27 Sep	13:00	New Zealand	0–3	Indonesia	20–25	16–25	25–27			61–77
27 Sep	15:00	Kazakhstan	1–3	Thailand	15–25	25–19	11–25	22–25		73–94

=== Semifinals ===
Date	Time		Score		Set 1	Set 2	Set 3	Set 4	Set 5	Total
27 Sep	17:00	Japan	3–0	South Korea	25–21	25–17	25–15			75–53
27 Sep	19:00	Chinese Taipei	3–2	China	25–23	23–25	18–25	25–17	15–11	106–101

=== 7th place ===
Date	Time		Score		Set 1	Set 2	Set 3	Set 4	Set 5	Total
28 Sep	11:00	New Zealand	0–3	Kazakhstan	23–25	25–27	17–25			65–77

=== 5th place ===
Date	Time		Score		Set 1	Set 2	Set 3	Set 4	Set 5	Total
28 Sep	13:00	Indonesia	0–3	Thailand	20–25	22–25	17–25			59–75

=== 3rd place ===
Date	Time		Score		Set 1	Set 2	Set 3	Set 4	Set 5	Total
28 Sep	15:00	South Korea	0–3	China	23–25	22–25	13–25			58–75

=== Final ===
Date	Time		Score		Set 1	Set 2	Set 3	Set 4	Set 5	Total
28 Sep	17:00	Chinese Taipei	0–3	Japan	18–25	17–25	23–25			58–75

== Final standing ==
Rank	Team
1st place, gold medalist(s)	Japan
2nd place, silver medalist(s)	Chinese Taipei
3rd place, bronze medalist(s)	China
4	South Korea
5	Thailand
6	Indonesia
7	Kazakhstan
8	New Zealand
9	Australia
10	India
11	Sri Lanka

Qualified for the 2009 World Junior Championship

2008 Asian Junior Women's champions

Japan
Fifth title

Team Roster
Yuki Kawai, Kotoe Inoue, Kaori Kodaira, Saki Minemura, Nana Iwasaka, Hiroko Matsuura, Airi Kawahara, Rina Urabe, Aika Akutagawa, Erika Sakae, Miyu Nagaoka, Sayuri Tamura

Head Coach: Aihara Noboru

== Awards ==
- MVP: (Japan) Yuki Kawai
- Best scorer: (Chinese Taipei) Chen Wan-ting
- Best spiker: (Chinese Taipei) Chen Shih-ting
- Best blocker: (China) Yang Junjing
- Best server: (South Korea) Joo Yea-na
- Best setter: (Japan) Yuki Kawai
- Best libero: (Japan) Kotoe Inoue

== See also ==
- List of sporting events in Taiwan
