= 1980 Asian Junior Women's Volleyball Championship =

1980 Asian Junior Women's Championship
Tournament details
- Host country: South Korea
- Dates: 19–27 October
- Teams: 6
- Venue: 1 (in 1 host city)

Final positions
- Champions: South Korea (1st title)

The 1980 Asian Junior Women's Volleyball Championship was held in Seoul, South Korea from 19 October to 27 October 1980

== Results ==
Pos	Team	Pld	W	L	Pts	SW	SL	SR	SPW	SPL	SPR
1st place, gold medalist(s)	South Korea	5	5	0	10	15	0	MAX	0	0	—
2nd place, silver medalist(s)	Japan	5	4	1	9	12	3	4.000	0	0	—
3rd place, bronze medalist(s)	India	5	3	2	8	9	7	1.286	0	0	—
4	Singapore	5	2	3	7	6	12	0.500	0	0	—
5	Australia	5	1	4	6	6	14	0.429	0	0	—
6	Hong Kong	5	0	5	5	3	15	0.200	0	0	—

Date		Score		Set 1	Set 2	Set 3	Set 4	Set 5	Total
19 Oct	Australia	3–2	Hong Kong	15–11	15–12	1–15	14–16	15–7	60–61
19 Oct	Japan	3–0	India	15–3	15–4	15–7			45–14
19 Oct	South Korea	3–0	Singapore	15–5	15–0	15–0			45–5
20 Oct	India	3–1	Australia	15–11	15–3	12–15	15–11		57–40
20 Oct	Japan	3–0	Singapore	15–1	15–10	15–8			45–19
21 Oct	South Korea	3–0	India	15–0	15–1	15–4			45–5
21 Oct	Singapore	3–1	Hong Kong	15–12	15–17	15–3	15–3		60–35
22 Oct	Japan	3–0	Hong Kong						
22 Oct	South Korea	3–0	Australia						
23 Oct	India	3–0	Singapore	15–9	18–16	15–6			48–31
23 Oct	Japan	3–0	Australia	15–2	15–2	15–1			45–5
24 Oct	South Korea	3–0	Hong Kong						
25 Oct	Singapore'	3–2	Australia						
25 Oct	India	3–0	Hong Kong						
26 Oct	South Korea	3–0	Japan						

== Final standing ==
Rank	Team
1st place, gold medalist(s)	South Korea
2nd place, silver medalist(s)	Japan
3rd place, bronze medalist(s)	India
4	Singapore
5	Australia
6	Hong Kong

Qualified for the 1981 World Junior Championship

1980 Asian Junior Women's champions

South Korea
First title
