= 1986 Asian Junior Women's Volleyball Championship =

1986 Asian Junior Women's Championship
Tournament details
- Host country: Thailand
- Dates: 18–25 October
- Teams: 9
- Venue: 1 (in 1 host city)

Final positions
- Champions: Japan (2nd title)

The 1986 Asian Junior Women's Volleyball Championship was held in Bangkok, Thailand from 18 October to 25 October 1986

== Preliminary round ==
=== Pool A ===
| Pos | Team | Pld | W | L | Pts | SW | SL | SR | SPW | SPL | SPR | Qualification |
|---|---|---|---|---|---|---|---|---|---|---|---|---|
| 1 | South Korea | 3 | 3 | 0 | 6 | 9 | 0 | MAX | 0 | 0 | — | Semifinals |
| 2 | Thailand | 3 | 2 | 1 | 5 | 6 | 3 | 2.000 | 0 | 0 | — | Semifinals |
| 3 | Singapore | 3 | 1 | 2 | 4 | 3 | 6 | 0.500 | 0 | 0 | — | |
| 4 | Sri Lanka | 3 | 0 | 3 | 3 | 0 | 9 | 0.000 | 0 | 0 | — | |

| Date | | Score | | Set 1 | Set 2 | Set 3 | Set 4 | Set 5 | Total |
|---|---|---|---|---|---|---|---|---|---|
| 19 Oct | Thailand | 3–0 | Singapore | 15–12 | 15–12 | 15–10 | | | 45–34 |
| 20 Oct | South Korea | 3–0 | Sri Lanka | 15–2 | 15–4 | 15–1 | | | 45–7 |
| 21 Oct | South Korea | 3–0 | Singapore | 15–0 | 15–4 | 15–2 | | | 45–6 |
| 22 Oct | Singapore | 3–0 | Sri Lanka | 15–2 | 15– | 15–8 | | | 45– |
| 22 Oct | South Korea | 3–0 | Thailand | 15–3 | 15–8 | 15–6 | | | 45–17 |
| 23 Oct | Thailand | 3–0 | Sri Lanka | | | | | | |

=== Pool B ===
| Pos | Team | Pld | W | L | Pts | SW | SL | SR | SPW | SPL | SPR | Qualification |
|---|---|---|---|---|---|---|---|---|---|---|---|---|
| 1 | China | 4 | 4 | 0 | 8 | 12 | 2 | 6.000 | 0 | 0 | — | Semifinals |
| 2 | Japan | 4 | 3 | 1 | 7 | 11 | 3 | 3.667 | 0 | 0 | — | Semifinals |
| 3 | Chinese Taipei | 4 | 2 | 2 | 6 | 6 | 6 | 1.000 | 0 | 0 | — | |
| 4 | India | 4 | 1 | 3 | 5 | 3 | 10 | 0.300 | 0 | 0 | — | |
| 5 | Australia | 4 | 0 | 4 | 4 | 1 | 12 | 0.083 | 0 | 0 | — | |

| Date | | Score | | Set 1 | Set 2 | Set 3 | Set 4 | Set 5 | Total |
|---|---|---|---|---|---|---|---|---|---|
| 19 Oct | Chinese Taipei | 3–0 | Australia | 15–1 | 15–1 | 15–11 | | | 45–13 |
| 19 Oct | Japan | 3–0 | India | 15–5 | 15–4 | 15–5 | | | 45–14 |
| 20 Oct | India | 3–1 | Australia | 15–2 | 7–15 | 15–10 | 15–12 | | 52–39 |
| 20 Oct | China | 3–2 | Japan | 6–15 | 15–6 | 17–15 | 15–10 | 15–12 | 68–56 |
| 21 Oct | Chinese Taipei | 3–0 | India | 15–4 | 15–5 | 15–6 | | | 45–15 |
| 21 Oct | China | 3–0 | Australia | 15–4 | 15–14 | 15–2 | | | 45–10 |
| 22 Oct | Japan | 3–0 | Australia | 15–5 | 15–2 | 15–1 | | | 45–8 |
| 22 Oct | China | 3–0 | Chinese Taipei | 15–9 | 15–5 | 15–8 | | | 45–15 |
| 23 Oct | China | 3–0 | India | | | | | | |
| 23 Oct | Japan | 3–? | Chinese Taipei | | | | | | |

== Final round ==
=== Classification 5th–8th ===
5th–8th places
24 Oct – Bangkok
India | 3
Singapore | 1
24 Oct – Bangkok
Chinese Taipei | 3
Sri Lanka | 0

5th place
25 Oct– Bangkok
Chinese Taipei | 3
India | 0
7th place
25 Oct – Bangkok
Singapore | 3
Sri Lanka | 0

| Date | | Score | | Set 1 | Set 2 | Set 3 | Set 4 | Set 5 | Total |
|---|---|---|---|---|---|---|---|---|---|
| 24 Oct | India | 3–1 | Singapore | 15–9 | 15–8 | 15–17 | 15–6 | | 60–40 |
| 24 Oct | Chinese Taipei | 3–0 | Sri Lanka | 15–2 | 15–3 | 15–2 | | | 45–7 |

| Date | | Score | | Set 1 | Set 2 | Set 3 | Set 4 | Set 5 | Total |
|---|---|---|---|---|---|---|---|---|---|
| 25 Oct | Chinese Taipei | 3–0 | India | | | | | | |
| 25 Oct | Singapore | 3–0 | Sri Lanka | 15–7 | 15–7 | 15–4 | | | 45–18 |

=== Championship ===
Semifinals
24 Oct – Bangkok
Japan | 3
South Korea | 1
24 Oct – Bangkok
China | 3
Thailand | 0

Final
25 Oct – Bangkok
Japan | 3
China | 2
3rd place
25 Oct – Bangkok
South Korea | 3
Thailand | 0

| Date | | Score | | Set 1 | Set 2 | Set 3 | Set 4 | Set 5 | Total |
|---|---|---|---|---|---|---|---|---|---|
| 24 Oct | Japan | 3–1 | South Korea | 15–10 | 14–16 | 15–10 | 15–9 | | 59–45 |
| 24 Oct | China | 3–0 | Thailand | 15–5 | 15–2 | 15–0 | | | 45–7 |

| Date | | Score | | Set 1 | Set 2 | Set 3 | Set 4 | Set 5 | Total |
|---|---|---|---|---|---|---|---|---|---|
| 25 Oct | Japan | 3–2 | China | 15–17 | 15–4 | 15–6 | 7–15 | 15–6 | 67–48 |
| 25 Oct | South Korea | 3–0 | Thailand | 15–2 | 15–4 | 15–7 | | | 45–13 |

== Final standing ==
| Rank | Team |
|---|---|
| 1st place, gold medalist(s) | Japan |
| 2nd place, silver medalist(s) | China |
| 3rd place, bronze medalist(s) | South Korea |
| 4 | Thailand |
| 5 | Chinese Taipei |
| 6 | India |
| 7 | Singapore |
| 8 | Sri Lanka |
| 9 | Australia |

| Qualified for the 1987 World Junior Championship |

1986 Asian Junior Women's champions

Japan
Second title
