= 2004 Asian Junior Women's Volleyball Championship =

2004 Asian Junior Women's Championship
Tournament details
- Host country: Sri Lanka
- Dates: 19–26 September
- Teams: 9
- Venue: 1 (in 1 host city)

Final positions
- Champions: China (7th title)

The 2004 Asian Junior Women's Volleyball Championship was held in Sugathadasa Indoor Stadium, Colombo, Sri Lanka from 19 September to 26 September 2004.

== Pools composition ==
The teams are seeded based on their final ranking at the 2002 Asian Junior Women's Volleyball Championship.

Pool A	Pool B
Sri Lanka (Host); Chinese Taipei (3rd); Maldives; South Korea; Australia	China (1st); Thailand (2nd); India; Japan

== Preliminary round ==
=== Pool A ===
Pos	Team	Pld	W	L	Pts	SW	SL	SR	SPW	SPL	SPR	Qualification
1	South Korea	4	4	0	8	12	0	MAX	0	0	—	Semifinals
2	Chinese Taipei	4	3	1	7	9	4	2.250	286	191	1.497	Semifinals
3	Australia	4	2	2	6	7	6	1.167	278	240	1.158	5th–8th classification
4	Sri Lanka	4	1	3	5	3	9	0.333	0	0	—	5th–8th classification
5	Maldives	4	0	4	4	0	12	0.000	300	359	0.836	

Date		Score		Set 1	Set 2	Set 3	Set 4	Set 5	Total
19 Sep	South Korea	3–0	Australia	25–21	25–15	25–17			75–53
19 Sep	Sri Lanka	3–0	Maldives	25–11	25–7	25–10			75–28
20 Sep	Chinese Taipei	3–1	Australia	22–25	25–21	25–16	25–13		97–75
20 Sep	South Korea	3–0	Maldives	25–7	25–3	25–4			75–14
21 Sep	Australia	3–0	Maldives	25–9	25–10	25–9			75–28
21 Sep	Chinese Taipei	3–0	Sri Lanka	25–7	25–9	25–13			75–29
22 Sep	Chinese Taipei	3–0	Maldives	25–1	25–4	25–7			75–12
22 Sep	South Korea	3–0	Sri Lanka	25–12	25–9				
23 Sep	South Korea	3–0	Chinese Taipei	25–15	25–10	25–14			75–39
23 Sep	Sri Lanka	0–3	Australia	7–25	18–25	15–25			40–75

=== Pool B ===
Pos	Team	Pld	W	L	Pts	SW	SL	SR	SPW	SPL	SPR	Qualification
1	Japan	3	3	0	6	9	2	4.500	266	187	1.422	Semifinals
2	China	3	2	1	5	7	4	1.750	0	0	—	Semifinals
3	Thailand	3	1	2	4	5	6	0.833	0	0	—	5th–8th classification
4	India	3	0	3	3	0	9	0.000	132	225	0.587	5th–8th classification

Date		Score		Set 1	Set 2	Set 3	Set 4	Set 5	Total
19 Sep	China	3–1	Thailand		25–22	25–22	25–12		
20 Sep	Japan	3–0	India	25–12	25–17	25–11			75–40
21 Sep	India	0–3	Thailand	17–25	19–25	15–25			51–75
22 Sep	Thailand	1–3	Japan	15–25	15–25	25–20	12–25		67–95
22 Sep	China	3–0	India	25–13	25–20	25–8			75–41
23 Sep	China	1–3	Japan	25–21	23–25	17–25	15–25		80–96

== Classification 5th–8th ==
5th–8th places
24 September – Colombo
Australia	3
India	0
24 September – Colombo
Thailand	3
Sri Lanka	0

5th place
25 September – Colombo
Australia	0
Thailand	3
7th place
25 September – Colombo
India	3
Sri Lanka	0

=== Semifinals ===
Date		Score		Set 1	Set 2	Set 3	Set 4	Set 5	Total
24 Sep	Australia	3–0	India	25–14	25–22	25–8			75–44
24 Sep	Thailand	3–0	Sri Lanka	25–8	25–12	25–17			75–35

=== 7th place ===
Date		Score		Set 1	Set 2	Set 3	Set 4	Set 5	Total
25 Sep	India	3–0	Sri Lanka	25–16	25–8	25–16			75–40

=== 5th place ===
Date		Score		Set 1	Set 2	Set 3	Set 4	Set 5	Total
25 Sep	Australia	0–3	Thailand	15–25	18–25	17–25			50–75

== Final round ==
Semifinals
25 September – Colombo
South Korea	0
China	3
25 September – Colombo
Japan	3
Chinese Taipei	0

Final
26 September – Colombo
China	3
Japan	0
3rd place
26 September – Colombo
South Korea	3
Chinese Taipei	0

=== Semifinals ===
Date		Score		Set 1	Set 2	Set 3	Set 4	Set 5	Total
25 Sep	South Korea	0–3	China						
25 Sep	Japan	3–0	Chinese Taipei	25–21	25–18	25–20			75–59

=== 3rd place ===
Date		Score		Set 1	Set 2	Set 3	Set 4	Set 5	Total
26 Sep	South Korea	3–0	Chinese Taipei	25–12	25–19	25–13			75–44

=== Final ===
Date		Score		Set 1	Set 2	Set 3	Set 4	Set 5	Total
26 Sep	China	3–0	Japan	25–16	25–22	25–20			75–58

== Final standing ==
Rank	Team
1st place, gold medalist(s)	China
2nd place, silver medalist(s)	Japan
3rd place, bronze medalist(s)	South Korea
4	Chinese Taipei
5	Thailand
6	Australia
7	India
8	Sri Lanka
9	Maldives

Qualified for the 2005 World Junior Championship

2004 Asian Junior Women's champions

China
Seventh title
