= 1988 Asian Junior Women's Volleyball Championship =

1988 Asian Junior Women's Championship
Tournament details
- Host country: Indonesia
- Dates: 14–22 August
- Teams: 10
- Venue: 1 (in 1 host city)

Final positions
- Champions: Japan (3rd title)

The 1988 Asian Junior Women's Volleyball Championship was held in Jakarta, Indonesia from 14 August to 22 August 1988

== Preliminary round ==
=== Pool A ===
Pos	Team	Pld	W	L	Pts	SW	SL	SR	SPW	SPL	SPR	Qualification
1	South Korea	4	4	0	8	12	0	MAX	0	0	—	Semifinals
2	Indonesia	4	3	1	7	9	3	3.000	0	0	—	Semifinals
3	Thailand	4	2	2	6	6	6	1.000	0	0	—	
4	India	4	1	3	5	3	9	0.333	0	0	—	
5	New Zealand	4	0	4	4	0	12	0.000	0	0	—	

Date		Score		Set 1	Set 2	Set 3	Set 4	Set 5	Total
14 Aug	Indonesia	3–0	Thailand	15–5	16–14	15–2			46–21
14 Aug	South Korea	3–0	India	15–0	15–6	15–0			45–6
15 Aug	South Korea	3–0	Thailand						
15 Aug	Indonesia	3–0	New Zealand						
16 Aug	India	3–0	New Zealand	15–4	15–9	15–3			45–16
16 Aug	South Korea	3–0	Indonesia	15–5	15–2	15–3			45–10
17 Aug	South Korea	3–0	New Zealand	15–0	15–4	15–1			45–5
17 Aug	Thailand	3–0	India	15–12	15–6	15–6			45–24
18 Aug	Thailand	3–0	New Zealand	15–8	15–2	15–2			45–12
19 Aug	Indonesia	3–0	India	15–6	15–10	15–12			45–28

=== Pool B ===
Pos	Team	Pld	W	L	Pts	SW	SL	SR	SPW	SPL	SPR	Qualification
1	China	4	4	0	8	12	1	12.000	0	0	—	Semifinals
2	Japan	4	3	1	7	10	3	3.333	0	0	—	Semifinals
3	Chinese Taipei	4	2	2	6	6	6	1.000	0	0	—	
4	Australia	4	1	3	5	3	9	0.333	0	0	—	
5	Singapore	4	0	4	4	0	12	0.000	0	0	—	

Date		Score		Set 1	Set 2	Set 3	Set 4	Set 5	Total
14 Aug	China	3–0	Singapore	15–2	15–2	15–1			45–5
14 Aug	Japan	3–0	Australia	15–2	15–1	15–8			45–11
15 Aug	Australia	3–0	Singapore	15–9	7–4	15–4			52–15
15 Aug	Japan	3–0	Chinese Taipei						
16 Aug	China	3–0	Chinese Taipei	15–3	15–6	15–3			45–12
16 Aug	Japan	3–0	Singapore	15–3	15–0	15–3			45–6
17 Aug	China	3–0	Australia	15–0	15–1	15–6			45–7
17 Aug	Chinese Taipei	3–0	Singapore	15–0	15–3	15–0			45–3
18 Aug	Chinese Taipei	3–0	Australia	15–1	15–2	15–1			45–4
19 Aug	China	3–1	Japan	10–15	15–10	15–11	15–2		55–38

== Classification 9th–10th ==
Date		Score		Set 1	Set 2	Set 3	Set 4	Set 5	Total
21 Aug	Singapore	3–?	New Zealand						

== Final round ==
=== Classification 5th–8th ===
5th–8th places
21 Aug – Jakarta
Thailand	3
Australia	0
21 Aug – Jakarta
Chinese Taipei	3
India	?

5th place
22 Aug – Jakarta
Thailand	?
Chinese Taipei	3
7th place
22 Aug – Jakarta
Australia	3
India	0

=== Championship ===
Semifinals
21 Aug – Jakarta
Japan	3
South Korea	?
21 Aug – Jakarta
China	3
Indonesia	1

Final
22 Aug – Jakarta
Japan	3
China	1
3rd place
22 Aug – Jakarta
South Korea	3
Indonesia	?

=== 5th–8th semifinals ===
Date		Score		Set 1	Set 2	Set 3	Set 4	Set 5	Total
24 Aug	Thailand	3–0	Australia	15–9	15–9	15–6			45–24
24 Aug	Chinese Taipei	3–?	India						

=== Semifinals ===
Date		Score		Set 1	Set 2	Set 3	Set 4	Set 5	Total
21 Aug	Japan	3–?	South Korea						
21 Aug	China	3–1	Indonesia						

=== 7th place ===
Date		Score		Set 1	Set 2	Set 3	Set 4	Set 5	Total
25 Oct	Australia	3–0	India	14–15	16–14	15–3			48–32

=== 5th place ===
Date		Score		Set 1	Set 2	Set 3	Set 4	Set 5	Total
25 Oct	Chinese Taipei	3–?	Thailand						

=== 3rd place ===
Date		Score		Set 1	Set 2	Set 3	Set 4	Set 5	Total
22 Aug	South Korea	3–?	Indonesia						

=== Final ===
Date		Score		Set 1	Set 2	Set 3	Set 4	Set 5	Total
22 Aug	Japan	3–1	China	15–12	15–5	6–15	15–6		51–38

== Final standing ==
Rank	Team
1st place, gold medalist(s)	Japan
2nd place, silver medalist(s)	China
3rd place, bronze medalist(s)	South Korea
4	Indonesia
5	Chinese Taipei
6	Thailand
7	Australia
8	India
9	Singapore
10	New Zealand

Qualified for the 1989 World Junior Championship

1988 Asian Junior Women's champions

Japan
Third title
