= 2014 Asian Women's U19 Volleyball Championship =

2014 Asian Junior Women's Championship

Tournament details
- Host country: Taiwan
- Dates: 16–24 July
- Teams: 15
- Venues: 2 (in 1 host city)

Final positions
- Champions: China (11th title)

Tournament awards
- MVP: (China) Du Qingqing

The 2014 Asian Junior Women's Volleyball Championship held in the University of Taipei Tianmu Campus Gymnasium and the Taipei Gymnasium, in Taipei, Taiwan from 16 July to 27 July 2014. It acted as the Asian qualifying tournament for the 2015 FIVB Women's Junior World Championship.

== Venues ==
- Taipei Gymnasium, Taipei – Pool C, D and Classification 9th–15th
- University of Taipei, Taipei – Pool A, B and Final Round

== Pools composition ==
The teams are seeded based on their final ranking at the 2012 Asian Junior Women's Volleyball Championship.

Pool A	Pool B	Pool C	Pool D
Chinese Taipei (Host & 2nd); Iran (8th); Sri Lanka	China (1st); Kazakhstan (7th); New Zealand; Vietnam	Japan (3rd); India (6th); Turkmenistan; Hong Kong	Thailand (4th); South Korea (5th); Australia; Macau

== Preliminary round ==
=== Pool A ===
Pos	Team	Pld	W	L	Pts	SW	SL	SR	SPW	SPL	SPR	Qualification
1	Chinese Taipei	2	2	0	6	6	0	MAX	150	74	2.027	Pool E
2	Sri Lanka	2	1	1	3	3	4	0.750	127	155	0.819	Pool E
3	Iran	2	0	2	0	1	6	0.167	119	167	0.713	Pool G

Date	Time		Score		Set 1	Set 2	Set 3	Set 4	Set 5	Total	Report
16 Jul	19:00	Chinese Taipei	3–0	Sri Lanka	25–16	25–12	25–7			75–35	Report
17 Jul	16:00	Chinese Taipei	3–0	Iran	25–11	25–13	25–15			75–39	Report
18 Jul	16:00	Sri Lanka	3–1	Iran	25–15	16–25	26–24	25–16		92–80	Report

=== Pool B ===
Pos	Team	Pld	W	L	Pts	SW	SL	SR	SPW	SPL	SPR	Qualification
1	China	3	3	0	9	9	0	MAX	225	91	2.473	Pool F
2	Kazakhstan	3	2	1	5	6	5	1.200	207	235	0.881	Pool F
3	Vietnam	3	1	2	4	5	6	0.833	223	230	0.970	Pool H
4	New Zealand	3	0	3	0	0	9	0.000	126	225	0.560	Pool H

Date	Time		Score		Set 1	Set 2	Set 3	Set 4	Set 5	Total	Report
16 Jul	13:00	Vietnam	3–0	New Zealand	25–12	25–20	25–19			75–51	Report
16 Jul	15:00	China	3–0	Kazakhstan	25–13	25–8	25–7			75–28	Report
17 Jul	12:00	Kazakhstan	3–0	New Zealand	25–19	25–22	25–10			75–51	Report
17 Jul	14:00	China	3–0	Vietnam	25–15	25–15	25–9			75–39	Report
18 Jul	12:00	Kazakhstan	3–2	Vietnam	26–24	25–21	14–25	24–26	15–13	104–109	Report
18 Jul	14:00	China	3–0	New Zealand	25–6	25–4	25–14			75–24	Report

=== Pool C ===
Pos	Team	Pld	W	L	Pts	SW	SL	SR	SPW	SPL	SPR	Qualification
1	Japan	3	3	0	9	9	0	MAX	225	76	2.961	Pool E
2	India	3	2	1	6	6	4	1.500	200	199	1.005	Pool E
3	Hong Kong	3	1	2	3	4	6	0.667	173	207	0.836	Pool G
4	Turkmenistan	3	0	3	0	0	9	0.000	109	225	0.484	Pool G

Date	Time		Score		Set 1	Set 2	Set 3	Set 4	Set 5	Total	Report
16 Jul	11:00	Japan	3–0	Hong Kong	25–8	25–6	25–11			75–25	Report
16 Jul	15:00	Turkmenistan	0–3	India	18–25	14–25	19–25			51–75	Report
17 Jul	16:00	Hong Kong	1–3	India	14–25	19–25	25–17	15–25		73–92	Report
17 Jul	18:00	Japan	3–0	Turkmenistan	25–5	25–7	25–6			75–18	Report
18 Jul	16:00	India	0–3	Japan	7–25	13–25	13–25			33–75	Report
18 Jul	18:00	Turkmenistan	0–3	Hong Kong	15–25	13–25	12–25			40–75	Report

=== Pool D ===
Pos	Team	Pld	W	L	Pts	SW	SL	SR	SPW	SPL	SPR	Qualification
1	Thailand	3	3	0	9	9	1	9.000	244	153	1.595	Pool F
2	South Korea	3	2	1	6	7	3	2.333	238	143	1.664	Pool F
3	Australia	3	1	2	2	3	8	0.375	187	248	0.754	Pool H
4	Macau	3	0	3	1	2	9	0.222	134	259	0.517	Pool H

Date	Time		Score		Set 1	Set 2	Set 3	Set 4	Set 5	Total	Report
16 Jul	11:00	Australia	0–3	South Korea	12–25	11–25	9–25			32–75	Report
16 Jul	13:00	Thailand	3–0	Macau	25–6	25–8	25–5			75–19	Report
17 Jul	12:00	Macau	0–3	South Korea	5–25	5–25	7–25			17–75	Report
17 Jul	14:00	Thailand	3–0	Australia	25–9	25–15	25–22			75–46	Report
18 Jul	12:00	Australia	3–2	Macau	25–22	20–25	25–15	24–26	15–10	109–98	Report
18 Jul	14:00	South Korea	1–3	Thailand	20–25	25–19	22–25	21–25		88–94	Report

== Classification round ==
- The results and the points of the matches between the same teams that were already played during the preliminary round shall be taken into account for the classification round.

=== Pool E ===
Pos	Team	Pld	W	L	Pts	SW	SL	SR	SPW	SPL	SPR	Qualification
1	Japan	3	3	0	9	9	0	MAX	225	118	1.907	Quarterfinals
2	Chinese Taipei	3	2	1	6	6	3	2.000	193	149	1.295	Quarterfinals
3	India	3	1	2	3	3	6	0.500	147	191	0.770	Quarterfinals
4	Sri Lanka	3	0	3	0	0	9	0.000	118	225	0.524	Quarterfinals

Date	Time		Score		Set 1	Set 2	Set 3	Set 4	Set 5	Total	Report
19 Jul	16:00	Chinese Taipei	3–0	India	25–9	25–16	25–14			75–39	Report
19 Jul	18:00	Japan	3–0	Sri Lanka	25–5	25–18	25–19			75–42	Report
20 Jul	12:00	Sri Lanka	0–3	India	15–25	12–25	14–25			41–75	Report
20 Jul	14:00	Chinese Taipei	0–3	Japan	17–25	21–25	5–25			43–75	Report

=== Pool F ===
Pos	Team	Pld	W	L	Pts	SW	SL	SR	SPW	SPL	SPR	Qualification
1	China	3	3	0	9	9	1	9.000	244	144	1.694	Quarterfinals
2	Thailand	3	2	1	6	6	4	1.500	214	204	1.049	Quarterfinals
3	South Korea	3	1	2	3	5	6	0.833	234	238	0.983	Quarterfinals
4	Kazakhstan	3	0	3	0	0	9	0.000	119	225	0.529	Quarterfinals

Date	Time		Score		Set 1	Set 2	Set 3	Set 4	Set 5	Total	Report
19 Jul	12:00	China	3–1	South Korea	25–11	25–23	19–25	25–12		94–71	Report
19 Jul	14:00	Thailand	3–0	Kazakhstan	25–7	25–19	25–15			75–41	Report
20 Jul	16:00	Kazakhstan	0–3	South Korea	19–25	17–25	14–25			50–75	Report
20 Jul	18:00	China	3–0	Thailand	25–17	25–14	25–14			75–45	Report

=== Pool G ===
Pos	Team	Pld	W	L	Pts	SW	SL	SR	SPW	SPL	SPR	Qualification
1	Hong Kong	2	2	0	5	6	2	3.000	179	127	1.409	9th–12th places
2	Iran	2	1	1	4	5	4	1.250	181	192	0.943	9th–12th places
3	Turkmenistan	2	0	2	0	1	6	0.167	128	169	0.757	13th–15th places

Date	Time		Score		Set 1	Set 2	Set 3	Set 4	Set 5	Total	Report
19 Jul	12:00	Iran	3–1	Turkmenistan	19–25	25–18	25–22	25–23		94–88	Report
20 Jul	16:00	Iran	2–3	Hong Kong	22–25	6–25	25–21	25–18	9–15	87–104	Report

=== Pool H ===
Pos	Team	Pld	W	L	Pts	SW	SL	SR	SPW	SPL	SPR	Qualification
1	Vietnam	3	3	0	9	9	0	MAX	225	154	1.461	9th–12th places
2	New Zealand	3	2	1	6	6	4	1.500	226	204	1.108	9th–12th places
3	Australia	3	1	2	2	4	8	0.500	254	273	0.930	13th–15th places
4	Macau	3	0	3	1	2	9	0.222	185	259	0.714	13th–15th places

Date	Time		Score		Set 1	Set 2	Set 3	Set 4	Set 5	Total	Report
19 Jul	14:00	Vietnam	3–0	Macau	25–16	25–13	25–16			75–45	Report
19 Jul	16:00	Australia	1–3	New Zealand	21–25	19–25	27–25	20–25		87–100	Report
20 Jul	12:00	New Zealand	3–0	Macau	25–23	25–11	25–8			75–42	Report
20 Jul	14:00	Vietnam	3–0	Australia	25–18	25–18	25–22			75–58	Report

== Classification 13th–15th ==
13th–15th places
22 July – Taipei
Turkmenistan	1
Macau	3
22 July – Taipei
Australia
Bye

13th place
23 July – Taipei
Macau	0
Australia	3

=== Semifinals ===
Date	Time		Score		Set 1	Set 2	Set 3	Set 4	Set 5	Total	Report
22 Jul	12:00	Turkmenistan	1–3	Macau	22–25	22–25	25–18	26–28		95–96	Report

=== 13th place ===
Date	Time		Score		Set 1	Set 2	Set 3	Set 4	Set 5	Total	Report
23 Jul	12:00	Macau	0–3	Australia	18–25	13–25	16–25			47–75	Report

== Classification 9th–12th ==
9th–12th places
22 July – Taipei
Hong Kong	1
New Zealand	3
22 July – Taipei
Vietnam	3
Iran	0

9th place
23 July – Taipei
New Zealand	3
Vietnam	1
11th place
23 July – Taipei
Hong Kong	3
Iran	0

=== Semifinals ===
Date	Time		Score		Set 1	Set 2	Set 3	Set 4	Set 5	Total	Report
22 Jul	14:00	Hong Kong	1–3	New Zealand	15–25	25–17	17–25	17–25		74–92	Report
22 Jul	16:00	Vietnam	3–0	Iran	25–14	25–15	25–15			75–44	Report

=== 11th place ===
Date	Time		Score		Set 1	Set 2	Set 3	Set 4	Set 5	Total	Report
23 Jul	14:00	Hong Kong	3–0	Iran	25–22	25–13	25–22			75–57	Report

=== 9th place ===
Date	Time		Score		Set 1	Set 2	Set 3	Set 4	Set 5	Total	Report
23 Jul	16:00	New Zealand	3–1	Vietnam	26–24	20–25	25–20	25–12		96–81	Report

== Final round ==
Quarterfinals
22 July – Taipei
Chinese Taipei	1
South Korea	3
22 July – Taipei
China	3
Sri Lanka	0
22 July – Taipei
Japan	3
Kazakhstan	0
22 July – Taipei
Thailand	3
India	0

Semifinals
23 July – Taipei
South Korea	1
China	3
23 July – Taipei
Japan	3
Thailand	0

Final
24 July – Taipei
China	3
Japan	1
3rd place
24 July – Taipei
South Korea	3
Thailand	2

5th–8th places
23 July – Taipei
Chinese Taipei	3
Sri Lanka	0
23 July – Taipei
Kazakhstan	2
India	3

5th place
24 July – Taipei
Chinese Taipei	3
India	0
7th place
24 July – Taipei
Sri Lanka	0
Kazakhstan	3

=== Quarterfinals ===
Date	Time		Score		Set 1	Set 2	Set 3	Set 4	Set 5	Total	Report
22 Jul	12:00	Japan	3–0	Kazakhstan	25–5	25–17	25–18			75–40	Report
22 Jul	14:00	Chinese Taipei	1–3	South Korea	12–25	19–25	28–26	18–25		77–101	Report
22 Jul	16:00	China	3–0	Sri Lanka	25–9	25–11	25–6			75–26	Report
22 Jul	18:00	Thailand	3–0	India	25–12	25–16	25–9			75–37	Report

=== 5th–8th semifinals ===
Date	Time		Score		Set 1	Set 2	Set 3	Set 4	Set 5	Total	Report
23 Jul	12:00	Chinese Taipei	3–0	Sri Lanka	25–10	25–9	25–12			75–31	Report
23 Jul	14:00	Kazakhstan	2–3	India	25–21	9–25	25–19	19–25	12–15	90–105	Report

=== Semifinals ===
Date	Time		Score		Set 1	Set 2	Set 3	Set 4	Set 5	Total	Report
23 Jul	16:00	South Korea	1–3	China	25–22	28–30	18–25	19–25		90–102	Report
23 Jul	18:00	Japan	3–0	Thailand	25–12	25–21	25–17			75–50	Report

=== 7th place ===
Date	Time		Score		Set 1	Set 2	Set 3	Set 4	Set 5	Total	Report
24 Jul	11:00	Sri Lanka	0–3	Kazakhstan	18–25	16–25	22–25			56–75	Report

=== 5th place ===
Date	Time		Score		Set 1	Set 2	Set 3	Set 4	Set 5	Total	Report
24 Jul	13:00	Chinese Taipei	3–0	India	25–18	25–16	25–13			75–47	Report

=== 3rd place ===
Date	Time		Score		Set 1	Set 2	Set 3	Set 4	Set 5	Total	Report
24 Jul	15:00	South Korea	3–2	Thailand	25–20	23–25	25–20	18–25	15–7	106–97	Report

=== Final ===
Date	Time		Score		Set 1	Set 2	Set 3	Set 4	Set 5	Total	Report
24 Jul	17:00	China	3–1	Japan	13–25	25–21	25–20	25–19		88–85	Report

== Final standing ==
Rank	Team
1st place, gold medalist(s)	China
2nd place, silver medalist(s)	Japan
3rd place, bronze medalist(s)	South Korea
4	Thailand
5	Chinese Taipei
6	India
7	Kazakhstan
8	Sri Lanka
9	New Zealand
10	Vietnam
11	Hong Kong
12	Iran
13	Australia
14	Macau
15	Turkmenistan

Qualified for the 2015 World Junior Championship

2014 Asian Junior Women's champions

China
Eleventh title

Team roster
Sun Haiping, Hu Mingyuan, Lin Lin, Du Qingqing, Zhang Qian, Ju Wanrong, Gong Xiangyu, Rong Wanqianbai, Wang Yuanyuan, Meng Zixuan, Jin Ye, Huang Jiayi
Head Coach: Xu Jiande

== Awards ==
- MVP: (China) Du Qingqing
- Best setter: (South Korea) Lee Da-yeong
- Best outside spikers: (South Korea) Lee Jae-yeong and (China) Du Qingqing
- Best middle blockers: (China) Hu Mingyuan and (China) Zhang Qian
- Best opposite spiker: (Japan) Kaori Mabashi
- Best libero: (South Korea) Park Hea-mi

== See also ==
- List of sporting events in Taiwan
