= 1990 Asian Junior Women's Volleyball Championship =

1990 Asian Junior Women's Championship
Tournament details
- Host country: Thailand
- Dates: ?–10 December
- Teams: 14
- Venue: 1 (in 1 host city)

Final positions
- Champions: Japan (3rd title)

The 1990 Asian Junior Women's Volleyball Championship was held in Chiang Mai, Thailand from ? – December to 10 December 1990.

== Results ==
=== Championship ===
Semifinals
09 Dec – Chiang Mai
Japan	3
South Korea	1
09 Dec – Chiang Mai
China	3
Chinese Taipei	0

Final
10 Dec – Chiang Mai
Japan	3
China	?
3rd place
10 Dec – Chiang Mai
South Korea	3
Chinese Taipei	?

=== Semifinals ===
Date		Score		Set 1	Set 2	Set 3	Set 4	Set 5	Total
09 Dec	Japan	3–0	Chinese Taipei	15–8	14–3	15–0			45–11
09 Dec	South Korea	3–2	China	12–15	16–14	9–15	15–0	15–11	67–55

=== 3rd place ===
Date		Score		Set 1	Set 2	Set 3	Set 4	Set 5	Total
10 Dec	China	3–?	Chinese Taipei						

=== Final ===
Date		Score		Set 1	Set 2	Set 3	Set 4	Set 5	Total
10 Dec	Japan	3–?	South Korea						

== Final standing ==
Rank	Team
1st place, gold medalist(s)	Japan
2nd place, silver medalist(s)	South Korea
3rd place, bronze medalist(s)	China
4	Chinese Taipei
5	North Korea
6	Thailand
7	Australia
8	Indonesia
9	India
10	New Zealand
11	Malaysia
12	Hong Kong
13	Sri Lanka
14	Guam

Qualified for the 1991 World Junior Championship

1990 Asian Junior Women's champions

Japan
Fourth title
