= 2010 Asian Junior Women's Volleyball Championship =

2010 Asian Junior Women's Championship

Tournament details
- Host country: Vietnam
- Dates: 12–20 September
- Teams: 15
- Venues: 2 (in 1 host city)

Final positions
- Champions: China (9th title)

Tournament awards
- MVP: (China) Liu Yanhan

The 2010 Asian Junior Women's Volleyball Championship was held in Ho Chi Minh City, Vietnam from 12 September to 20 September 2010.

== Pools composition ==
The teams are seeded based on their final ranking at the 2008 Asian Junior Women's Volleyball Championship.

Pool A	Pool B	Pool C	Pool D
Vietnam (Host); Kazakhstan (7th); New Zealand	Japan (1st); Indonesia (6th); Hong Kong; Sri Lanka	Chinese Taipei (2nd); Thailand (5th); Fiji; India	China (3rd); South Korea (4th); Iran; Australia

== Preliminary round ==
=== Pool A ===
Pos	Team	Pld	W	L	Pts	SW	SL	SR	SPW	SPL	SPR	Qualification
1	Kazakhstan	2	2	0	4	6	0	MAX	150	93	1.613	Pool E
2	Vietnam	2	1	1	3	3	3	1.000	128	133	0.962	Pool E
3	New Zealand	2	0	2	2	0	6	0.000	98	150	0.653	Pool G

Date	Time		Score		Set 1	Set 2	Set 3	Set 4	Set 5	Total	Report
12 Sep	19:00	New Zealand	0–3	Vietnam	23–25	21–25	14–25			58–75	Report
13 Sep	15:00	Kazakhstan	3–0	New Zealand	25–19	25–13	25–8			75–40	Report
14 Sep	20:00	Vietnam	0–3	Kazakhstan	13–25	22–25	18–25			53–75	Report

=== Pool B ===
Pos	Team	Pld	W	L	Pts	SW	SL	SR	SPW	SPL	SPR	Qualification
1	Japan	3	3	0	6	9	0	MAX	225	95	2.368	Pool F
2	Indonesia	3	2	1	5	6	3	2.000	198	164	1.207	Pool F
3	Hong Kong	3	1	2	4	3	7	0.429	169	230	0.735	Pool H
4	Sri Lanka	3	0	3	3	1	9	0.111	143	246	0.581	Pool H

Date	Time		Score		Set 1	Set 2	Set 3	Set 4	Set 5	Total	Report
12 Sep	14:00	Hong Kong	3–1	Sri Lanka	25–22	25–19	21–25	25–14		96–80	Report
12 Sep	21:00	Indonesia	0–3	Japan	19–25	16–25	13–25			48–75	Report
13 Sep	18:00	Sri Lanka	0–3	Japan	7–25	9–25	8–25			24–75	Report
13 Sep	20:00	Hong Kong	0–3	Indonesia	17–25	11–25	22–25			50–75	Report
14 Sep	15:00	Japan	3–0	Hong Kong	25–7	25–5	25–11			75–23	Report
14 Sep	18:00	Indonesia	3–0	Sri Lanka	25–11	25–14	25–14			75–39	Report

=== Pool C ===
Pos	Team	Pld	W	L	Pts	SW	SL	SR	SPW	SPL	SPR	Qualification
1	Thailand	3	3	0	6	9	1	9.000	244	177	1.379	Pool E
2	Chinese Taipei	3	2	1	5	7	3	2.333	241	163	1.479	Pool E
3	India	3	1	2	4	3	6	0.500	181	193	0.938	Pool G
4	Fiji	3	0	3	3	0	9	0.000	92	225	0.409	Pool G

Date	Time		Score		Set 1	Set 2	Set 3	Set 4	Set 5	Total	Report
12 Sep	10:00	Fiji	0–3	Thailand	4–25	12–25	13–25			29–75	Report
12 Sep	12:00	India	0–3	Chinese Taipei	18–25	12–25	19–25			49–75	Report
13 Sep	13:00	Thailand	3–1	Chinese Taipei	25–15	30–28	13–25	25–23		93–91	Report
13 Sep	15:00	Fiji	0–3	India	8–25	12–25	22–25			42–75	Report
14 Sep	13:00	India	0–3	Thailand	16–25	24–26	17–25			57–76	Report
14 Sep	15:00	Chinese Taipei	3–0	Fiji	25–5	25–8	25–8			75–21	Report

=== Pool D ===
Pos	Team	Pld	W	L	Pts	SW	SL	SR	SPW	SPL	SPR	Qualification
1	China	3	3	0	6	9	1	9.000	247	160	1.544	Pool F
2	South Korea	3	2	1	5	7	4	1.750	247	210	1.176	Pool F
3	Iran	3	1	2	4	4	6	0.667	206	234	0.880	Pool H
4	Australia	3	0	3	3	0	9	0.000	129	225	0.573	Pool H

Date	Time		Score		Set 1	Set 2	Set 3	Set 4	Set 5	Total	Report
12 Sep	10:00	Iran	0–3	China	14–25	19–25	13–25			46–75	Report
12 Sep	12:00	South Korea	3–0	Australia	25–7	25–15	25–6			75–28	Report
13 Sep	18:00	China	3–0	Australia	25–12	25–7	25–21			75–40	Report
13 Sep	20:00	Iran	1–3	South Korea	23–25	17–25	25–23	20–25		85–98	Report
14 Sep	18:00	South Korea	1–3	China	17–25	25–22	12–25	20–25		74–97	Report
14 Sep	20:00	Australia	0–3	Iran	23–25	23–25	15–25			61–75	Report

== Classification round ==
- The results and the points of the matches between the same teams that were already played during the preliminary round shall be taken into account for the classification round.

=== Pool E ===
Pos	Team	Pld	W	L	Pts	SW	SL	SR	SPW	SPL	SPR	Qualification
1	Thailand	3	3	0	6	9	1	9.000	243	158	1.538	Quarterfinals
2	Chinese Taipei	3	2	1	5	7	3	2.333	241	191	1.262	Quarterfinals
3	Kazakhstan	3	1	2	4	3	6	0.500	162	203	0.798	Quarterfinals
4	Vietnam	3	0	3	3	0	9	0.000	131	225	0.582	Quarterfinals

Date	Time		Score		Set 1	Set 2	Set 3	Set 4	Set 5	Total	Report
15 Sep	18:00	Kazakhstan	0–3	Chinese Taipei	13–25	22–25	19–25			54–75	Report
15 Sep	20:00	Thailand	3–0	Vietnam	25–7	25–10	25–17			75–34	Report
16 Sep	18:00	Kazakhstan	0–3	Thailand	9–25	17–25	7–25			33–75	Report
16 Sep	20:00	Vietnam	0–3	Chinese Taipei	17–25	17–25	10–25			44–75	Report

=== Pool F ===
Pos	Team	Pld	W	L	Pts	SW	SL	SR	SPW	SPL	SPR	Qualification
1	Japan	3	3	0	6	9	0	MAX	226	159	1.421	Quarterfinals
2	China	3	2	1	5	6	4	1.500	229	190	1.205	Quarterfinals
3	South Korea	3	1	2	4	4	6	0.667	203	214	0.949	Quarterfinals
4	Indonesia	3	0	3	3	0	9	0.000	130	225	0.578	Quarterfinals

Date	Time		Score		Set 1	Set 2	Set 3	Set 4	Set 5	Total	Report
15 Sep	18:00	Japan	3–0	South Korea	25–18	26–24	25–12			76–54	Report
15 Sep	20:00	China	3–0	Indonesia	25–19	25–11	25–11			75–41	Report
16 Sep	18:00	Indonesia	0–3	South Korea	12–25	17–25	12–25			41–75	Report
16 Sep	20:00	Japan	3–0	China	25–19	25–19	25–19			75–57	Report

=== Pool G ===
Pos	Team	Pld	W	L	Pts	SW	SL	SR	SPW	SPL	SPR	Qualification
1	India	2	2	0	4	6	0	MAX	150	88	1.705	9th–12th place
2	New Zealand	2	1	1	3	3	3	1.000	121	125	0.968	9th–12th place
3	Fiji	2	0	2	2	0	6	0.000	92	150	0.613	13th–15th place

Date	Time		Score		Set 1	Set 2	Set 3	Set 4	Set 5	Total	Report
15 Sep	15:00	New Zealand	0–3	India	15–25	17–25	14–25			46–75	Report
16 Sep	15:00	Fiji	0–3	New Zealand	16–25	23–25	11–25			50–75	Report

=== Pool H ===
Pos	Team	Pld	W	L	Pts	SW	SL	SR	SPW	SPL	SPR	Qualification
1	Iran	3	3	0	6	9	0	MAX	225	155	1.452	9th–12th place
2	Australia	3	2	1	5	6	5	1.200	239	229	1.044	9th–12th place
3	Hong Kong	3	1	2	4	5	7	0.714	241	253	0.953	13th–15th place
4	Sri Lanka	3	0	3	3	1	9	0.111	183	251	0.729	13th–15th place

Date	Time		Score		Set 1	Set 2	Set 3	Set 4	Set 5	Total	Report
15 Sep	13:00	Hong Kong	2–3	Australia	25–21	24–26	20–25	25–11	8–15	102–98	Report
15 Sep	15:00	Iran	3–0	Sri Lanka	25–21	25–11	25–19			75–51	Report
16 Sep	13:00	Sri Lanka	0–3	Australia	8–25	28–30	16–25			52–80	Report
16 Sep	15:00	Hong Kong	0–3	Iran	9–25	16–25	18–25			43–75	Report

== Classification 13th–15th ==
13th–15th places
18 September – Ho Chi Minh City
Hong Kong
Bye
18 September – Ho Chi Minh City
Fiji	3
Sri Lanka	0

13th place
19 September – Ho Chi Minh City
Hong Kong	2
Fiji	3

=== Semifinals ===
Date	Time		Score		Set 1	Set 2	Set 3	Set 4	Set 5	Total	Report
18 Sep	15:00	Fiji	3–0	Sri Lanka	25–19	25–22	25–22			75–63	Report

=== 13th place ===
Date	Time		Score		Set 1	Set 2	Set 3	Set 4	Set 5	Total	Report
19 Sep	15:00	Hong Kong	2–3	Fiji	20–25	24–26	26–24	25–19	12–15	107–109	Report

== Classification 9th–12th ==
9th–12th places
18 September – Ho Chi Minh City
India	3
Australia	2
18 September – Ho Chi Minh City
Iran	3
New Zealand	0

9th place
19 September – Ho Chi Minh City
India	0
Iran	3
11th place
19 September – Ho Chi Minh City
Australia	3
New Zealand	1

=== Semifinals ===
Date	Time		Score		Set 1	Set 2	Set 3	Set 4	Set 5	Total	Report
18 Sep	13:00	India	3–2	Australia	26–24	17–25	12–25	25–12	15–11	95–97	Report
18 Sep	15:00	Iran	3–0	New Zealand	25–13	25–19	25–13			75–45	Report

=== 11th place ===
Date	Time		Score		Set 1	Set 2	Set 3	Set 4	Set 5	Total	Report
19 Sep	13:00	Australia	3–1	New Zealand	25–18	16–25	25–19	25–22		91–84	Report

=== 9th place ===
Date	Time		Score		Set 1	Set 2	Set 3	Set 4	Set 5	Total	Report
19 Sep	15:00	India	0–3	Iran	25–27	16–25	15–25			56–77	Report

== Final round ==
Quarterfinals
18 September – Ho Chi Minh City
Thailand	3
Indonesia	0
18 September – Ho Chi Minh City
China	3
Kazakhstan	0
18 September – Ho Chi Minh City
Japan	3
Vietnam	0
18 September – Ho Chi Minh City
Chinese Taipei	0
South Korea	3

Semifinals
19 September – Ho Chi Minh City
Thailand	0
China	3
19 September – Ho Chi Minh City
Japan	1
South Korea	3

Final
20 September – Ho Chi Minh City
China	3
South Korea	0
3rd place
20 September – Ho Chi Minh City
Thailand	0
Japan	3

5th–8th places
19 September – Ho Chi Minh City
Indonesia	1
Kazakhstan	3
19 September – Ho Chi Minh City
Vietnam	0
Chinese Taipei	3

5th place
20 September – Ho Chi Minh City
Kazakhstan	0
Chinese Taipei	3
7th place
20 September – Ho Chi Minh City
Indonesia	3
Vietnam	0

=== Quarterfinals ===
Date	Time		Score		Set 1	Set 2	Set 3	Set 4	Set 5	Total	Report
18 Sep	18:00	Thailand	3–0	Indonesia	25–17	25–21	25–10			75–48	Report
18 Sep	18:00	Chinese Taipei	0–3	South Korea	13–25	24–26	20–25			57–76	Report
18 Sep	20:00	Japan	3–0	Vietnam	25–10	25–17	25–8			75–35	Report
18 Sep	20:00	China	3–0	Kazakhstan	25–11	25–16	25–12			75–39	Report

=== 5th–8th semifinals ===
Date	Time		Score		Set 1	Set 2	Set 3	Set 4	Set 5	Total	Report
19 Sep	18:00	Indonesia	1–3	Kazakhstan	24–26	25–21	15–25	20–25		84–97	Report
19 Sep	20:00	Vietnam	0–3	Chinese Taipei	12–25	9–25	16–25			37–75	Report

=== Semifinals ===
Date	Time		Score		Set 1	Set 2	Set 3	Set 4	Set 5	Total	Report
19 Sep	18:00	Thailand	0–3	China	11–25	23–25	21–25			55–75	Report
19 Sep	20:00	Japan	1–3	South Korea	25–23	22–25	17–25	22–25		86–98	Report

=== 7th place ===
Date	Time		Score		Set 1	Set 2	Set 3	Set 4	Set 5	Total	Report
20 Sep	13:00	Indonesia	3–0	Vietnam	25–16	25–19	25–13			75–48	Report

=== 5th place ===
Date	Time		Score		Set 1	Set 2	Set 3	Set 4	Set 5	Total	Report
20 Sep	15:00	Kazakhstan	0–3	Chinese Taipei	17–25	21–25	18–25			56–75	Report

=== 3rd place ===
Date	Time		Score		Set 1	Set 2	Set 3	Set 4	Set 5	Total	Report
20 Sep	18:00	Thailand	0–3	Japan	22–25	17–25	24–26			63–76	Report

=== Final ===
Date	Time		Score		Set 1	Set 2	Set 3	Set 4	Set 5	Total	Report
20 Sep	20:00	China	3–0	South Korea	25–18	25–21	25–17			75–56	Report

== Final standing ==
Rank	Team
1st place, gold medalist(s)	China
2nd place, silver medalist(s)	South Korea
3rd place, bronze medalist(s)	Japan
4	Thailand
5	Chinese Taipei
6	Kazakhstan
7	Indonesia
8	Vietnam
9	Iran
10	India
11	Australia
12	New Zealand
13	Fiji
14	Hong Kong
15	Sri Lanka

Qualified for the 2011 World Junior Championship

2010 Asian Junior Women's champions

China
Ninth title

Team Roster

Liu Yanhan, Liu Mingjuan, Yang Jie, Wu Bei, Zhang Xiaoya, Zhang Zhongyu, Huang Liuyan, Jiang Qianwen, Lin Li, Yang Zhou, Wang Qi, Wang Ning

Head Coach: Xu Jiande

== Awards ==
- MVP: (China) Liu Yanhan
- Best scorer: (South Korea) Park Jeong-ah
- Best spiker: (Japan) Mari Horikawa
- Best blocker: (China) Yang Zhou
- Best server: (Japan) Mari Horikawa
- Best setter: (China) Wu Bei
- Best libero: (Japan) Sumiko Mori
- Miss Volleyball: (Japan) Azusa Futami
