= 2002 Asian Junior Women's Volleyball Championship =

2002 Asian Junior Women's Championship
Tournament details
- Host country: Vietnam
- Dates: 1–8 September
- Teams: 12
- Venue: 1 (in 1 host city)

Final positions
- Champions: China (6th title)

The 2002 Asian Junior Women's Volleyball Championship was held in Ho Chi Minh City, Vietnam from 1 September to 8 September 2002.

== Pools composition ==
The teams are seeded based on their final ranking at the 2000 Asian Junior Women's Volleyball Championship.

Pool A	Pool B
Vietnam (Host); South Korea (3rd); Chinese Taipei; Australia; India; Philippines	China (1st); Japan (2nd); Thailand; Kazakhstan; Indonesia; New Zealand

== Preliminary round ==
=== Pool A ===
Pos	Team	Pld	W	L	Pts	SW	SL	SR	SPW	SPL	SPR	Qualification
1	Chinese Taipei	5	5	0	10	0	0	—	0	0	—	Final round
2	South Korea	5	4	1	9	0	0	—	0	0	—	Final round
3	Vietnam	5	3	2	8	0	0	—	0	0	—	5th–8th classification
4	India	5	2	3	7	0	0	—	0	0	—	5th–8th classification
5	Australia	5	1	4	6	5	12	0.417	276	373	0.740	9th–12th classification
6	Philippines	5	0	5	5	0	0	—	0	0	—	9th–12th classification

Date		Score		Set 1	Set 2	Set 3	Set 4	Set 5	Total
01 Sep	Australia	0–3	Chinese Taipei	5–25	10–25	10–25			25–75
02 Sep	Philippines	0–3	Australia	15–25	17–25	10–25			42–75
03 Sep	South Korea	3–0	Australia	25–16	25–6	25–7			75–29
04 Sep	India	3–2	Australia	23–25	25–21	25–22	18–25	15–9	106–102
05 Sep	Australia	0–3	Vietnam	15–25	21–25	9–25			45–75

=== Pool B ===
Pos	Team	Pld	W	L	Pts	SW	SL	SR	SPW	SPL	SPR	Qualification
1	China	5	5	0	10	0	0	—	0	0	—	Final round
2	Thailand	5	4	1	9	0	0	—	0	0	—	Final round
3	Japan	5	3	2	8	0	0	—	0	0	—	5th–8th classification
4	Kazakhstan	5	2	3	7	0	0	—	0	0	—	5th–8th classification
5	Indonesia	5	1	4	6	0	0	—	0	0	—	9th–12th classification
6	New Zealand	5	0	5	5	0	0	—	0	0	—	9th–12th classification

== Classification 9th–12th ==
9th–12th places
7 September – Ho Chi Minh City
Australia	2
New Zealand	3
7 September – Ho Chi Minh City
Indonesia	3
Philippines	0

9th place
8 September – Ho Chi Minh City
New Zealand	?
Indonesia	3
11th place
8 September – Ho Chi Minh City
Australia	3
Philippines	0

=== Semifinals ===
Date		Score		Set 1	Set 2	Set 3	Set 4	Set 5	Total
07 Sep	Australia	2–3	New Zealand	25–16	25–7	17–25	23–25	6–15	96–88
07 Sep	Indonesia	3–0	Philippines						

=== 11th place ===
Date		Score		Set 1	Set 2	Set 3	Set 4	Set 5	Total
08 Sep	Australia	3–0	Philippines	25–5	25–20	25–17			75–42

=== 9th place ===
Date		Score		Set 1	Set 2	Set 3	Set 4	Set 5	Total
08 Sep	New Zealand	?–3	Indonesia						

== Final standing ==
Rank	Team
1st place, gold medalist(s)	China
2nd place, silver medalist(s)	Thailand
3rd place, bronze medalist(s)	Chinese Taipei
4	South Korea
5	Japan
6	Vietnam
7	Kazakhstan
8	India
9	Indonesia
10	New Zealand
11	Australia
12	Philippines

Qualified for the 2003 World Junior Championship

2002 Asian Junior Women's champions

China
Sixth title
