= 2012 Asian Junior Women's Volleyball Championship =

2012 Asian Junior Women's Championship
- women

Tournament details
- Host country: Thailand
- Dates: 1–9 October
- Teams: 16
- Venues: 2 (in 2 host cities)

Final positions
- Champions: China (10th title)

Tournament awards
- MVP: (China) Zhu Ting

The 2012 Asian Junior Women's Volleyball Championship was held in Nakhon Pathom and Ratchaburi, Thailand from 1 – 9 October 2012.

== Venues ==
- Nakhon Pathom Sports Center Gymnasium, Nakhon Pathom – Pool B, D, E, G and Final Round
- Ratchaburi Gymnasium, Ratchaburi – Pool A, C, F, H and Final Round

== Pools composition ==
The teams are seeded based on their final ranking at the 2010 Asian Junior Women's Volleyball Championship.

Pool A	Pool B	Pool C	Pool D
Thailand (Host & 4th); Iran (9th); New Zealand; Turkmenistan * Kuwait	China (1st); Vietnam (8th); Mongolia; India	South Korea (2nd); Kazakhstan (6th); Hong Kong; Sri Lanka	Japan (3rd); Chinese Taipei (5th); Australia; ~~Malaysia~~ *

* Malaysia withdrew, Turkmenistan replaced Malaysia in Pool D to balance the number of teams in each group.

== Preliminary round ==
=== Pool A ===
Pos	Team	Pld	W	L	Pts	SW	SL	SR	SPW	SPL	SPR	Qualification
1	Thailand	3	3	0	9	9	0	MAX	225	71	3.169	Pool E
2	Iran	3	2	1	6	6	3	2.000	172	135	1.274	Pool E
3	New Zealand	3	1	2	3	3	6	0.500	164	165	0.994	Pool G
4	Kuwait	3	0	3	0	0	9	0.000	35	225	0.156	Pool G

Date	Time		Score		Set 1	Set 2	Set 3	Set 4	Set 5	Total	Report
01 Oct	12:00	New Zealand	3–0	Kuwait	25–5	25–8	25–2			75–15	Report
01 Oct	18:00	Thailand	3–0	Iran	25–8	25–4	25–10			75–22	Report
02 Oct	14:00	Iran	3–0	Kuwait	25–4	25–6	25–1			75–11	Report
02 Oct	18:00	New Zealand	0–3	Thailand	16–25	19–25	5–25			40–75	Report
03 Oct	16:00	New Zealand	0–3	Iran	11–25	16–25	22–25			49–75	Report
03 Oct	18:00	Thailand	3–0	Kuwait	25–3	25–2	25–4			75–9	Report

=== Pool B ===
Pos	Team	Pld	W	L	Pts	SW	SL	SR	SPW	SPL	SPR	Qualification
1	China	3	3	0	9	9	0	MAX	225	81	2.778	Pool F
2	India	3	2	1	6	6	4	1.500	198	191	1.037	Pool F
3	Vietnam	3	1	2	3	3	7	0.429	183	220	0.832	Pool H
4	Mongolia	3	0	3	0	2	9	0.222	155	269	0.576	Pool H

Date	Time		Score		Set 1	Set 2	Set 3	Set 4	Set 5	Total	Report
01 Oct	12:00	Mongolia	0–3	China	9–25	10–25	7–25			26–75	Report
01 Oct	14:00	India	3–0	Vietnam	25–19	25–20	25–18			75–57	Report
02 Oct	12:00	Mongolia	1–3	India	7–25	26–24	5–25	21–25		59–99	Report
02 Oct	18:00	China	3–0	Vietnam	25–12	25–12	25–7			75–31	Report
03 Oct	14:00	India	0–3	China	9–25	7–25	8–25			24–75	Report
03 Oct	16:00	Mongolia	1–3	Vietnam	25–20	20–25	14–25	11–25		70–95	Report

=== Pool C ===
Pos	Team	Pld	W	L	Pts	SW	SL	SR	SPW	SPL	SPR	Qualification
1	South Korea	3	3	0	9	9	1	9.000	248	151	1.642	Pool E
2	Kazakhstan	3	2	1	6	6	4	1.500	222	201	1.104	Pool E
3	Hong Kong	3	1	2	3	4	6	0.667	195	241	0.809	Pool G
4	Sri Lanka	3	0	3	0	1	9	0.111	180	252	0.714	Pool G

Date	Time		Score		Set 1	Set 2	Set 3	Set 4	Set 5	Total	Report
01 Oct	14:00	Hong Kong	0–3	Kazakhstan	21–25	14–25	16–25			51–75	Report
01 Oct	16:00	South Korea	3–0	Sri Lanka	25–16	25–9	25–12			75–37	Report
02 Oct	12:00	Kazakhstan	3–1	Sri Lanka	25–11	25–19	26–28	25–17		101–75	Report
02 Oct	16:00	Hong Kong	1–3	South Korea	12–25	14–25	25–23	17–25		68–98	Report
03 Oct	12:00	Hong Kong	3–0	Sri Lanka	25–22	26–24	25–22			76–68	Report
03 Oct	14:00	South Korea	3–0	Kazakhstan	25–17	25–12	25–17			75–46	Report

=== Pool D ===
Pos	Team	Pld	W	L	Pts	SW	SL	SR	SPW	SPL	SPR	Qualification
1	Chinese Taipei	3	3	0	8	9	3	3.000	280	186	1.505	Pool F
2	Japan	3	2	1	7	8	3	2.667	252	173	1.457	Pool F
3	Australia	3	1	2	3	4	6	0.667	185	204	0.907	Pool H
4	Turkmenistan	3	0	3	0	0	9	0.000	71	225	0.316	Pool H

Date	Time		Score		Set 1	Set 2	Set 3	Set 4	Set 5	Total	Report
01 Oct	16:00	Turkmenistan	0–3	Chinese Taipei	8–25	8–25	5–25			21–75	Report
01 Oct	18:00	Japan	3–0	Australia	25–17	25–15	25–15			75–47	Report
02 Oct	14:00	Chinese Taipei	3–1	Australia	25–10	25–13	20–25	25–15		95–63	Report
02 Oct	16:00	Turkmenistan	0–3	Japan	2–25	2–25	12–25			16–75	Report
03 Oct	12:00	Turkmenistan	0–3	Australia	12–25	11–25	11–25			34–75	Report
03 Oct	18:00	Japan	2–3	Chinese Taipei	29–27	19–25	25–18	21–25	8–15	102–110	Report

== Classification round ==
- The results and the points of the matches between the same teams that were already played during the preliminary round shall be taken into account for the classification round.

=== Pool E ===
Pos	Team	Pld	W	L	Pts	SW	SL	SR	SPW	SPL	SPR	Qualification
1	Thailand	3	3	0	9	9	1	9.000	249	145	1.717	Quarterfinals
2	South Korea	3	2	1	6	7	3	2.333	232	187	1.241	Quarterfinals
3	Iran	3	1	2	3	3	7	0.429	154	238	0.647	Quarterfinals
4	Kazakhstan	3	0	3	0	1	9	0.111	175	240	0.729	Quarterfinals

Date	Time		Score		Set 1	Set 2	Set 3	Set 4	Set 5	Total	Report
05 Oct	16:00	Thailand	3–0	Kazakhstan	25–18	25–11	25–12			75–41	Report
05 Oct	18:00	South Korea	3–0	Iran	25–9	25–14	25–19			75–42	Report
06 Oct	16:00	Iran	3–1	Kazakhstan	15–25	25–23	25–22	25–18		90–88	Report
06 Oct	18:00	Thailand	3–1	South Korea	25–20	24–26	25–23	25–13		99–82	Report

=== Pool F ===
Pos	Team	Pld	W	L	Pts	SW	SL	SR	SPW	SPL	SPR	Qualification
1	China	3	3	0	9	9	0	MAX	225	108	2.083	Quarterfinals
2	Chinese Taipei	3	2	1	5	6	5	1.200	231	225	1.027	Quarterfinals
3	Japan	3	1	2	4	5	6	0.833	215	217	0.991	Quarterfinals
4	India	3	0	3	0	0	9	0.000	104	225	0.462	Quarterfinals

Date	Time		Score		Set 1	Set 2	Set 3	Set 4	Set 5	Total	Report
05 Oct	16:00	China	3–0	Japan	25–13	25–14	25–11			75–38	Report
05 Oct	18:00	Chinese Taipei	3–0	India	25–17	25–13	25–18			75–48	Report
06 Oct	16:00	India	0–3	Japan	14–25	8–25	10–25			32–75	Report
06 Oct	18:00	China	3–0	Chinese Taipei	25–9	25–15	25–22			75–46	Report

=== Pool G ===
Pos	Team	Pld	W	L	Pts	SW	SL	SR	SPW	SPL	SPR	Qualification
1	New Zealand	3	3	0	9	9	0	MAX	226	124	1.823	9th–12th places
2	Hong Kong	3	2	1	6	6	3	2.000	198	154	1.286	9th–12th places
3	Sri Lanka	3	1	2	3	3	6	0.500	205	176	1.165	13th–16th places
4	Kuwait	3	0	3	0	0	9	0.000	50	225	0.222	13th–16th places

Date	Time		Score		Set 1	Set 2	Set 3	Set 4	Set 5	Total	Report
05 Oct	12:00	New Zealand	3–0	Sri Lanka	25–20	26–24	25–18			76–62	Report
05 Oct	14:00	Hong Kong	3–0	Kuwait	25–3	25–3	25–5			75–11	Report
06 Oct	12:00	Kuwait	0–3	Sri Lanka	6–25	5–25	13–25			24–75	Report
06 Oct	14:00	New Zealand	3–0	Hong Kong	25–19	25–10	25–18			75–47	Report

=== Pool H ===
Pos	Team	Pld	W	L	Pts	SW	SL	SR	SPW	SPL	SPR	Qualification
1	Australia	3	3	0	9	9	2	4.500	270	196	1.378	9th–12th places
2	Vietnam	3	2	1	6	7	4	1.750	257	198	1.298	9th–12th places
3	Mongolia	3	1	2	3	5	6	0.833	220	240	0.917	13th–16th places
4	Turkmenistan	3	0	3	0	0	9	0.000	112	225	0.498	13th–16th places

Date	Time		Score		Set 1	Set 2	Set 3	Set 4	Set 5	Total	Report
05 Oct	12:00	Vietnam	3–0	Turkmenistan	25–12	25–11	25–8			75–31	Report
05 Oct	14:00	Australia	3–1	Mongolia	23–25	25–14	25–17	25–19		98–75	Report
06 Oct	12:00	Mongolia	3–0	Turkmenistan	25–11	25–22	25–14			75–47	Report
06 Oct	14:00	Vietnam	1–3	Australia	17–25	25–21	21–25	24–26		87–97	Report

== Classification 13th–16th ==
13th–16th places
7 October – Ratchaburi
Sri Lanka	3
Turkmenistan	0
7 October – Ratchaburi
Mongolia	3
Kuwait	0

13th place
8 October – Ratchaburi
Sri Lanka	3
Mongolia	1
15th place
8 October – Ratchaburi
Turkmenistan	3
Kuwait	0

=== Semifinals ===
Date	Time		Score		Set 1	Set 2	Set 3	Set 4	Set 5	Total	Report
07 Oct	12:00	Sri Lanka	3–0	Turkmenistan	25–15	25–17	25–22			75–54	Report
07 Oct	14:00	Mongolia	3–0	Kuwait	25–6	25–2	25–7			75–15	Report

=== 15th place ===
Date	Time		Score		Set 1	Set 2	Set 3	Set 4	Set 5	Total	Report
08 Oct	10:00	Turkmenistan	3–0	Kuwait	25–10	25–3	25–11			75–24	Report

=== 13th place ===
Date	Time		Score		Set 1	Set 2	Set 3	Set 4	Set 5	Total	Report
08 Oct	12:00	Sri Lanka	3–1	Mongolia	25–20	25–19	16–25	26–24		92–88	Report

== Classification 9th–12th ==
9th–12th places
7 October – Ratchaburi
New Zealand	2
Vietnam	3
7 October – Ratchaburi
Australia	3
Hong Kong	0

9th place
8 October – Ratchaburi
Vietnam	0
Australia	3
11th place
8 October – Ratchaburi
New Zealand	0
Hong Kong	3

=== Semifinals ===
Date	Time		Score		Set 1	Set 2	Set 3	Set 4	Set 5	Total	Report
07 Oct	16:00	New Zealand	2–3	Vietnam	22–25	14–25	25–22	25–20	4–15	90–107	Report
07 Oct	18:00	Australia	3–0	Hong Kong	25–14	25–9	25–17			75–40	Report

=== 11th place ===
Date	Time		Score		Set 1	Set 2	Set 3	Set 4	Set 5	Total	Report
08 Oct	15:00	New Zealand	0–3	Hong Kong	14–25	18–25	20–25			52–75	Report

=== 9th place ===
Date	Time		Score		Set 1	Set 2	Set 3	Set 4	Set 5	Total	Report
08 Oct	17:00	Vietnam	0–3	Australia	22–25	16–25	12–25			50–75	Report

== Final round ==
Quarterfinals
7 October – Nakhon Pathom
China	3
Kazakhstan	0
7 October – Nakhon Pathom
South Korea	1
Japan	3
7 October – Nakhon Pathom
Thailand	3
India	0
7 October – Nakhon Pathom
Chinese Taipei	3
Iran	0

Semifinals
8 October – Nakhon Pathom
China	3
Japan	1
8 October – Nakhon Pathom
Thailand	1
Chinese Taipei	3

Final
9 October – Nakhon Pathom
China	3
Chinese Taipei	0
3rd place
9 October – Nakhon Pathom
Japan	3
Thailand	2

5th–8th places
8 October – Nakhon Pathom
Kazakhstan	2
South Korea	3
8 October – Nakhon Pathom
India	3
Iran	0

5th place
9 October – Ratchaburi
South Korea	3
India	0
7th place
9 October – Ratchaburi
Kazakhstan	3
Iran	2

=== Quarterfinals ===
Date	Time		Score		Set 1	Set 2	Set 3	Set 4	Set 5	Total	Report
07 Oct	12:00	China	3–0	Kazakhstan	25–12	25–4	25–16			75–32	Report
07 Oct	14:00	South Korea	1–3	Japan	18–25	25–17	19–25	23–25		85–92	Report
07 Oct	16:00	Chinese Taipei	3–0	Iran	25–17	25–16	25–17			75–50	Report
07 Oct	18:00	Thailand	3–0	India	25–13	25–21	25–15			75–49	Report

=== 5th–8th semifinals ===
Date	Time		Score		Set 1	Set 2	Set 3	Set 4	Set 5	Total	Report
08 Oct	10:00	Kazakhstan	2–3	South Korea	25–22	25–20	20–25	19–25	6–15	95–107	Report
08 Oct	12:00	Iran	0–3	India	18–25	8–25	15–25			41–75	Report

=== Semifinals ===
Date	Time		Score		Set 1	Set 2	Set 3	Set 4	Set 5	Total	Report
08 Oct	15:00	Thailand	1–3	Chinese Taipei	27–25	10–25	16–25	18–25		71–100	Report
08 Oct	17:00	China	3–1	Japan	25–17	18–25	25–21	25–22		93–85	Report

=== 7th place ===
Date	Time		Score		Set 1	Set 2	Set 3	Set 4	Set 5	Total	Report
09 Oct	11:00	Kazakhstan	3–2	Iran	23–25	25–19	19–25	27–25	16–14	110–108	Report

=== 5th place ===
Date	Time		Score		Set 1	Set 2	Set 3	Set 4	Set 5	Total	Report
09 Oct	13:00	South Korea	3–0	India	25–23	25–12	25–19			75–54	Report

=== 3rd place ===
Date	Time		Score		Set 1	Set 2	Set 3	Set 4	Set 5	Total	Report
09 Oct	12:00	Japan	3–2	Thailand	25–22	20–25	23–25	25–18	15–11	108–101	Report

=== Final ===
Date	Time		Score		Set 1	Set 2	Set 3	Set 4	Set 5	Total	Report
09 Oct	15:00	China	3–0	Chinese Taipei	25–18	25–15	25–9			75–42	Report

== Final standing ==
Rank	Team
1st place, gold medalist(s)	China
2nd place, silver medalist(s)	Chinese Taipei
3rd place, bronze medalist(s)	Japan
4	Thailand
5	South Korea
6	India
7	Kazakhstan
8	Iran
9	Australia
10	Vietnam
11	Hong Kong
12	New Zealand
13	Sri Lanka
14	Mongolia
15	Turkmenistan
16	Kuwait

Qualified for the 2013 World Junior Championship

2012 Asian Junior Women's champions

China
Tenth title

Team Roster

Wang Ning, Zheng Yixin, Chen Jiao, Zhu Ting, Tang Ningya, Chen Xintong, Li Weiwei, Huang Liuyan, Zhao Xiyu, Xu Ruayo, Wang Fengjiao, Yang Fangxu

Head Coach: Xu Jiande

== Awards ==
- MVP: (China) Zhu Ting
- Best scorer: (Thailand) Kuttika Kaewpin
- Best spiker: (China) Zhu Ting
- Best blocker: (China) Zheng Yixin
- Best server: (China) Tang Ningya
- Best setter: (Japan) Yuki Yamagami
- Best libero: (Chinese Taipei) Huang Shih-ting
