= 1998 Asian Junior Women's Volleyball Championship =

1998 Asian Junior Women's Championship
Tournament details
- Host country: Thailand
- Dates: 22–29 September
- Teams: 10
- Venue: 1 (in 1 host city)

Final positions
- Champions: China (4th title)

The 1998 Asian Junior Women's Volleyball Championship was held in Trang, Thailand from 22 – September to 29 September 1998

== Pools composition ==
The teams are seeded based on their final ranking at the 1996 Asian Junior Women's Volleyball Championship.

Pool A	Pool B
Thailand (Host); South Korea; Chinese Taipei; Malaysia; Sri Lanka	China; Japan; Australia; Vietnam; Singapore; ~~Indonesia~~ *

* Withdrew

== Preliminary round ==
=== Pool A ===
Pos	Team	Pld	W	L	Pts	SW	SL	SR	SPW	SPL	SPR	Qualification
1	South Korea	4	4	0	8	12	0	MAX	0	0	—	Semifinals
2	Thailand	4	3	1	7	9	4	2.250	0	0	—	Semifinals
3	Chinese Taipei	4	2	2	6	6	6	1.000	0	0	—	
4	Malaysia	4	1	3	5	3	9	0.333	0	0	—	
5	Sri Lanka	4	0	4	4	0	12	0.000	0	0	—	

Date		Score		Set 1	Set 2	Set 3	Set 4	Set 5	Total
22 Sep	Thailand	3–1	Chinese Taipei	15–7	15–1	12–15	15–8		24–31
22 Sep	South Korea	3–0	Malaysia						
23 Sep	Chinese Taipei	3–?	Malaysia						
23 Sep	Thailand	3–0	Sri Lanka						
24 Sep	Malaysia	3–?	Sri Lanka						
24 Sep	South Korea	3–?	Chinese Taipei						
25 Sep	South Korea	3–0	Sri Lanka						
25 Sep	Thailand	3–?	Malaysia						
26 Sep	Chinese Taipei	3–?	Sri Lanka						
26 Sep	South Korea	3–0	Thailand	15–5	15–0	15–3			45–5

=== Pool B ===
Pos	Team	Pld	W	L	Pts	SW	SL	SR	SPW	SPL	SPR	Qualification
1	China	4	4	0	8	12	0	MAX	0	0	—	Semifinals
2	Japan	4	3	1	7	9	4	2.250	0	0	—	Semifinals
3	Australia	4	2	2	6	7	6	1.167	0	0	—	
4	Vietnam	4	1	3	5	3	9	0.333	0	0	—	
5	Singapore	4	0	4	4	0	12	0.000	0	0	—	

Date		Score		Set 1	Set 2	Set 3	Set 4	Set 5	Total
22 Sep	Australia	3–?	Singapore						
22 Sep	China	3–0	Vietnam	15–1	15–1	15–3			45–5
23 Sep	Australia	3–?	Vietnam						
23 Sep	China	3–0	Japan	15–9	15–4	15–3			45–16
24 Sep	Malaysia	3–0	Singapore	15–3	15–0	15–0			45–3
24 Sep	China	3–?	Australia						
25 Sep	Vietnam	3–?	Singapore						
25 Sep	Japan	3–1	Australia	12–15	15–3	15–3	15–2		57–23
26 Sep	China	3–0	Singapore	15–1	15–1	15–1			45–3
26 Sep	Japan	3–0	Vietnam	15–5	15–0	15–3			45–5

== Final round ==
=== Classification 5th–8th ===
5th–8th places
28 Sep – Trang
Chinese Taipei	3
Vietnam	?
28 Sep – Trang
Australia	3
Malaysia	?

5th place
29 Sep – Trang
Chinese Taipei	3
Australia	?
7th place
29 Sep – Trang
Vietnam	3
Vietnam	?

=== Championship ===
Semifinals
28 Sep – Trang
South Korea	3
Japan	0
28 Sep – Trang
China	3
Thailand	?

Final
29 Sep – Trang
China	3
South Korea	0
3rd place
29 Sep – Trang
Japan	3
Thailand	1

=== 5th–8th semifinals ===
Date		Score		Set 1	Set 2	Set 3	Set 4	Set 5	Total
28 Sep	Chinese Taipei	3–?	Vietnam						
28 Sep	Australia	3–?	Malaysia						

=== Semifinals ===
Date		Score		Set 1	Set 2	Set 3	Set 4	Set 5	Total
28 Sep	South Korea	3–0	Japan	15–7	16–14	15–6			46–27
28 Sep	China	3–?	Thailand						

=== 9th place ===
Date		Score		Set 1	Set 2	Set 3	Set 4	Set 5	Total
28 Sep	Singapore	3–?	Sri Lanka						

=== 7th place ===
Date		Score		Set 1	Set 2	Set 3	Set 4	Set 5	Total
29 Sep	Vietnam	3–?	Malaysia						

=== 5th place ===
Date		Score		Set 1	Set 2	Set 3	Set 4	Set 5	Total
29 Sep	Chinese Taipei	3–?	Australia						

=== 3rd place ===
Date		Score		Set 1	Set 2	Set 3	Set 4	Set 5	Total
29 Sep	Japan	3–1	Thailand	12–15	15–11	15–7	15–7		57–40

=== Final ===
Date		Score		Set 1	Set 2	Set 3	Set 4	Set 5	Total
29 Sep	China	3–0	South Korea	15–4	15–5	15–5			45–14

== Final standing ==
Rank	Team
1st place, gold medalist(s)	China
2nd place, silver medalist(s)	South Korea
3rd place, bronze medalist(s)	Japan
4	Thailand
5	Chinese Taipei
6	Australia
7	Vietnam
8	Malaysia
9	Singapore
10	Sri Lanka

Qualified for the 1999 World Junior Championship

1998 Asian Junior Women's champions

China
Fourth title
