= 2006 Asian Junior Women's Volleyball Championship =

2006 Asian Junior Women's Championship
Tournament details
- Host country: Thailand
- Dates: 1–9 October
- Teams: 12
- Venue: 1 (in 1 host city)

Final positions
- Champions: China (8th title)

Tournament awards
- MVP: (China) Yan Ni

The 2006 Asian Junior Women's Volleyball Championship was held in Nakhon Ratchasima, Thailand from 1 October to 9 October 2006.

== Pools composition ==
The teams are seeded based on their final ranking at the 2004 Asian Junior Women's Volleyball Championship.

Pool A	Pool B	Pool C	Pool D
Thailand (Host & 5th); Sri Lanka (8th); New Zealand	China (1st); India (7th); Vietnam	Japan (2nd); Australia (6th); Singapore	South Korea (3rd); Chinese Taipei (4th); ~~Tajikistan~~ * Indonesia

* Withdrew

== Preliminary round ==
=== Pool A ===
Pos	Team	Pld	W	L	Pts	SW	SL	SR	SPW	SPL	SPR	Qualification
1	Thailand	2	2	0	4	6	0	MAX	150	60	2.500	Pool E
2	New Zealand	2	1	1	3	3	4	0.750	131	159	0.824	Pool E
3	Sri Lanka	2	0	2	2	1	6	0.167	111	173	0.642	Pool G

Date	Time		Score		Set 1	Set 2	Set 3	Set 4	Set 5	Total
01 Oct	15:00	Thailand	3–0	Sri Lanka	25–11	25–7	25–9			75–27
02 Oct	15:00	New Zealand	0–3	Thailand	13–25	9–25	11–25			33–75
03 Oct	15:00	Sri Lanka	1–3	New Zealand	21–25	25–23	15–25	23–25		84–98

=== Pool B ===
Pos	Team	Pld	W	L	Pts	SW	SL	SR	SPW	SPL	SPR	Qualification
1	China	2	2	0	4	6	0	MAX	150	59	2.542	Pool F
2	Vietnam	2	1	1	3	3	3	1.000	109	128	0.852	Pool F
3	India	2	0	2	2	0	6	0.000	80	152	0.526	Pool H

Date	Time		Score		Set 1	Set 2	Set 3	Set 4	Set 5	Total
01 Oct	11:00	India	0–3	China	8–25	10–25	9–25			27–75
02 Oct	11:00	Vietnam	3–0	India	27–25	25–10	25–18			77–53
03 Oct	17:00	China	3–0	Vietnam	25–7	25–14	25–11			75–32

=== Pool C ===
Pos	Team	Pld	W	L	Pts	SW	SL	SR	SPW	SPL	SPR	Qualification
1	Japan	2	2	0	4	6	0	MAX	150	62	2.419	Pool E
2	Australia	2	1	1	3	3	3	1.000	114	127	0.898	Pool E
3	Singapore	2	0	2	2	0	6	0.000	75	150	0.500	Pool G

Date	Time		Score		Set 1	Set 2	Set 3	Set 4	Set 5	Total
01 Oct	12:30	Japan	3–0	Australia	25–12	25–14	25–13			75–39
02 Oct	13:00	Singapore	0–3	Japan	11–25	3–25	9–25			23–75
03 Oct	11:00	Australia	3–0	Singapore	25–17	25–20	25–15			75–52

=== Pool D ===
Pos	Team	Pld	W	L	Pts	SW	SL	SR	SPW	SPL	SPR	Qualification
1	Chinese Taipei	2	2	0	4	6	2	3.000	173	147	1.177	Pool F
2	South Korea	2	1	1	3	5	3	1.667	176	136	1.294	Pool F
3	Indonesia	2	0	2	2	0	6	0.000	84	150	0.560	Pool H

Date	Time		Score		Set 1	Set 2	Set 3	Set 4	Set 5	Total
01 Oct	17:00	Chinese Taipei	3–0	Indonesia	25–13	25–19	25–14			75–46
02 Oct	17:00	South Korea	3–0	Indonesia	25–13	25–12	25–13			75–38
03 Oct	13:00	Chinese Taipei	3–2	South Korea	17–25	16–25	25–18	25–23	15–10	98–101

== Second round ==
- The results and the points of the matches between the same teams that were already played during the preliminary round shall be taken into account for the second round.

=== Pool E ===
Pos	Team	Pld	W	L	Pts	SW	SL	SR	SPW	SPL	SPR	Qualification
1	Japan	3	3	0	6	9	0	MAX	225	115	1.957	Quarterfinals
2	Thailand	3	2	1	5	6	3	2.000	197	150	1.313	Quarterfinals
3	New Zealand	3	1	2	4	3	7	0.429	160	238	0.672	Quarterfinals
4	Australia	3	0	3	3	1	9	0.111	169	248	0.681	Quarterfinals

Date	Time		Score		Set 1	Set 2	Set 3	Set 4	Set 5	Total
04 Oct	13:00	Japan	3–0	New Zealand	25–8	25–7	25–14			75–29
04 Oct	15:00	Thailand	3–0	Australia	25–13	25–12	25–17			75–42
05 Oct	13:00	Thailand	0–3	Japan	18–25	15–25	14–25			47–75
05 Oct	15:00	New Zealand	3–1	Australia	22–25	25–17	25–22	26–24		98–88

=== Pool F ===
Pos	Team	Pld	W	L	Pts	SW	SL	SR	SPW	SPL	SPR	Qualification
1	China	3	3	0	6	9	0	MAX	225	125	1.800	Quarterfinals
2	Chinese Taipei	3	2	1	5	6	5	1.200	215	228	0.943	Quarterfinals
3	South Korea	3	1	2	4	5	6	0.833	227	215	1.056	Quarterfinals
4	Vietnam	3	0	3	3	0	9	0.000	126	225	0.560	Quarterfinals

Date	Time		Score		Set 1	Set 2	Set 3	Set 4	Set 5	Total
04 Oct	17:00	China	3–0	South Korea	25–17	25–16	25–18			75–51
04 Oct	19:00	Chinese Taipei	3–0	Vietnam	25–18	25–16	25–18			75–52
05 Oct	17:00	China	3–0	Chinese Taipei	25–12	25–19	25–11			75–42
05 Oct	19:00	Vietnam	0–3	South Korea	12–25	9–25	21–25			42–75

=== Pool G ===
Pos	Team	Pld	W	L	Pts	SW	SL	SR	SPW	SPL	SPR	Qualification
1	Sri Lanka	1	1	0	2	3	0	MAX	75	60	1.250	9th–12th place
2	Singapore	1	0	1	1	0	3	0.000	60	75	0.800	9th–12th place

Date	Time		Score		Set 1	Set 2	Set 3	Set 4	Set 5	Total
04 Oct	11:00	Sri Lanka	3–0	Singapore	25–22	25–20	25–18			75–60

=== Pool H ===
Pos	Team	Pld	W	L	Pts	SW	SL	SR	SPW	SPL	SPR	Qualification
1	India	1	1	0	2	3	2	1.500	104	105	0.990	9th–12th place
2	Indonesia	1	0	1	1	2	3	0.667	105	104	1.010	9th–12th place

Date	Time		Score		Set 1	Set 2	Set 3	Set 4	Set 5	Total
05 Oct	11:00	India	3–2	Indonesia	22–25	25–21	28–30	25–23	15–13	115–112

== Classification 9th–12th ==
9th–12th places
6 October – Nakhon Ratchasima
Sri Lanka	0
Indonesia	3
6 October – Nakhon Ratchasima
India	3
Singapore	0

9th place
8 October – Nakhon Ratchasima
Indonesia	3
India	2
11th place
7 October – Nakhon Ratchasima
Sri Lanka	2
Singapore	3

=== Semifinals ===
Date	Time		Score		Set 1	Set 2	Set 3	Set 4	Set 5	Total
06 Oct	15:00	Sri Lanka	0–3	Indonesia	10–25	8–25	12–25			30–75
06 Oct	17:00	India	3–0	Singapore	25–13	25–20	25–17			75–50

=== 11th place ===
Date	Time		Score		Set 1	Set 2	Set 3	Set 4	Set 5	Total
07 Oct	19:00	Sri Lanka	2–3	Singapore	24–26	25–22	25–16	21–25	10–15	105–104

=== 9th place ===
Date	Time		Score		Set 1	Set 2	Set 3	Set 4	Set 5	Total
08 Oct	11:00	Indonesia	3–2	India	23–25	25–21	25–20	21–25	16–14	110–105

== Final round ==
Quarterfinals
7 October – Nakhon Ratchasima
Japan	3
Vietnam	0
7 October – Nakhon Ratchasima
Chinese Taipei	3
New Zealand	0
7 October – Nakhon Ratchasima
China	3
Australia	0
7 October – Nakhon Ratchasima
Thailand	3
South Korea	1

Semifinals
8 October – Nakhon Ratchasima
Japan	3
Chinese Taipei	0
8 October – Nakhon Ratchasima
China	3
Thailand	0

Final
9 October – Nakhon Ratchasima
Japan	1
China	3
3rd place
9 October – Nakhon Ratchasima
Chinese Taipei	3
Thailand	1

5th–8th places
8 October – Nakhon Ratchasima
Vietnam	3
New Zealand	0
8 October – Nakhon Ratchasima
Australia	0
South Korea	3

5th place
9 October – Nakhon Ratchasima
Vietnam	0
South Korea	3
7th place
9 October – Nakhon Ratchasima
New Zealand	2
Australia	3

=== Quarterfinals ===
Date	Time		Score		Set 1	Set 2	Set 3	Set 4	Set 5	Total
07 Oct	11:00	Chinese Taipei	3–0	New Zealand	25–17	25–18	25–8			75–43
07 Oct	13:00	Thailand	3–1	South Korea	25–17	25–18	14–25	25–22		89–82
07 Oct	15:00	China	3–0	Australia	25–13	25–5	25–16			75–34
07 Oct	17:00	Japan	3–0	Vietnam	25–12	25–5	25–16			75–33

=== 5th–8th semifinals ===
Date	Time		Score		Set 1	Set 2	Set 3	Set 4	Set 5	Total
08 Oct	13:00	Australia	0–3	South Korea	10–25	15–25	20–25			45–75
08 Oct	15:00	Vietnam	3–0	New Zealand	25–13	25–14	25–17			75–44

=== Semifinals ===
Date	Time		Score		Set 1	Set 2	Set 3	Set 4	Set 5	Total
08 Oct	17:00	China	3–0	Thailand	25–9	25–9	25–13			75–31
08 Oct	19:00	Japan	3–0	Chinese Taipei	25–10	25–13	25–14			75–37

=== 7th place ===
Date	Time		Score		Set 1	Set 2	Set 3	Set 4	Set 5	Total
09 Oct	11:00	New Zealand	2–3	Australia	25–13	20–25	17–25	25–19	19–21	106–103

=== 5th place ===
Date	Time		Score		Set 1	Set 2	Set 3	Set 4	Set 5	Total
09 Oct	13:00	Vietnam	0–3	South Korea	12–25	11–25	21–25			44–75

=== 3rd place ===
Date	Time		Score		Set 1	Set 2	Set 3	Set 4	Set 5	Total
09 Oct	15:00	Chinese Taipei	3–1	Thailand	25–16	22–25	25–20	26–24		98–85

=== Final ===
Date	Time		Score		Set 1	Set 2	Set 3	Set 4	Set 5	Total
09 Oct	17:00	Japan	1–3	China	20–25	26–24	18–25	17–25		81–99

== Final standing ==
Rank	Team
1st place, gold medalist(s)	China
2nd place, silver medalist(s)	Japan
3rd place, bronze medalist(s)	Chinese Taipei
4	Thailand
5	South Korea
6	Vietnam
7	Australia
8	New Zealand
9	Indonesia
10	India
11	Singapore
12	Sri Lanka

Qualified for the 2007 World Junior Championship

2006 Asian Junior Women's champions

China
Eighth title

== Awards ==
- MVP: (China) Yan Ni
- Best scorer: (Chinese Taipei) Wu Shu-fen
- Best spiker: (China) Chen Yao
- Best blocker: (China) Yan Ni
- Best server: (China) Fan Linlin
- Best setter: (Japan) Miho Watanabe
- Best libero: (China) Wang Qian
