= 1996 Asian Junior Women's Volleyball Championship =

1996 Asian Junior Women's Championship
Tournament details
- Host country: Thailand
- Teams: 11
- Venue: 1 (in 1 host city)

Final positions
- Champions: China (3rd title)

The 1996 Asian Junior Women's Volleyball Championship was held in Chiang Mai, Thailand

== Results ==
Pos	Team	Pld	W	L	Pts	SW	SL	SR	SPW	SPL	SPR
1st place, gold medalist(s)	China	0	0	0	0	0	0	—	0	0	—
2nd place, silver medalist(s)	Japan	0	0	0	0	0	0	—	0	0	—
3rd place, bronze medalist(s)	South Korea	0	0	0	0	0	0	—	0	0	—
4	Chinese Taipei	0	0	0	0	0	0	—	0	0	—
5	Thailand	0	0	0	0	0	0	—	0	0	—
6	India	0	0	0	0	0	0	—	0	0	—
7	Australia	0	0	0	0	0	0	—	0	0	—
8	Philippines	0	0	0	0	0	0	—	0	0	—
9	Vietnam	0	0	0	0	0	0	—	0	0	—
10	Sri Lanka	0	0	0	0	0	0	—	0	0	—
11	Hong Kong	0	0	0	0	0	0	—	0	0	—

== Final standing ==
Rank	Team
1st place, gold medalist(s)	China
2nd place, silver medalist(s)	Japan
3rd place, bronze medalist(s)	South Korea
4	Chinese Taipei
5	Thailand
6	India
7	Australia
8	Philippines
9	Vietnam
10	Sri Lanka
11	Hong Kong

Qualified for the 1997 World Junior Championship

1996 Asian Junior Women's champions

China
Third title
