= 2025 FIVB Volleyball Girls' U19 World Championship =

Volleyball competition

Tournament details
- Host countries: Croatia; Serbia
- Cities: Osijek; Vrnjačka Banja; Trstenik
- Dates: 2–13 July
- Teams: 24 (from 5 confederations)
- Venues: 3 (in 3 host cities)

Final positions
- Champions: Bulgaria (1st title)
- Runners-up: United States
- Third place: Poland
- Fourth place: Turkey

Tournament awards
- MVP: (Bulgaria) Dimana Ivanova
- Best Setter: (Bulgaria) Dimana Ivanova
- Best OH: (Bulgaria) Kalina Veneva; (United States) Suliane Davis
- Best MB: (Bulgaria) Denitsa Angelova; (Poland) Maja Koput
- Best OPP: (United States) Henley Anderson
- Best Libero: (Bulgaria) Viktoria Ninova

The 2025 FIVB Volleyball Girls' U19 World Championship was the 19th edition of the FIVB Volleyball Girls' U19 World Championship, the biennial international youth volleyball championship contested by the women's national teams under the age of 19 of the members associations of the Fédération Internationale de Volleyball (FIVB), the sport's global governing body. It was held in Croatia and Serbia from 2 to 13 July 2025.

Originally planned to be held from 7 to 20 July 2024, the tournament dates were moved up by one week at the hosts' request.

Starting with this edition, the tournament was officially expanded from 20 to 24 teams (although the 2023 edition had already been played with 24 teams), following the decision adopted by FIVB in June 2023.

== Host selection ==
On 28 March 2024, FIVB opened the bidding process for member associations whose countries were interested in hosting one of the four Age Group World Championships in 2025 (i.e., U19 Boys' and Girls' World Championships and U21 Men's and Women's World Championships). The expression of interest of the member associations had to be submitted to FIVB by 30 April 2024, 18:00 CEST (UTC+2).

FIVB announced the hosts for its four Age Group World Championship on 10 September 2024, with the joint bid of Croatia and Serbia being selected to host the 2023 Girls' U19 World Championship. This will be the second time that the FIVB Girls' U19 World Championship is shared by two countries after the previous edition also organized by Croatia, which repeats as host for the third time and Hungary.But this time the event is shared with Serbia.

== Venues ==
Osijek	Location of host city in Croatia.
Gradski vrt Hall	Location of host city in Croatia.
Capacity: 3,538 (Central Court); 1,770 (Small Hall)	Location of host city in Croatia.

On 11 October 2024, FIVB confirmed Osijek in Croacia and Belgrade in Serbia as the host cities. Subsequently, Belgrade was replaced by Vrnjačka Banja and Trstenik as the Serbian host cities, at request of the Volleyball Federation of Serbia. Osijek, Croatia will host Pool A and C at the Gradski vrt Hall. On the other hand, Serbia will host Pool B and D, with Pool B competing at the Sports Hall "Vlade Divac" (also known as Sports Hall "Vrnjačka Banja") in Vrnjačka Banja and Pool D taking place at the Sports Hall "Trstenik" in Trstenik.

The Gradski vrt Hall is a multi-purpose indoor arena comprising 7 main halls. Matches will be played in the two halls with spectator seats, called Hall A and B (referred to as Central Court and Small Hall by the FIVB).

Vrnjačka Banja	Location of host cities in Serbia.	Trstenik
Sports Hall "Vlade Divac"	Location of host cities in Serbia.	Sports Hall "Trstenik"
Capacity: 1,300	Location of host cities in Serbia.	Capacity: 750

== Qualification ==
A total of 24 national teams qualified for the final tournament. In addition to the defending champions and the two hosts which qualified automatically, 18 other teams qualified through five separate continental competitions which had to be completed by 31 December 2024 at the latest. Three remaining teams entered the tournament via the Girls' U19 FIVB World Ranking (as of 24 September 2024) among the teams not yet qualified.

The original slot allocation was set as follows:

- Defending champion (United States): 1
- Hosts (Croatia and Serbia): 2
- AVC (Asia & Oceania): 4
- CAVB (Africa): 3
- CEV (Europe): 6
- CSV (South America): 3
- NORCECA (North, Central America and Caribbean): 4
- Top teams not yet qualified as per Girls' U19 FIVB World Ranking: 1

However, the African Volleyball Confederation saw its quota reduced from 3 to 1 since its qualifying tournament featured only two teams, thus failing to meet the required minimum of four participating teams. Those two remaining places were added to the quota of teams that entered the competition through the Girls' U19 FIVB World Ranking (making a total of 3 slots for this via): Turkey (ranked 4), Egypt (ranked 11) and Chile (ranked 20).

=== Qualified teams ===
The following twenty-four teams qualified for the tournament.

Confederation	Qualifying tournament	Team qualified	Appearances			Previous best performance
Confederation	Qualifying tournament	Team qualified	Total	First	Last	Previous best performance
AVC (Asia & Oceania)	2024 Asian Women's U18 Championship ( (Thailand) Nakhon Pathom and Ratchaburi, 16–23 June)	Japan	16th	1989	2023	Champions (1995, 1999)
AVC (Asia & Oceania)	2024 Asian Women's U18 Championship ( (Thailand) Nakhon Pathom and Ratchaburi, 16–23 June)	Chinese Taipei	7th	1999	2015	Seventh place (2001)
AVC (Asia & Oceania)	2024 Asian Women's U18 Championship ( (Thailand) Nakhon Pathom and Ratchaburi, 16–23 June)	China	14th	1995	2023	Champions (2001, 2003, 2007, 2013)
AVC (Asia & Oceania)	2024 Asian Women's U18 Championship ( (Thailand) Nakhon Pathom and Ratchaburi, 16–23 June)	Thailand	11th	1997	2023	Fifth place (1997)
CAVB (Africa)	2024 Girls' U18 African Nations Championship ( (Tunisia) Tunis, 5–8 August)	Tunisia	5th	2005	2013	Thirteenth place (2005)
CAVB (Africa)	Girls' U19 FIVB World Ranking	Egypt	11th	1993	2023	Ninth place (1993, 2005)
CEV (Europe)	2024 Women's U18 European Championship ( (Greece) Heraklion and (Romania) Blaj, 1–13 July)	Italy	16th	1995	2023	Champions (2015, 2017)
CEV (Europe)	2024 Women's U18 European Championship ( (Greece) Heraklion and (Romania) Blaj, 1–13 July)	Belgium	4th	2007	2015	Third place (2009)
CEV (Europe)	2024 Women's U18 European Championship ( (Greece) Heraklion and (Romania) Blaj, 1–13 July)	Poland	12th	1991	2023	Third place (2001)
CEV (Europe)	2024 Women's U18 European Championship ( (Greece) Heraklion and (Romania) Blaj, 1–13 July)	Bulgaria	6th	1989	2023	Fifth place (1989)
CEV (Europe)	2024 Women's U18 European Championship ( (Greece) Heraklion and (Romania) Blaj, 1–13 July)	Germany	7th	2007	2023	Fifth place (2011)
CEV (Europe)	2024 Women's U18 European Championship ( (Greece) Heraklion and (Romania) Blaj, 1–13 July)	Spain	2nd	2001		Ninth place (2001)
CEV (Europe)	Host nations	Croatia	6th	1999	2023	Fifth place (2003, 2023)
CEV (Europe)	Host nations	Serbia^{a}	10th	2003	2023	Runners-up (2009)
CEV (Europe)	Girls' U19 FIVB World Ranking	Turkey	12th	1993	2023	Champions (2011)
CSV (South America)	2024 Girls' U19 South American Championship ( (Brazil) Araguari, 28 August–1 September)	Argentina	14th	1989	2023	Seventh place (1991, 2017)
CSV (South America)	2024 Girls' U19 South American Championship ( (Brazil) Araguari, 28 August–1 September)	Brazil	19th (all)	1989	2023	Champions (1997, 2005, 2009)
CSV (South America)	2024 Girls' U19 South American Championship ( (Brazil) Araguari, 28 August–1 September)	Peru	11th	1989	2023	Fourth place (1993, 2013)
CSV (South America)	Girls' U19 FIVB World Ranking	Chile	2nd	2023		Twenty-third place (2023)
NORCECA (North, Central America and Caribbean)	Defending champions	United States	14th	1989	2023	Champions (2019, 2023)
NORCECA (North, Central America and Caribbean)	2024 Girls' U19 NORCECA Continental Championship ( (Honduras) Tegucigalpa, 14–19 July)	Mexico	12th	1993	2023	Ninth place (1993, 2009)
NORCECA (North, Central America and Caribbean)	2024 Girls' U19 NORCECA Continental Championship ( (Honduras) Tegucigalpa, 14–19 July)	Puerto Rico	9th	1991	2023	Tenth place (1991)
NORCECA (North, Central America and Caribbean)	2024 Girls' U19 NORCECA Continental Championship ( (Honduras) Tegucigalpa, 14–19 July)	Canada	5th	1989	2023	Eleventh place (1989)
NORCECA (North, Central America and Caribbean)	2024 Girls' U19 NORCECA Continental Championship ( (Honduras) Tegucigalpa, 14–19 July)	Dominican Republic	10th	1997	2023	Runners-up (2017)

Notes
^{a} Competed as Serbia and Montenegro in 2003; 9 appearances as Serbia.

== Pools composition ==
The draw was held on 4 December 2024, 13:00 UTC±0, at the FIVB headquarters in Lausanne, Switzerland. The 24 participating teams were split into four pools of six. The hosts Croatia and Serbia, defending champions United States and the top five teams of the Girls' U19 FIVB World Ranking (as of 24 September 2024) were seeded in the first two positions of each pool following the serpentine system. FIVB reserved the right to seed the host teams as heads of pools A and B regardless of their position in the World Ranking (with the highest ranked team as head of Pool A and next ranked team as head of Pool B). The remaining 16 non-seeded teams were allocated into four pots according to their position in the same Girls' U19 FIVB World Ranking, in order to be drawn to complete the following four positions in each pool.

=== Seeding ===
Girls' U19 FIVB World Ranking of each team as of 24 October 2022 are shown in brackets, except the hosts Croatia and Serbia who ranked 7th and 26th, respectively.

Seeded teams		Unseeded teams to be drawn			
Line 1	Line 2	Pot 1 (line 3)	Pot 2 (line 4)	Pot 3 (line 5)	Pot 4 (line 6)
Croatia (Hosts, assigned to A1); Serbia (Hosts, assigned to B1); United States (1), assigned to C1; Italy (2), assigned to D1	Japan (3), assigned to D2; Turkey (4), assigned to B2; Brazil (5), assigned to C2; Thailand (6), assigned to A2	Bulgaria (8); Argentina (9); China (10); Egypt (11)	Puerto Rico (12); Poland (13); Canada (14); Tunisia (15)	Dominican Republic (16); Peru (16); Belgium (18); Mexico (19)	Chile (20); Chinese Taipei (20); Germany (22); Spain (26)

=== Draw ===
The draw procedure for the pools composition also followed the serpentine system and was as follows:

- Teams from pot 4 were drawn first and were placed in line 6 of each pool starting from pool D to pool A.
- Teams from pot 3 were then drawn and placed in line 5 of each pool starting from pool A to pool D.
- Teams from pot 2 were then drawn and placed in line 4 of each pool starting from pool D to pool A.
- Teams from pot 1 were drawn at the end and were placed in line 3 of each pool starting from pool A to pool D.

The pools composition after the draw was as follow:

Pool A
Pos	Team
A1	Croatia
A2	Thailand
A3	Egypt
A4	Canada
A5	Mexico
A6	Germany

Pool B
Pos	Team
B1	Serbia
B2	Brazil
B3	Argentina
B4	Puerto Rico
B5	Dominican Republic
B6	Chinese Taipei

Pool C
Pos	Team
C1	United States
C2	Turkey
C3	Bulgaria
C4	Poland
C5	Peru
C6	Spain

Pool D
Pos	Team
D1	Italy
D2	Japan
D3	China
D4	Tunisia
D5	Belgium
D6	Chile

== Competition format and changes ==
Although the previous edition of the tournament had already been played with 24 teams, the increase became official in June 2023 after the FIVB Board of Administration approved the proposal of its Volleyball Council to have 24 teams participating in all its Age Group World Championships (U19 and U21 in both genders). This increased one more place for the African Volleyball Confederation in addition to securing an automatic place for the defending champion and allocating two places for teams that qualify based on the corresponding FIVB Age Group World Ranking.

The competition format remained the same as the one adopted in the previous edition, with the 24 teams being split into four single round-robin pools of six. The top four teams from each pool advances to the round of 16, while the ramaining two continue their participation in the playoffs for places from 17th to 24th. The round of 16 winners advances to the quarter-finals, while the losers continue their participation in the playoffs for places from 9th to 16th. Finally, the 24 teams go through another three rounds: quarter-finals, semi-finals and finals for each team's final placement level (17th–24th, 9th–16th and 1st–8th).

=== Pool standing procedure ===
The ranking of teams in the preliminary round was established according the following criteria:

1. Total number of victories (matches won, matches lost);
2. Match points;
  - Match won 3–0 or 3–1: 3 points for the winner, 0 points for the loser
  - Match won 3–2: 2 points for the winner, 1 point for the loser
  - Match forfeited: 3 points for the winner, 0 points (0–25, 0–25, 0–25) for the loser
3. Sets ratio;
4. Points ratio;
5. If the tie continues between two teams: result of the last match between the tied teams. If the tie continues between three or more teams: a new classification would be made taking into consideration only the matches involving the teams in question.

== Squads ==
Each national team had to register a long-list roster with up to 25 players, which eventually had to be reduced to a final list of 12 players. Players born on or after 1 January 2007 were eligible to compete in the tournament.

== Preliminary round ==
- All match times are Central European Summer Time (UTC+02:00).

=== Pool A ===
Venue: Gradski vrt Hall–Central Court.

Pos	Team	Pld	W	L	Pts	SW	SL	SR	SPW	SPL	SPR	Qualification
1	Croatia (H)	5	5	0	13	15	6	2.500	499	436	1.144	Round of 16
2	Germany	5	4	1	13	14	7	2.000	487	413	1.179	Round of 16
3	Mexico	5	3	2	9	11	6	1.833	382	368	1.038	Round of 16
4	Thailand	5	1	4	4	7	13	0.538	404	453	0.892	Round of 16
5	Canada	5	1	4	3	6	13	0.462	410	467	0.878	17th–24th places
6	Egypt	5	1	4	3	5	13	0.385	379	424	0.894	17th–24th places

Source: FIVB Girls' U19 World Championship 2025 - Standings
Rules for classification: Pool standing procedure
(H) Host

Date	Time		Score		Set 1	Set 2	Set 3	Set 4	Set 5	Total	Attd	Report
2 Jul	15:15	Egypt	1–3	Canada	23–25	25–14	21–25	18–25		87–89	500	P2 Report
2 Jul	18:15	Croatia	3–2	Germany	20–25	25–23	25–17	22–25	15–10	107–100	600	P2 Report
2 Jul	21:15	Thailand	0–3	Mexico	20–25	14–25	20–25			54–75	20	P2 Report
3 Jul	15:15	Egypt	1–3	Germany	25–22	20–25	16–25	21–25		82–97	40	P2 Report
3 Jul	18:15	Croatia	3–1	Mexico	25–17	23–25	25–22	25–19		98–83	200	P2 Report
3 Jul	21:15	Thailand	3–1	Canada	22–25	25–12	25–17	25–22		97–76	100	P2 Report
4 Jul	15:15	Mexico	1–3	Germany	25–23	20–25	16–25	12–25		73–98	60	P2 Report
4 Jul	18:15	Croatia	3–1	Canada	25–19	30–28	25–27	35–33		115–107	500	P2 Report
4 Jul	21:15	Thailand	1–3	Egypt	21–25	18–25	26–24	22–25		87–99	50	P2 Report
6 Jul	15:15	Canada	0–3	Mexico	19–25	22–25	18–25			59–75	60	P2 Report
6 Jul	18:15	Croatia	3–0	Egypt	25–16	25–21	25–15			75–52	500	P2 Report
6 Jul	21:15	Thailand	1–3	Germany	15–25	26–24	17–25	14–25		72–99	92	P2 Report
7 Jul	15:15	Egypt	0–3	Mexico	12–25	23–25	24–26			59–76	20	P2 Report
7 Jul	18:15	Croatia	3–2	Thailand	19–25	25–17	25–19	20–25	15–8	104–94	300	P2 Report
7 Jul	21:15	Canada	1–3	Germany	25–18	16–25	15–25	23–25		79–93	50	P2 Report

=== Pool B ===
Venue: Sports Hall "Vlade Divac".

Pos	Team	Pld	W	L	Pts	SW	SL	SR	SPW	SPL	SPR	Qualification
1	Brazil	5	5	0	14	15	3	5.000	427	340	1.256	Round of 16
2	Chinese Taipei	5	4	1	11	14	8	1.750	498	459	1.085	Round of 16
3	Serbia (H)	5	3	2	9	12	9	1.333	464	439	1.057	Round of 16
4	Argentina	5	2	3	4	7	13	0.538	405	440	0.920	Round of 16
5	Puerto Rico	5	1	4	6	9	12	0.750	420	445	0.944	17th–24th places
6	Dominican Republic	5	0	5	1	3	15	0.200	340	431	0.789	17th–24th places

Source: FIVB Girls' U19 World Championship 2025 - Standings
Rules for classification: Pool standing procedure
(H) Host

Date	Time		Score		Set 1	Set 2	Set 3	Set 4	Set 5	Total	Attd	Report
2 Jul	15:15	Argentina	3–2	Puerto Rico	21–25	25–11	25–18	17–25	15–10	103–89	50	P2 Report
2 Jul	18:15	Serbia	2–3	Chinese Taipei	19–25	25–21	26–28	25–21	13–15	108–110	150	P2 Report
2 Jul	21:15	Brazil	3–0	Dominican Republic	25–14	25–13	25–20			75–47	49	P2 Report
3 Jul	15:15	Argentina	0–3	Chinese Taipei	19–25	19–25	20–25			58–75	20	P2 Report
3 Jul	18:15	Serbia	3–0	Dominican Republic	25–13	25–17	25–20			75–50	50	P2 Report
3 Jul	21:15	Brazil	3–0	Puerto Rico	25–16	25–17	25–20			75–53	30	P2 Report
4 Jul	15:15	Dominican Republic	1–3	Chinese Taipei	19–25	23–25	25–23	17–25		84–98	20	P2 Report
4 Jul	18:15	Serbia	3–2	Puerto Rico	19–25	26–24	19–25	25–10	18–16	107–100	260	P2 Report
4 Jul	21:15	Brazil	3–0	Argentina	25–22	25–8	25–23			75–53	59	P2 Report
6 Jul	15:15	Puerto Rico	3–0	Dominican Republic	25–22	25–12	25–19			75–53	25	P2 Report
6 Jul	18:15	Serbia	3–1	Argentina	25–16	25–23	20–25	25–19		95–83	180	P2 Report
6 Jul	21:15	Brazil	3–2	Chinese Taipei	25–21	20–25	25–23	20–25	16–14	106–108	20	P2 Report
7 Jul	15:15	Argentina	3–2	Dominican Republic	25–21	21–25	22–25	25–23	15–12	108–106	25	P2 Report
7 Jul	18:15	Serbia	1–3	Brazil	25–21	21–25	12–25	21–25		79–96	165	P2 Report
7 Jul	21:15	Puerto Rico	2–3	Chinese Taipei	22–25	19–25	25–22	25–20	12–15	103–107	46	P2 Report

=== Pool C ===
Venue: Gradski vrt Hall–Small Court.

Pos	Team	Pld	W	L	Pts	SW	SL	SR	SPW	SPL	SPR	Qualification
1	Poland	5	5	0	13	15	5	3.000	470	398	1.181	Round of 16
2	Bulgaria	5	4	1	10	13	7	1.857	430	413	1.041	Round of 16
3	United States	5	3	2	11	13	8	1.625	468	430	1.088	Round of 16
4	Turkey	5	2	3	7	9	10	0.900	420	389	1.080	Round of 16
5	Spain	5	1	4	4	7	13	0.538	400	444	0.901	17th–24th places
6	Peru	5	0	5	0	1	15	0.067	280	394	0.711	17th–24th places

Source: FIVB Girls' U19 World Championship 2025 - Standings
Rules for classification: Pool standing procedure

Date	Time		Score		Set 1	Set 2	Set 3	Set 4	Set 5	Total	Attd	Report
2 Jul	15:15	Bulgaria	1–3	Poland	22–25	18–25	25–22	20–25		85–97	150	P2 Report
2 Jul	18:15	Turkey	3–0	Peru	25–14	25–18	25–15			75–47	ND	P2 Report
2 Jul	21:15	United States	3–1	Spain	22–25	25–16	25–12	25–23		97–76	ND	P2 Report
3 Jul	15:15	Turkey	0–3	Poland	24–26	18–25	18–25			60–76	200	P2 Report
3 Jul	18:15	Bulgaria	3–0	Spain	25–19	25–22	25–21			75–62	ND	P2 Report
3 Jul	21:15	United States	3–0	Peru	25–19	25–18	25–18			75–55	ND	P2 Report
4 Jul	15:15	Turkey	2–3	Bulgaria	20–25	25–17	20–25	25–17	11–15	101–99	125	P2 Report
4 Jul	18:15	Peru	1–3	Spain	18–25	17–25	25–19	9–25		69–94	89	P2 Report
4 Jul	21:15	United States	2–3	Poland	23–25	25–23	17–25	27–25	14–16	106–114	170	P2 Report
6 Jul	15:15	Poland	3–0	Peru	25–16	25–20	25–15			75–51	40	P2 Report
6 Jul	18:15	Turkey	3–1	Spain	20–25	25–17	25–16	25–14		95–72	80	P2 Report
6 Jul	21:15	United States	2–3	Bulgaria	15–25	25–16	25–27	25–13	5–15	95–96	120	P2 Report
7 Jul	15:15	Poland	3–2	Spain	20–25	25–15	25–23	23–25	15–8	108–96	80	P2 Report
7 Jul	18:15	Bulgaria	3–0	Peru	25–17	25–18	25–23			75–58	30	P2 Report
7 Jul	21:15	United States	3–1	Turkey	25–19	20–25	25–22	25–23		95–89	150	P2 Report

=== Pool D ===
Venue: Sports Hall "Trstenik".

Pos	Team	Pld	W	L	Pts	SW	SL	SR	SPW	SPL	SPR	Qualification
1	Italy	5	5	0	15	15	3	5.000	426	354	1.203	Round of 16
2	China	5	4	1	11	13	5	2.600	418	353	1.184	Round of 16
3	Japan	5	3	2	10	12	6	2.000	408	337	1.211	Round of 16
4	Belgium	5	2	3	6	7	9	0.778	331	362	0.914	Round of 16
5	Chile	5	1	4	2	3	14	0.214	286	405	0.706	17th–24th places
6	Tunisia	5	0	5	1	2	15	0.133	347	405	0.857	17th–24th places

Source: FIVB Girls' U19 World Championship 2025 - Standings
Rules for classification: Pool standing procedure

Date	Time		Score		Set 1	Set 2	Set 3	Set 4	Set 5	Total	Attd	Report
2 Jul	15:15	Japan	3–0	Belgium	25–15	25–16	25–14			75–45	50	P2 Report
2 Jul	18:15	China	3–0	Tunisia	25–21	25–18	25–15			75–54	75	P2 Report
2 Jul	21:15	Italy	3–0	Chile	25–9	25–17	25–11			75–37	200	P2 Report
3 Jul	15:15	Japan	3–0	Tunisia	28–26	25–19	25–18			78–63	50	P2 Report
3 Jul	18:15	China	3–0	Chile	25–17	25–19	25–15			75–51	75	P2 Report
3 Jul	21:15	Italy	3–1	Belgium	17–25	25–12	25–21	25–14		92–72	235	P2 Report
4 Jul	15:15	Japan	2–3	China	25–13	14–25	17–25	25–20	10–15	91–98	50	P2 Report
4 Jul	18:15	Belgium	3–0	Chile	25–22	25–18	25–16			75–56	170	P2 Report
4 Jul	21:15	Italy	3–0	Tunisia	25–23	25–22	25–18			75–63	180	P2 Report
6 Jul	15:15	Tunisia	0–3	Belgium	20–25	22–25	20–25			62–75	54	P2 Report
6 Jul	18:15	Japan	3–0	Chile	25–16	25–14	25–10			75–40	138	P2 Report
6 Jul	21:15	Italy	3–1	China	13–25	28–26	27–25	25–17		93–93	285	P2 Report
7 Jul	15:15	Tunisia	2–3	Chile	25–18	19–25	22–25	25–18	14–16	105–102	30	P2 Report
7 Jul	18:15	China	3–0	Belgium	25–18	27–25	25–21			77–64	80	P2 Report
7 Jul	21:15	Italy	3–1	Japan	25–21	16–25	25–22	25–21		91–89	285	P2 Report

== Final round ==
- All match times are Central European Summer Time (UTC+02:00).

=== 17th–24th places ===
Venues: GSH–Gradski vrt Small Hall, TRS–Sports Hall "Trstenik".

21st place match
12 July – Trstenik
Peru	3
Egypt	1
23rd place match
12 July – Trstenik
Tunisia	1
Dominican Republic	3

21st–24th semifinals
11 July – Trstenik
Peru	3
Tunisia	1
11 July – Trstenik
Egypt	3
Dominican Republic	1

17th–24th quarterfinals
8 July – Osijek
Canada	3
Peru	2
8 July – Trstenik
Puerto Rico	3
Tunisia	1
8 July – Osijek
Spain	3
Egypt	0
8 July – Trstenik
Chile	3
Dominican Republic	2

17th–20th semifinals
11 July – Osijek
Canada	3
Puerto Rico	1
11 July – Osijek
Spain	3
Chile	0

17th place match
12 July – Osijek
Canada	2
Spain	3
19th place match
12 July – Osijek
Puerto Rico	1
Chile	3

==== 17th–24th quarterfinals ====
Date	Time	Venue		Score		Set 1	Set 2	Set 3	Set 4	Set 5	Total	Attd	Report
8 Jul	15:15	GSH	Canada	3–2	Peru	21–25	20–25	25–17	25–21	15–12	106–100	42	P2 Report
8 Jul	15:15	TRS	Puerto Rico	3–1	Tunisia	25–18	22–25	25–17	25–21		97–81	56	P2 Report
8 Jul	18:15	GSH	Spain	3–0	Egypt	25–23	25–19	25–21			75–63	100	P2 Report
8 Jul	18:15	TRS	Chile	3–2	Dominican Republic	25–17	26–24	17–25	23–25	15–10	106–101	77	P2 Report

==== 21st–24th semifinals ====
Date	Time	Venue		Score		Set 1	Set 2	Set 3	Set 4	Set 5	Total	Attd	Report
11 Jul	15:15	TRS	Peru	3–1	Tunisia	25–13	25–23	18–25	25–23		93–84	40	P2 Report
11 Jul	18:15	TRS	Egypt	3–1	Dominican Republic	20–25	25–10	25–23	25–15		95–73	30	P2 Report

==== 17th–20th semifinals ====
Date	Time	Venue		Score		Set 1	Set 2	Set 3	Set 4	Set 5	Total	Attd	Report
11 Jul	15:15	GSH	Canada	3–1	Puerto Rico	25–21	15–25	25–23	25–14		90–83	100	P2 Report
11 Jul	18:15	GSH	Spain	3–0	Chile	25–17	25–10	25–20			75–47	65	P2 Report

==== 23rd place match ====
Date	Time	Venue		Score		Set 1	Set 2	Set 3	Set 4	Set 5	Total	Attd	Report
12 Jul	15:15	TRS	Tunisia	1–3	Dominican Republic	23–25	25–12	23–25	20–25		91–87	23	P2 Report

==== 21st place match ====
Date	Time	Venue		Score		Set 1	Set 2	Set 3	Set 4	Set 5	Total	Attd	Report
12 Jul	18:15	TRS	Peru	3–1	Egypt	28–26	25–12	24–26	26–24		103–88	55	P2 Report

==== 19th place match ====
Date	Time	Venue		Score		Set 1	Set 2	Set 3	Set 4	Set 5	Total	Attd	Report
12 Jul	15:15	GSH	Puerto Rico	1–3	Chile	12–25	25–19	20–25	25–27		82–96	50	P2 Report

==== 17th place match ====
Date	Time	Venue		Score		Set 1	Set 2	Set 3	Set 4	Set 5	Total	Attd	Report
12 Jul	18:15	GSH	Canada	2–3	Spain	25–17	17–25	25–10	23–25	9–15	99–92	100	P2 Report

=== 1st–16th places ===
Venues: GCC–Gradski vrt Central Court, GSH–Gradski vrt Small Hall, VLA–Sports Hall "Vlade Divac", TRS–Sports Hall "Trstenik".

9th place match
13 July – Vrnjačka Banja
Croatia	3
Argentina	0
11th place match
13 July – Trstenik
Mexico	1
Chinese Taipei	3
13th place match
13 July – Vrnjačka Banja
Belgium	1
Thailand	3
15th place match
13 July – Trstenik
Serbia	3
Germany	0

9th–12th semifinals
12 July – Vrnjačka Banja
Croatia	3
Mexico	0
12 July – Trstenik
Chinese Taipei	1
Argentina	3
13th–16th semifinals
12 July – Vrnjačka Banja
Serbia	2
Belgium	3
12 July – Vrnjačka Banja
Germany	2
Thailand	3

9th–16th quarterfinals
11 July – Vrnjačka Banja
Serbia	0
Croatia	3
11 July – Vrnjačka Banja
Mexico	3
Belgium	2
11 July – Vrnjačka Banja
Chinese Taipei	3
Thailand	1
11 July – Trstenik
Germany	1
Argentina	3

Round of 16
8 July – Vrnjačka Banja
China	3
Serbia	2
8 July – Osijek
Croatia	1
Turkey	3
8 July – Osijek
Bulgaria	3
Mexico	0
8 July – Vrnjačka Banja
Brazil	3
Belgium	0
8 July – Vrnjačka Banja
Chinese Taipei	1
Japan	3
8 July – Osijek
Poland	3
Thailand	0
8 July – Osijek
Germany	2
United States	3
8 July – Trstenik
Italy	3
Argentina	1

Quarterfinals
11 July – Osijek
China	1
Turkey	3
11 July – Osijek
Bulgaria	3
Brazil	1
11 July – Osijek
Japan	0
Poland	3
11 July – Osijek
United States	3
Italy	2

Semifinals
12 July – Osijek
Turkey	2
Bulgaria	3
12 July – Osijek
Poland	0
United States	3
5th–8th semifinals
12 July – Osijek
China	3
Brazil	1
12 July – Osijek
Japan	2
Italy	3

Final
13 July – Osijek
Bulgaria	3
United States	1
3rd place match
13 July – Osijek
Turkey	0
Poland	3
5th place match
13 July – Osijek
China	2
Italy	3
7th place match
13 July – Osijek
Brazil	0
Japan	3

==== Round of 16 ====
Date	Time	Venue		Score		Set 1	Set 2	Set 3	Set 4	Set 5	Total	Attd	Report
8 Jul	15:15	GCC	Bulgaria	3–0	Mexico	25–22	25–16	25–16			75–54	40	P2 Report
8 Jul	15:15	VLA	Chinese Taipei	1–3	Japan	25–20	16–25	22–25	18–25		81–95	15	P2 Report
8 Jul	18:15	VLA	China	3–2	Serbia	25–19	24–26	24–26	25–15	16–14	114–100	80	P2 Report
8 Jul	18:15	GCC	Croatia	1–3	Turkey	12–25	26–24	13–25	12–25		63–99	400	P2 Report
8 Jul	21:15	VLA	Brazil	3–0	Belgium	26–24	25–20	25–19			76–63	30	P2 Report
8 Jul	21:15	GCC	Germany	2–3	United States	18–25	28–26	25–17	15–25	13–15	99–108	102	P2 Report
8 Jul	21:15	GSH	Poland	3–0	Thailand	25–17	25–20	25–23			75–60	100	P2 Report
8 Jul	21:15	TRS	Italy	3–1	Argentina	25–17	22–25	25–12	25–12		97–66	335	P2 Report

==== 9th–16th quarterfinals ====
Date	Time	Venue		Score		Set 1	Set 2	Set 3	Set 4	Set 5	Total	Attd	Report
11 Jul	15:15	VLA	Chinese Taipei	3–1	Thailand	27–25	17–25	25–18	25–19		94–87	14	P2 Report
11 Jul	18:15	VLA	Serbia	0–3	Croatia	29–31	20–25	12–25			61–81	118	P2 Report
11 Jul	21:15	VLA	Mexico	3–2	Belgium	21–25	22–25	25–21	25–19	15–10	108–100	35	P2 Report
11 Jul	21:15	TRS	Germany	1–3	Argentina	21–25	20–25	25–21	11–25		77–96	120	P2 Report

==== Quarterfinals ====
Date	Time	Venue		Score		Set 1	Set 2	Set 3	Set 4	Set 5	Total	Attd	Report
11 Jul	15:15	GCC	China	1–3	Turkey	20–25	25–23	19–25	9–25		73–98	50	P2 Report
11 Jul	18:15	GCC	Japan	0–3	Poland	20–25	19–25	25–27			64–77	188	P2 Report
11 Jul	21:15	GCC	Bulgaria	3–1	Brazil	25–15	21–25	25–18	25–20		96–78	94	P2 Report
11 Jul	21:15	GSH	United States	3–2	Italy	31–29	23–25	21–25	30–28	15–8	120–115	250	P2 Report

==== 13th–16th semifinals ====
Date	Time	Venue		Score		Set 1	Set 2	Set 3	Set 4	Set 5	Total	Attd	Report
12 Jul	15:15	VLA	Germany	2–3	Thailand	25–22	25–21	22–25	16–25	9–15	97–108	20	P2 Report
12 Jul	18:15	VLA	Serbia	2–3	Belgium	25–22	20–25	25–18	23–25	10–15	103–105	30	P2 Report

==== 9th–12th semifinals ====
Date	Time	Venue		Score		Set 1	Set 2	Set 3	Set 4	Set 5	Total	Attd	Report
12 Jul	21:15	VLA	Croatia	3–0	Mexico	25–19	25–16	25–20			75–55	10	P2 Report
12 Jul	21:15	TRS	Chinese Taipei	1–3	Argentina	25–14	20–25	15–25	18–25		78–89	153	P2 Report

==== 5th–8th semifinals ====
Date	Time	Venue		Score		Set 1	Set 2	Set 3	Set 4	Set 5	Total	Attd	Report
12 Jul	15:15	GCC	China	3–1	Brazil	23–25	27–25	27–25	28–26		105–101	47	P2 Report
12 Jul	18:15	GCC	Japan	2–3	Italy	25–16	20–25	28–26	22–25	7–15	102–107	74	P2 Report

==== Semifinals ====
Date	Time	Venue		Score		Set 1	Set 2	Set 3	Set 4	Set 5	Total	Attd	Report
12 Jul	21:15	GCC	Turkey	2–3	Bulgaria	23–25	25–18	21–25	25–23	9–15	103–106	110	P2 Report
12 Jul	21:15	GSH	Poland	0–3	United States	14–25	18–25	19–25			51–75	ND	P2 Report

==== 15th place match ====
Date	Time	Venue		Score		Set 1	Set 2	Set 3	Set 4	Set 5	Total	Attd	Report
13 Jul	18:15	VLA	Serbia	3–0	Germany	25–14	25–21	25–23			75–58	225	P2 Report

==== 13th place match ====
Date	Time	Venue		Score		Set 1	Set 2	Set 3	Set 4	Set 5	Total	Attd	Report
13 Jul	15:15	VLA	Belgium	1–3	Thailand	25–20	20–25	23–25	17–25		85–95	17	P2 Report

==== 11th place match ====
Date	Time	Venue		Score		Set 1	Set 2	Set 3	Set 4	Set 5	Total	Attd	Report
13 Jul	15:15	TRS	Mexico	1–3	Chinese Taipei	21–25	28–30	25–17	15–25		89–97	25	P2 Report

==== 9th place match ====
Date	Time	Venue		Score		Set 1	Set 2	Set 3	Set 4	Set 5	Total	Attd	Report
13 Jul	18:15	TRS	Croatia	3–0	Argentina	25–14	25–20	25–17			75–51	75	P2 Report

==== 7th place match ====
Date	Time	Venue		Score		Set 1	Set 2	Set 3	Set 4	Set 5	Total	Attd	Report
13 Jul	15:15	GSH	Brazil	0–3	Japan	22–25	23–25	26–28			71–78	ND	P2 Report

==== 5th place match ====
Date	Time	Venue		Score		Set 1	Set 2	Set 3	Set 4	Set 5	Total	Attd	Report
13 Jul	18:15	GSH	China	2–3	Italy	25–18	25–21	25–27	17–25	15–17	107–108	22	P2 Report

==== 3rd place match ====
Date	Time	Venue		Score		Set 1	Set 2	Set 3	Set 4	Set 5	Total	Attd	Report
13 Jul	15:15	GCC	Turkey	0–3	Poland	19–25	21–25	20–25			60–75	84	P2 Report

==== Final ====
Date	Time	Venue		Score		Set 1	Set 2	Set 3	Set 4	Set 5	Total	Attd	Report
13 Jul	18:15	GCC	Bulgaria	3–1	United States	21–25	25–16	25–17	29–27		100–85	500	P2 Report

== Final standing ==
Rank	Team
1st place, gold medalist(s)	Bulgaria
2nd place, silver medalist(s)	United States
3rd place, bronze medalist(s)	Poland
4	Turkey
5	Italy
6	China
7	Japan
8	Brazil
9	Croatia
10	Argentina
11	Chinese Taipei
12	Mexico
13	Thailand
14	Belgium
15	Serbia
16	Germany
17	Spain
18	Canada
19	Chile
20	Puerto Rico
21	Peru
22	Egypt
23	Dominican Republic
24	Tunisia

Qualified for the 2027 World Championship

2025 Girls' U19 World champions

Bulgaria
First title

12–girl roster
Simona Ivanova, Viktoria Ninova (c), Nicol Okoro, Alexandra Kitipova, Edna Todorova, Dimana Ivanova, Stefani Dyankova, Kalina Veneva, Viara Parapunova, Elisaveta Sarieva, Denitsa Angelova, Darina Naneva
Head coach
Atanas Petrov

== Awards ==
The following individual awards were presented at the end of the tournament.

- Most valuable player
  (Bulgaria) Dimana Ivanova
- Best setter
  (Bulgaria) Dimana Ivanova
- Best outside spikers
  (Bulgaria) Kalina Veneva
  (United States) Suliane Davis
- Best middle blockers
  (Bulgaria) Denitsa Angelova
  (Poland) Maja Koput
- Best opposite spiker
  (United States) Henley Anderson
- Best libero
  (Bulgaria) Viktoria Ninova

== Statistics leaders ==
The statistics of leaders for each skill are recorded throughout the tournament.

Best Scorers
Rank	Player	Attacks	Blocks	Serves	Total
1	(Japan) Rion Chuganji	161	18	11	190
2	(Croatia) Asja Zolota	129	20	11	160
3	(Brazil) Luize Tavares	119	25	7	151
4	(Belgium) Mila Vlahović	107	15	16	138
5	(Bulgaria) Kalina Veneva	115	11	11	137

Best Attackers
Rank	Player	Spikes	Faults	Shots	%	Total
1	(Japan) Rion Chuganji	161	62	165	41.49	388
2	(Croatia) Asja Zolota	129	71	166	35.25	366
3	(Brazil) Luize Tavares	119	42	172	35.74	333
4	(Bulgaria) Kalina Veneva	115	40	152	37.46	307
5	(Chinese Taipei) Xu Zhen-xuan	111	47	129	38.68	287

Best Blockers
Rank	Player	Blocks	Faults	Rebounds	Avg	Total
1	(Italy) Alessandra Talarico	40	51	56	4.44	147
2	(Turkey) Begüm Kaçmaz	33	32	48	3.67	113
3	(Croatia) Klara Vasilj	32	38	28	3.56	98
4	(Bulgaria) Denitsa Angelova	30	28	43	3.33	101
4	(Poland) Maja Koput	30	51	39	3.33	120

Best Servers
Rank	Player	Aces	Faults	Hits	Avg	Total
1	(Bulgaria) Denitsa Angelova	17	23	76	1.89	116
2	(Japan) Yuzuki Baba	16	18	105	1.78	139
2	(Belgium) Mila Vlahović	16	23	58	1.78	97
2	(United States) Suliane Davis	16	17	87	1.78	120
5	(Bulgaria) Darina Naneva	15	21	94	1.67	130
5	(Serbia) Maša Vrcelj	15	20	109	1.88	144
5	(Serbia) Elena Martić	15	18	81	1.67	114
5	(China) Zhai Yurui	15	21	91	1.67	127

Best Setters
Rank	Player	Running	Faults	Still	Avg	Total
1	(Chinese Taipei) Chang Ting-wei	297	2	457	33.00	756
2	(Italy) Asia Spaziano	254	2	596	28.22	852
2	(Bulgaria) Dimana Ivanova	240	7	688	26.67	935
4	(Canada) Remy Catojo	233	14	483	29.12	730
5	(United States) Genevieve Harris	206	4	611	22.89	821

Best Diggers
Rank	Player	Digs	Faults	Receptions	Avg	Total
1	(Croatia) Carla Stošić	160	25	44	17.78	229
2	(Thailand) Jaidee Sirikarnda	157	55	46	17.44	258
3	(Bulgaria) Viktoria Ninova	138	34	32	15.33	204
4	(Japan) Nanami Tokumoto	132	31	40	14.67	203
5	(Turkey) Duru Zambak	129	43	44	14.33	216

Best Receivers
Rank	Player	Excellents	Faults	Serve	%	Total
1	(Thailand) Jaidee Sirikarnda	61	19	177	23.74	257
2	(Chinese Taipei) Chen Pin-yu	58	13	101	33.72	172
3	(Argentina) Julieta Ruelli	56	12	156	25.00	224
3	(Chinese Taipei) Sun Yu-hsin	56	14	98	33.33	168
5	(Chinese Taipei) Chen Yi	55	11	107	31.79	173

== See also ==
- 2025 FIVB Volleyball Boys' U19 World Championship
- 2025 FIVB Volleyball Women's U21 World Championship
- 2025 FIVB Women's Volleyball World Championship
