= 2024 Women's U18 European Volleyball Championship =

2024 Women's U18 Volleyball European Championship

Tournament details
- Host countries: Greece; Romania
- Cities: Heraklion; Blaj
- Dates: 1–13 July 2024
- Teams: 16
- Venue: (in 2 host cities)

Final positions
- Champions: Bulgaria (1st title)
- Runners-up: Belgium
- Third place: Italy
- Fourth place: Poland

The 2024 Women's U18 Volleyball European Championship will be the 16th edition of the Girls' Youth European Volleyball Championship, a biennial international volleyball tournament organised by the European Volleyball Confederation (CEV) the girls' under-18 national teams of Europe. The tournament will be held in Romania and Greece from 1 to 13 July 2024.

== Host selection ==
- Cyprus (withdrew)
- Greece
- Romania

Originally, Cyprus and Greece were given the hosting rights together on 12 October 2022. However, Cyprus withdrew and Romania took their place as a co-host on 13 February 2024.

== Qualification ==
This competition is the first that a team from Lithuania has qualified for a CEV event.

Means of qualification		Qualifier
Host countries		Romania
Host countries		Greece
Qualification 1st round	BVA	Turkey
Qualification 1st round	EEVZA	Poland
Qualification 1st round	MEVZA	Croatia
Qualification 1st round	NEVZA	Finland
Qualification 1st round	WEVZA	Belgium
Qualification 2nd round	Pool A	Italy
Qualification 2nd round	Pool B	Netherlands
Qualification 2nd round	Pool C	Germany
Qualification 2nd round	Pool D	Slovenia
Qualification 2nd round	Pool E	Bulgaria
Qualification 2nd round	Best runners-up	Spain
Qualification 2nd round	Best runners-up	Serbia
Qualification 2nd round	Best runners-up	Hungary
Qualification 2nd round	Best runners-up	Lithuania

== Draw ==
The draw was on 19 April 2024 in Luxembourg.

== Venues ==
The venues are in Blaj and Heraklion. The knockout stage will be in Blaj.

Pool I, Final round		Pool II	
(Romania) Blaj	Blaj is located in Romania	Heraklion	Heraklion is located in Greece
Sala Polivalentă	Blaj is located in Romania	Lido Indoor Hall	Heraklion is located in Greece
Capacity: 2 000	Blaj is located in Romania	Capacity: 1,400	Heraklion is located in Greece

== Broadcasting rights ==
Games in Romania can be viewed on the Romanian Volleyball Federation's YouTube channel and Greece's games can be watched on the Hellenic Volleyball Federation YouTube channel.

== Group stage ==
=== Pool A ===
- All times are local.

Pos	Team	Pld	W	L	Pts	SW	SL	SR	SPW	SPL	SPR	Qualification
1	Italy	7	6	1	17	19	6	3.167	603	528	1.142	Semifinals
2	Belgium	7	6	1	16	18	10	1.800	645	574	1.124	Semifinals
3	Spain	7	5	2	15	17	11	1.545	645	613	1.052	
4	Slovenia	7	4	3	14	16	12	1.333	622	581	1.071	
5	Croatia	7	3	4	9	15	16	0.938	650	678	0.959	
6	Romania (H)	7	3	4	8	11	16	0.688	573	603	0.950	
7	Netherlands	7	1	6	4	10	20	0.500	604	674	0.896	
8	Serbia	7	0	7	1	6	21	0.286	544	635	0.857	

Source: Report
(H) Host

Date	Time		Score		Set 1	Set 2	Set 3	Set 4	Set 5	Total	Report
1 July	12:00	Italy	3–2	Croatia	25–22	23–25	26–28	25–20	15–10	114–105	Report
1 July	14:30	Slovenia	0–3	Belgium	22–25	23–25	16–25			61–75	Report
1 July	17:30	Spain	3–0	Romania	31–29	25–19	25–14			81–62	Report
1 July	20:00	Netherlands	3–2	Serbia	17–25	27–25	25–16	15–25	15–8	99–99	Report
2 July	12:00	Spain	2–3	Belgium	26–24	20–25	25–21	20–25	12–15	103–110	Report
2 July	14:30	Italy	3–1	Netherlands	25–21	25–14	19–25	25–22		94–82	Report
2 July	17:30	Romania	3–1	Serbia	25–12	21–25	25–15	25–21		96–73	Report
2 July	20:00	Croatia	3–2	Slovenia	24–26	26–24	25–20	12–25	15–11	102–106	Report
3 July	12:00	Spain	0–3	Italy	21–25	27–29	25–27			73–81	Report
3 July	14:30	Netherlands	2–3	Croatia	19–25	25–23	25–18	20–25	9–15	98–106	Report
3 July	17:30	Slovenia	3–1	Romania	15–25	25–13	25–22	25–16		90–76	Report
3 July	20:00	Belgium	3–1	Serbia	25–15	27–25	25–27	25–16		102–83	Report
5 July	12:00	Serbia	1–3	Slovenia	18–25	25–21	20–25	20–25		83–96	Report
5 July	14:30	Italy	3–0	Belgium	25–22	25–22	25–21			75–65	Report
5 July	17:30	Romania	3–1	Netherlands	26–24	24–26	25–23	25–15		100–88	Report
5 July	20:00	Croatia	1–3	Spain	17–25	24–26	25–18	22–25		88–94	Report
6 July	12:00	Netherlands	2–3	Belgium	20–25	25–21	25–14	18–25	11–15	99–100	Report
6 July	14:30	Spain	3–2	Slovenia	21–25	15–25	25–17	25–23	16–14	102–104	Report
6 July	17:30	Croatia	2–3	Romania	22–25	25–21	19–25	25–16	9–15	100–102	Report
6 July	20:00	Italy	3–0	Serbia	25–17	25–18	25–20			75–55	Report
8 July	12:00	Netherlands	1–3	Spain	25–23	22–25	12–25	25–27		84–100	Report
8 July	14:30	Serbia	0–3	Croatia	23–25	22–25	22–25			67–75	Report
8 July	17:30	Belgium	3–1	Romania	25–18	21–25	25–16	25–20		96–79	Report
8 July	20:00	Slovenia	3–1	Italy	15–25	25–20	25–22	25–22		90–89	Report
9 July	12:00	Belgium	3–1	Croatia	22–25	25–19	25–12	25–18		97–74	Report
9 July	14:30	Serbia	1–3	Spain	25–17	23–25	13–25	23–25		84–92	Report
9 July	17:30	Romania	0–3	Italy	22–25	20–25	16–25			58–75	Report
9 July	20:00	Slovenia	3–0	Netherlands	25–20	25–18	25–16			75–54	Report

=== Pool B ===
Pos	Team	Pld	W	L	Pts	SW	SL	SR	SPW	SPL	SPR	Qualification
1	Poland	7	6	1	18	20	7	2.857	635	510	1.245	Semifinals
2	Bulgaria	7	6	1	18	20	7	2.857	637	539	1.182	Semifinals
3	Germany	7	5	2	15	17	10	1.700	583	545	1.070	
4	Hungary	7	4	3	10	13	14	0.929	560	602	0.930	
5	Turkey	7	3	4	11	15	14	1.071	646	599	1.078	
6	Greece (H)	7	3	4	8	12	14	0.857	537	571	0.940	
7	Finland	7	1	6	4	7	18	0.389	532	599	0.888	
8	Lithuania	7	0	7	0	1	21	0.048	385	550	0.700	

Source: Report
(H) Host

Date	Time		Score		Set 1	Set 2	Set 3	Set 4	Set 5	Total	Report
1 July	12:00	Poland	3–0	Hungary	25–17	25–19	25–21			75–57	Report
1 July	14:30	Turkey	3–0	Finland	25–22	25–17	25–22			75–61	Report
1 July	17:30	Bulgaria	3–0	Germany	25–23	25–19	25–23			75–65	Report
1 July	20:00	Greece	3–0	Lithuania	25–20	25–8	25–17			75–45	Report
2 July	12:00	Hungary	3–2	Finland	24–26	25–21	22–25	29–27	15–11	115–110	Report
2 July	14:30	Poland	3–0	Lithuania	25–14	25–15	25–16			75–45	Report
2 July	20:00	Bulgaria	3–1	Turkey	25–22	25–21	19–25	25–23		94–91	Report
2 July	20:00	Germany	3–1	Greece	25–16	25–19	23–25	25–19		98–79	Report
3 July	12:00	Poland	2–3	Bulgaria	25–21	25–21	21–25	26–28	7–15	104–110	Report
3 July	14:30	Turkey	2–3	Germany	23–25	25–20	21–25	25–12	12–15	106–97	Report
3 July	17:30	Lithuania	0–3	Finland	22–25	15–25	23–25			60–75	Report
3 July	20:00	Greece	1–3	Hungary	18–25	20–25	25–22	13–25		76–97	Report
5 July	12:00	Hungary	1–3	Turkey	14–25	25–22	17–25	21–25		77–97	Report
5 July	14:30	Bulgaria	3–0	Lithuania	25–15	25–21	25–17			75–53	Report
5 July	17:30	Germany	2–3	Poland	9–25	25–20	8–25	25–23	9–15	76–108	Report
5 July	20:00	Finland	0–3	Greece	19–25	22–25	19–25			60–75	Report
6 July	12:00	Turkey	3–1	Lithuania	25–27	25–11	25–15	25–14		100–67	Report
6 July	14:30	Bulgaria	3–0	Finland	25–21	25–10	27–25			77–56	Report
6 July	17:30	Germany	3–0	Hungary	25–16	25–13	25–12			75–41	Report
6 July	20:00	Poland	3–0	Greece	25–19	25–19	25–17			75–55	Report
8 July	12:00	Finland	1–3	Germany	25–21	16–25	24–26	18–25		83–97	Report
8 July	14:30	Lithuania	0–3	Hungary	23–25	17–25	22–25			62–75	Report
8 July	17:30	Turkey	1–3	Poland	25–23	18–25	15–25	22–25		80–98	Report
8 July	20:00	Greece	1–3	Bulgaria	18–25	19–25	26–24	10–25		73–99	Report
9 July	12:00	Lithuania	0–3	Germany	19–25	14–25	20–25			53–75	Report
9 July	14:30	Hungary	3–2	Bulgaria	12–25	17–25	25–18	28–26	15–13	97–107	Report
9 July	17:30	Finland	1–3	Poland	27–25	19–25	20–25	21–25		87–100	Report
9 July	20:00	Greece	3–2	Turkey	22–25	25–19	17–25	25–18	15–10	104–97	Report

== Final round ==
Semifinals
12 July
Italy	2
Bulgaria	3
12 July
Poland	1
Belgium	3

Final
13 July
Bulgaria	3
Belgium	0
3rd place match
13 July
Italy	3
Poland	2

=== Semifinals ===
Date	Time		Score		Set 1	Set 2	Set 3	Set 4	Set 5	Total	Report
12 Jul	16:00	Italy	2–3	Bulgaria	20–25	25–23	20–25	25–17	16–18	106–108	Report
12 Jul	19:00	Poland	1–3	Belgium	14–25	25–23	19–25	24–26		82–99	Report

=== 3rd place match ===
Date	Time		Score		Set 1	Set 2	Set 3	Set 4	Set 5	Total	Report
13 Jul	16:00	Italy	3–2	Poland	18–25	25–17	25–16	20–25	15–9	103–92	Report

=== Final ===
Date	Time		Score		Set 1	Set 2	Set 3	Set 4	Set 5	Total	Report
13 Jul	19:00	Bulgaria	3–0	Belgium	25–15	25–18	28–26			78–59	Report

== Final standing ==
Rank	Team
1st place, gold medalist(s)	Bulgaria
2nd place, silver medalist(s)	Belgium
3rd place, bronze medalist(s)	Italy
4	Poland
5	Germany
6	Spain
7	Slovenia
8	Hungary
9	Turkey
10	Croatia
11	Greece
12	Romania
13	Netherlands
14	Finland
15	Serbia
16	Lithuania

Qualified for the 2025 U19 World Championship
Qualified for the 2025 U19 World Championship as hosts
Qualified for the 2025 U19 World Championship via FIVB World Ranking
