= Portugal women's national under-19 volleyball team =

Portugal U19
- Association: Federação Portuguesa de Voleibol
- Confederation: CEV

Uniforms
Home	Away	Third

FIVB U19 World Championship
- Appearances: 2 (First in 1991)
- Best result: 9th place : (1999)

Europe U18 / U17 Championship
- Appearances: No Appearances
- www.fpvoleibol.pt (in Portuguese)

The Portugal women's national under-19 volleyball team represents Portugal in international women's volleyball competitions and friendly matches under the age 19 and it is ruled and managed by the Federação Portuguesa de Voleibol That is an affiliate of Federation of International Volleyball FIVB and also a part of European Volleyball Confederation CEV.

== Results ==
=== Summer Youth Olympics ===
Champions Runners up Third place Fourth place

Youth Olympic Games
Year	Round	Position	Pld	W	L	SW	SL	Squad
(Singapore) 2010	Didn't qualify							
(China) 2014	No Volleyball Event							
(Argentina) 2018	No Volleyball Event							
Total	0 Titles	0/1						

=== FIVB U19 World Championship ===
Champions Runners up Third place Fourth place

FIVB U19 World Championship
Year	Round	Position	Pld	W	L	SW	SL	Squad
(Brazil) 1989	Didn't qualify							
(Portugal) 1991		11th place						Squad
(Czechoslovakia) 1993	Didn't qualify → ←							
(Thailand) 1997	Didn't qualify → ←							
(Portugal) 1999		9th place						Squad
(Croatia) 2001	Didn't qualify → ←							
(Mexico) 2021	Didn't qualify → ←							
Total	0 Titles	2/17						

=== Europe Girls' Youth Championship ===
Champions Runners up Third place Fourth place

Europe Girls' Youth Championship
Year	Round	Position	Pld	W	L	SW	SL	Squad
(Spain) 1995	Didn't qualify							
(Slovakia) 1997	Didn't qualify							
(Poland) 1999	Didn't qualify							
(Czech Republic) 2001	Didn't qualify							
(Croatia) 2003	Didn't qualify							
(Estonia) 2005	Didn't qualify							
(Czech Republic) 2007	Didn't qualify							
(Netherlands) 2009	Didn't qualify							
(Turkey) 2011	Didn't qualify							
2013 Q	Group Stages	4th Placed						Squad
2015 Q	Group Stages	Runners-up						Squad
2017 Q	Group Stages	Third Placed						Squad
2018 Q	Group Stages	Third Placed						Squad
2020 Q	Group Stages	7th Placed						Squad
2022 Q	Second Round	Third Placed						Squad
Total	0 Titles	0/13						

== Team ==
=== Current squad ===
The Following players is the Portuguese players that Competed in the 2018 Girls' U17 Volleyball European Championship

#	name	position	height	weight	birthday	spike	block
	Aguiar Carolina	libero	169	58	2002	240	210
	Almeida Diana	middle-blocker	178	68	2002	265	246
	Alves Adriana	outside-spiker	170	65	2003	275	280
	Amiguinho Beatriz	middle-blocker	192	85	2003	285	270
	Baiao Madalena	middle-blocker	185	83	2002	255	235
	Bras Mafalda	outside-spiker	177	63	2003	270	240
	Campos Rita	outside-spiker	170	50	2003	265	243
	Cavalcanti Amanda	middle-blocker	183	62	2002	284	260
	Clemente Alice	opposite	182	62	2003	278	243
	Elaerts Ana Beatriz	outside-spiker	178	68	2002	265	240
	Landau Beatriz	libero	173	63	2002	272	250
	Lopes Maria	outside-spiker	183	69	2002	260	250
	Monteiro Rita	libero	174	55	2003	255	250
	Moreira Mariana	opposite	177	62	2002	258	245
	Mouta Matilde	setter	172	57	2003	240	235
	Pardal Marisa	outside-spiker	173	59	2003	225	205
	Pereira Maria Francisca	setter	175	68	2002	255	255
	Pereira Marlene	middle-blocker	180	70	2002	280	265
	Pinho Sofia	setter	177	60	2002	265	260
	Silva Ana Rita	middle-blocker	181	77	2002	255	245
	Sousa Carolina	outside-spiker	170	61	2003	263	240
	Teixeira Matilde	outside-spiker	177	65	2003	275	270
	Vasco Ines	outside-spiker	178	66	2002	270	250
	Viegas Constanca	outside-spiker	180	63	2003	278	271
