= FIVB Volleyball Girls' U19 World Championship =

- Most recent season or competition: 2025 FIVB Volleyball Girls' U19 World Championship
- Sport: Volleyball
- Founded: 1989
- No. of teams: 24
- Continent: International (FIVB)
- Most recent champion: Bulgaria (1st title)
- Most titles: China (4 titles)

The FIVB Volleyball Girls' U19 World Championship is the world championship of volleyball for female players under the age of 19 organized by Fédération Internationale de Volleyball (FIVB). It was held in U18 age group until 2021.

The first edition was staged in 1989 in Curitiba, Brazil and tournaments have been played every two years since then. The most recent tournament was hosted by Croatia and Hungary and won by United States.

On 22 March 2022, the FIVB Board of Administration decided to change the age category of the tournament by moving it from U18 to U19 in order to equate it with the Boys' U19 World Championship.

China is the most successful nation in the tournament's history, with four titles and one runner-up. Brazil is the second most successful with three titles and four runners-up.

A corresponding tournament for male players is the FIVB Volleyball Boys' U19 World Championship.

== Results summary ==
#	Year	Host	Final			3rd place match			Teams
#	Year	Host	Champions	Score	Runners-up	3rd place	Score	4th place	Teams
1	1989; Details	(Brazil); Curitiba / Foz do Iguaçu	Soviet Union	3–2	Brazil	Japan	3–0	South Korea	12
2	1991; Details	(Portugal); Lisbon	South Korea	3–0	Brazil	Soviet Union	3–1	Japan	12
3	1993; Details	(Czechoslovakia); Bratislava	Russia	3–0	Japan	South Korea	3–2	Peru	12
4	1995; Details	(France); Orléans	Japan	3–1	Russia	Italy	3–0	Brazil	12
5	1997; Details	(Thailand); Chiang Mai	Brazil	3–0	Russia	Italy	3–0	South Korea	16
6	1999; Details	(Portugal); Funchal	Japan	3–0	Brazil	South Korea	3–1	Poland	16
7	2001; Details	(Croatia); Pula / Rijeka	China	3–1	Brazil	Poland	3–2	Italy	16
8	2003; Details	(Poland); Piła	China	3–2	Italy	Brazil	3–1	United States	16
9	2005; Details	Macau	Brazil	3–0	Russia	Italy	3–2	United States	16
10	2007; Details	(Mexico); Mexicali / Tijuana	China	3–1	Turkey	Russia	3–1	Serbia	16
11	2009; Details	(Thailand); Nakhon Ratchasima	Brazil	3–1	Serbia	Belgium	3–2	Turkey	16
12	2011; Details	(Turkey); Ankara	Turkey	3–0	China	Serbia	3–0	Poland	16
13	2013; Details	(Thailand); Nakhon Ratchasima	China	3–0	United States	Brazil	3–0	Peru	20
14	2015; Details	(Peru); Lima	Italy	3–0	United States	China	3–0	Turkey	20
15	2017; Details	(Argentina); Rosario / Santa Fe	Italy	3–1	Dominican Republic	Russia	3–1	Turkey	20
16	2019; Details	(Egypt); Cairo	United States	3–2	Italy	Brazil	3–1	China	20
17	2021; Details	(Mexico); Durango City	Russia	3–0	Italy	United States	3–1	Serbia	20
18	2023; Details	(Croatia) (Hungary); Osijek / Szeged	United States	3–2	Turkey	Italy	3–2	Japan	24
19	2025; Details	(Croatia) (Serbia); Osijek / Vrnjačka Banja / Trstenik	Bulgaria	3–1	United States	Poland	3–0	Turkey	24
20	2027; Details	(Kazakhstan); Astana							24

== Medal table ==
Rank	Nation	Gold	Silver	Bronze	Total
1	China	4	1	1	6
2	Brazil	3	4	3	10
3	Italy	2	3	4	9
4	Russia	2	3	2	7
5	United States	2	3	1	6
6	Japan	2	1	1	4
7	Turkey	1	2	0	3
8	South Korea	1	0	2	3
9	Soviet Union	1	0	1	2
10	Bulgaria	1	0	0	1
11	Serbia	0	1	1	2
12	Dominican Republic	0	1	0	1
13	Poland	0	0	2	2
14	Belgium	0	0	1	1
Totals (14 entries)		19	19	19	57

== Appearance ==
Team	(Brazil); 1989 (12)	(Portugal); 1991 (12)	(Czechoslovakia); 1993 (12)	(France); 1995 (12)	(Thailand); 1997 (16)	(Portugal); 1999 (16)	(Croatia); 2001 (15)	(Poland); 2003 (16)	(Macau); 2005 (16)	(Mexico); 2007 (16)	(Thailand); 2009 (16)	(Turkey); 2011 (16)	(Thailand); 2013 (20)	(Peru); 2015 (20)	(Argentina); 2017 (20)	(Egypt); 2019 (20)	(Mexico); 2021 (20)	(Croatia) (Hungary); 2023 (24)	(Croatia) (Serbia); 2025 (24)	Total
Algeria	•	12th	•	•	•	•	•	•	•	•	•	16th	20th	•	•	•	•	•	•	3
Argentina	9th	7th	•	•	9th	13th	9th	•	8th	•	•	8th	17th	10th	7th	12th	9th	9th	10th	14
Austria	•	•	•	•	•	•	•	•	13th	•	•	•	•	•	•	•	•	•	•	1
Belarus	•	•	•	•	•	•	13th	13th	9th	•	•	•	•	•	9th	17th	•	•	•	5
Belgium	•	•	•	•	•	•	•	•	•	6th	3rd	•	•	12th	•	•	•	•	14th	4
Brazil	2nd	2nd	5th	4th	1st	2nd	2nd	3rd	1st	5th	1st	6th	3rd	11th	10th	3rd	5th	7th	8th	19
Bulgaria	5th	6th	•	•	•	•	•	•	•	•	•	•	•	•	•	11th	17th	8th	1st	6
Cameroon	•	•	•	•	•	•	•	•	•	•	•	•	•	•	•	19th	19th	22nd	•	3
Canada	11th	•	•	•	•	•	•	•	•	•	•	•	•	•	•	14th	16th	19th	18th	5
Chile	•	•	•	•	•	•	•	•	•	•	•	•	•	•	•	•	•	23rd	19th	2
China	•	•	•	6th	•	5th	1st	1st	7th	1st	13th	2nd	1st	3rd	19th	4th	•	10th	6th	14
Chinese Taipei	•	•	•	•	•	13th	7th	9th	9th	•	•	•	11th	19th	•	•	•	•	11th	7
Colombia	•	•	•	•	•	•	•	•	•	•	•	•	•	•	14th	•	•	•	•	1
Croatia	•	•	•	•	•	8th	9th	5th	6th	•	•	•	•	•	•	•	•	5th	9th	6
Cuba	5th	•	7th	8th	8th	•	•	•	•	•	•	•	•	20th	20th	•	•	•	•	6
Czech Republic	•	•	8th	•	9th	9th	13th	9th	•	•	•	•	•	•	•	•	•	•	•	5
Czechoslovakia	•	5th	•	•	•	•	•	•	•	•	•	•	•	•	•	•	•	•	•	1
Dominican Republic	•	•	•	•	13th	•	8th	•	•	8th	11th	•	8th	17th	2nd	•	10th	13th	23rd	10
DR Congo	•	•	•	•	•	•	•	•	•	•	•	•	•	•	•	20th	•	•	•	1
Egypt	•	•	9th	•	•	•	•	13th	9th	•	15th	14th	15th	14th	•	10th	18th	16th	22nd	11
France	•	•	9th	9th	•	•	•	•	•	•	•	•	•	•	•	•	•	•	•	2
Germany	•	•	•	•	•	•	•	•	•	11th	10th	5th	•	6th	6th	•	•	21st	16th	7
Greece	•	•	•	•	•	•	•	•	•	•	•	•	12th	•	•	•	•	•	•	1
Hungary	•	•	•	•	•	•	•	13th	•	•	•	•	•	•	•	•	•	15th	•	2
Italy	•	•	•	3rd	3rd	7th	4th	2nd	3rd	12th	8th	11th	10th	1st	1st	2nd	2nd	3rd	5th	16
Japan	3rd	4th	2nd	1st	13th	1st	5th	•	•	7th	5th	7th	5th	9th	5th	5th	•	4th	7th	16
Kenya	•	•	•	•	•	•	13th	13th	•	•	•	•	•	•	•	•	•	•	•	2
Latvia	•	•	•	11th	•	•	•	•	•	•	•	•	•	•	•	•	•	•	•	1
Macau	•	•	•	•	•	•	•	•	13th	•	•	•	•	•	•	•	•	•	•	1
Mauritius	•	•	•	•	13th	13th	•	•	•	•	•	•	•	•	•	•	•	•	•	2
Mexico	•	•	9th	11th	•	•	•	•	•	13th	9th	12th	18th	15th	18th	18th	13th	18th	12th	12
Netherlands	•	•	•	•	9th	9th	•	•	•	•	•	•	•	•	•	•	•	•	•	2
New Zealand	11th	•	•	•	•	•	•	•	•	•	•	•	•	•	•	•	•	•	•	1
Nigeria	•	•	•	•	13th	•	•	•	•	•	•	•	•	•	•	•	19th	24th	•	3
Peru	7th	•	4th	•	•	•	•	•	•	14th	6th	•	4th	16th	12th	8th	14th	20th	21st	11
Poland	•	9th	•	•	7th	4th	3rd	8th	•	•	•	4th	7th	8th	16th	•	8th	12th	3rd	12
Portugal	•	11th	•	•	•	9th	•	•	•	•	•	•	•	•	•	•	•	•	•	2
Puerto Rico	•	10th	•	•	•	•	•	•	13th	15th	•	15th	14th	•	•	16th	15th	14th	20th	9
Romania	•	8th	9th	•	•	•	•	•	•	•	•	•	•	•	•	6th	6th	•	•	4
Russia	•	•	1st	2nd	2nd	9th	6th	7th	2nd	3rd	•	•	•	7th	3rd	7th	1st	•	•	12
Serbia	•	•	•	•	•	•	•	•	•	4th	2nd	3rd	6th	5th	13th	•	4th	17th	15th	9
Serbia and Montenegro	•	•	•	•	•	•	•	9th	•	•	•	•	•	•	•	•	•	•	•	1
Slovakia	•	•	•	7th	9th	•	•	•	•	•	14th	10th	•	•	•	•	12th	•	•	5
Slovenia	•	•	•	•	•	•	•	•	•	•	•	•	13th	•	15th	•	•	•	•	2
South Korea	4th	1st	3rd	5th	4th	3rd	9th	•	5th	9th	•	•	•	13th	11th	13th	•	11th	•	13
Soviet Union	1st	3rd	•	•	•	•	•	•	•	•	•	•	•	•	•	•	•	•	•	2
Spain	•	•	•	•	•	•	9th	•	•	•	•	•	•	•	•	•	•	•	17th	2
Thailand	•	•	•	•	5th	•	•	6th	•	•	7th	13th	16th	18th	17th	15th	11th	6th	13th	11
Tunisia	•	•	•	•	•	•	•	•	13th	16th	16th	•	19th	•	•	•	•	•	24th	5
Turkey	•	•	6th	•	•	13th	•	•	•	2nd	4th	1st	9th	4th	4th	9th	7th	2nd	4th	12
Ukraine	•	•	•	9th	6th	•	•	•	9th	•	•	•	•	•	•	•	•	•	•	3
United States	9th	•	•	•	•	6th	•	4th	4th	10th	12th	9th	2nd	2nd	8th	1st	3rd	1st	2nd	14
Uruguay	7th	•	•	•	•	•	•	•	•	•	•	•	•	•	•	•	•	•	•	1
Venezuela	•	•	•	•	•	•	•	9th	•	•	•	•	•	•	•	•	•	•	•	1

Legend

- 1st – Champions
- 2nd – Runners-up
- 3rd – Third place
- 4th – Fourth place
- • – Did not enter / Did not qualify
- – Hosts
- Q – Qualified for forthcoming tournament

== Most valuable player by edition ==
- 1989–95 – Not awarded
- 1997 – Érika Coimbra (BRA)
- 1999–2001 – Not awarded
- 2003 – Senna Ušić (CRO)
- 2005 – Natália Pereira (BRA)
- 2007 – Chen Zhan (CHN)
- 2009 – Samara Almeida (BRA)
- 2011 – Damla Çakıroğlu (TUR)
- 2013 – Yuan Xinyue (CHN)
- 2015 – Paola Egonu (ITA)
- 2017 – Elena Pietrini (ITA)
- 2019 – Jessica Mruzik (USA)
- 2021 – Natalia Suvorova (RUS)
- 2023 – Abby Vander Wal (USA)
- 2025 – Dimana Ivanova (BUL)

== See also ==
- FIVB Volleyball Boys' U19 World Championship
- FIVB Volleyball Women's World Championship
- FIVB Volleyball Women's U23 World Championship
- FIVB Volleyball Women's U21 World Championship
