= 2023 FIVB Volleyball Girls' U19 World Championship =

Tournament details
- Host country: Croatia; Hungary
- Cities: Osijek; Szeged
- Dates: 1–11 August 2023
- Teams: 24
- Venues: 2 (in 2 host cities)

Final positions
- Champions: United States (2nd title)
- Runners-up: Turkey
- Third place: Italy
- Fourth place: Japan

Tournament awards
- MVP: (United States) Abby Vander Wal
- Best Setter: (Italy) Ilaria Batte
- Best OH: (United States) Abby Vander Wal (United States) Teraya Sigler
- Best MB: (Croatia) Aurora Papac (Turkey) Begüm Kaçmaz
- Best OPP: (Turkey) Beren Yeşilırmak
- Best Libero: (Japan) Rin Nishikawa

Tournament statistics
- Matches played: 96
- Attendance: 9,618 (100 per match)

The 2023 FIVB Volleyball Girls' U19 World Championship was the 18th edition of the FIVB Volleyball Girls' U19 World Championship, the biennial international youth volleyball championship contested by the women's national teams under the age of 19 of the members associations of the Fédération Internationale de Volleyball (FIVB), the sport's global governing body. It was held in Croatia and Hungary from 1 to 11 August 2023.

This is the first edition with under-19 national teams after FIVB decided, in March 2022, to move the age category of the girls' championship from U18 to U19 in order to align it with the Boys' U19 World Championship. Athletes should be born on or after 1 January 2005. At same time, FIVB disqualified Russia, who would have been defending champions, and Belarus from future official events due to the Russo-Ukrainian War.

== Hosts selection ==
On 2 June 2022, FIVB opened the bidding process for member associations whose countries were interested in hosting one of the four Age Group World Championships in 2023 (i.e., Boys' and Girls' U19 World Championships and Men's and Women's U21 World Championships). The expression of interest of the member associations had to be submitted to FIVB by 29 July 2022, 18:00 CEST (UTC+2).

FIVB announced the hosts for its four Age Group World Championship on 24 January 2023, with the joint bid of Croatia and Hungary being selected to host the 2023 Girls' U19 World Championship. This will be the first time that the FIVB Girls' U19 World Championship is co-hosted by two countries and the second time that Croatia hosts the tournament having previously done in 2001. For its part, Hungary will host a FIVB tournament of any category for the first time.

== Qualification ==
Originally, a total of 20 national teams were going to qualify for the final tournament. However, in January 2023, FIVB confirmed an increase in participating teams from 20 to 24 in order to "facilitate the co-hosting".

In addition to Croatia and Hungary which qualified automatically as the hosts, 19 other teams qualified through five separate continental competitions which had to be completed by 31 December 2022 at the latest. The remaining 3 teams entered to the competition by the Girls' U19 FIVB World Ranking (excluding teams from the CEV) among the teams not yet qualified.

The slot allocation was set as follows:

- AVC (Asia & Oceania): 4
- CAVB (Africa): 2+1
- CEV (Europe): 6
- CSV (South America): 3+1
- NORCECA (North, Central America and Caribbean): 4+1
- Hosts: 1+1

Note

1. ^{†} Slots added after the hosts selection and the subsequent increase in number of participating teams.

Confederation	Qualifying tournament	Team qualified	Appearances			Previous best performance
Confederation	Qualifying tournament	Team qualified	Total	First	Last	Previous best performance
AVC (Asia & Oceania)	2022 Asian Girls' U18 Championship ( (Thailand) Nakhon Pathom, 6–23 June)	Japan	15th	1989	2019	Champions (1995, 1999)
AVC (Asia & Oceania)	2022 Asian Girls' U18 Championship ( (Thailand) Nakhon Pathom, 6–23 June)	China	13th	1995	2019	Champions (2001, 2003, 2007, 2013)
AVC (Asia & Oceania)	2022 Asian Girls' U18 Championship ( (Thailand) Nakhon Pathom, 6–23 June)	South Korea	13th	1989	2019	Champions (1991)
AVC (Asia & Oceania)	2022 Asian Girls' U18 Championship ( (Thailand) Nakhon Pathom, 6–23 June)	Thailand	10th	1997	2021	Fifth place (1997)
CAVB (Africa)	2022 Girls' African Nations Championship U19 ( (Nigeria) Abuja, 2–5 September)	Egypt	10th	1993	2021	Ninth place (1993, 2005)
CAVB (Africa)	2022 Girls' African Nations Championship U19 ( (Nigeria) Abuja, 2–5 September)	Cameroon	3rd	2019	2021	Nineteenth place (2019, 2021)
CAVB (Africa)	Girls' U19 FIVB World Ranking	Nigeria	3rd	1997	2021	Thirteenth place (1997)
CEV (Europe)	2022 Girls' U17 European Championship ( (Czech Republic) Hradec Králové, 16–24 July)	Italy	15th	1995	2021	Champions (2015, 2017)
CEV (Europe)	2022 Girls' U17 European Championship ( (Czech Republic) Hradec Králové, 16–24 July)	Turkey	11th	1993	2021	Champions (2011)
CEV (Europe)	2022 Girls' U17 European Championship ( (Czech Republic) Hradec Králové, 16–24 July)	Germany	6th	2007	2017	Fifth place (2011)
CEV (Europe)	2022 Girls' U17 European Championship ( (Czech Republic) Hradec Králové, 16–24 July)	Serbia	9th	2003	2021	Runners-up (2009)
CEV (Europe)	2022 Girls' U17 European Championship ( (Czech Republic) Hradec Králové, 16–24 July)	Poland	11th	1991	2021	Third place (2001)
CEV (Europe)	2022 Girls' U17 European Championship ( (Czech Republic) Hradec Králové, 16–24 July)	Bulgaria	5th	1989	2021	Fifth place (1989)
CEV (Europe)	Host nations	Croatia	5th	1999	2005	Fifth place (2003)
CEV (Europe)	Host nations	Hungary	2nd	2003	2003	Thirteenth place (2003)
CSV (South America)	2022 Girls' U19 South American Championship ( (Bolivia) La Paz, 2–7 October)	Argentina	13th	1989	2021	Seventh place (1991, 2017)
CSV (South America)	2022 Girls' U19 South American Championship ( (Bolivia) La Paz, 2–7 October)	Brazil	18th (all)	1989	2021	Champions (1997, 2005, 2009)
CSV (South America)	2022 Girls' U19 South American Championship ( (Bolivia) La Paz, 2–7 October)	Chile	1st	Debut		None
CSV (South America)	Girls' U19 FIVB World Ranking	Peru	10th	1989	2021	Fourth place (1993, 2013)
NORCECA (North, Central America and Caribbean)	2022 Girls' Youth Pan-American Cup ( (United States) Tulsa, 18–23 July)	United States	13th	1989	2021	Champions (2019)
NORCECA (North, Central America and Caribbean)	2022 Girls' Youth Pan-American Cup ( (United States) Tulsa, 18–23 July)	Dominican Republic	9th	1997	2021	Runners-up (2017)
NORCECA (North, Central America and Caribbean)	2022 Girls' Youth Pan-American Cup ( (United States) Tulsa, 18–23 July)	Puerto Rico	8th	1991	2021	Tenth place (1991)
NORCECA (North, Central America and Caribbean)	2022 Girls' Youth Pan-American Cup ( (United States) Tulsa, 18–23 July)	Mexico	11th	1993	2021	Ninth place (1993, 2009)
NORCECA (North, Central America and Caribbean)	Girls' U19 FIVB World Ranking	Canada	4th	1989	2021	Eleventh place (1989)

== Pools composition ==
The draw for the pools composition was held on 31 March 2023 at the FIVB headquarters in Lausanne, Switzerland. The 24 teams were split into four pools of six. The hosts Croatia and Hungary and the top six teams of the Girls' U19 FIVB World Ranking in force at that time (as of 24 October 2022) were seeded in the first two positions of each pool following the serpentine system. FIVB reserved the right to seed the host teams as heads of pools A and B regardless of their position in the World Ranking. The remaining 16 teams were divided into four pots of four, according to their position in the same Girls' U19 FIVB World Ranking, in order to be drawn to complete the following four positions in each pool.

Girls' U19 FIVB World Ranking of each team as of 24 October 2022 are shown in brackets, except the hosts Hungary and Croatia who ranked 35th and 36th, respectively.

Seeded teams		Teams to be drawn			
Line 1	Line 2	Pot 1 (line 3)	Pot 2 (line 4)	Pot 3 (line 5)	Pot 4 (line 6)
Hungary (Hosts, assigned to A1); Croatia (Hosts, assigned to B1); Italy (1), assigned to C1; United States (2), assigned to D1	Serbia (4), assigned to D2; Brazil (5), assigned to C2; Turkey (6), assigned to B2; Argentina (7), assigned to A2	Dominican Republic (9); Poland (10); Egypt (11); Thailand (12)	Puerto Rico (13); Cameroon (14); Mexico (15); Peru (16)	Japan (17); Nigeria (18); China (19); Canada (20)	Chile (20); South Korea (21); Germany (22); Bulgaria (24)

The draw procedure also followed the serpentine system and was as follows:

- Teams from pot 1 were drawn first and were placed in line 3 of each pool starting from pool A to pool D.
- Teams from pot 2 were then drawn and placed in line 4 of each pool starting from pool D to pool A.
- Teams from pot 3 were then drawn and placed in line 5 of each pool starting from pool A to pool D.
- Teams from pot 4 were drawn at the end and were placed in line 6 of each pool starting from pool D to pool A.

The pools composition after the draw was as follow:

Pool A
Pos	Team
A1	Hungary
A2	Argentina
A3	Egypt
A4	Cameroon
A5	China
A6	Chile

Pool B
Pos	Team
B1	Croatia
B2	Turkey
B3	Dominican Republic
B4	Puerto Rico
B5	Nigeria
B6	Germany

Pool C
Pos	Team
C1	Italy
C2	Brazil
C3	Thailand
C4	Peru
C5	Canada
C6	Bulgaria

Pool D
Pos	Team
D1	United States
D2	Serbia
D3	Poland
D4	Mexico
D5	Japan
D6	South Korea

== Preliminary round ==
=== Pool A ===
Pos	Team	Pld	W	L	Pts	SW	SL	SR	SPW	SPL	SPR	Qualification
1	China	5	5	0	15	15	0	MAX	375	229	1.638	Round of 16
2	Argentina	5	4	1	11	12	5	2.400	384	340	1.129	Round of 16
3	Hungary	5	3	2	9	11	8	1.375	407	383	1.063	Round of 16
4	Egypt	5	2	3	7	8	9	0.889	369	365	1.011	Round of 16
5	Chile	5	1	4	3	3	13	0.231	293	376	0.779	17th–24th places
6	Cameroon	5	0	5	0	1	15	0.067	250	395	0.633	17th–24th places

Date	Time		Score		Set 1	Set 2	Set 3	Set 4	Set 5	Total	Report
01 Aug	15:00	Argentina	0–3	China	12–25	18–25	20–25			50–75	P2 Report
01 Aug	18:00	Hungary	3–0	Chile	25–17	25–11	25–18			75–46	P2 Report
01 Aug	21:00	Egypt	3–0	Cameroon	25–20	25–13	25–17			75–50	P2 Report
02 Aug	15:00	Egypt	3–0	Chile	25–15	25–19	25–21			75–55	P2 Report
02 Aug	18:00	Hungary	0–3	China	22–25	20–25	17–25			59–75	P2 Report
02 Aug	21:00	Argentina	3–0	Cameroon	25–16	25–19	25–12			75–47	P2 Report
03 Aug	15:00	China	3–0	Chile	25–18	25–14	25–10			75–42	P2 Report
03 Aug	18:00	Hungary	3–0	Cameroon	25–17	25–20	25–15			75–52	P2 Report
03 Aug	21:00	Egypt	0–3	Argentina	30–32	20–25	18–25			68–82	P2 Report
05 Aug	15:00	Argentina	3–0	Chile	25–22	25–15	25–18			75–55	P2 Report
05 Aug	18:00	Hungary	3–2	Egypt	20–25	18–25	25–23	25–22	15–13	103–108	P2 Report
05 Aug	21:00	Cameroon	0–3	China	14–25	12–25	9–25			35–75	P2 Report
06 Aug	15:00	Egypt	0–3	China	11–25	18–25	14–25			43–75	P2 Report
06 Aug	18:00	Hungary	2–3	Argentina	20–25	20–25	25–22	25–15	5–15	95–102	P2 Report
06 Aug	21:00	Cameroon	1–3	Chile	25–20	19–25	17–25	15–25		76–95	P2 Report

=== Pool B ===
Pos	Team	Pld	W	L	Pts	SW	SL	SR	SPW	SPL	SPR	Qualification
1	Turkey	5	5	0	15	15	0	MAX	375	208	1.803	Round of 16
2	Croatia	5	4	1	12	12	5	2.400	397	295	1.346	Round of 16
3	Puerto Rico	5	2	3	6	8	9	0.889	371	328	1.131	Round of 16
4	Dominican Republic	5	2	3	6	8	10	0.800	393	339	1.159	Round of 16
5	Germany	5	2	3	6	6	10	0.600	322	313	1.029	17th–24th places
6	Nigeria (Note: Nigeria withdrew due to visa issues.)	5	0	5	0	0	15	0.000	0	375	0.000	17th–24th places

Notes:

Date	Time		Score		Set 1	Set 2	Set 3	Set 4	Set 5	Total	Report
01 Aug	18:00	Croatia	3–0	Germany	25–16	25–16	25–22			75–54	P2 Report
01 Aug	21:00	Dominican Republic	3–1	Puerto Rico	25–21	21–25	25–13	25–22		96–81	P2 Report
02 Aug	15:00	Turkey	3–0	Puerto Rico	25–18	25–20	25–16			75–54	P2 Report
02 Aug	21:00	Dominican Republic	1–3	Germany	24–26	25–15	16–25	23–25		88–91	P2 Report
03 Aug	15:00	Turkey	3–0	Dominican Republic	25–19	25–20	25–15			75–54	P2 Report
03 Aug	18:00	Croatia	3–1	Puerto Rico	23–25	25–21	25–20	25–20		98–86	P2 Report
05 Aug	18:00	Croatia	3–1	Dominican Republic	25–21	25–15	17–25	25–19		92–80	P2 Report
05 Aug	21:00	Turkey	3–0	Germany	25–11	25–13	25–19			75–43	P2 Report
06 Aug	18:00	Puerto Rico	3–0	Germany	25–22	25–22	25–15			75–59	P2 Report
06 Aug	21:00	Croatia	0–3	Turkey	20–25	19–25	18–25			57–75	P2 Report

Forfeited Nigeria games due to their withdrawal:

Date	Time		Score		Set 1	Set 2	Set 3	Set 4	Set 5	Total	Report
01 Aug	15:00	Turkey	3–0	Nigeria	25–0	25–0	25–0			75–0	Report
02 Aug	18:00	Croatia	3–0	Nigeria	25–0	25–0	25–0			75–0	Report
03 Aug	21:00	Germany	3–0	Nigeria	25–0	25–0	25–0			75–0	Report
05 Aug	15:00	Puerto Rico	3–0	Nigeria	25–0	25–0	25–0			75–0	Report
06 Aug	15:00	Dominican Republic	3–0	Nigeria	25–0	25–0	25–0			75–0	Report

=== Pool C ===
Pos	Team	Pld	W	L	Pts	SW	SL	SR	SPW	SPL	SPR	Qualification
1	Italy	5	5	0	15	15	3	5.000	451	353	1.278	Round of 16
2	Bulgaria	5	4	1	12	13	4	3.250	393	352	1.116	Round of 16
3	Brazil	5	3	2	9	11	6	1.833	409	349	1.172	Round of 16
4	Thailand	5	2	3	6	6	10	0.600	339	343	0.988	Round of 16
5	Peru	5	1	4	2	4	14	0.286	325	430	0.756	17th–24th places
6	Canada	5	0	5	1	3	15	0.200	324	426	0.761	17th–24th places

Date	Time		Score		Set 1	Set 2	Set 3	Set 4	Set 5	Total	Report
01 Aug	15:05	Italy	3–1	Bulgaria	25–15	25–19	23–25	25–9		98–68	P2 Report
01 Aug	18:05	Brazil	3–0	Canada	25–23	25–11	25–16			75–50	P2 Report
01 Aug	21:05	Thailand	3–0	Peru	25–10	29–27	25–9			79–46	P2 Report
02 Aug	15:05	Italy	3–0	Canada	25–12	25–14	25–19			75–45	P2 Report
02 Aug	18:05	Brazil	3–0	Peru	25–13	25–17	25–16			75–46	P2 Report
02 Aug	21:05	Thailand	0–3	Bulgaria	22–25	20–25	20–25			62–75	P2 Report
03 Aug	15:05	Italy	3–1	Peru	25–18	22–25	25–17	25–15		97–75	P2 Report
03 Aug	18:05	Brazil	3–0	Thailand	25–13	25–21	25–15			75–49	P2 Report
03 Aug	21:05	Canada	0–3	Bulgaria	14–25	25–27	14–25			53–77	P2 Report
05 Aug	15:05	Italy	3–0	Thailand	25–17	25–17	25–19			75–53	P2 Report
05 Aug	18:05	Brazil	1–3	Bulgaria	12–25	20–25	25–21	25–27		82–98	P2 Report
05 Aug	21:05	Peru	3–2	Canada	25–20	22–25	16–25	25–22	15–12	103–104	P2 Report
06 Aug	15:05	Italy	3–1	Brazil	25–27	26–24	25–23	30–28		106–102	P2 Report
06 Aug	18:05	Thailand	3–1	Canada	25–11	21–25	25–22	25–14		96–72	P2 Report
06 Aug	21:05	Peru	0–3	Bulgaria	22–25	16–25	19–25			57–75	P2 Report

=== Pool D ===
Pos	Team	Pld	W	L	Pts	SW	SL	SR	SPW	SPL	SPR	Qualification
1	United States	5	5	0	13	15	5	3.000	458	398	1.151	Round of 16
2	Japan	5	4	1	11	12	7	1.714	440	381	1.155	Round of 16
3	Poland	5	3	2	8	11	9	1.222	436	420	1.038	Round of 16
4	South Korea	5	2	3	6	9	11	0.818	427	441	0.968	Round of 16
5	Serbia	5	1	4	7	11	12	0.917	466	479	0.973	17th–24th places
6	Mexico	5	0	5	0	1	15	0.067	289	397	0.728	17th–24th places

Date	Time		Score		Set 1	Set 2	Set 3	Set 4	Set 5	Total	Report
01 Aug	15:00	United States	3–2	South Korea	25–21	19–25	25–21	23–25	15–10	107–102	P2 Report
01 Aug	18:00	Serbia	2–3	Japan	23–25	25–20	20–25	25–20	12–15	105–105	P2 Report
01 Aug	21:00	Poland	3–1	Mexico	25–11	25–19	20–25	27–25		97–80	P2 Report
02 Aug	15:00	United States	3–0	Japan	25–22	25–20	26–24			76–66	P2 Report
02 Aug	18:00	Serbia	3–0	Mexico	25–18	25–21	25–17			75–56	P2 Report
02 Aug	21:00	Poland	3–0	South Korea	25–19	25–23	25–16			75–58	P2 Report
03 Aug	15:00	United States	3–0	Mexico	25–19	25–22	25–20			75–61	P2 Report
03 Aug	18:00	Poland	3–2	Serbia	25–13	25–13	22–25	19–25	15–13	106–89	P2 Report
03 Aug	21:00	Japan	3–1	South Korea	24–26	25–18	25–19	25–19		99–82	P2 Report
05 Aug	15:00	Mexico	0–3	Japan	14–25	11–25	13–25			38–75	P2 Report
05 Aug	18:00	Serbia	2–3	South Korea	25–27	16–25	25–13	25–19	11–15	102–99	P2 Report
05 Aug	21:00	United States	3–1	Poland	23–25	25–16	25–22	25–15		98–78	P2 Report
06 Aug	15:00	Mexico	0–3	South Korea	16–25	16–25	22–25			54–75	P2 Report
06 Aug	18:00	United States	3–2	Serbia	25–15	18–25	25–19	19–25	15–7	102–91	P2 Report
06 Aug	21:00	Poland	1–3	Japan	25–20	19–25	15–25	21–25		80–95	P2 Report

== Final round ==
- All times are local (UTC+02:00).

=== 17th–24th places ===
17th–24th quarterfinals
7 Aug
Chile	1
Canada	3
7 Aug
Mexico	3
Germany	0
7 Aug
Peru	3
Cameroon	0
7 Aug
Serbia	3
Nigeria	0

17th–20th semifinals
9 Aug
Canada	0
Mexico	3
9 Aug
Peru	0
Serbia	3

17th place match
10 Aug
Mexico	0
Serbia	3
19th place match
10 Aug
Canada	3
Peru	0

21st–23rd semifinals
9 Aug
Chile	2
Germany	3
9 Aug
Cameroon	3
Nigeria	0

21st place match
10 Aug
Germany	3
Cameroon	0
23rd place match
10 Aug
Chile	3
Nigeria	0

==== 17th–24th quarterfinals ====
Date	Time		Score		Set 1	Set 2	Set 3	Set 4	Set 5	Total	Report
7 Aug	17:00	Germany	0–3	Mexico	19–25	22–25	24–26			65–76	P2 Report
7 Aug	20:00	Serbia	3–0	Nigeria	25–0	25–0	25–0			75–0	Report
7 Aug	21:00	Chile	1–3	Canada	19–25	25–27	25–16	23–25		92–93	P2 Report
7 Aug	21:05	Peru	3–0	Cameroon	25–18	25–18	25–22			75–58	P2 Report

==== 21st–24th semifinals ====
Date	Time		Score		Set 1	Set 2	Set 3	Set 4	Set 5	Total	Report
9 Aug	21:00	Cameroon	3–0	Nigeria	25–0	25–0	25–0			75–0	Report
9 Aug	21:05	Chile	2–3	Germany	25–22	12–25	19–25	25–20	11–15	92–107	P2 Report

==== 17th–20th semifinals ====
Date	Time		Score		Set 1	Set 2	Set 3	Set 4	Set 5	Total	Report
9 Aug	17:00	Canada	0–3	Mexico	21–25	15–25	23–25			59–75	P2 Report
9 Aug	20:00	Peru	0–3	Serbia	12–25	19–25	18–25			49–75	P2 Report

==== 23rd place match ====
Date	Time		Score		Set 1	Set 2	Set 3	Set 4	Set 5	Total	Report
10 Aug	21:05	Nigeria	0–3	Chile	0–25	0–25	0–25			0–75	Report

==== 21st place match ====
Date	Time		Score		Set 1	Set 2	Set 3	Set 4	Set 5	Total	Report
10 Aug	21:00	Cameroon	0–3	Germany	11–25	15–25	17–25			43–75	P2 Report

==== 19th place match ====
Date	Time		Score		Set 1	Set 2	Set 3	Set 4	Set 5	Total	Report
10 Aug	17:00	Canada	3–0	Peru	25–21	25–20	25–21			75–62	P2 Report

==== 17th place match ====
Date	Time		Score		Set 1	Set 2	Set 3	Set 4	Set 5	Total	Report
10 Aug	20:00	Mexico	0–3	Serbia	26–28	17–25	23–25			66–78	P2 Report

=== Eighth Finals ===
Eighth Finals
7 Aug
United States	3
Dominican Republic	0
7 Aug
Argentina	1
Brazil	3
7 Aug
Italy	3
Egypt	0
7 Aug
Poland	2
Croatia	3
7 Aug
Bulgaria	3
Hungary	0
7 Aug
Turkey	3
South Korea	2
7 Aug
Japan	3
Puerto Rico	0
7 Aug
China	2
Thailand	3

Quarterfinals
9 Aug
United States	3
Brazil	2
9 Aug
Italy	3
Croatia	2
9 Aug
Bulgaria	1
Turkey	3
9 Aug
Japan	3
Thailand	2

Semifinals
10 Aug
United States	3
Italy	1
10 Aug
Turkey	3
Japan	0

Final
11 Aug
United States	3
Turkey	2
3rd place match
11 Aug
Italy	3
Japan	2

==== Eighth Finals ====
Date	Time		Score		Set 1	Set 2	Set 3	Set 4	Set 5	Total	Report
7 Aug	12:00	United States	3–0	Dominican Republic	25–15	25–15	26–24			76–54	P2 Report
7 Aug	15:00	China	2–3	Thailand	33–31	25–16	16–25	17–25	12–15	103–112	P2 Report
7 Aug	15:00	Turkey	3–2	South Korea	25–16	23–25	20–25	25–21	15–10	108–97	P2 Report
7 Aug	15:05	Italy	3–0	Egypt	25–15	25–21	25–9			75–45	P2 Report
7 Aug	18:00	Bulgaria	3–0	Hungary	25–17	25–19	25–18			75–54	P2 Report
7 Aug	18:00	Croatia	3–2	Poland	21–25	25–10	14–25	25–19	16–14	101–93	P2 Report
7 Aug	18:05	Argentina	1–3	Brazil	15–25	21–25	25–15	19–25		80–90	P2 Report
7 Aug	21:00	Japan	3–0	Puerto Rico	25–18	25–21	25–21			75–60	P2 Report

=== 9th–16th places ===
9th–16th quarterfinals
9 Aug
Dominican Republic	0
Argentina	3
9 Aug
Egypt	1
Poland	3
9 Aug
Hungary	2
South Korea	3
9 Aug
Puerto Rico	1
China	3

9th–12th semifinals
10 Aug
Argentina	3
Poland	2
10 Aug
South Korea	1
China	3

9th place match
Argentina	3
China	0
11th place match
Poland	0
South Korea	3

13th–15th semifinals
10 Aug
Egypt	2
Dominican Republic	3
10 Aug
Hungary	1
Puerto Rico	3

13th place match
11 Aug
Dominican Republic	3
Puerto Rico	2
15th place match
11 Aug
Egypt	1
Hungary	3

==== 9th–16th quarterfinals ====
Date	Time		Score		Set 1	Set 2	Set 3	Set 4	Set 5	Total	Report
9 Aug	15:00	Egypt	1–3	Poland	12–25	27–25	17–25	17–25		73–100	P2 Report
9 Aug	15:05	China	3–1	Puerto Rico	25–23	25–21	17–25	25–20		92–89	P2 Report
9 Aug	18:00	Hungary	2–3	South Korea	22–25	25–16	18–25	25–17	14–16	104–99	P2 Report
9 Aug	18:05	Dominican Republic	0–3	Argentina	22–25	23–25	20–25			65–75	P2 Report

==== 13th–16th semifinals ====
Date	Time		Score		Set 1	Set 2	Set 3	Set 4	Set 5	Total	Report
10 Aug	15:00	Egypt	2–3	Dominican Republic	25–21	17–25	20–25	25–13	13–15	100–99	P2 Report
10 Aug	15:05	Hungary	1–3	Puerto Rico	25–27	23–25	25–17	23–25		96–94	P2 Report

==== 9th–12th semifinals ====
Date	Time		Score		Set 1	Set 2	Set 3	Set 4	Set 5	Total	Report
10 Aug	18:00	Poland	2–3	Argentina	25–19	23–25	21–25	25–21	8–15	102–105	Report
10 Aug	18:05	South Korea	1–3	China	25–18	17–25	21–25	24–26		87–94	P2 Report

==== 15th place match ====
Date	Time		Score		Set 1	Set 2	Set 3	Set 4	Set 5	Total	Report
11 Aug	15:05	Hungary	3–1	Egypt	25–18	23–25	25–17	25–12		98–72	P2 Report

==== 13th place match ====
Date	Time		Score		Set 1	Set 2	Set 3	Set 4	Set 5	Total	Report
11 Aug	18:05	Puerto Rico	2–3	Dominican Republic	25–20	25–22	18–25	18–25	12–15	98–107	P2 Report

==== 11th place match ====
Date	Time		Score		Set 1	Set 2	Set 3	Set 4	Set 5	Total	Report
11 Aug	15:00	Poland	0–3	South Korea	21–25	18–25	23–25			62–75	P2 Report

==== 9th place match ====
Date	Time		Score		Set 1	Set 2	Set 3	Set 4	Set 5	Total	Report
11 Aug	18:00	China	0–3	Argentina	23–25	19–25	21–25			63–75	P2 Report

==== Quarterfinals ====
Date	Time		Score		Set 1	Set 2	Set 3	Set 4	Set 5	Total	Report
9 Aug	12:00	Japan	3–2	Thailand	25–20	20–25	25–20	27–29	15–10	112–104	P2 Report
9 Aug	15:00	Bulgaria	1–3	Turkey	22–25	25–27	25–22	7–25		79–99	P2 Report
9 Aug	18:00	Italy	3–2	Croatia	22–25	21–25	25–20	25–14	15–13	108–97	P2 Report
9 Aug	21:00	United States	3–2	Brazil	21–25	25–19	25–19	23–25	15–11	109–99	P2 Report

=== 5th–8th places ===
5th–8th semifinals
10 Aug
Brazil	2
Croatia	3
10 Aug
Bulgaria	1
Thailand	3

5th place match
11 Aug
Croatia	3
Thailand	0
7th place match
11 Aug
Brazil	3
Bulgaria	1

==== 5th–8th semifinals ====
Date	Time		Score		Set 1	Set 2	Set 3	Set 4	Set 5	Total	Report
10 Aug	12:00	Bulgaria	1–3	Thailand	16–25	19–25	25–16	18–25		78–91	P2 Report
10 Aug	18:00	Croatia	3–2	Brazil	25–17	18–25	22–25	25–19	15–11	105–97	P2 Report

==== 7th place match ====
Date	Time		Score		Set 1	Set 2	Set 3	Set 4	Set 5	Total	Report
11 Aug	12:00	Brazil	3–1	Bulgaria	25–23	25–16	25–27	25–19		100–85	P2 Report

==== 5th place match ====
Date	Time		Score		Set 1	Set 2	Set 3	Set 4	Set 5	Total	Report
11 Aug	15:00	Croatia	3–0	Thailand	25–15	25–19	25–23			75–57	P2 Report

=== Final Four ===
==== Semifinals ====
Date	Time		Score		Set 1	Set 2	Set 3	Set 4	Set 5	Total	Report
10 Aug	15:00	Turkey	3–0	Japan	25–16	25–12	25–19			75–47	P2 Report
10 Aug	21:00	Italy	1–3	United States	18–25	22–25	25–20	15–25		80–95	P2 Report

==== 3rd place match ====
Date	Time		Score		Set 1	Set 2	Set 3	Set 4	Set 5	Total	Report
11 Aug	18:00	Italy	3–2	Japan	19–25	25–14	22–25	25–23	16–14	107–101	P2 Report

==== Final ====
Date	Time		Score		Set 1	Set 2	Set 3	Set 4	Set 5	Total	Report
11 Aug	21:00	United States	3–2	Turkey	20–25	23–25	25–22	25–16	15–10	108–98	P2 Report

== Final standing ==
Rank	Team
1st place, gold medalist(s)	United States
2nd place, silver medalist(s)	Turkey
3rd place, bronze medalist(s)	Italy
4	Japan
5	Croatia
6	Thailand
7	Brazil
8	Bulgaria
9	Argentina
10	China
11	South Korea
12	Poland
13	Dominican Republic
14	Puerto Rico
15	Hungary
16	Egypt
17	Serbia
18	Mexico
19	Canada
20	Peru
21	Germany
22	Cameroon
23	Chile
24	Nigeria

2025 FIVB Volleyball Girls' U18 World champions

United States
Second title

== See also ==
- 2023 FIVB Volleyball Women's U21 World Championship
- 2023 FIVB Volleyball Boys' U19 World Championship
- 2023 FIVB Volleyball Men's U21 World Championship
