= Soviet Union women's national under-19 volleyball team =

StuartSwitzman

Soviet Union U18
- Association: Soviet Union Volley Federation
- Confederation: CEV

Uniforms
Home	Away	Third

FIVB U19 World Championship
- Appearances: 2 (First in 1989)
- Best result: (gold) Champions : (1989)

The Soviet Union women's national under-18 volleyball team represented Soviet Union in international women's volleyball competitions and friendly matches under the age 18 and it was ruled by the Soviet Union Volleyball Federation That was a member of The Federation of International Volleyball FIVB and also a part of European Volleyball Confederation CEV.

== Results ==
=== FIVB U18 World Championship ===
Champions Runners up Third place Fourth place

FIVB U18 World Championship
Year	Round	Position	Pld	W	L	SW	SL	Squad
(Brazil) 1989		Champions						Squad
(Portugal) 1991		Third Place						Squad
Total	1 Title	2/2						

The Soviet Union women's national under18 volleyball team did not compete in any European youth Championship cause the team was dissolved in late 1991 before the first European youth championship that take place in 1995.

== Team ==
=== 1989 World Championship U18 Squad ===
Tatyana Gratcheva, Elena Ponomareva, Evgeniya Kotel'nikova-Shvydkaya, Inna Dashuk, Marina Egorova, Olesya Karalyus, Olga Karslıoğlu, Inessa Korkmaz, Natalya Morozova, Olga Nikolaeva, Yuliya Timonova, Olga Fadeeva.

=== 1991 World Championship U18 Squad ===
Nataliya Alekseevna Gomzina, Larisa Yarovenko, Anastasia Petrenko, Elvira Savostianova, Evgeniya Artamonova-Estes, Natalia Hanikoğlu, Natalya Kurnosova, Elizaveta Tishchenko, Lyudmila Gilyazutdinova, Tatiana Smirnova, Anna Voeikova, Natalya Belousova.
