= Czechoslovakia women's national under-19 volleyball team =

Czechoslovakia U18
- Association: Czechoslovak Volley Federation
- Confederation: CEV

Uniforms
Home	Away	Third

Youth Olympic Games
- Appearances: No Appearances

FIVB U19 World Championship
- Appearances: 1 (First in 1991)
- Best result: 5th place : (1991)

Europe U18 / U17 Championship
- Appearances: No Appearances
- www.cvf.cz (in Czech)

The Czechoslovakia women's national under-18 volleyball team represented Czechoslovakia in international women's volleyball competitions and friendly matches under the age 18 and it was ruled by the Czechoslovak Volleyball Federation That was a member of The Federation of International Volleyball FIVB and also a part of European Volleyball Confederation CEV.

== Results ==
=== FIVB U18 World Championship ===
Champions Runners up Third place Fourth place

FIVB U18 World Championship
Year	Round	Position	Pld	W	L	SW	SL	Squad
(Brazil) 1989	Didn't Qualify							
(Portugal) 1991		5th Place						Squad
Total	0 Titles	1/2						

The Czechoslovakia women's national under18 volleyball team didn't compete in any European youth Championship cause the team was dissolved in late 1992 before the first European youth championship that take place in 1995.
