= Senna Ušić Jogunica =

Croatian volleyball player (born 1986)

Senna Ušić
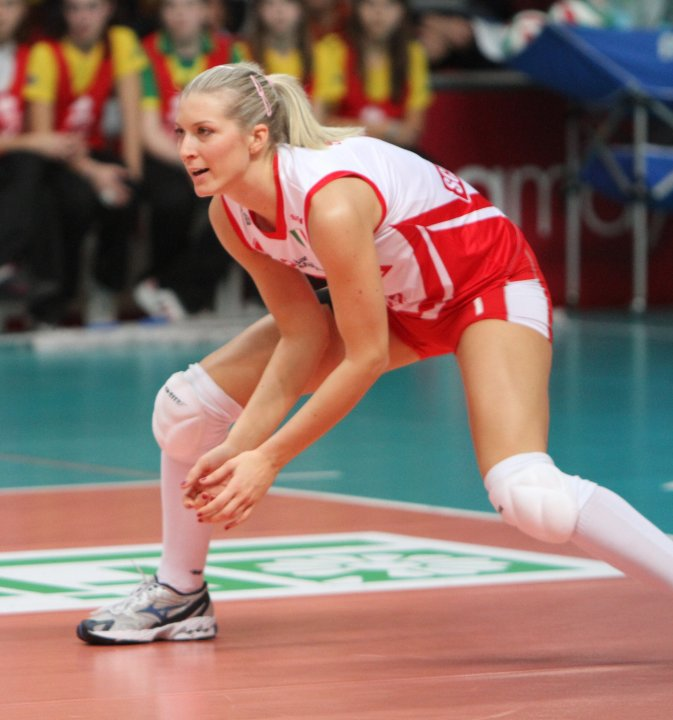

Personal information
- Full name: Senna Ušic Jogunica
- Nationality: Croatian
- Born: Senna Ušić; 14 May 1986 (age 40); Zagreb
- Height: 1.90 m (6 ft 3 in)
- Weight: 78 kg (172 lb)

Volleyball information
- Position: outside hitter

Career
Years	Teams
2010; 2014; 2015	Scavolini Pesaro; Eczacıbaşı Istanbul; Shanghai

National team
2000–2015	Croatia
Medal record
Women's volleyball
Representing Croatia
Mediterranean Games
Bronze medal – third place	2009 Pescara	Team

Senna Ušić Jogunica (born 14 May 1986) is a Croatian volleyball player. She is a member of the Croatia women's national volleyball team and played for Eczacıbaşı Istanbul in 2014.

== Career ==
She was part of the Croatian national team at the 2010 FIVB Volleyball Women's World Championship in Japan. at the 2014 FIVB Volleyball Women's World Championship in Italy, and at the 2015 FIVB World Grand Prix.

Ušić-Jogunica took part in the 2003 Youth European champion and was 2004 Croatian national cup champion with Ok Azena. With Pallavolo Sirio Perugia, she won the 2005 CEV European Champions League, 2005 Italian national cup, 2006 Italian supercup, 2006 Italian national cup, 2006 Italian national championship serie A1 and the 2006 CEV Cup.

In 2009 she won the Mediterranean Games bronze medal with the Croatian national team. With Scavollini Pesaro she won the 2010 Italian super cup and the 2010 Italian national championship serie A1. She then played with the Turkish club Eczacibasi Istanbul, winning the 2011 Turkish national supercup winner and the 2012 Turkish national cup and the 2012 Turkish national championship. She moved to China, and played with Shanghai Volleyball, winning with this team the 2014 Chinese national championship division second place and the 2015 Chinese national championship bronze medal.

== Clubs ==
- (Croatia) AZENA Velika Gorica (1997–2005)
- (Italy) Sirio Perugia (2005–2007)
- (Japan) Pioneer Red Wings (2007–2008)
- (Italy) Pallavolo Cesena (2008–2009)
- (Italy) Scavolini Pesaro (2009–2011)
- (Turkey) Eczacıbaşı Istanbul (2011–2014)
- (China) Shanghai (2014–2015)
- (Italy) Pallavolo Scandicci (feb 2015–May 2015)
- (China) Shanghai (2015–2016)
