= Serbia women's national under-19 volleyball team =

Serbia U19
- Association: Serbian Volleyball Federation
- Confederation: CEV

Uniforms
Home	Away	Third

FIVB U19 World Championship
- Appearances: 6 (First in 2007)
- Best result: (silver) Runners-Up : (2009)

Europe U18 / U17 Championship
- Appearances: 7 (First in 2007)
- Best result: (silver) Runners-Up : (2007 2009 2015)
- Official website (in Serbian)

The Serbia women's national under-19 volleyball team represents Serbia in international women's volleyball competitions and friendly matches under the age 19 and it is ruled by the Serbian Volleyball Federation That is an affiliate of Federation of International Volleyball FIVB and also a part of European Volleyball Confederation CEV.

== Results ==
=== FIVB U19 World Championship ===
Champions Runners up Third place Fourth place

FIVB U19 World Championship
Year	Round	Position	Pld	W	L	SW	SL	Squad
(Brazil) 1989	part of Yugoslavia							
(Portugal) 1991	part of Yugoslavia							
(Czechoslovakia) 1993	part of Serbia and Montenegro							
(France) 1995	part of Serbia and Montenegro							
(Thailand) 1997	part of Serbia and Montenegro							
(Portugal) 1999	part of Serbia and Montenegro							
(Croatia) 2001	part of Serbia and Montenegro							
(Poland) 2003	part of Serbia and Montenegro							
(Macau) 2005	part of Serbia and Montenegro							
(Mexico) 2007		4th place						Squad
(Thailand) 2009		2nd place						Squad
(Turkey) 2011		3rd place						Squad
(Thailand) 2013		6th place						Squad
(Peru) 2015		5th place						Squad
(Argentina) 2017		13th place						Squad
(Egypt) 2019	didn't qualify							
(Mexico) 2021		4th place						Squad
(Croatia) / (Hungary) 2023		17th place						Squad
Total	0 Titles	7/16						

=== Europe U18 / U17 Championship ===
Champions Runners up Third place Fourth place

Europe U18 / U17 Championship
Year	Round	Position	Pld	W	L	SW	SL	Squad
(Spain) 1995	part of Serbia and Montenegro							
(Slovakia) 1997	part of Serbia and Montenegro							
(Poland) 1999	part of Serbia and Montenegro							
(Czech Republic) 2001	part of Serbia and Montenegro							
(Croatia) 2003	part of Serbia and Montenegro							
(Estonia) 2005	part of Serbia and Montenegro							
(Czech Republic) 2007		2nd place						Squad
(Netherlands) 2009		2nd place						Squad
(Turkey) 2011		3rd place						Squad
(Montenegro) / (Serbia) 2013		4th place						Squad
(Bulgaria) 2015		2nd place						Squad
(Netherlands) 2017		4th place						Squad
(Bulgaria) 2018		9th place						Squad
(Montenegro) 2020		3rd place						Squad
(Czech Republic) 2022		4th place						Squad
Total	0 Titles	9/15						

== Team ==
=== Current squad ===
The following is the Serbian roster in the 2015 FIVB Volleyball Girls' U18 World Championship.

Head Coach: Jovo Caković

No.	Name	Date of birth	Height	Weight	Spike	Block	2015 club
2	Katarina Lazović (C)	12 September 1999	1.75 m (5 ft 9 in)	50 kg (110 lb)	280 cm (110 in)	275 cm (108 in)	(Serbia) Vizura Beograd
3	Ana Martinović	7 March 1998	1.80 m (5 ft 11 in)	62 kg (137 lb)	280 cm (110 in)	275 cm (108 in)	(Serbia) Vizura Beograd
4	Ana Jakšić	10 March 1998	1.78 m (5 ft 10 in)	64 kg (141 lb)	285 cm (112 in)	280 cm (110 in)	(Serbia) Crvena Zvezda Beograd
5	Tijana Milojević	10 September 1998	1.71 m (5 ft 7 in)	53 kg (117 lb)	270 cm (110 in)	264 cm (104 in)	(Serbia) Crvena Zvezda Beograd
6	Ljubica Milojević	13 February 1999	1.90 m (6 ft 3 in)	70 kg (150 lb)	300 cm (120 in)	287 cm (113 in)	(Serbia) Kralj Beograd
7	Jovana Kocić	24 February 1998	1.85 m (6 ft 1 in)	64 kg (141 lb)	290 cm (110 in)	285 cm (112 in)	(Serbia) Vizura Beograd
8	Anastasija Sekulić	31 July 1999	1.80 m (5 ft 11 in)	58 kg (128 lb)	280 cm (110 in)	270 cm (110 in)	(Serbia) Crvena Zvezda Beograd
9	Tamara Radmilović	9 June 1999	1.84 m (6 ft 0 in)	64 kg (141 lb)	280 cm (110 in)	275 cm (108 in)	(Serbia) Crvena Zvezda Beograd
10	Anđela Veselinović	5 February 1999	1.73 m (5 ft 8 in)	55 kg (121 lb)	270 cm (110 in)	265 cm (104 in)	(Serbia) Vizura Beograd
11	Milica Tasić	24 December 1999	1.83 m (6 ft 0 in)	62 kg (137 lb)	285 cm (112 in)	280 cm (110 in)	(Serbia) Crvena Zvezda Beograd
14	Anja Ašonja	4 October 1999	1.90 m (6 ft 3 in)	75 kg (165 lb)	290 cm (110 in)	285 cm (112 in)	(Serbia) Crvena Zvezda Beograd
18	Tijana Stojković	3 September 1999	1.84 m (6 ft 0 in)	58 kg (128 lb)	295 cm (116 in)	280 cm (110 in)	(Serbia) Dinamo Pančevo
