= Croatia women's national under-19 volleyball team =

Croatia U19
- Association: Croatian Volleyball Federation
- Confederation: CEV

Uniforms
| Home | Away | Third |

FIVB U19 World Championship
- Appearances: 5 (First in 1999)
- Best result: 5th place (2003, 2023)

Europe U18 / U17 Championship
- Appearances: 5 (First in 1997)
- Best result: (gold) Champions (2003)

The Croatia women's national under-19 volleyball team represents Croatia in international women's volleyball competitions and friendly matches under the age 19 and it is ruled by the Croatian Volleyball Federation That is an affiliate of Federation of International Volleyball FIVB and also a part of European Volleyball Confederation CEV.

== Results ==
=== Summer Youth Olympics ===
Champions Runners up Third place Fourth place

Youth Olympic Games
| Year | Round | Position | Pld | W | L | SW | SL | Squad |
|---|---|---|---|---|---|---|---|---|
| (Singapore) 2010 | Did not qualify | | | | | | | |
| (China) 2014 | No volleyball event | | | | | | | |
| (Argentina) 2018 | No volleyball event | | | | | | | |
| Total | Qualified: 0/1 | | | | | | | |

=== FIVB U19 World Championship ===
Champions Runners up Third place Fourth place

FIVB U19 World Championship
| Year | Round | Position | Pld | W | L | SW | SL | Squad |
|---|---|---|---|---|---|---|---|---|
| (Czechoslovakia) 1993 | Did not qualify | | | | | | | |
| (France) 1995 | Did not qualify | | | | | | | |
| (Thailand) 1997 | Did not qualify | | | | | | | |
| (Portugal) 1999 | Quarterfinals | 8th place | 7 | 3 | 4 | | | Squad |
| (Croatia) 2001 | Play off round | 9th place | 4 | 2 | 2 | 7 | 7 | Squad |
| (Poland) 2003 | Quarterfinals | 5th place | 7 | 5 | 2 | 19 | 6 | Squad |
| (Macau) 2005 | Quarterfinals | 6th place | 7 | 4 | 3 | 14 | 11 | Squad |
| (Mexico) 2007 | Did not qualify | | | | | | | |
| (Thailand) 2009 | Did not qualify | | | | | | | |
| (Turkey) 2011 | Did not qualify | | | | | | | |
| (Thailand) 2013 | Did not qualify | | | | | | | |
| (Peru) 2015 | Did not qualify | | | | | | | |
| (Argentina) 2017 | Did not qualify | | | | | | | |
| (Egypt) 2019 | Did not qualify | | | | | | | |
| (Mexico) 2021 | Did not qualify | | | | | | | |
| (Croatia) (Hungary) 2023 | Quarterfinals | 5th place | 9 | 7 | 2 | 23 | 12 | Squad |
| Total | Qualified: 5/16 | | 34 | 21 | 13 | 63 | 36 | — |

=== Europe U18 / U17 Championship ===
Champions Runners up Third place Fourth place

Youth European Championship record
| Year | Round | Position | Pld | W | L | SW | SL | Squad |
|---|---|---|---|---|---|---|---|---|
| (Spain) 1995 | Did not qualify | | | | | | | |
| (Slovakia) 1997 | Final | Runners-up | 5 | 3 | 2 | 12 | 9 | Squad |
| (Poland) 1999 | Did not qualify | | | | | | | |
| (Czech Republic) 2001 | Did not qualify | | | | | | | |
| (Croatia) 2003 | Final | Champions | 5 | 5 | 0 | 15 | 1 | Squad |
| (Estonia) 2005 | Semifinals | 4th place | 5 | 3 | 2 | 12 | 6 | Squad |
| (Czech Republic) 2007 | Did not qualify | | | | | | | |
| (Netherlands) 2009 | Did not qualify | | | | | | | |
| (Turkey) 2011 | Did not qualify | | | | | | | |
| (Montenegro) (Serbia) 2013 | Did not qualify | | | | | | | |
| (Bulgaria) 2015 | Did not qualify | | | | | | | |
| (Netherlands) 2017 | Did not qualify | | | | | | | |
| (Bulgaria) 2018 | Did not qualify | | | | | | | |
| (Montenegro) 2020 | Did not qualify | | | | | | | |
| (Czech Republic) 2022 | Group stage | 9th place | 5 | 2 | 3 | 7 | 12 | Squad |
| (Greece) (Romania) 2024 | Group stage | 10th place | 7 | 3 | 4 | 15 | 16 | Squad |
| Total | Qualified: 5/16 | | 27 | 16 | 11 | 61 | 44 | — |
