= Belgium women's national under-19 volleyball team =

Belgium U19
- Association: Koninklijk Belgisch Volleybalverbond (KBVBV)
- Confederation: CEV

Uniforms
| Home | Away | Third |

Youth Olympic Games
- Appearances: 1 (First in 2010)
- Best result: (gold) Gold medalist : (2010)

FIVB U19 World Championship
- Appearances: 3 (First in 2007)
- Best result: (bronze) Third place : (2009)

Europe U18 / U17 Championship
- Appearances: 5 (First in 1999)
- Best result: (gold) Champions : (2009)
- Top Volley Belgium

The Belgium women's national under-19 volleyball team represents Belgium in international women's volleyball competitions and friendly matches under the age 19 and it is ruled and managed by the Belgium Royal Volleyball Federation That is an affiliate of Federation of International Volleyball FIVB and also a part of European Volleyball Confederation CEV.

== Results ==
=== Summer Youth Olympics ===
Champions Runners up Third place Fourth place

Youth Olympic Games
| Year | Round | Position | Pld | W | L | SW | SL | Squad |
|---|---|---|---|---|---|---|---|---|
| (Singapore) 2010 | | 1st place | | | | | | |
| (China) 2014 | No Volleyball Event | | | | | | | |
| (Argentina) 2018 | No Volleyball Event | | | | | | | |
| Total | 1 Title | 1/1 | | | | | | |

=== FIVB U19 World Championship ===
Champions Runners up Third place Fourth place

FIVB U19 World Championship
| Year | Round | Position | Pld | W | L | SW | SL | Squad |
|---|---|---|---|---|---|---|---|---|
| (Brazil) 1989 | Didn't Qualify | | | | | | | |
| (Portugal) 1991 | Didn't Qualify | | | | | | | |
| (Czechoslovakia) 1993 | Didn't Qualify | | | | | | | |
| (France) 1995 | Didn't Qualify | | | | | | | |
| (Thailand) 1997 | Didn't Qualify | | | | | | | |
| (Portugal) 1999 | Didn't Qualify | | | | | | | |
| (Croatia) 2001 | Didn't Qualify | | | | | | | |
| (Poland) 2003 | Didn't Qualify | | | | | | | |
| (Macau) 2005 | Didn't Qualify | | | | | | | |
| (Mexico) 2007 | | 6th place | | | | | | Squad |
| (Thailand) 2009 | | Third place | | | | | | Squad |
| (Turkey) 2011 | Didn't Qualify | | | | | | | |
| (Thailand) 2013 | Didn't Qualify | | | | | | | |
| (Peru) 2015 | | 12th place | | | | | | Squad |
| (Argentina) 2017 | Didn't Qualify | | | | | | | |
| Total | 0 Titles | 3/15 | | | | | | |

=== Europe U18 / U17 Championship ===
Champions Runners up Third place Fourth place

Europe U18 / U17 Championship
| Year | Round | Position | Pld | W | L | SW | SL | Squad |
|---|---|---|---|---|---|---|---|---|
| (Spain) 1995 | Didn't Qualify | | | | | | | |
| (Slovakia) 1997 | Didn't Qualify | | | | | | | |
| (Poland) 1999 | | 5th place | | | | | | Squad |
| (Czech Republic) 2001 | Didn't Qualify | | | | | | | |
| (Croatia) 2003 | Didn't Qualify | | | | | | | |
| (Estonia) 2005 | Didn't Qualify | | | | | | | |
| (Czech Republic) 2007 | | 4th place | | | | | | Squad |
| (Netherlands) 2009 | | 1st place | | | | | | Squad |
| (Turkey) 2011 | | 10th place | | | | | | Squad |
| (Montenegro) / (Serbia) 2013 | Didn't Qualify | | | | | | | |
| (Bulgaria) 2015 | | Third place | | | | | | Squad |
| (Netherlands) 2017 | Didn't Qualify | | | | | | | |
| (Bulgaria) 2018 | Didn't Qualify | | | | | | | |
| Total | 1 Title | 5/13 | | | | | | |

== Team ==
=== Current squad ===
The following is the Belgian roster in the 2015 FIVB Volleyball Girls' U18 World Championship.

Head Coach: Fien Callens

| No. | Name | Date of birth | Height | Weight | Spike | Block | 2015 club |
|---|---|---|---|---|---|---|---|
| 1 | Amber De Tant | 22 March 1998 | 1.77 m (5 ft 10 in) | 66 kg (146 lb) | 303 cm (119 in) | 280 cm (110 in) | (Belgium) Asterix Kieldrecht |
| 2 | Silke Van Avermaet | 2 June 1999 | 1.93 m (6 ft 4 in) | 71 kg (157 lb) | 311 cm (122 in) | 290 cm (110 in) | (Belgium) Asterix Kieldrecht |
| 3 | Charlotte Coppin (C) | 1 December 1998 | 1.85 m (6 ft 1 in) | 65 kg (143 lb) | 300 cm (120 in) | 283 cm (111 in) | (Belgium) TSV Vilvoorde |
| 4 | Britt Herbots | 29 April 1999 | 1.81 m (5 ft 11 in) | 60 kg (130 lb) | 308 cm (121 in) | 283 cm (111 in) | (Belgium) Asterix Kieldrecht |
| 6 | Laure Flament | 18 June 1998 | 1.81 m (5 ft 11 in) | 75 kg (165 lb) | 298 cm (117 in) | 273 cm (107 in) | (Belgium) VDK Gent Dames |
| 8 | Bieke Kindt | 11 February 2000 | 1.88 m (6 ft 2 in) | 70 kg (150 lb) | 306 cm (120 in) | 285 cm (112 in) | (Belgium) TSV Vilvoorde |
| 9 | Lisa Van Den Vonder | 7 September 1998 | 1.82 m (6 ft 0 in) | 65 kg (143 lb) | 293 cm (115 in) | 278 cm (109 in) | (Belgium) Asterix Kieldrecht |
| 11 | Manon Stragier | 12 March 1999 | 1.83 m (6 ft 0 in) | 68 kg (150 lb) | 305 cm (120 in) | 283 cm (111 in) | (Belgium) Asterix Kieldrecht |
| 12 | Hanne Coppens | 7 May 1998 | 1.84 m (6 ft 0 in) | 70 kg (150 lb) | 303 cm (119 in) | 288 cm (113 in) | (Belgium) TSV Vilvoorde |
| 14 | Anna Valkenborg | 4 January 1998 | 1.74 m (5 ft 9 in) | 58 kg (128 lb) | 290 cm (110 in) | 270 cm (110 in) | (Belgium) TSV Vilvoorde |
| 16 | Lotte De Quick | 11 January 1998 | 1.72 m (5 ft 8 in) | 53 kg (117 lb) | 283 cm (111 in) | 260 cm (100 in) | (Belgium) TSV Vilvoorde |
| 17 | Justine D'hondt | 8 July 1999 | 1.77 m (5 ft 10 in) | 60 kg (130 lb) | 298 cm (117 in) | 267 cm (105 in) | (Belgium) TSV Vilvoorde |

== Notable players ==
- Ilka Van de Vyver
- Laura Heyrman
- Lise Van Hecke
