= Spain women's national under-19 volleyball team =

Spain U19
- Association: Real Federación Española de Voleibol
- Confederation: CEV

Uniforms
Home	Away	Third

FIVB U19 World Championship
- Appearances: 1 (First in 2001)
- Best result: 9th Place : (2001)

Europe U18 / U17 Championship
- Appearances: 3 (First in 1995)
- Best result: 6th place : (2001)
- Website

The Spain women's national under-19 volleyball team represents Spain in under-19 international women's volleyball competitions and friendly matches, It is ruled and managed by Spanish Royal Volleyball Federation That is an affiliate of Federation of International Volleyball FIVB and also a part of European Volleyball Confederation CEV.

== Results ==
=== FIVB U19 World Championship ===
Champions Runners up Third place Fourth place

FIVB U19 World Championship
Year	Round	Position	Pld	W	L	SW	SL	Squad
(Brazil) 1989	Didn't Qualify							
(Portugal) 1991	Didn't Qualify							
(Czechoslovakia) 1993	Didn't Qualify							
(France) 1995	Didn't Qualify							
(Thailand) 1997	Didn't Qualify							
(Portugal) 1999	Didn't Qualify							
(Croatia) 2001		9th place						Squad
(Poland) 2003	Didn't Qualify							
(Macau) 2005	Didn't Qualify							
(Mexico) 2007	Didn't Qualify							
(Thailand) 2009	Didn't Qualify							
(Turkey) 2011	Didn't Qualify							
(Thailand) 2013	Didn't Qualify							
(Peru) 2015	Didn't Qualify							
(Argentina) 2017	Didn't Qualify							
Total	0 Titles	1/15						—

=== Europe U18 / U17 Championship ===
Champions Runners up Third place Fourth place

Europe U18 / U17 Championship
Year	Round	Position	Pld	W	L	SW	SL	Squad
(Spain) 1995		8th place						Squad
(Slovakia) 1997	Didn't Qualify							
(Poland) 1999	Didn't Qualify							
(Czech Republic) 2001		6th place						Squad
(Croatia) 2003	Didn't Qualify							
(Estonia) 2005	Didn't Qualify							
(Czech Republic) 2007	Didn't Qualify							
(Netherlands) 2009	Didn't Qualify							
(Turkey) 2011		7th place						Squad
(Montenegro) / (Serbia) 2013	Didn't Qualify							
(Bulgaria) 2015	Didn't Qualify							
(Netherlands) 2017	Didn't Qualify							
(Bulgaria) 2018	Didn't Qualify							
Total	0 Titles	3/13						

== Team ==
=== Past squad ===
The following is the Spanish roster in the 2017 European U18 Championship.

Head coach: (Spain) Pascual Saurib

#	Name	Year of birth	Height	Weight	Spike	Block
1	Berta Alocen	2001	1.80 m (5 ft 11 in)	65 kg (143 lb)	000 cm (0 in)	000 cm (0 in)
2	Jimena Fernandez	2001	1.81 m (5 ft 11 in)	64 kg (141 lb)	000 cm (0 in)	000 cm (0 in)
3	Raquel Montoro	2002	1.79 m (5 ft 10 in)	59 kg (130 lb)	000 cm (0 in)	000 cm (0 in)
4	Sheyla Gomez	2000	1.69 m (5 ft 7 in)	62 kg (137 lb)	000 cm (0 in)	000 cm (0 in)
5	Loreto Muñez	2000	1.82 m (6 ft 0 in)	70 kg (150 lb)	000 cm (0 in)	000 cm (0 in)
6	Maria Rodrigez	2000	1.77 m (5 ft 10 in)	59 kg (130 lb)	000 cm (0 in)	000 cm (0 in)
7	Adriana Alonso	2000	1.75 m (5 ft 9 in)	55 kg (121 lb)	000 cm (0 in)	000 cm (0 in)
8	Caliope Garcia	2001	1.84 m (6 ft 0 in)	71 kg (157 lb)	000 cm (0 in)	000 cm (0 in)
9	Raquel Lazaro	2000	1.81 m (5 ft 11 in)	64 kg (141 lb)	000 cm (0 in)	000 cm (0 in)
10	Lucrecia Castellano	2000	1.80 m (5 ft 11 in)	70 kg (150 lb)	000 cm (0 in)	000 cm (0 in)
11	Victoria Margalida Piza	2000	1.64 m (5 ft 5 in)	60 kg (130 lb)	000 cm (0 in)	000 cm (0 in)
13	Sol Guidarelli	2001	1.80 m (5 ft 11 in)	64 kg (141 lb)	000 cm (0 in)	000 cm (0 in)
14	Antia Vallecas	2001	1.79 m (5 ft 10 in)	70 kg (150 lb)	000 cm (0 in)	000 cm (0 in)
15	Aina Pons	1998	1.75 m (5 ft 9 in)	70 kg (150 lb)	000 cm (0 in)	000 cm (0 in)
16	Sol Guadalupe Rosell	2000	1.84 m (6 ft 0 in)	67 kg (148 lb)	000 cm (0 in)	000 cm (0 in)
17	Lorena Martin	2000	1.79 m (5 ft 10 in)	72 kg (159 lb)	000 cm (0 in)	000 cm (0 in)
18	Teresa Mas	2001	1.76 m (5 ft 9 in)	62 kg (137 lb)	000 cm (0 in)	000 cm (0 in)
19	Ana Pardo	2001	1.68 m (5 ft 6 in)	56 kg (123 lb)	000 cm (0 in)	000 cm (0 in)
20	Maria Rodríguez	2001	1.66 m (5 ft 5 in)	54 kg (119 lb)	000 cm (0 in)	000 cm (0 in)
21	Elena Santana	2000	1.88 m (6 ft 2 in)	75 kg (165 lb)	000 cm (0 in)	000 cm (0 in)
22	Claudia Terrón	2001	1.87 m (6 ft 2 in)	80 kg (180 lb)	000 cm (0 in)	000 cm (0 in)
23	Sara Urrea	2001	1.82 m (6 ft 0 in)	70 kg (150 lb)	000 cm (0 in)	000 cm (0 in)
