= 2001 FIVB Volleyball Girls' U18 World Championship =

2001 FIVB Girls Youth World Championship
Tournament details
- Host country: Croatia
- Dates: 22–30 September 2001
- Teams: 15
- Venues: 2 (in 2 host cities)

Final positions
- Champions: China (1st title)

The 2001 FIVB Girls Youth Volleyball World Championship was held in Pula and Rijeka, Croatia from 22 to 30 September 2001.

== Qualification process ==
Means of qualification	Date	Venue	Vacancies	Qualifier
Host country			1	Croatia
2001 European Championship	16–21 April 2001	(Czech Republic)	6	Italy Poland Belarus Russia Spain Czech Republic
2001 Asian Championship	16–23 April 2001	(Thailand) Trang	4	China Japan South Korea Chinese Taipei
2000 South American Youth Championship			2	Brazil Argentina
2000 NORCECA Youth Championship			2	Dominican Republic Puerto Rico
2000 African Championship			1	Kenya
Total				16

== First round ==
=== Pool A ===
Pos	Team	Pld	W	L	Pts	SW	SL	SR	SPW	SPL	SPR	Qualification
1	Chinese Taipei	3	3	0	6	9	0	MAX	230	171	1.345	Seeding playoff
2	Croatia	3	2	1	5	6	4	1.500	227	194	1.170	Elimination playoff
3	Spain	3	1	2	4	4	6	0.667	208	216	0.963	Elimination playoff
4	Kenya	3	0	3	3	0	9	0.000	146	230	0.635	

Date	Time		Score		Set 1	Set 2	Set 3	Set 4	Set 5	Total	Report
22 Sep	15:00	Chinese Taipei	3–0	Spain	25–19	25–13	25–21			75–53	Report
22 Sep	18:00	Kenya	0–3	Croatia	15–22	16–25	8–25			39–72	Report
23 Sep	15:35	Kenya	0–3	Chinese Taipei	15–25	17–25	28–30			60–80	Report
23 Sep	18:00	Croatia	3–1	Spain	25–12	25–21	19–25	25–22		94–80	Report
24 Sep	16:25	Spain	3–0	Kenya	25–13	25–19	25–15			75–47	Report
24 Sep	18:05	Croatia	0–3	Chinese Taipei	22–25	16–25	20–25			58–75	Report

=== Pool B ===
Pos	Team	Pld	W	L	Pts	SW	SL	SR	SPW	SPL	SPR	Qualification
1	Russia	3	3	0	6	9	3	3.000	270	237	1.139	Seeding playoff
2	Japan	3	1	2	4	7	7	1.000	300	296	1.014	Elimination playoff
3	Dominican Republic	3	1	2	4	6	8	0.750	276	298	0.926	Elimination playoff
4	Belarus	3	1	2	4	4	8	0.500	256	271	0.945	

Date	Time		Score		Set 1	Set 2	Set 3	Set 4	Set 5	Total	Report
22 Sep	15:00	Japan	3–1	Belarus	25–18	25–22	20–25	25–18		95–83	Report
22 Sep	20:45	Dominican Republic	1–3	Russia	25–16	7–25	15–25	19–25		66–91	Report
23 Sep	15:00	Japan	2–3	Dominican Republic	25–23	25–21	22–25	16–25	12–15	100–109	Report
23 Sep	18:00	Belarus	0–3	Russia	20–25	23–25	23–25			66–75	Report
24 Sep	13:00	Russia	3–2	Japan	25–22	15–25	24–26	25–22	15–10	104–105	Report
24 Sep	18:00	Dominican Republic	2–3	Belarus	15–25	23–25	28–26	25–16	10–15	101–107	Report

=== Pool C ===
Pos	Team	Pld	W	L	Pts	SW	SL	SR	SPW	SPL	SPR	Qualification
1	Brazil	3	3	0	6	9	4	2.250	284	262	1.084	Seeding playoff
2	Poland	3	2	1	5	8	3	2.667	251	223	1.126	Elimination playoff
3	Italy	3	1	2	4	5	7	0.714	255	270	0.944	Elimination playoff
4	Czech Republic	3	0	3	3	1	9	0.111	218	253	0.862	

Date	Time		Score		Set 1	Set 2	Set 3	Set 4	Set 5	Total	Report
22 Sep	13:00	Poland	3–0	Czech Republic	27–25	25–23	25–19			77–67	Report
22 Sep	18:00	Italy	2–3	Brazil	23–25	25–19	19–25	25–21	10–15	102–105	Report
23 Sep	13:00	Poland	3–0	Italy	25–21	25–15	25–17			75–53	Report
23 Sep	20:00	Czech Republic	0–3	Brazil	24–26	20–25	17–25			61–76	Report
24 Sep	15:00	Italy	3–1	Czech Republic	25–27	25–22	25–18	25–13		100–80	Report
24 Sep	20:00	Brazil	3–2	Poland	25–20	25–16	23–25	15–25	15–13	103–99	Report

=== Pool D ===
Pos	Team	Pld	W	L	Pts	SW	SL	SR	SPW	SPL	SPR	Qualification
1	China	2	2	0	4	6	2	3.000	179	162	1.105	Seeding playoff
2	Argentina	2	1	1	3	3	3	1.000	140	136	1.029	Elimination playoff
3	South Korea	2	0	2	2	2	6	0.333	158	179	0.883	Elimination playoff

Date	Time		Score		Set 1	Set 2	Set 3	Set 4	Set 5	Total	Report
22 Sep	20:00	South Korea	0–3	Argentina	17–25	23–25	21–25			61–75	Report
23 Sep	20:25	China	3–0	Argentina	25–22	25–23	25–20			75–65	Report
24 Sep	14:00	South Korea	2–3	China	18–25	25–22	25–17	16–25	13–15	97–104	Report

== Second round ==
=== Play off – elimination group ===
Date	Time		Score		Set 1	Set 2	Set 3	Set 4	Set 5	Total	Report
26 Sep	09:00	Poland	3–1	Spain	23–25	25–22	25–14	25–18		98–79	Report
26 Sep	11:00	Argentina	0–3	Italy	18–25	18–25	23–25			59–75	Report
26 Sep	14:15	Japan	3–1	South Korea	22–25	25–15	25–21	25–17		97–78	Report
26 Sep	19:00	Croatia	1–3	Dominican Republic	21–25	25–20	23–25	19–25		88–95	Report

=== Play off – seeding group ===
Date	Time		Score		Set 1	Set 2	Set 3	Set 4	Set 5	Total	Report
26 Sep	16:30	Brazil	0–3	China	21–25	13–25	22–25			56–75	Report
26 Sep	21:20	Chinese Taipei	0–3	Russia	15–25	17–25	22–25			54–75	Report

== Final round ==
Quarterfinals
28 September – Pula
Russia	0
Poland	3
27 September – Pula
Brazil	3
Dominican Republic	1
27 September – Pula
Chinese Taipei	1
Italy	3
27 September – Pula
China	3
Japan	0

Semifinals
29 September – Pula
Poland	1
Brazil	3
29 September – Pula
Italy	1
China	3

Final
30 September – Pula
Brazil	1
China	3
3rd place
30 September – Pula
Italy	2
Poland	3

5th–8th places
29 September – Pula
Russia	3
Dominican Republic	1
29 September – Pula
Chinese Taipei	0
Japan	3

5th place
30 September – Pula
Russia	0
Japan	3
7th place
30 September – Pula
Dominican Republic	1
Chinese Taipei	3

=== Quarterfinals ===
Date	Time		Score		Set 1	Set 2	Set 3	Set 4	Set 5	Total	Report
27 Sep	15:00	Brazil	3–1	Dominican Republic	22–25	25–13	25–22	25–18		97–78	Report
27 Sep	18:00	Chinese Taipei	1–3	Italy	17–25	22–25	25–22	22–25		86–97	Report
27 Sep	20:20	China	3–0	Japan	25–23	25–17	25–23			75–63	Report
28 Sep	13:00	Russia	0–3	Poland	25–27	21–25	18–25			64–77	Report

=== 5th–8th semifinals ===
Date	Time		Score		Set 1	Set 2	Set 3	Set 4	Set 5	Total	Report
29 Sep	13:00	Russia	3–1	Dominican Republic	30–28	23–25	25–18	25–19		103–90	Report
29 Sep	15:13	Chinese Taipei	0–3	Japan	22–25	19–25	20–25			61–75	Report

=== Semifinals ===
Date	Time		Score		Set 1	Set 2	Set 3	Set 4	Set 5	Total	Report
29 Sep	18:00	Poland	1–3	Brazil	25–22	22–25	17–25	22–25		86–97	Report
29 Sep	20:00	Italy	1–3	China	22–25	25–18	16–25	15–25		78–93	Report

=== 7th place ===
Date	Time		Score		Set 1	Set 2	Set 3	Set 4	Set 5	Total	Report
30 Sep	13:00	Dominican Republic	1–3	Chinese Taipei	19–25	29–31	25–14	19–25		92–95	Report

=== 5th place ===
Date	Time		Score		Set 1	Set 2	Set 3	Set 4	Set 5	Total	Report
30 Sep	15:15	Russia	0–3	Japan	17–25	19–25	20–25			56–75	Report

=== 3rd place ===
Date	Time		Score		Set 1	Set 2	Set 3	Set 4	Set 5	Total	Report
30 Sep	17:00	Italy	2–3	Poland	12–25	25–22	22–25	25–23	10–15	94–110	Report

=== Final ===
Date	Time		Score		Set 1	Set 2	Set 3	Set 4	Set 5	Total	Report
30 Sep	19:30	Brazil	1–3	China	23–25	21–25	27–25	22–25		93–100	Report

== Final standing ==
Rank	Team
1st place, gold medalist(s)	China
2nd place, silver medalist(s)	Brazil
3rd place, bronze medalist(s)	Poland
4	Italy
5	Japan
6	Russia
7	Chinese Taipei
8	Dominican Republic
9	Argentina
9	Croatia
9	South Korea
9	Spain
13	Belarus
13	Czech Republic
13	Kenya

== Individual awards ==
- Best scorer
  - Huang Huiping (CHN)
- Best attacker
  - Fabiana Claudino (BRA)
- Best blocker
  - Fabiana Claudino (BRA)
- Best server
  - Ayako Sana (JPN)
- Best digger
  - Sara Paris (ITA)
- Best setter
  - Zhang Xian (CHN)
- Best receiver
  - Raquele Lenartowicz (BRA)
